= 1924 French Grand Prix =

Race details
- Date: 3 August 1924
- Official name: XVIII Grand Prix de l'Automobile Club de France
- Location: Lyon, France
- Course: Public roads
- Course length: 23.15 km (14.38 miles)
- Distance: 35 laps, 810.09 km (503.37 miles)

Pole position
Driver	(United Kingdom) Henry Segrave	Sunbeam
- Grid positions set by ballot

Fastest lap
Driver	(United Kingdom) Henry Segrave	Sunbeam
- Time: 11:19.0

Podium
First	(Italy) Giuseppe Campari	Alfa Romeo
Second	(France) Albert Divo	Delage
Third	(France) Robert Benoist	Delage

The 1924 French Grand Prix, officially named the XVIII Grand Prix de l'A.C.F., was a Grand Prix motor race held at Lyon on 3 August 1924 and the designated European Grand Prix of the 1924 season. The race took place over 35 laps of a shortened (now 23.15 km) version of the circuit used in 1914 for a total distance of 810.09 km.

== Entries ==
The 1924 race attracted one of the largest entries of all the French Grands Prix of the 1920s with 22 entries. Sunbeam entered three cars to defend their 1923 win, these being improved versions of the 1923 cars now with superchargers as well as modified bodywork and new four-speed gearboxes. They were to be driven by an all British team consisting of 1923 winner Henry Segrave, Kenelm Lee Guinness and newcomer to the team Dario Resta. Fiat also returned with similar cars to 1923, however with revised superchargers, the team with four cars being led by Felice Nazzaro.

Alfa Romeo made their French Grand Prix debut with their new Alfa Romeo P2s, with four entries to be driven by Antonio Ascari, Giuseppe Campari and Louis Wagner, while Enzo Ferrari did not start as he fell ill. The Alfa Romeos, like the Sunbeams and Fiats, were fitted with Roots-type superchargers.

Three Delages were entered, development from the 1923 cars having continued. Although they were tested with superchargers these were not used due to reliability concerns. Bugatti entered six cars in what was the debut of the highly successful Bugatti T35, however they were uncompetitive in 1924 due to their underpowered, naturally aspirated engines. Two cars based on the 1923 Rolland-Pilains were entered, now rebuilt as Schmids. Giulio Foresti crashed in practice leaving Jules Goux as the only starter for the team. Finally an American Miller was entered by Louis Zborowski, the first private entry ever to be accepted for the French Grand Prix.

== Race ==
At the rolling start Segrave took the lead from the front row which he shared with Albert Divo's Delage, while Ascari immediately came through from the second row into second place. At the end of the first lap Segrave had a small lead over Ascari, Guinness, Campari and Pietro Bordino (in a Fiat). They were then followed by Divo, Resta, Giuseppe Pastore (Fiat), Robert Benoist (Delage) and René Thomas (Delage).

On the second lap, Bordino was able to overtake Campari, Guinness and Ascari to move into second place, and near the end of his third lap was able to take first place with Segrave making a pitstop for new plugs dropping him from second to 17th place. For the next few laps Ascari was able to keep up with Bordino, while Guinness had to defend his third place from Campari. Wagner had moved up to fifth place with the rest of the field struggling behind. On lap nine Bordino overshot a corner due to fading brakes, giving the lead to Ascari. Although Bordino retook the lead on the next lap he was forced to pit a few laps later to repair his brakes, putting him out of the race, eventually retiring after 17 laps.

Ascari made a scheduled pitstop for fuel and tyres on lap 16, allowing Guinness into a small lead over Campari. On the next lap, however, Guinness blew a tyre forcing a wheel change dropping him to second. Segrave, who was a lap down, had to stop for a new riding mechanic as his had been hit by the tread of Guinness' blown tyre. The order after 17 laps was Campari with nearly a minute over Guinness and Divo, Ascari another two minutes behind in fourth, followed by Benoist, Wagner and Segrave in seventh and just over a lap behind Campari, the rest of the field now some way behind. Ascari quickly moved back up through the field and into first place on lap 20. On the following lap Guinness retired with engine failure giving Alfa Romeo first, second and fifth places, with the Delages in third, fourth and sixth. Over the next few laps the two leading Alfa Romeos stayed close together with Campari taking the lead during lap 27 only for Ascari to retake before the lap was over. Divo in the best placed Delage, was pushing, making up some time but not enough to worry the Italians. Segrave was the fastest driver on the track, moving up to sixth place and on the 29th lap setting the fastest lap of the race, 11 minutes 19 seconds.

On the 32nd lap Ascari began to slow, being passed first by Campari, then a lap later by Divo. Finally with just one lap to go Ascari pulled into the pits. Ascari and his mechanic tried desperately to make the engine restart but the damage was terminal. Mechanic Ramponi attempted to push the car over the line but collapsed, so the Alfa Romeo was a non-finisher. Campari won the race by just over a minute from Divo with Benoist another ten minutes behind in third.

== Classification ==
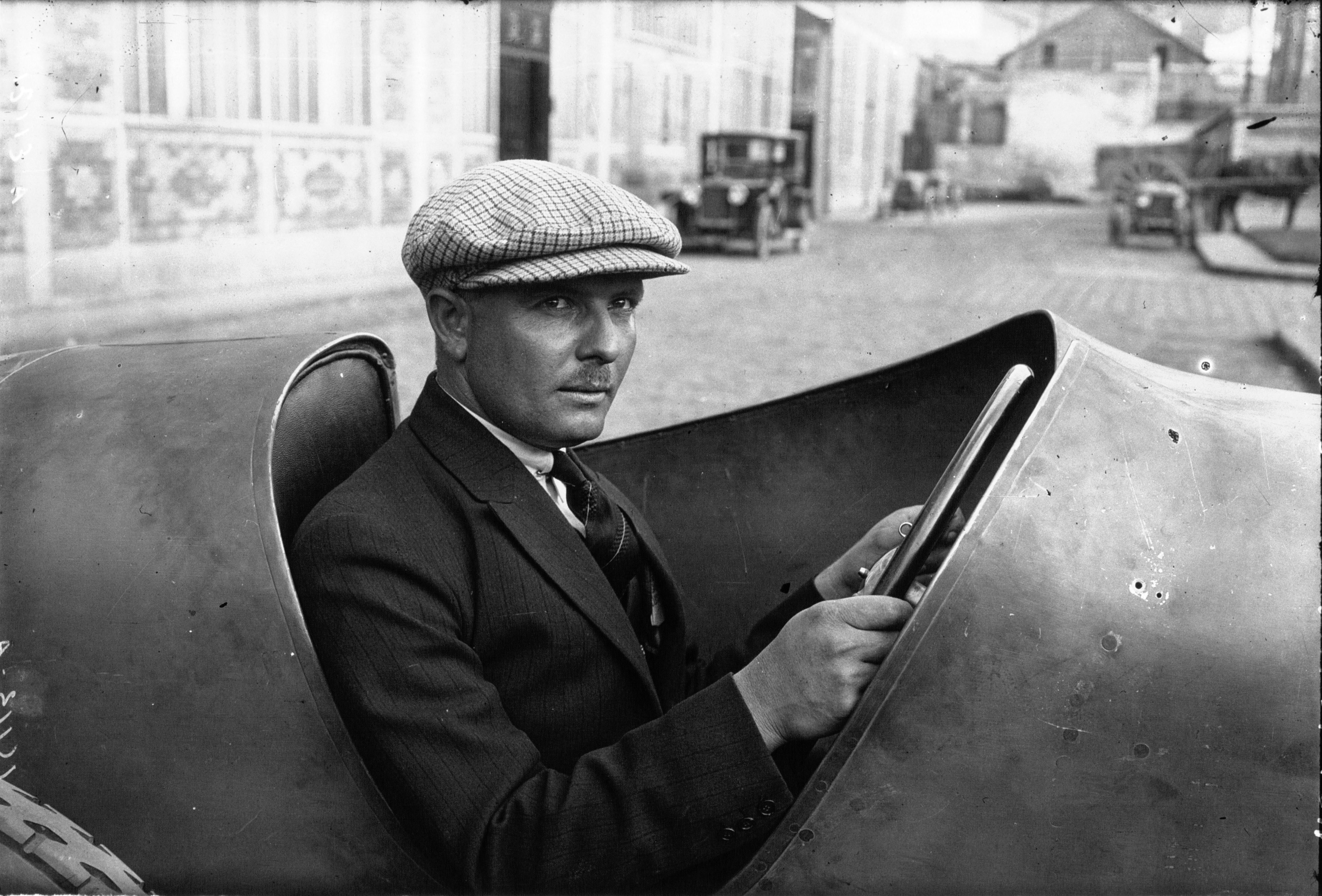
Albert Divo, Automobiles Delage

Pos	No	Driver	Car	Laps	Time/Retired
1	10	(Italy) Giuseppe Campari	Alfa Romeo P2 8C/2000	35	7h05m34.8
2	2	(France) Albert Divo	Delage 2LCV	35	7h06m40.2
3	9	(France) Robert Benoist	Delage 2LCV	35	7h17m00.8
4	16	(France) Louis Wagner	Alfa Romeo P2 8C/2000	35	7h25m10.8
5	1	(United Kingdom) Henry Segrave	Sunbeam	35	7h28m56.0
6	15	(France) René Thomas	Delage 2LCV	35	7h37m27.4
7	7	(France) Jean Chassagne	Bugatti T35	35	7h46m26.6
8	13	(France) Ernest Friderich	Bugatti T35	35	7h51m45.6
9	3	(Italy) Antonio Ascari	Alfa Romeo P2 8C/2000	34	Engine
10	14	(United Kingdom) Dario Resta	Sunbeam	33	Flagged off
11	21	(France) Leonico Garnier	Bugatti T35	33	Flagged off
Ret	5	(Italy) Felice Nazzaro	Fiat 805	22	Brakes
Ret	8	(United Kingdom) Kenelm Lee Guinness	Sunbeam	20	Engine
Ret	11	(France) Jules Goux	Rolland-Pilain-Schmid	19	Radiator
Ret	17	(Italy) Onesimo Marchisio	Fiat 805	17	Engine
Ret	12	(Italy) Pietro Bordino	Fiat 805	17	Brakes
Ret	6	(United Kingdom) Louis Zborowski	Miller 122	16	Front axle
Ret	22	(Italy) Meo Costantini	Bugatti T35	16	Steering
Ret	18	(Spain) Pierre de Vizcaya	Bugatti T35	11	Crash
Ret	20	(Italy) Giuseppe Pastore	Fiat 805	11	Crash
DNS	4	(Italy) Giulio Foresti	Rolland-Pilain-Schmid		Crash
DNS	19	(Italy) Enzo Ferrari	Alfa Romeo P2 8C/2000		Driver ill

Grand Prix Race
Previous race: 1924 Indianapolis 500	1924 Grand Prix season Grandes Épreuves	Next race: 1924 Italian Grand Prix
Previous race: 1923 French Grand Prix	French Grand Prix	Next race: 1925 French Grand Prix
Previous race: 1923 Italian Grand Prix	European Grand Prix (Designated European Grand Prix)	Next race: 1925 Belgian Grand Prix
