= 1924 Grand Prix season =

Grand Prix season

Seasons
- ← 1923 1925 →

The 1924 Grand Prix season saw Grand Prix motor racing spread further across Europe and North America. In Italy a number of new open-road events were held. In France two new circuits were opened – at Montlhéry near Paris and Miramas near Marseille.

After Fiat's dominance the previous year with its supercharged Type 805, most teams adopted supercharging with their new cars. Significantly the French teams of Bugatti, Delage and Rolland Pilain chose not to.

The first major event of the year, at the Targa Florio on Sicily, saw a big German contingent, led by Mercedes, arrive to take on the Italian teams. From the staggered start it became a duel between Christian Werner and Antonio Ascari's Alfa Romeo. But in a repeat of the previous year, his car stopped within sight of the finish line. Pushed by the spectators he was disqualified, giving victory to the Mercedes.

The entry list for this year's Indianapolis 500 was dominated by Millers. They were up against Fred Duesenberg's team with his new supercharged straight-8. Joe Boyer's Duesenberg initially took the lead until supercharger issues forced him to pit. The Millers of Jimmy Murphy and Earl Cooper then traded the lead for most of the race. Boyer meanwhile had swapped cars with his teammate L. L. Corum and gradually reeled in the leaders, taking the lead with 24 laps to go. Boyer and Corum won at a record pace and gave Duesenberg their first Indianapolis victory, also being the first drivers given a shared victory in the race.

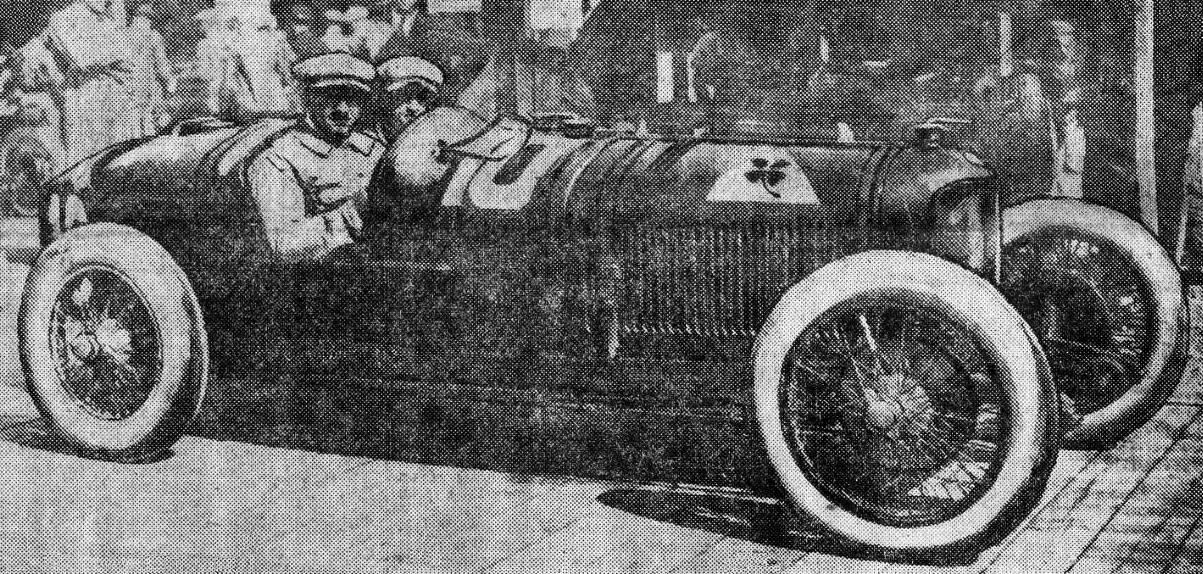
Giuseppe Campari, winner of the French Grand Prix

The French Grand Prix, this year's European Grand Prix, maintained its pre-eminence with a strong international field. The race was held again in Lyon, which had held the epic 1914 race. Most works teams arrived with new cars including Bugatti with its iconic Type 35 and Alfa Romeo with the P2. After Pietro Bordino initially led, Antonio Ascari took over and dominated the race. The challenges from Sunbeam and Fiat wilted over time. Then with just three laps to go, Ascari slowed and had to pit but was unable to restart. His veteran teammate Giuseppe Campari came through and won, barely a minute ahead of Albert Divo's Delage.

Having been beaten at their own Grand Prix yet again, the French had high hopes of victory at the San Sebastián Grand Prix. Fiat and Alfa Romeo stayed away to prepare for their national GP. But it was Henry Segrave in the Sunbeam who narrowly won from Meo Costantini's Bugatti and André Morel in a Delage.

The dominance of Alfa Romeo dissuaded Bugatti and Delage from the Italian Grand Prix. Injuries to their drivers then caused Fiat to pull out and Mercedes were not ready yet so the organisers postponed the race for six weeks. Only four teams arrived for the race in October which would be a contest between Alfa Romeo and the new Mercedes. But when Louis Zborowski crashed his Mercedes and was killed, the rest of the team was withdrawn. Ascari won, leading a 1-2-3-4 result for Alfa Romeo.

With the increased Interest in the 2-litre formula, voiturette racing fell back into the background predominantly for local and lead-in races. This year the results were shared between the Talbot 70, the Salmson VAL and new arrival Amilcar.

== Major races ==
Date	Name	Circuit	Race Regulations	Race Distance	Winner's Time	Winning driver	Winning constructor	Report
13 Apr	(Italy) I Circuito del Tigullio	Tigullio	Formula Libre	225 km	4h 16m	(Italy) Tazio Nuvolari	Bianchi 20	Report
20 Apr	(Italy) I Circuito di Alessandria	Alessandria	Voiturette	255 km	3h 18m	(Italy) Domenico Masino	Fiat 501 S	Report
27 Apr	(Italy) XV Targa Florio (Note: The Targa Florio and the Coppa Florio were run simultaneously over the same route. The Targa Florio comprised four laps of the 108 km route for a total of 432 km, and the Coppa Florio added a fifth lap, for a total of 540 km. It was possible to win one and not the other.)	Medio Madonie	Targa Florio	432 km	6h 33m	(Germany) Christian Werner	Mercedes M72/94 PP TF	Report
27 Apr	(Italy) VII Coppa Florio	Medio Madonie	Targa Florio	540 km	8h 17m	(Germany) Christian Werner	Mercedes M72/94 PP TF	Report
4 May	(Italy) I Circuito del Belfiore	Belfiore	Formula Libre	255 km	2h 31m	(Italy) Antonio Masperi	Bianchi 18	Report
18 May	(Italy) I Coppa della Perugina	Perugia	Formula Libre	245 km	2h 46m	(Italy) Emilio Materassi	Itala 4.7L Special	Report
25 May	(Italy) II Circuito di Savio	Ravenna	Formula Libre	360 km	3h 18m	(Italy) Enzo Ferrari	Alfa Romeo RL SS	Report
30 May	(United States) XII International 500 Mile; Sweepstakes	Indianapolis	AAA	500 miles (800 km)	5h 05m	(United States) Joe Boyer (United States) L. L. Corum	Duesenberg	Report
1 Jun	(Italy) I Circuito del Polesine	Polesine	Formula Libre	300 km	2h 46m	(Italy) Enzo Ferrari	Alfa Romeo RL SS	Report
9 Jun	(Italy) II Circuito di Cremona	Cremona	Formula Libre	320 km	2h 02m	(Italy) Antonio Ascari	Alfa Romeo P2 8C/2000	Report
15 Jun	(Switzerland) I Grand Prix de Suisse Voiturette	Geneva	Voiturette	400 km	3h 34m	(United Kingdom) Kenelm Lee Guinness	Talbot-Darracq 70	Report
13 Jul	(Italy) I Coppa Acerbo	Pescara	Formula Libre	255 km	2h 27m	(Italy) Enzo Ferrari	Alfa Romeo RL TF	Report
13 Jul	(France) I Coupe de l’Autodrome	Miramas	Formula Libre	150 km	1h 06m	(Argentina) Martín de Álzaga	Sunbeam GP	Report
3 Aug	(France) XVIII French Grand Prix; II European Grand Prix	Lyon	AIACR	810 km	7h 06m	(Italy) Giuseppe Campari	Alfa Romeo P2 8C/2000	Report
17 Aug	(Italy) IV Coppa Montenero	Montenero	Formula Libre	180 km	2h 35m	(Italy) Renato Balestrero	OM 665	Report
30 Aug	(France) IV Grand Prix de Boulogne	Boulogne-sur-Mer	Voiturette; Cyclecar	450 km *	4h 16m *	(United Kingdom) Bunny Marshall	Bugatti Type 22	Report
31 Aug	(Italy) V Circuito di Mugello	Mugello	Formula Libre	390 km	5h 56m	(Italy) Giuseppe Morandi	OM 665	Report
20 Sep	(United Kingdom) III Junior Car Club 200	Brooklands	Voiturette; Cyclecar	200 miles (320 km)	1h 59m	(United Kingdom) Kenelm Lee Guinness	Talbot-Darracq 70	Report
27 Sep	(Spain) II Gran Premio de Velocidad de San Sebastián	Lasarte	AIACR	620 km	6h 01m	(United Kingdom) Henry Segrave	Sunbeam	Report
19 Oct	(France) Grand Prix de l’Ouverture	Montlhéry	Voiturette	25 km	8m	(United Kingdom) J. G. Parry-Thomas	Leyland-Thomas Special	Report
19 Oct**	(Italy) IV Italian Grand Prix	Monza	AIACR	800 km	5h 02m	(Italy) Antonio Ascari	Alfa Romeo P2 8C/2000	Report
9 Nov	(Italy) IV Circuito del Garda	Salò	Formula Libre	250 km	3h 03m	(Italy) Guido Meregalli	Diatto Tipo 20 S	Report

Note *: Race reduced from 12 to 10 laps (375 km) because of bad weather. Note **: Race had been postponed from 7 September.

== Regulations and technical ==
The third year of the AIACR (forerunner of the FIA) 2-litre regulations for Grand Prix races remained unchanged. In the United States, the American Automobile Association (AAA) stayed with the same regulations as well – the only difference being that the AAA no longer required a mandatory mechanic on-board so single-seater cars became popular.

The Targa Florio regulations remained open to any sized cars. The only change was that the smallest engine class (up to 1.1-litres) was further split to create an even smaller class up to 750cc.

Unsurprisingly, after the dominance of the supercharged Fiat 805 the previous year, many companies looked at creating their own supercharged model. Fiat continued to develop their successful supercharged 805 model, improving its power output from 130 to 145 bhp.

Sunbeam installed a Roots supercharger to their Grand Prix engine, lifting its power output from 105 to 138 bhp. Instead of forcing air into the carburettor, this new supercharger forced a fuel-air mixture direct into the engine. Sunbeam were the first team to use this version of supercharging. The improved engine was placed into a new, lower chassis.

At Alfa Romeo, Vittorio Jano developed upon the ill-fated P1 model with the new P2. He designed a new twin-cam 2-litre straight-8 engine, with a Roots-type supercharger attached. This put out 145 bhp making it capable of 225 km/h, faster than any of its competition. At the start of the year, Jano had hired the 20-year old Gioacchino Colombo as his apprentice and personal assistant. Together, the pair would develop some of the great racing cars of the 1920s and '30s.

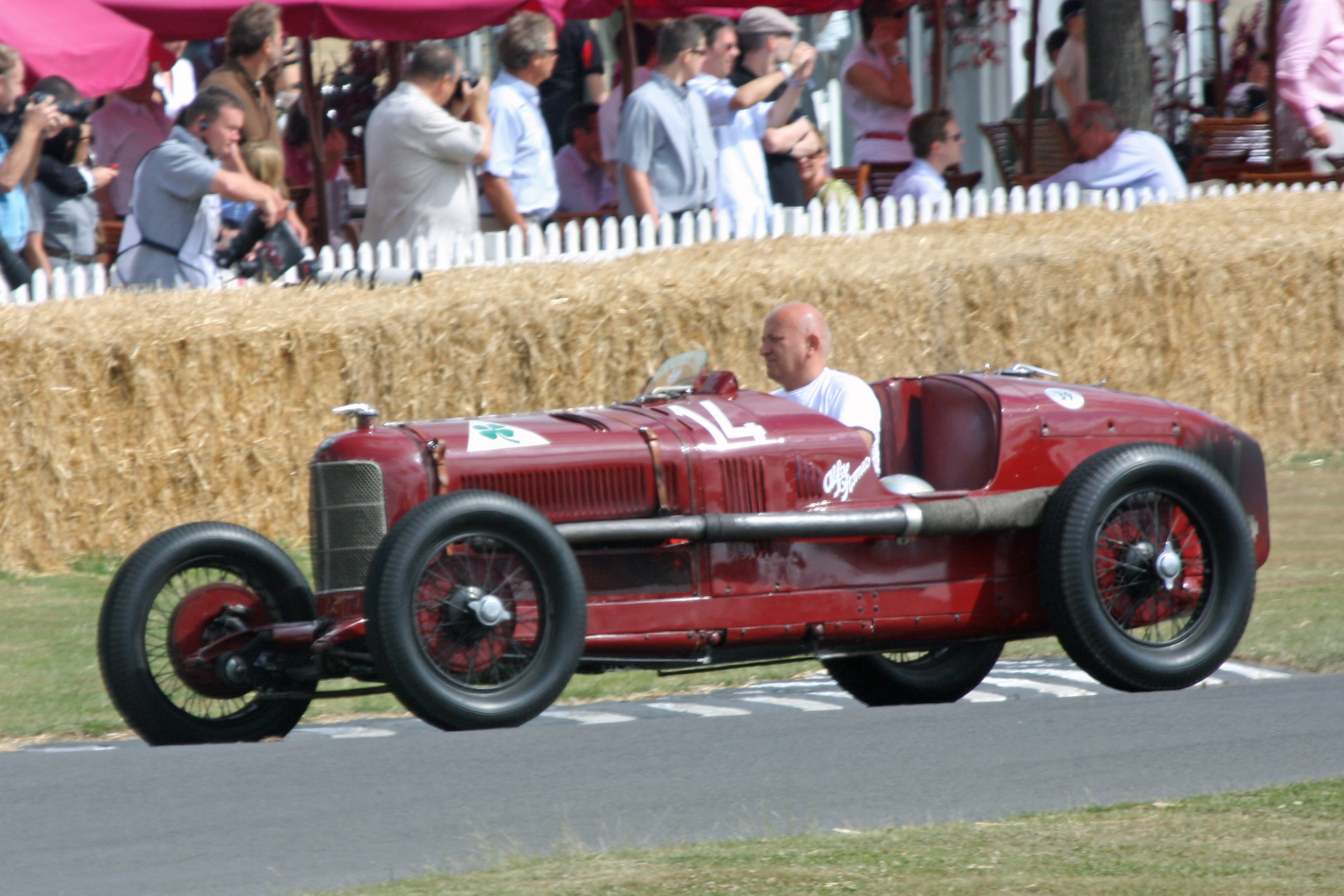
Alfa Romeo P2

1924 also saw the advent of Ettore Bugatti's iconic Type 35, the car that would become his most successful racing model. The 2-litre straight-8 engine was an evolution of that of the Type 29 and could rev up to 6000rpm . It was also fitted with cast aluminium wheels with integral brake drums to allow both break discs and tyres to be replaced during a pit stop.

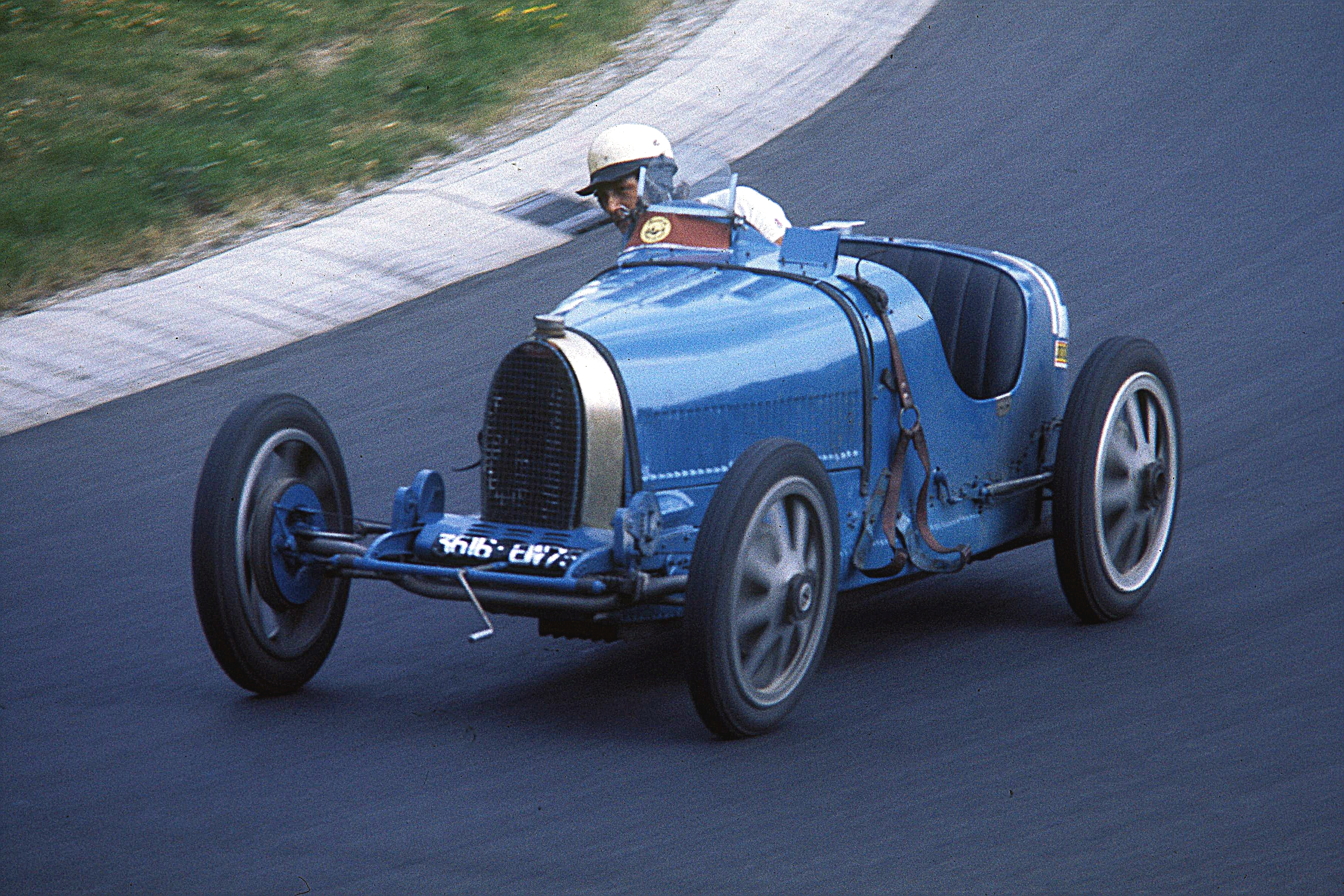
Bugatti Type 35

The Delage V12 engine was designed by Charles Planchon, a cousin of Louis Delage. It had four overhead camshafts and twin carburettors. However, the chassis of the 2LCV was soon found to be unable to cope with the engine-power. This year, the small company Rolland-Pilain adopted the innovative Swiss Schmid engine. The 2-litre twin-cam was a sleeve-valve engine that had eight valves on each of its six cylinders. All three French manufacturers deemed a supercharger an unnecessary addition.

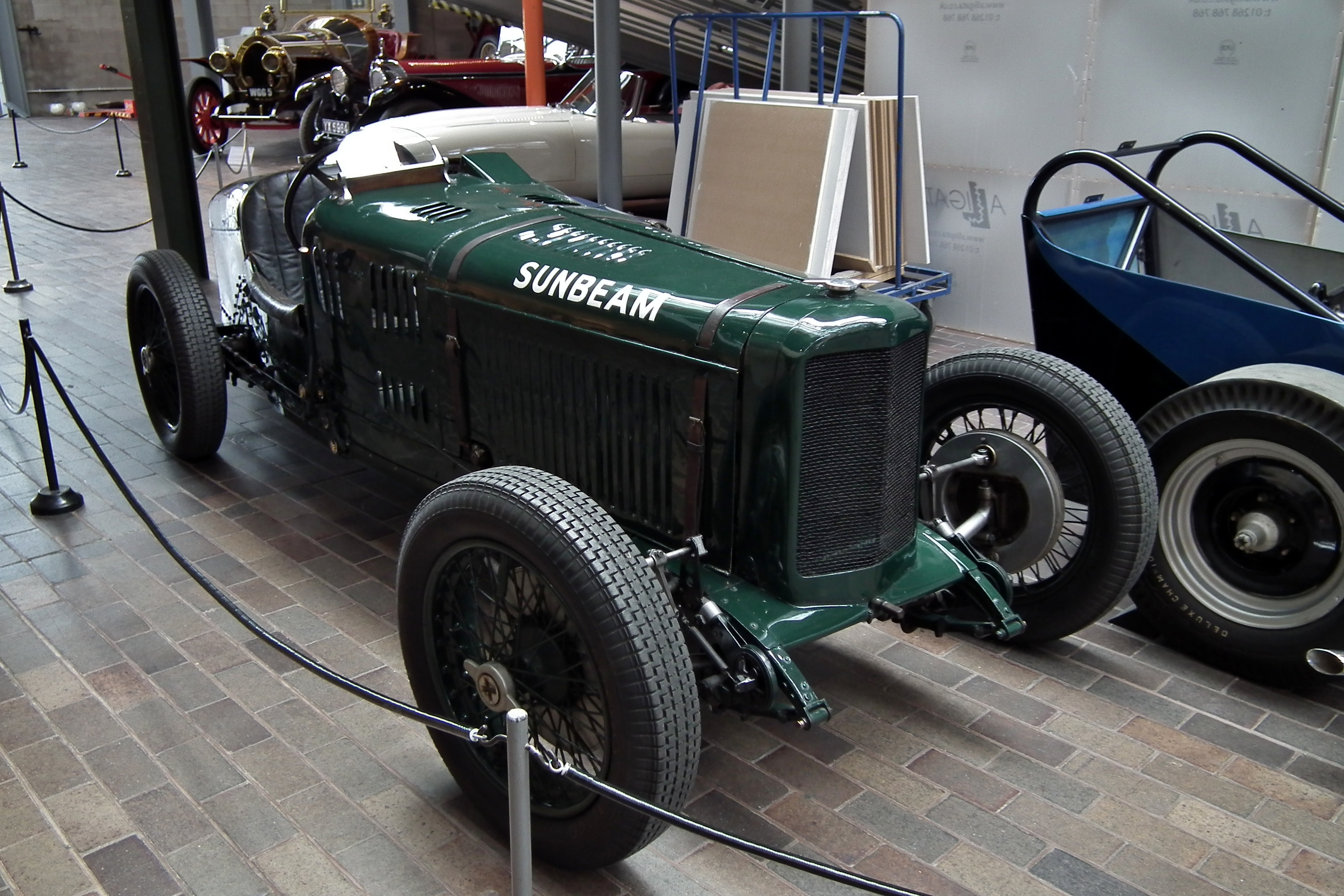
Sunbeam GP

Ferdinand Porsche, having recently arrived from Austro-Daimler, put a supercharger on the current racing Mercedes, the M72/94. Halfway through the season the new Mercedes M218 arrived. The supercharged 2-litre, straight-8 engine was fitted with four valves per cylinder and generated up to 7000rpm, a level unprecedented in grand prix cars to that time. Unlike other manufacturers, Porsche mounted the supercharger behind the engine.

Manufacturer	Model	Engine	Power Output	Max. Speed (km/h)	Dry Weight (kg)
(Italy) Alfa Romeo	P2 8C/2000	Alfa Romeo 1987cc S8 supercharged	145 bhp	225	750
(Italy) Fiat	805-405	FIAT 1979cc S6 supercharged	145 bhp		680
(France) Bugatti	Type 35	Bugatti 1991cc S8	90 bhp	180	750
(France) Delage	2LCV	Delage 1983cc V12	120 bhp	215	1065
(France) Rolland-Pilain (Switzerland)	GP	Schmid 1980cc S6			
(Germany) Mercedes	M72/94 PP TF	Mercedes 1990cc S4 supercharged	120 bhp	185	870
(Germany) Mercedes	M218	Mercedes 1980cc S8 supercharged	170 bhp	210	660
(United Kingdom) Sunbeam	GP	Sunbeam 1988cc S4 supercharged	138 bhp	200	680
(United States) Duesenberg	122	Duesenberg 1984cc S8 supercharged			
(United States) Miller	122	Miller 1978cc S8	120 bhp	186	850

Another new circuit was constructed in 1924. French industrialist Alexandre Lamblin (who also owned the magazine L’Aero Sports) saw the merits of the closed circuits being built in other countries and the need for a test-track for French manufacturers. A 2.5 km banked oval was opened in the middle of the year at Montlhéry, about 30 km southwest of Paris. At the end of the year, the road-course extension was completed adding a further 10 km to the track. The first display races were in October alongside the fourth Grand Prix du M.C.F. for cyclecars. Also in 1924 races were held at the new 5 km oval at Miramas, on the southern coast of France

== Season review ==
=== 1924 Targa Florio ===
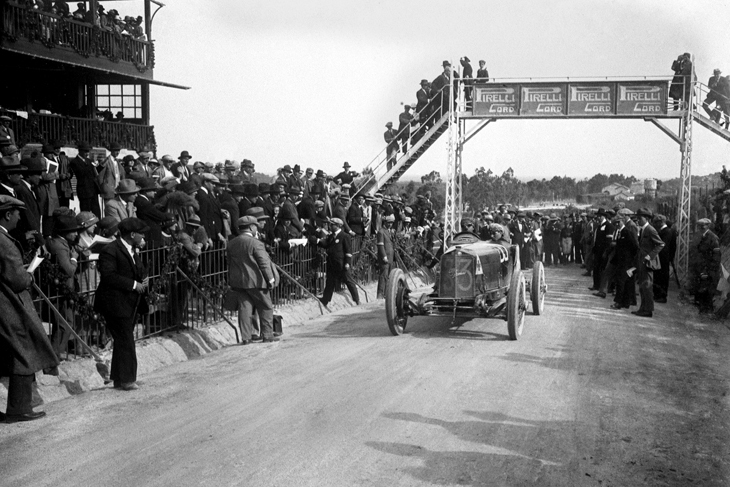
Campari, in an Alfa Romeo, starting the Targa Florio

The first chance for the prospective competition to meet was at the Targa Florio. Run across four laps the Madonie circuit from the coast to the mountains of northern Sicily. This year the associated Coppa Florio was merged in the same event, with entrants running an additional fifth lap of the circuit.

The Alfa Corse works team arrived with four of their successful RLTF sports cars. Their regular drivers Antonio Ascari and Giuseppe Campari were joined this year by Frenchman Louis Wagner, while gentleman-driver and 1921&22 winner Conte Giulio Masetti entered his own. They were joined by the Fiat team with supercharged 805-405 models for Pietro Bordino and Carlo Salomano, while Giuseppe Pastore raced a 5-litre Fiat 519.

A strong German contingent was led by Mercedes, returning after having travelled in the previous year to the US for the 1923 Indianapolis 500 were they introduced supercharged engines. Their M72/94 models were now painted red to blend in with Italians, and raced by regular team drivers Christian Werner, Alfred Neubauer and their hero of the 1908 and 1914 French Grand Prix wins, Christian Lautenschlager. There were also teams from Steiger and AGA along with 50000 German fans who filled the hotels in Palermo. The Austrian Steyr company had three of their Type VI Klausen sports models for Ferdinando Minoia, Conte Gastone Brilli-Peri and Herrmann Rützler. The French were also represented, with teams entered by Peugeot and Ballot. André Boillot, Giulio Foresti and Christian d'Auvergne ran the 4-litre Peugeot 174 Sports, and Jules Goux and Jean Haimovici gave the Ballot 2LS another run. Along with teams from the smaller Italian manufacturers, there were an impressive 38 entries.

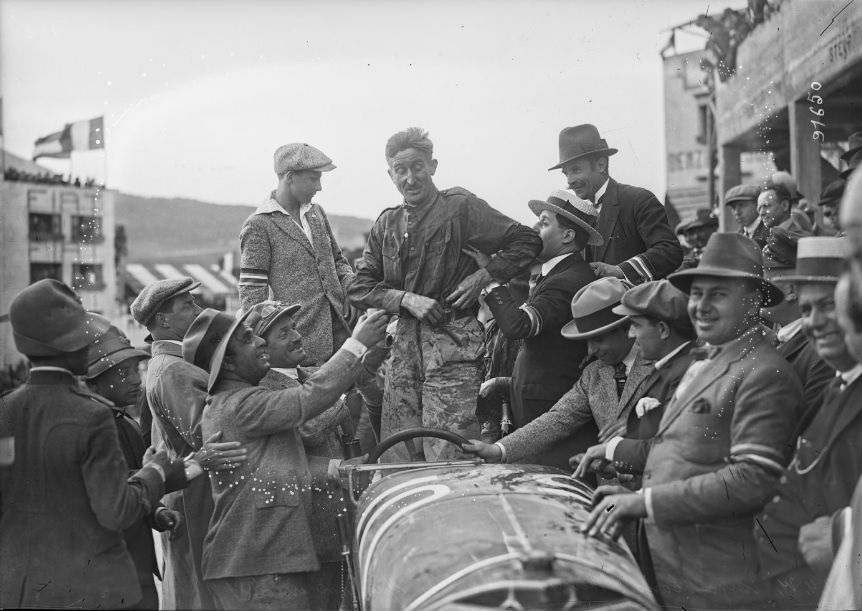
Christian Werner, winner of the Targa Florio, for Mercedes

At the end of the first lap, Masetti was leading on elapsed time. However, he gradually slipped back with tyre problems, and Werner was leading from Ascari at the end of the next. On the last lap Werner had built a 3-minute lead and when he crossed the line there was an anxious wait for Ascari who had started 28 minutes after him. But for the second race in a row, Ascari spun his Alfa within sight of the finish line when his engine seized. He and his mechanic were unable to push-start it again and were then disqualified for help from the over-enthusiastic crowd getting them across the line. Second fell to Masetti almost ten minutes back while Bordino bought his Fiat to third with Campari's Alfa fourth. On for the extra lap for the Coppa Florio, Nazzaro, in his last major race, had taken over from an exhausted Bordino but the car caught fire and could not finish. Werner returned to Germany a national hero, while Porsche was awarded an honorary doctorate from the University of Stuttgart.

Conte Vincenzo Florio had originally envisioned the Coppa Florio to be awarded the most successful marque or entrant after seven races, with Italian S.C.A.T. winning three times until 1914. However, by a strange quirk every race had been won by a different manufacturer, so the trophy remained unawarded.

=== 1924 Indianapolis 500 ===
The majority of entries in the 1924 Indianapolis 500 were driving the nimble, fast Miller 122. Harry Miller had his own two-car team with drivers Bennett Hill and Jules Ellingboe. Cliff Durant's five-car team included Harry Hartz and Eddie Hearne. Two-time winner Tommy Milton had his own team, as did Grand Prix winner Jimmy Murphy and former AAA champion Earl Cooper.

The stiffest competition would be from Fred Duesenberg. He fitted superchargers to three of his cars, driven by Joe Boyer, L. L. Corum and rookie Ernie Ansterburg, while Peter DePaolo, nephew and former riding mechanic of Ralph DePalma, ran the fourth, unblown, car. The other entrants included Ora Haibe with his privateer Mercedes, and the Barber-Warnock team running three Frontenac-Fords. Their drivers included Englishman Alfred Moss, father of future racing great Stirling Moss. This year riding mechanics were optional, however, no drivers utilised them.

Murphy was fastest qualifier and shared the front row with Hartz and Milton. Boyer was the best Duesenberg, starting fifth on the second row, and bolted straight to the front. Then on the second lap, his teammate Ansterburg went crashed into the wall and Boyer's supercharger gave out. This left Murphy leading the Millers of Cooper, Hill and Hartz, then Corum's Duesenberg. He and Cooper fought for the lead for most of the race.

Meanwhile, Corum brought his car in for a pitstop on lap 111. Fred Duesenberg put Boyer, his top driver, in the car telling him to push hard, while Corum in turn took over Boyer's delayed car. Boyer soon overtook Hartz and Hill to get up to third. As the leading pair's tyres wore out, he managed to haul them in and take the lead with 24 laps to go. He won by just under ninety seconds from Cooper with Murphy coming home in third. Corum was the first winner who was a starting driver, but not racing his car at the end after an intervening relief driver had assisted. Corum and Boyer were therefore announced as the first co-winners of the Indianapolis 500. Their race was done at a record speed of 98.2 mph and the first win for Duesenberg who had competed since the second race in 1912.

From six starts, Jimmy Murphy got three wins and a third, to comfortably win the 9-race AAA season from Earl Cooper and Bennett Hill.

=== 1924 Grands Prix ===
With the increasing support and crowd interest in Italian motor-racing, a raft of new events was springing up across the country. In April, the great Tazio Nuvolari got his first victory on four wheels at the inaugural Circuito del Tigullio, near Genoa, in a Bianchi. The new Alfa Romeo P2 was unveiled in June at the fast local circuit at the city of Cremona, giving the race an auspicious status. Antonio Ascari won for the works team first time out, finishing nearly an hour ahead of his nearest rival. In July, the first Coppa Acerbo was held on the Pescara Circuit. It was won by Enzo Ferrari in an older Alfa Romeo RL and he was given the title Commendatore by Italian premier Benito Mussolini.

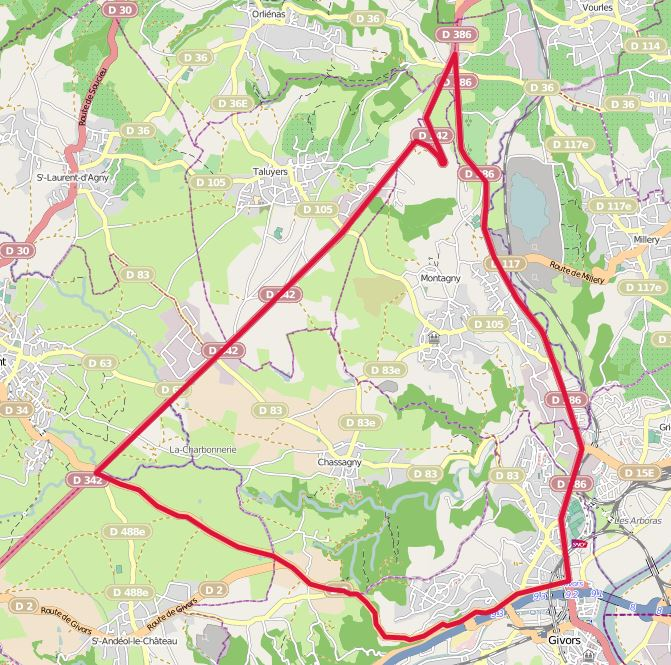
The shortened circuit at Lyon for the French GP

The French Grand Prix returned to Lyon using an abbreviated version of the track last used for the epic 1914 Grand Prix. It was shortened to a 23 km track cutting out the back end of the run out to Châteauneuf while still incorporating le piege de la mort (Death Trap) - the infamous steep downhill right-left switchback, and hairpin at Les Sept Chemins.

Once again, like ten years earlier, the entry list promised a great showdown. Bugatti unveiled its new Type 35 with a works team of five drivers: Jean Chassagne, Ernest Friderich, Pierre de Vizcaya, Meo Costantini and Leonico Garnier. Presenting a strong French line-up, they were joined by the Delage works team of veteran René Thomas, Albert Divo and new driver Robert Benoist. The other French team was Rolland-Pilain, this year fitted with a Swiss Schmid engine, with the experienced Jules Goux and Giulio Foresti.

They were up against a very strong Italian challenge. The Fiat team had their supercharged 805 with Pietro Bordino, Giuseppe Pastore, Onesimo Marchisio and the great Felice Nazzaro. Alfa Romeo brought four of the new P2 cars for their regular driver line-up of Campari, Ascari, Wagner and Ferrari. The other entries were from Great Britain. Sunbeam, surprise winners the year before, had three cars ready for Henry Segrave, Kenelm Lee Guinness and Dario Resta. The final entry was Count Louis Zborowski racing his American Miller 122 he had taken to race in Spain in 1923.

Foresti crashed in practice and Ferrari did not take the start because of mental exhaustion. At the beginning of 35 laps, it was Segrave who had drawn pole position who took the lead. He held it until he had to pit with a misfire on lap 3 to change plugs. Bordino had come through the field getting his Fiat into the lead, pursued by Ascari, while Guinness and Campari tussled for third. On lap 9, Ascari moved into the lead when Bordino had to pit with fading brakes, as did his teammate Nazzaro. The Sunbeam challenge was blunted when Guinness retired with crankshaft problems. Segrave brought his misfiring car back up through the field but only managed to reach sixth (while also setting the fastest lap time). Ascari was charging to victory when he suddenly slowed with just three laps to go. He was overtaken by Campari and Divo and he was forced to pit. When he could not restart the engine, his race was done. Campari held on to win the race with Divo just a minute behind in his Delage. His teammate Benoist was a further ten minutes back in third and Wagner was fourth in his Alfa.

The second San Sebastián Grand Prix got a strong international field with Bugatti, Delage and Rolland-Pilain from France. They were up against Sunbeam, Mercedes and Diatto from Italy. In the absence of Alfa Romeo, French hopes were high for victory, but once again they were thwarted, this time by Sunbeam. At the start it was Masetti in the Mercedes who led until he retired with engine problems. Segrave narrowly won from Costantini's Bugatti and André Morel in a Delage. There were several crashes in the race, but the most serious incident was with the Sunbeam of Kenelm Lee Guinness. On lap 11 he hit a rut in a corner that threw him into the roadside banking which then rolled the car three times on the wet track. His mechanic, Tom Barrett, was killed instantly and Guinness suffered severe head and arm injuries that curtailed his racing career. The race was also significant for being where Segrave pioneered the wearing of a crash helmet in racing.

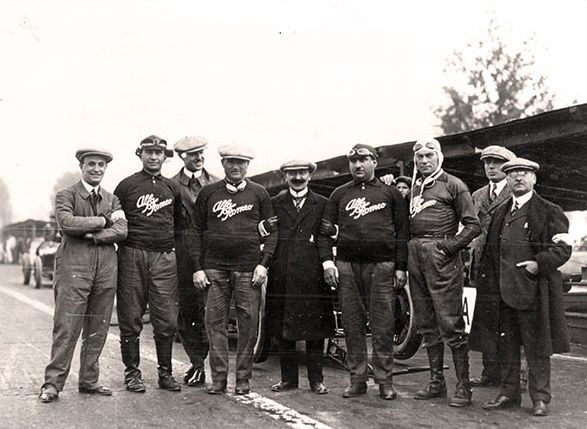
The 1924 Alfa Romeo team: Nicola Romeo (centre) flanked by his drivers Minoia, Ascari, Campari and Wagner (left to right in the Alfa jerseys)

For the Italian Grand Prix, again the major non-Italian manufacturers stayed away. After Salamano was injured practising and Bordino was suffering a recurrence of pain in his shoulder, the Fiat team also announced it would be a non-starter. The race had originally been scheduled for September, but when Mercedes also cited technical issues with their new cars the organisers postponed the race six weeks.

So at the rescheduled race, there were only four teams present: Alfa Romeo were the clear favourites with four cars for Campari, Ascari, Wagner and Ferdinando Minoia. The other Italian manufacturer was the small Chiribiri team who arrived with a pair of 1500cc sports cars. Rolland-Pilain came from France with Goux and Foresti. The final team was the entry from Mercedes. There were four of the supercharged M218 cars for Targa Florio heroes Christian Werner and Italian Giulio Masetti, as well as Alfred Neubauer and Count Zborowski.

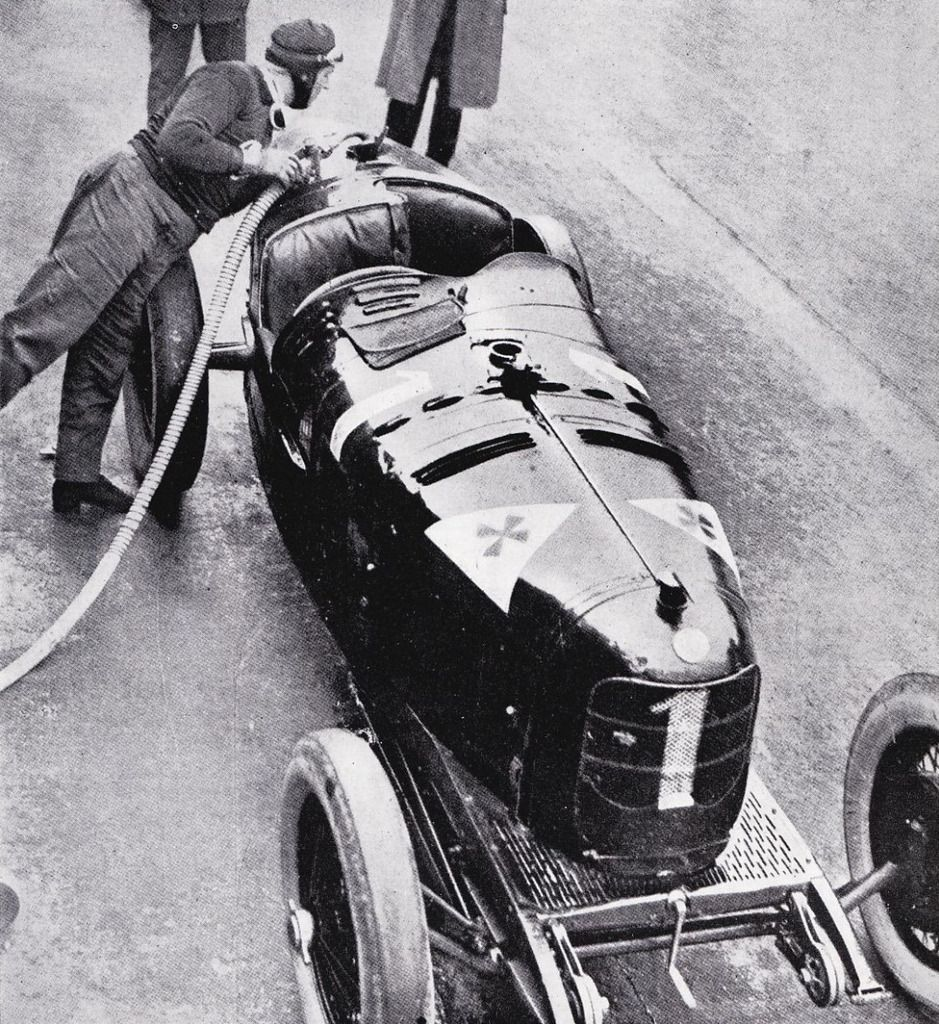
Monza: Ascari's Alfa Romeo being refuelled

The postponement and bad weather meant there was a much smaller crowd than in previous years. In practice, the Mercedes of Werner and Masetti were fastest. Ascari took the lead from the start and held it through the race. He was only briefly challenged by Masetti's Mercedes until it was overtaken by the other Alfas. On lap 50, Zborowski had pitted to change his Mercedes’ spark plugs but in his haste to make up time on his out-lap he went off at the Lesmo corner, hit a tree and was killed. The remaining Mercedes cars were withdrawn. This removed any competition and the Alfa Romeo team had an easy 1-2-3-4 result. Ascari made up for his disappointment in France to win, finishing 15 minutes ahead of Wagner and his teammates. Ascari's race speed average of 158.9 km/h (98.7 mph) was faster than Boyer's win at Indianapolis. After the trials and tribulations, Mercedes never raced the M218 again.

It was a tragic year for racing fatalities, including Zborowski's death at Monza. September was a grim month when three Indianapolis 500 winners were killed, Joe Boyer was killed at Altoona Speedway. He was chasing down Jimmy Murphy when a tyre blew out, and he crashed at 200 km/h, suffering fatal injuries. Contemporary reports say he deliberately drove up into the banking rail instead of into the crowds in the infield. Just a fortnight later, Murphy himself was killed at Syracuse when duelling for the lead in the AAA race. He crashed into the inside fence and was impaled by one of the boards. He would become the AAA's first posthumous champion. In between, Anglo-Italian Dario Resta (winner in 1915) was killed at Brooklands in a speed record attempt. A security-belt on his Sunbeam came loose, puncturing a tyre and sending the car careering into an iron fence. Resta was burned to death before help could arrive to save him. His riding mechanic, Bill Perkins, was severely injured. He had been assigned to Kenelm Lee Guinness for the upcoming San Sebastian Grand Prix, but his place taken by the unfortunate Barrett. Finally, Boyer's erstwhile Duesenberg teammate, Ernie Ansterburg, was killed in October when testing at the new wooden oval at Charlotte before its opening race.
