= Grand Prix motor racing =

Form of motor racing

Grand Prix motor racing, a form of motorsport competition, has its roots in organised automobile racing that began in France as early as 1894. It quickly evolved from simple road races between towns to endurance tests for car and driver. Innovation and the drive of competition soon saw speeds exceeding 100 miles per hour (160 km/h), but because early races took place on open roads, accidents occurred frequently, resulting in deaths both of drivers and of spectators. A common abbreviation used for Grand Prix racing is "GP" or "GP racing".

The Association Internationale des Automobile Clubs Reconnus, founded in Paris, on 20 June 1904, reorganised as Fédération Internationale de l'Automobile (FIA), in 1947, headquartered in Paris. Each event of the Formula One World Championships is still called a Grand Prix; Formula One is also referred to as "Grand Prix racing". Some IndyCar championship races are also called "Grands Prix".

== Origins of organised racing ==
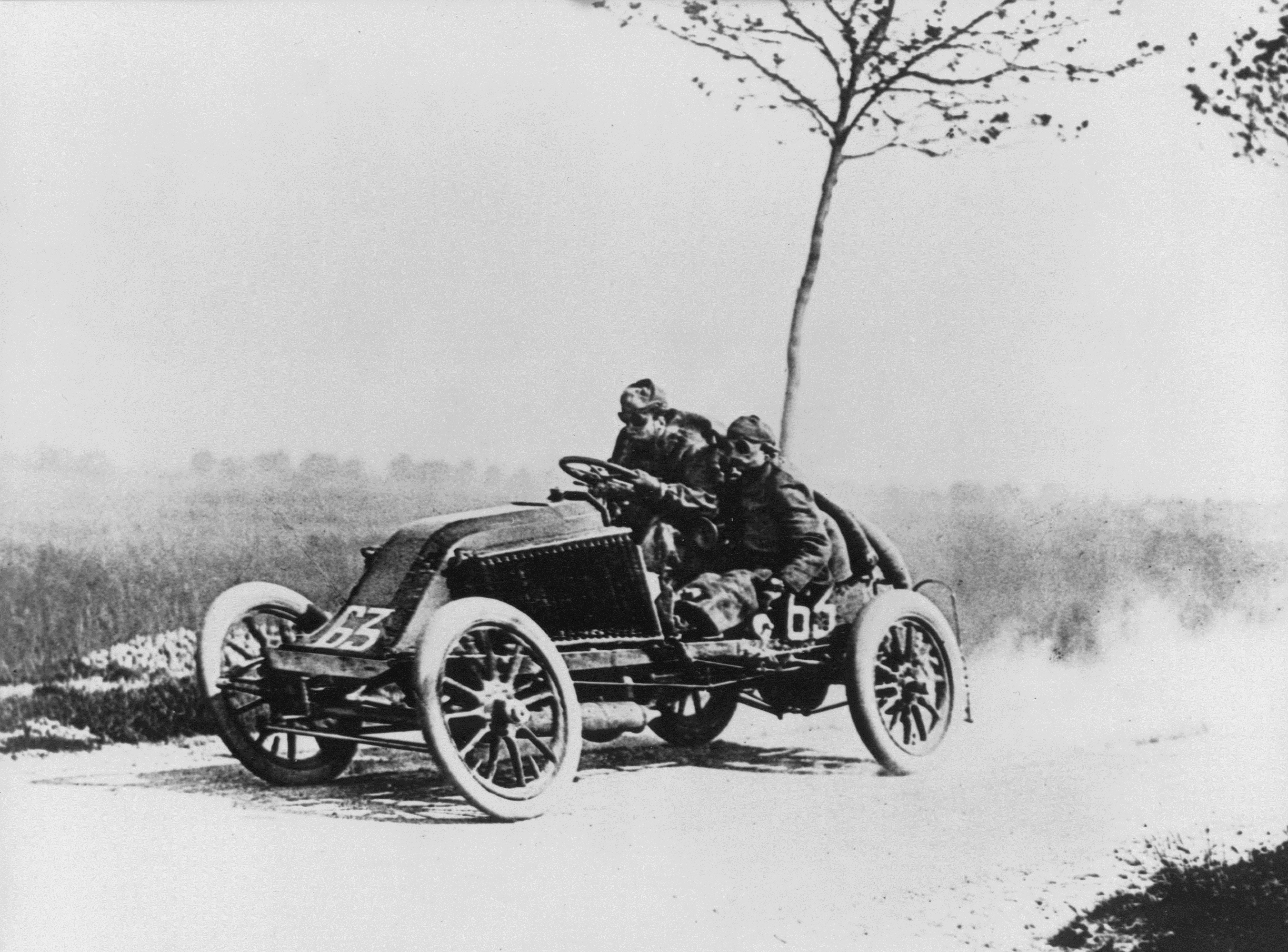
Marcel Renault during the 1903 Paris Madrid trial

Motor racing was started in France, as a direct result of the enthusiasm with which the French public embraced the motor car. Manufacturers were enthusiastic due to the possibility of using motor racing as a shop window for their cars. The first motoring contest took place on 22 July 1894, and was organised by a Paris newspaper, Le Petit Journal. The Paris–Rouen rally was 126 km (78 mi), from Porte Maillot in Paris, through the Bois de Boulogne, to Rouen. Count Jules-Albert de Dion was first into Rouen after 6 hours 48 minutes at an average speed of 19 km/h (12 mph). He finished 3 minutes 30 seconds ahead of Albert Lemaître (Peugeot), followed by Auguste Doriot (Peugeot, 16 minutes 30 seconds back), René Panhard (Panhard, 33 minutes 30 seconds back), and Émile Levassor (Panhard, 55 minutes 30 seconds back). The official winners were Peugeot and Panhard as cars were judged on their speed, handling and safety characteristics, and De Dion's steam car needed a stoker which the judges deemed to be outside of their objectives.

In 1900, James Gordon Bennett, Jr., the owner of the New York Herald and the International Herald Tribune, established the Gordon Bennett Cup. He hoped the creation of an international event would drive automobile manufacturers to improve their cars. Each country was allowed to enter up to three cars, which had to be fully built in the country that they represented and entered by that country's automotive governing body. International racing colours were established in this event. The 1903 event occurred in the aftermath of the fatalities at the Paris-Madrid road race, so the race, at Athy in Ireland, though on public roads, was run over a closed circuit: the first ever closed-circuit motor race. In the United States, William Kissam Vanderbilt II launched the Vanderbilt Cup at Long Island, New York, in 1904.

== First Grands Prix ==
=== Circuit du Sud-Ouest ===
Some anglophone sources wrongly list a race called the Pau Grand Prix in 1901. This may stem from a mistranslation of contemporary French sources such as the magazine La France Auto of March 1901. The name of the 1901 event was the Circuit du Sud-Ouest and it was run in three classes around the streets of Pau. The Grand Prix du Palais d'Hiver was the name of the prizes awarded for the lesser classes ('Light cars' and 'Voiturettes'). The Grand Prix de Pau was the name of the prize awarded for the 'Heavy' (fastest) class. Thus Maurice Farman was awarded the Grand Prix de Pau for his overall victory in the Circuit du Sud-Ouest driving a Panhard 24 hp. (Note: Racing within the city of Pau dates from 1900 when the first edition of the Circuit du Sud-Ouest was run in the city.: The first Circuit du Sud-Ouest on 25 February 1900 was won by René de Knyff in a Panhard 16 hp.) (Note: La France Automobile, March 1901 reports the results for the "Semaine de Pau" (Pau Week). There were two discrete events: the 140 km Course des touristes from Pau–Peyrehorade–Pau and the second edition of the Circuit du Sud-Ouest on 17 February 1901 around a course on the city outskirts. The Course des touristes comprised six prizes for the different classes of entrants. The Prix de la Presse was won by Barbereau (De Dietrich); the Prix du Commerce Palois was awarded to Henri Farman (Darracq); the Prix des Cercles was awarded to Rudeaux (Darracq); the Prix de l'Automobile Club Béarnais was won by 'Bergeon' (De Dietrich); the Prix de l'Automobile Club de France was awarded to Demeester (Gladiator) and Edmond (Darracq); the Prix de Palmarium was awarded to Cormier (De Dion). The Circuit du Sud-Ouest comprised four prizes for the different classes of entrants.: The Grand Prix de Pau was awarded to Maurice Farman (Panhard 24 hp).; The Grand Prix du Palais d'Hiver (400–650 kg 'Light car' class) was awarded to Henri Farman (Darracq).; The second Grand Prix du Palais d'Hiver for the under-400 kg Voiturettes class was awarded to Louis Renault (Renault).; The Prix du Béarn was awarded to Osmont in a 'De Dion' tricycle.) (Note: By the turn of the century, the term Grand Prix had become common parlance in France, having been used since the Grand Prix de Paris horse race in 1886 (e.g. the Grand Prix de Paris for Cyclists in 1895) (The New York Times, July 18, 1895, "Grand Prix de Paris for Cyclists"). In the Anglophone world, the main winner's prize (Grand Prix de Pau) subsequently became synonymous with the event. (Leif Snellman (27 May 2002). "The first Grand Prix". 8W. FORIX.)) In L'Histoire de l'Automobile/Paris 1907 Pierre Souvestre described the 1901 event as "in the Circuit du Sud-Ouest, at the meeting in Pau" ("dans le Circuit du Sud-Ouest, à l'occasion du meeting de Pau").

=== First Grand Prix and the Grandes Épreuves ===
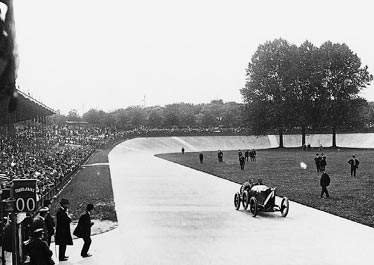
Georges Boillot winning the 1912 French Grand Prix in Dieppe, France

The only race at the time to regularly carry the name Grand Prix was organised by the Automobile Club de France (ACF), of which the first took place in 1906. The circuit used, which was based in Le Mans, was roughly triangular in shape, each lap covering 105 kilometres (65 mi). Six laps were to run each day, and each lap took approximately an hour using the relatively primitive cars of the day. The driving force behind the decision to race on a circuit – as opposed to racing on ordinary roads from town to town – was the Paris to Madrid road race of 1903. During this race a number of people, both drivers and pedestrians – including Marcel Renault – were killed and the race was stopped by the French authorities at Bordeaux. Further road-based events were banned.

From the 32 entries representing 12 different automobile manufacturers, at the 1906 event, the Hungarian-born Ferenc Szisz (1873–1944) won the 1,260 km (780 mi) race in a Renault. This race was regarded as the first Grande Épreuve, which meant "great trial" and the term was used from then on to denote up to the eight most important events of the year.

Races in this period were heavily nationalistic affairs, with a few countries setting up races of their own, but no formal championship tying them together. The rules varied from country to country and race to race, and typically centred on maximum (not minimum) weights in an effort to limit power by limiting engine size indirectly (10–15 L engines were quite common, usually with no more than four cylinders, and producing less than 50 hp). The cars all had mechanics on board as well as the driver, and no one was allowed to work on the cars during the race except for these two. A key factor to Renault winning this first Grand Prix was held to be the detachable wheel rims (developed by Michelin), which allowed tyre changes to occur without having to lever the tyre and tube off and back on the rim. Given the state of the roads, such repairs were frequent. Early Grand Prix cars could be technically innovative, with marques such as Peugeot using technology that would later become more widespread.

=== Political numbering and renaming ===
A further historic confusion arose in the early 1920s when the Automobile Club de France attempted to pull off a retrospective political trick by numbering and renaming the major races held in France before the 1906 French Grand Prix as being Grands Prix de l'Automobile Club de France, despite their running pre-dating the formation of the Club. Hence, the 1895 Paris–Bordeaux–Paris Trail was renamed I Grand Prix de l'Automobile Club de France; and the true first Grand Prix in 1906 race was renamed the IX Grand Prix de l'Automobile Club de France (9th). The ACF used this numbering in 1933, although some members of the Club dismissed it, "concerned the name of the Club was lent to the fiction simply out of a childish desire to establish their Grand Prix as the oldest race in the world".

== Racecourse development ==
For the most part, races were run over a lengthy circuit of closed public roads, not purpose-built private tracks. This was true of the Le Mans circuit of the 1906 Grand Prix, as well as the Targa Florio (run on 93 miles (150 km) of Sicilian roads), the 75 miles (121 km) German Kaiserpreis circuit in the Taunus mountains, and the French circuit at Dieppe (a mere 48 miles (77 km)), used for the 1907 Grand Prix. The exceptions were the steeply banked egg-shaped near oval of Brooklands in England, completed in 1907; the Indianapolis Motor Speedway, first used in 1909 with the first Indianapolis 500-Mile Race in 1911; and the Autodromo Nazionale di Monza, in Italy, opened in 1922.

In 1908, the United States of America became the first country outside France to host an automobile race using the name Grand Prix (or Grand Prize), run at Savannah. The first Grande Épreuve outside France was the 1921 Italian Grand Prix held at Montichiari. This was quickly followed by Belgium and Spain (in 1924), and later spread to other countries including Britain (1926). Strictly speaking, this still was not a formal championship, but a loose collection of races run to various rules. (A "formula" of rules had appeared just before World War I, finally based on engine size as well as weight, but it was not universally adopted.)

In 1904, many national motor clubs banded together to form the Association Internationale des Automobile Clubs Reconnus (AIACR). In 1922 the Commission Sportive Internationale (CSI) was empowered on behalf of AIACR to regulate Grand Prix racing and other forms of international racing. Since the inception of Grand Prix racing, competitions had been run in accordance with a strict formula based on engine size and vehicle weight. These regulations were virtually abandoned in 1928 with an era known as Formula Libre when race organisers decided to run their events with almost no limitations. From 1927 to 1934, the number of races considered to have Grand Prix status exploded, jumping from five events in 1927, to nine events in 1929, to eighteen in 1934 (the peak year before World War II).

During this period a lot of changes of rules occurred. There was a mass start for the first time at the 1922 French Grand Prix in Strasbourg. The 1925 season was the first season during which no riding mechanic was required in a car, as this rule was repealed in Europe after the death of Tom Barrett during the 1924 Grand Prix season. At the Solituderennen in 1926 a well thought-out system, with flags and boards, giving drivers tactical information, was used for the first time by Alfred Neubauer, the racing manager of the Mercedes-Benz team. The 1933 Monaco Grand Prix was the first time in the history of the sport that the grid was determined by timed qualifying rather than the luck of a draw.

== Pre-World War II years ==
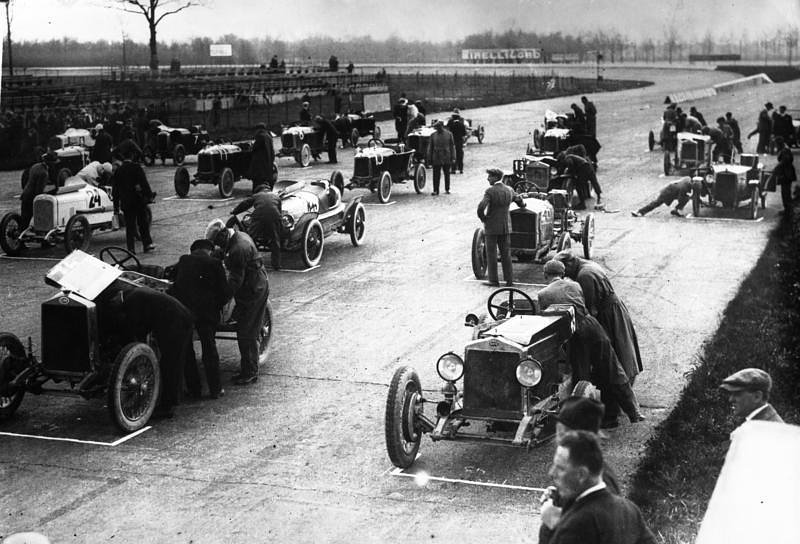
Grid of Coppa Fiera di Milano 1925

All the competing vehicles were painted in the international auto racing colors:

- blue (Bleu de France) for France,
- green (British racing green) for the United Kingdom,
- red (Rosso corsa) for Italy,
- white for Germany,
  - Note: beginning in 1934, the Germans stopped painting their cars, allegedly after the paint had been left off a Mercedes-Benz W25 in an effort to reduce weight. The unpainted metal soon had the German vehicles dubbed by the media as the "Silver Arrows". However, there are conflicting versions of how German Grand Prix cars came to be unpainted. Photos exist of unpainted Mercedes and Auto Union cars as early as 1932.
- yellow for Belgium.

French cars continued to dominate (led by Bugatti, but also including Delage and Delahaye) until the late 1920s, when the Italians (Alfa Romeo and Maserati) began to beat the French cars regularly. At the time, the Germans engineered unique race vehicles as seen in the photo here with the Benz aerodynamic "teardrop" body introduced at the 1923 European Grand Prix at Monza by Karl Benz.

In the 1930s, however, nationalism entered a new phase when the Nazis encouraged Mercedes and Auto Union to participate for propaganda reasons. (The government did provide some money to the two manufacturers, but the extent of the aid into their hands was exaggerated in the media; government subsidies amounted to perhaps 10% or less of the costs of running the two racing teams.) The two German marques utterly dominated the period from 1935 to 1939, winning all but three of the official Championship Grands Prix races run in those years. The cars by this time were single-seaters (the riding mechanic vanished in the early 1920s), with 8 to 16 cylinder supercharged engines producing upwards of 600 hp (450 kW) on alcohol fuels.

As early as October 1923, the idea of a championship was discussed at the annual autumn conference of the AIACR (Association Internationale des Automobile Clubs Reconnus) in Paris. However, discussion centred on the increased interest in racing by manufacturers and holding the first European Grand Prix at Monza in 1923. The first World Championship took place in 1925, but it was for manufacturers only, consisting of four races of at least 800 km (497 mi) in length. The races that formed the first Constructors' Championship were the Indianapolis 500, the European Grand Prix, and the French and Italian Grands Prix. This world championship was officially cancelled in 1930, but in 1928–1930 no titles were awarded. Subsequently, a European Drivers' Championship, consisting of the major Grands Prix in a number of countries (named Grandes Épreuves) was instituted in 1931, and was competed every year until the outbreak of World War II in 1939 with the exception of the 1933 and 1934 seasons.

== Post-war years and Formula One ==
In 1946, following World War II, only four races of Grand Prix calibre were held. Rules for a Grand Prix World Championship had been laid out before World War II, but it took several years afterward until 1947 when the old AIACR reorganised itself as the Fédération Internationale de l'Automobile or "FIA" for short, headquartered in Paris. It announced the new International Formula, also known as Formula 1 or Formula A, to be effective from 1947. At the end of the 1949 season the FIA announced that for 1950 they would be linking several national Formula One Grands Prix to create a World Championship for drivers, although due to economic difficulties the years 1952 and 1953 were actually competed in Formula Two cars. A points system was established and a total of seven races were granted championship status including the Indianapolis 500. The first World Championship race was held on 13 May 1950 at Silverstone in the United Kingdom.

The Italians once again did well in these early World Championship races, both manufacturers and drivers. The first World Champion was Giuseppe Farina, driving an Alfa Romeo. Ferrari appeared at the second World Championship race, in Monaco, and has the distinction of being the only manufacturer to compete in every season of the World Championship, still competing in 2026.

== Grandes Épreuves by season ==
Italics denote that the race was also known as the European Grand Prix.

=== 1906–1914 ===
Race	1906	1907	1908	1912	1913	1914
1	(France) French	(France) French	(France) French	(France) French	(France) French	(France) French

=== 1921–1929 ===
Race	1921	1922	1923	1924	1925	1926	1927	1928	1929
1	(France) French	(France) French	(United States) Indy 500	(United States) Indy 500	(United States) Indy 500	(United States) Indy 500	(United States) Indy 500	(United States) Indy 500	(United States) Indy 500
2	(Italy) Italian	(Italy) Italian	(France) French	(France) French	(Belgium) Belgian	(France) French	(France) French	(Italy) Italian	(France) French
3			(Italy) Italian	(Italy) Italian	(France) French	(Spain) San Sebastián	(Spain) Spanish		
4					(Italy) Italian	(United Kingdom) British	(Italy) Italian		
5						(Italy) Italian	(United Kingdom) British		

=== 1930–1939 ===
Race	1930	1931	1932	1933	1934	1935	1936	1937	1938	1939
1	(United States) Indy 500	(Italy) Italian	(Italy) Italian	Monaco	Monaco	Monaco	Monaco	(Belgium) Belgian	(France) French	(Belgium) Belgian
2	(Belgium) Belgian	(France) French	(France) French	(France) French	(France) French	(France) French	(Germany) German	(Germany) German	(Germany) German	(France) French
3	(France) French	(Belgium) Belgian	(Germany) German	(Belgium) Belgian	(Germany) German	(Belgium) Belgian	(Switzerland) Swiss	Monaco	(Switzerland) Swiss	(Germany) German
4		(Germany) German		(Italy) Italian	(Belgium) Belgian	(Germany) German	(Italy) Italian	(Switzerland) Swiss	(Italy) Italian	(Switzerland) Swiss
5				(Spain) Spanish	(Italy) Italian	(Switzerland) Swiss		(Italy) Italian		
6					(Spain) Spanish	(Italy) Italian				
7						(Spain) Spanish				

=== 1940–1945 ===
For wartime events, see Grands Prix during World War II.

=== 1946–1949 ===
Race	1947	1948	1949
1	(Switzerland) Swiss	Monaco	(United Kingdom) British
2	(Belgium) Belgian	(Switzerland) Swiss	(Belgium) Belgian
3	(Italy) Italian	(France) French	(Switzerland) Swiss
4	(France) French	(Italy) Italian	(France) French
5			(Italy) Italian

=== Other events ===
- Argentine Grand Prix
- Australian Grand Prix
- Bari Grand Prix
- Belgian Grand Prix
- Belgrade Grand Prix
- Buenos Aires Grand Prix
- Chilean Grand Prix
- Coppa Acerbo
- Coppa Ciano
- Cuban Grand Prix
- Czechoslovakian Grand Prix
- Danish Grand Prix
- Donington Grand Prix
- Dutch Grand Prix
- Eläintarhanajot
- Gezira Grand Prix
- Hungarian Grand Prix
- Indonesian Grand Prix
- Lwów Grand Prix
- Mille Miglia
- Moroccan Grand Prix
- Mozambique Grand Prix
- New Zealand Grand Prix
- Penya Rhin Grand Prix
- Rhodesian Grand Prix
- Russian Grand Prix
- San Sebastián Grand Prix
- Stockholm Grand Prix (Formula Two)
- Swedish Summer Grand Prix
- Swedish Winter Grand Prix
- Targa Florio
- Tripoli Grand Prix
- Tunis Grand Prix
- United States Grand Prix
- Vanderbilt Cup

See also:

- List of major automobile races in France
- List of major automobile races in Germany
- List of major automobile races in Italy

== Grand Prix drivers ==
Notable drivers of the Grand Prix motor racing era included a few women who competed equally with the men:

- Martín de Álzaga – Argentina
- Antonio Ascari – Italy
- Robert Benoist – France
- Clemente Biondetti – Italy
- Georges Boillot – France
- Manfred von Brauchitsch – Germany
- (United Kingdom) Malcolm Campbell – Great Britain
- Rudolf Caracciola – Germany
- / Luigi Chinetti – Italy; United States after the war
- Louis Chiron – Monaco
- Albert Divo – France
- René Dreyfus – France
- Philippe Étancelin – France
- Luigi Fagioli – Italy
- Giuseppe Farina – Italy; he became the first Formula One champion
- Enzo Ferrari – Italy
- Jules Goux – France
- László Hartmann – Hungary
- Elizabeth Junek – Czechoslovakia
- Hermann Lang – Germany
- Christian Lautenschlager – Germany
- Emilio Materassi – Italy
- Ferdinando Minoia – Italy
- Felice Nazzaro – Italy
- (France) Guy Moll – Algeria
- Hellé Nice – France
- Tazio Nuvolari – Italy
- (United Kingdom) Kay Petre – Great Britain
- Charles Pozzi – France
- Georges Philippe (Baron Philippe de Rothschild) – France
- Bernd Rosemeyer – Germany
- (United Kingdom) Richard Seaman – Great Britain
- (United Kingdom) Henry Segrave – Great Britain
- Raymond Sommer – France
- (United Kingdom) Whitney Willard Straight – Great Britain
- Hans Stuck – Germany
- Ferenc Szisz – Hungary
- Achille Varzi – Italy
- Emilio Villoresi – Italy
- Luigi Villoresi – Italy
- (United Kingdom) William Grover-Williams – Great Britain
- Jean-Pierre Wimille – France
- Juan Zanelli – Chile

== Championships ==
From 1925 onwards, the AIACR and later the FIA organised World and European Championships for Grand Prix manufacturers, drivers and constructors:

- World Manufacturers' Championship (1925–1927)
- European Drivers' Championship (1931–1932, 1935–1939)
- World Drivers' Championship (1950–1980)
- International Cup for Constructors (1958–1980)
- Formula One World Drivers' Championship (1981–present)
- Formula One World Constructors' Championship (1981–present)

== Notes ==
- 1st Grand Prix de l'Automobile Club de France – 1895 Paris–Bordeaux–Paris.
- 2nd Grand Prix de l'Automobile Club de France – 1896 Paris–Marseille–Paris.
- 3rd Grand Prix de l'Automobile Club de France – 1898 Paris–Amsterdam–Paris Trail.
- 4th Grand Prix de l'Automobile Club de France – 1899 Tour de France Trail. 16–24 July.
- 5th Grand Prix de l'Automobile Club de France – 1900 Paris-Toulouse-Paris Trail.
- 6th Grand Prix de l'Automobile Club de France – 1901 Paris-Berlin Trail.
- 7th Grand Prix de l'Automobile Club de France – 1902 Paris-Vienna Trail.
- 8th Grand Prix de l'Automobile Club de France – 1903 Paris-Madrid Trail.
- 9th Grand Prix de l'Automobile Club de France – 1906 1st Grand Prix de l'Automobile Club de France (Le Mans).
- 10th Grand Prix de l'Automobile Club de France – 1907 Grand Prix de l'Automobile Club de France (Dieppe).
- 11th Grand Prix de l'Automobile Club de France – 1908 Grand Prix de l'Automobile Club de France (Dieppe).

== See also ==
- History of auto racing
- Auto racing
- Formula One
- List of Formula One Grand Prix winners
