= Giuseppe Pastore =

Italian racing driver (1888–1965)

Giuseppe Pastore was an Italian engineer and racing driver active in the 1920s.

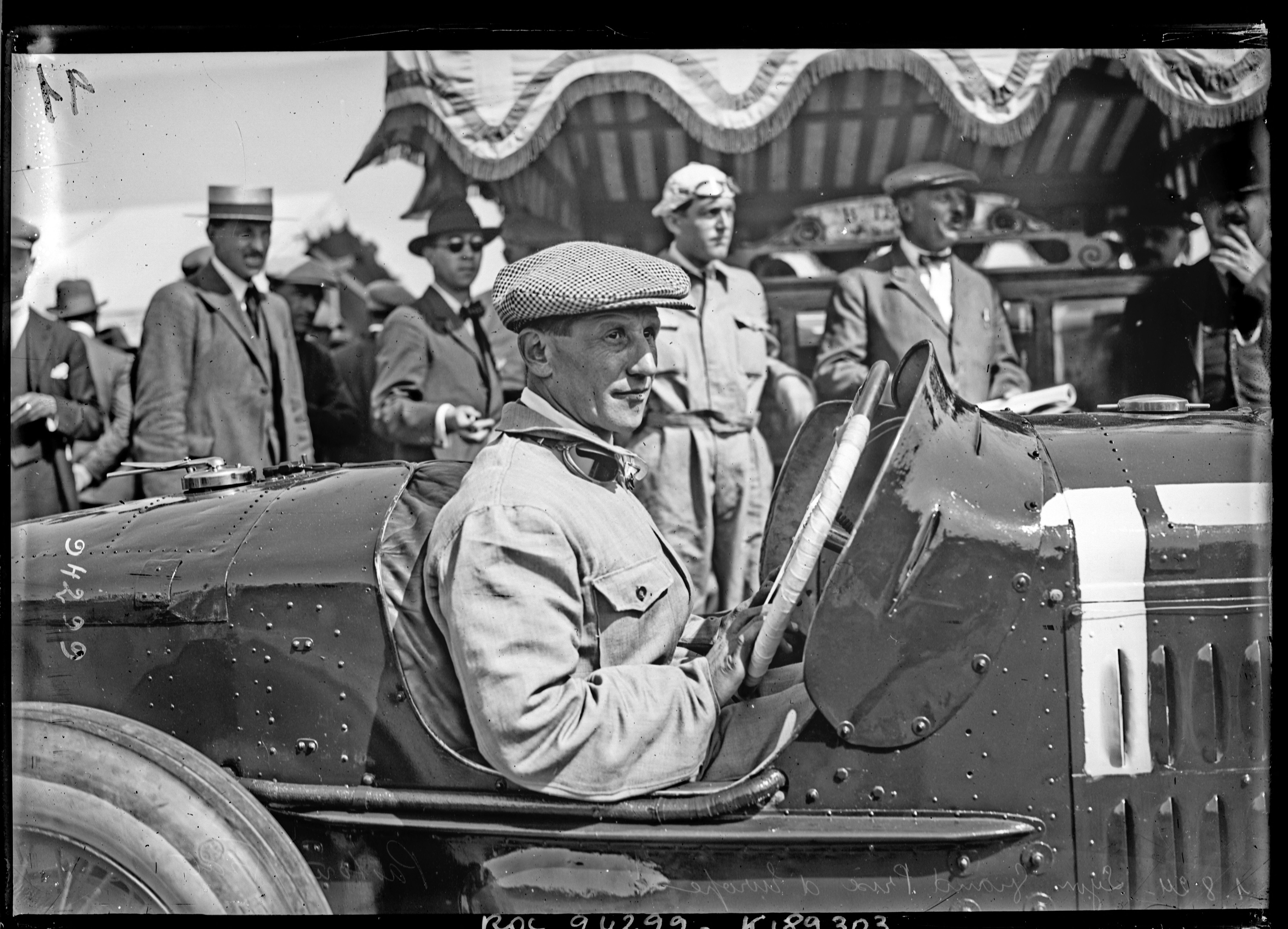
On the weighbridge at the 1924 French Grand Prix

== Career ==
Pastore was an engineer and test driver at Fiat in the 1920s, and had been working on the Fiat 805 Grand Prix car from 1922. In 1924 Pastore was promoted to the race team, being entered for the Targa Florio and French Grand Prix as one of the factory drivers.

Pastore retired after three laps of the Targa; at the Grand Prix, Pastore was originally entered as car number 20, but after lead driver Carlo Salamano was withdrawn due to injury, Pastore was given Salamano's number 17 instead, and Onesimo Marchisio given Pastore's old car. On the 11th lap of the Grand Prix, one of Pastore's tyres punctured, and he (and riding mechanic Manzo) were injured in the resulting crash.

Pastore's only other prominent drive was in a Fiat 509S at the 1927 Circuito di Bologna, in the up to 1,100 cm^{3} class, but he did not finish the race. He later became director of Fiat's Lingotto factory.
