= Valencia circuit =

Valencia circuit can refer to two motor racing venues:

- Circuit Ricardo Tormo, a permanent road course used for Moto GP, WTCC and F1 winter testing.
- Valencia Street Circuit, a street circuit around the city of Valencia, used for the European Grand Prix.
