= List of automobile races in Germany =

This is a list of Grand Prix and other major automobile races in Germany.

- Grand Prix of Germany
- European Grand Prix
- Rallye Deutschland
- 6 Hours of Nürburgring
- Nürburgring 24 Hours
