= 1923 Italian Grand Prix =

Race details
- Date: 9 September 1923
- Official name: III Gran Premio d'Italia; I Grand Prix d'Europe
- Location: Monza, Italy
- Course: Autodromo Nazionale di Monza
- Course length: 10.00 km (6.21 miles)
- Distance: 80 laps, 800 km (496.8 miles)

Pole position
Driver	(Italy) Ferdinando Minoia based on entry number 1	Benz
- Grid positions set by car number

Fastest lap
Driver	(Italy) Pietro Bordino	Fiat
- Time: 3:44.0 160.70 kph

Podium
First	(Italy) Carlo Salamano	Fiat
Second	(Italy) Felice Nazzaro	Fiat
Third	(United States) Jimmy Murphy	Miller

The 1923 Italian Grand Prix was a Grand Prix motor race held at Monza on 9 September 1923.

It was the first race to be designated as the European Grand Prix. Rules required a capacity limit of 2 liter, minimum weight of 650 kg, and 800 km distance, as in the Indy 500. Alfa Romeo suffered a fatal crash in practice and withdrew its other cars.

Only FIAT had superchargers and won 1–2 in a race of attrition. Only one of the American Miller 122 cars could also cover the full distance, taking several minutes more, while the best of the Benz RH came in fourth, and also last to be classified. The three Benz RH Tropfenwagen were down on power, but featured innovations like streamlined tear shape body with the rear mid-engine, rear-wheel-drive layout that took four more decades before beginning to dominate single-seater racing that they have done ever since.

== Classification ==
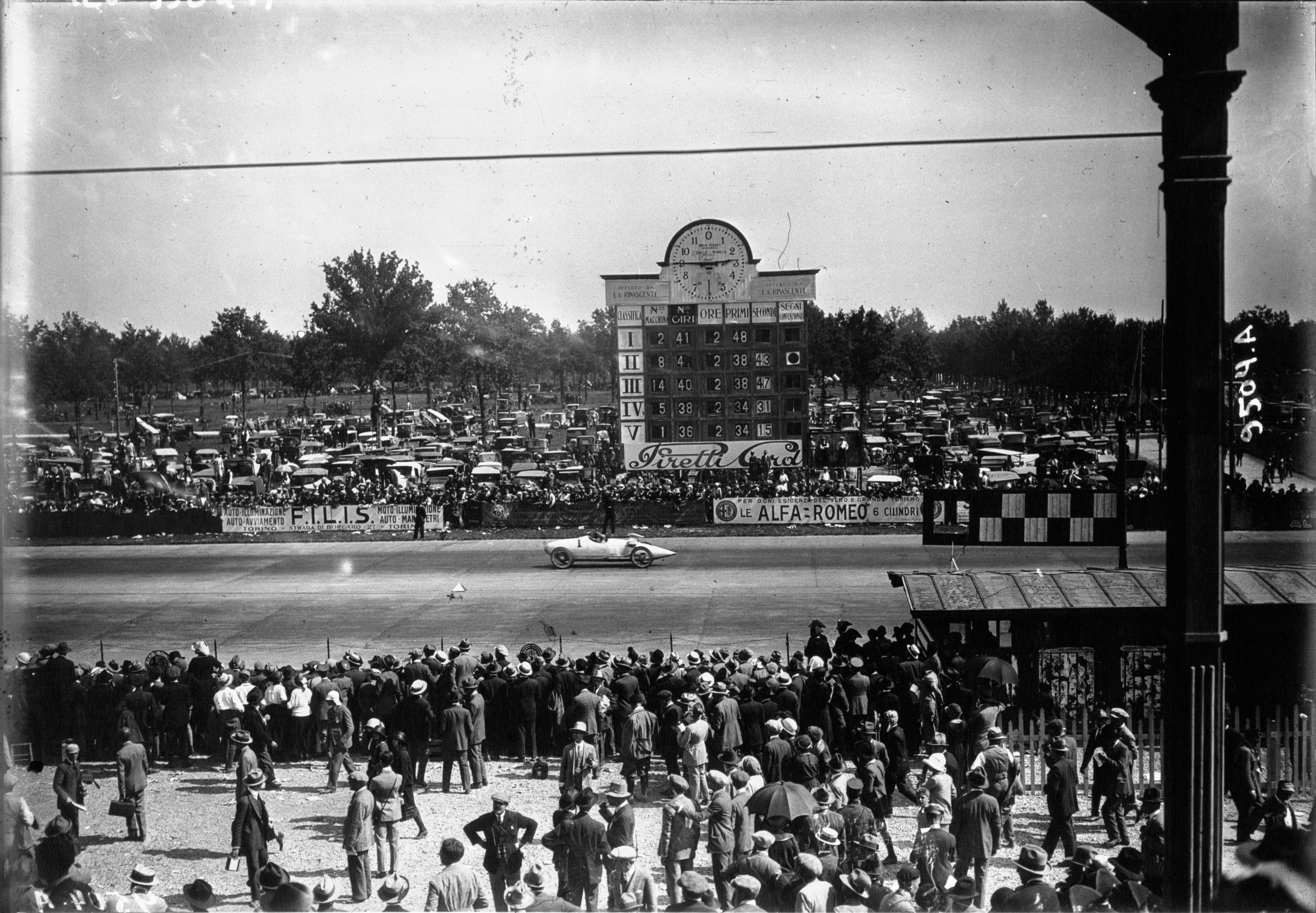
Ferdinando Minoia in his Benz RH Tropfenwagen.

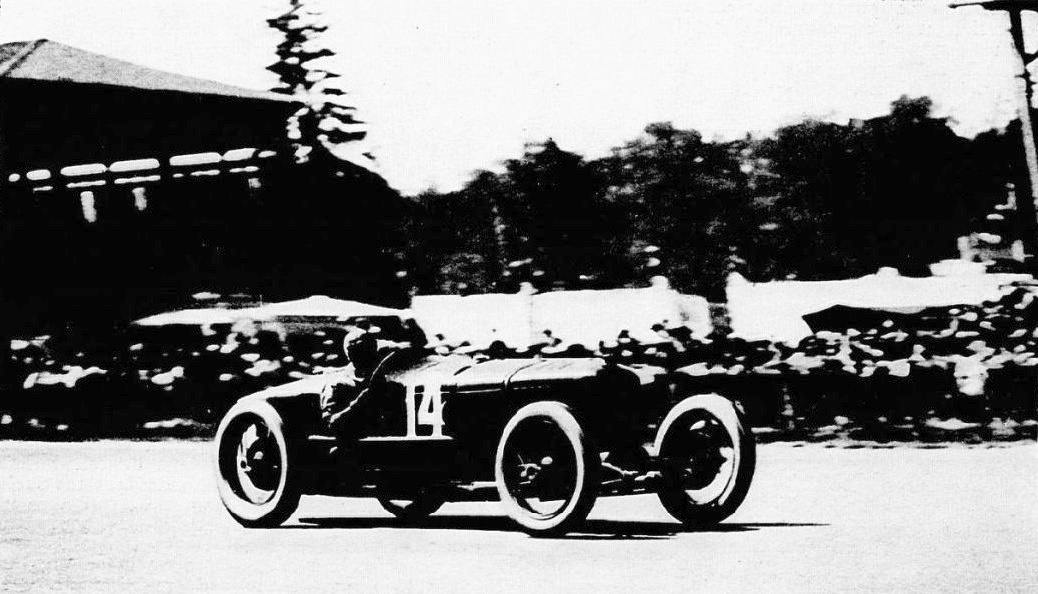
Winner Carlo Salamano in his supercharged Fiat.

Pos	No	Driver	Car	Laps	Time/Retired
1	14	(Italy) Carlo Salamano	Fiat 805-405	80	5h27m38
2	8	(Italy) Felice Nazzaro	Fiat 805-405	80	5h28m02
3	5	(United States) Jimmy Murphy	Miller 122	80	5h32m51
4	1	(Italy) Ferdinando Minoia	Benz RH	76	
NC	7	(Germany) Franz Horner	Benz RH	71	
NC	16	(Argentina) Martín de Álzaga	Miller 122	70	
Ret	4	(France) Albert Guyot	Rolland-Pilain	60	
Ret	2	(Italy) Pietro Bordino	Fiat 805-405	44	Driver exhaustion
Ret	10	(France) Gaston Delalande	Rolland-Pilain	30	
Ret	15	(France) André Lefebvre	Voisin Laboratoire	29	
Ret	13	(Germany) Willy Walb	Benz RH	29	
Ret	9	(France) Henri Rougier	Voisin Laboratoire	28	
Ret	11	(United Kingdom) Louis Zborowski	Miller 122	15	
Ret	3	(Italy) Eugenio Silvani	Voisin Laboratoire	14	Mechanical
DNS	6	(Italy) Antonio Ascari	Alfa Romeo P1		Withdrawn
DNS	12	(Italy) Giuseppe Campari	Alfa Romeo P1		Withdrawn
DNS	17	(Italy) Ugo Sivocci	Alfa Romeo P1		Fatal crash in practice

Grand Prix Race
Previous race: 1923 French Grand Prix	1923 Grand Prix season Grandes Épreuves	Next race: 1924 Indianapolis 500
Previous race: 1922 Italian Grand Prix	Italian Grand Prix	Next race: 1924 Italian Grand Prix
Previous race: None	European Grand Prix (Designated European Grand Prix)	Next race: 1924 French Grand Prix
