= List of automobile races in France =

Grand Prix and other major automobile races in France.

- Grand Prix d'Albi or Grand Prix de l'Albigeois
- Grand Prix de la Baule
- Grand Prix de Bordeaux
- Grand Prix de Cadours
- Grand Prix de Caen
- Grand Prix du Comminges
- Grand Prix de Dieppe
- Grand Prix de France
- Grand Prix de la Marne
- Grand Prix de Marseille
- Grand Prix de Nice
- Pau Grand Prix
- Grand Prix de Picardie
- Grand Prix de Rouen
- 24 Hours of Le Mans
