= Giulio Foresti =

Italian racing driver (1888–1965)

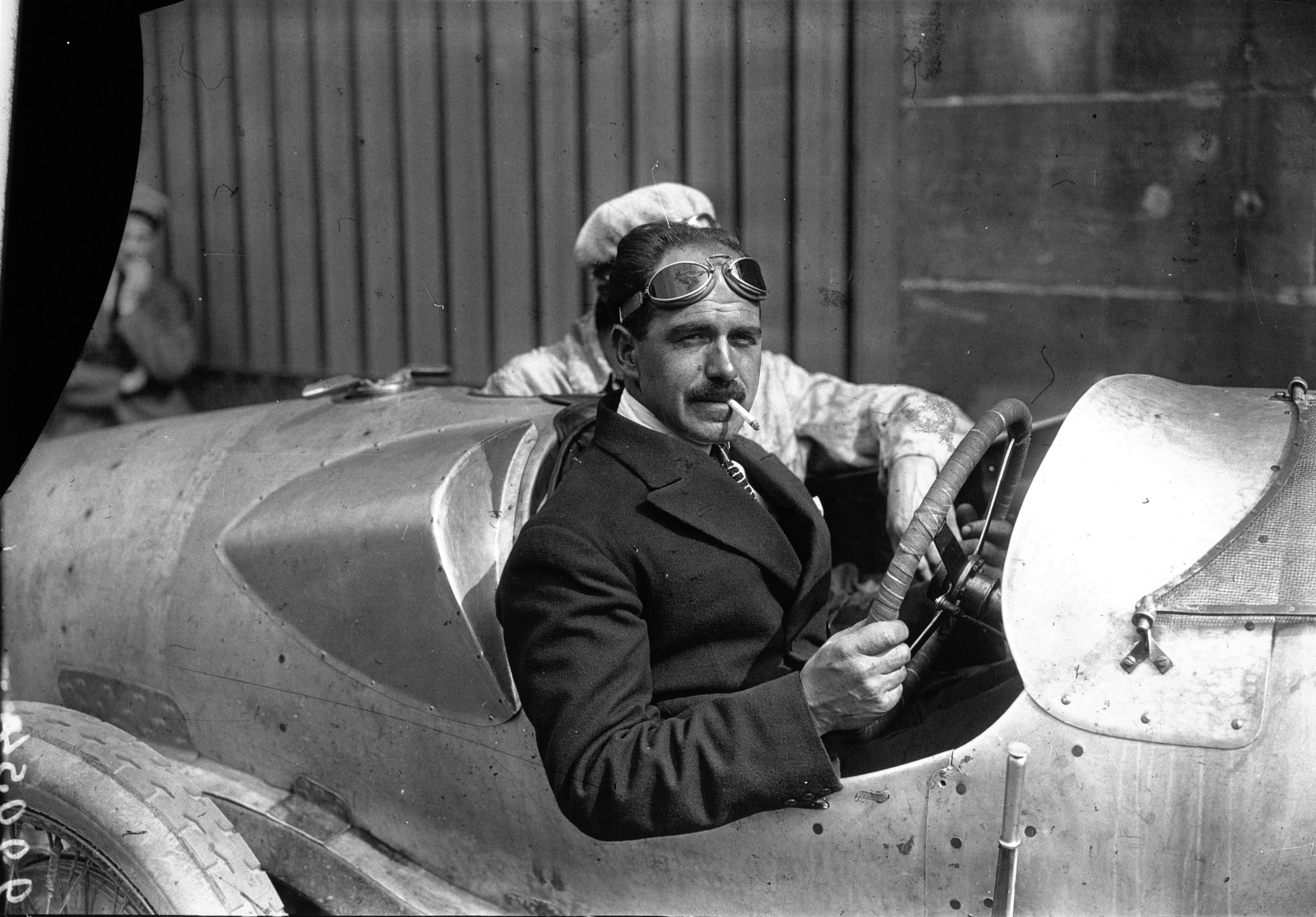
- At the 1922 French Grand Prix
- Born: Giulio Foresti; 31 August 1888 Bergamo, Italy
- Died: 4 March 1965 (aged 76) Bergamo, Italy

Giulio Foresti was an Italian racing driver active between 1911 and 1933. He was the first Italian to take part in the 24 Hours of Le Mans.

== Career ==
Born into a wealthy Bergamese family, Foresti made his racing debut in 1911, driving an Itala Avalve in a rally from Turin to St Petersburg; he sold his car to Tsar Nicholas II at the conclusion of the 1912 event. For the 1913 French Grand Prix he took part as the riding mechanic with Itala's second driver Antonio Moriondo, their race marred by Moriondo overturning on the first lap - the pair, uninjured, righted the car, replaced a broken wheel, and continued until about half-distance.

Retained by Itala as a sales agent in London after the First World War, he won his class in the 1921 Targa Florio, and was hired by Ballot thanks to his test-driving skills. He finished 3rd in the 1922 Targa Florio for the French marque, and made his Grand Prix debut for it at the French Grand Prix that year, retiring near the end with an engine problem.

Foresti drove in other Grands Prix in 1924 for Rolland-Pilain and in 1925 for Bugatti, but he was generally a back-marker, his best result being 6th - and last - in the 1924 Italian Grand Prix, completing the 80 laps two seconds inside the 90 minutes allowed for runners to complete the full distance.

In 1924, he drove in the Le Mans 24 Hour race, the first Italian to do so, in an Ariès with fellow Grand Prix driver Arthur Duray. The duo retired in the second hour. He did however finish fourth overall in the 1926 edition, with Nando Minoia in an OM, winning both the Index of Performance and the Coupe Biennale.

== Land Speed Record attempt ==
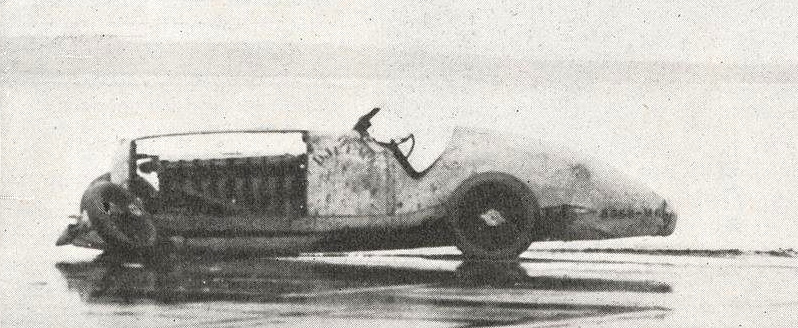
The Djelmo after the accident

In 1924, Foresti was recruited by the Egyptian Prince Djellaledin to drive the Sunbeam-based Djelmo in an attempt to break the Land Speed Record. After setting an unofficial lap record on the Miramas circuit in France that year of just under 160mph, the car was finally considered ready for an attempt on the overall record in 1927, at Pendine Sands in Wales. In November, struggling to break through the 190mph barrier, Foresti crashed, the wet sand in effect cushioning him and preventing serious injury. The car was written off.

== Tragedy at Monza ==
Foresti resumed his Grand Prix career at the 1928 Italian Grand Prix in his own Bugatti Type 35. On lap 17, Maserati driver Emilio Materassi lost control when overtaking Foresti, clipping the rear wheel of the Bugatti, and crashing into the crowd. Materassi and 22 spectators were killed. Foresti continued to finish 8th. It was Foresti's final national Grand Prix; he continued in sportscar racing until the 1933 Mille Miglia. In 2009, the Bergamo Historic Gran Prix introduced the Trofeo Giulio Foresti for 1920s sportscars.
