= 2005 European Grand Prix =

Coordinates: 50°20′08″N 6°56′51″E

Race 7 of 19 in the 2005 Formula One World Championship
← Previous race	Next race →

Race details
- Date: May 29, 2005
- Official name: 2005 Formula 1 Grand Prix of Europe
- Location: Nürburgring, Nürburg, Germany
- Course: Permanent racing facility
- Course length: 5.148 km (3.2 miles)
- Distance: 59 laps, 303.73 km (188.8 miles)
- Scheduled distance: 60 laps, 308.88 km (192 miles)
- Weather: Partly cloudy, hot and dry

Pole position
Driver	(Germany) Nick Heidfeld	Williams-BMW
- Time: 1:30.081

Fastest lap
Driver	(Spain) Fernando Alonso	Renault
- Time: 1:30.711 on lap 44

Podium
First	(Spain) Fernando Alonso	Renault
Second	(Germany) Nick Heidfeld	Williams-BMW
Third	(Brazil) Rubens Barrichello	Ferrari

The 2005 European Grand Prix (officially the 2005 Formula 1 Grand Prix of Europe) was a Formula One motor race held on 29 May 2005 at the Nürburgring in Nürburg, Germany. The 59-lap race was the seventh round of the 2005 FIA Formula One World Championship, the 49th running of the European Grand Prix, and the 15th European Grand Prix as a standalone event (i.e. not an honorific title awarded to an existing event). It was the second of a series of six races held within eight weeks.

The race was won by championship leader Fernando Alonso for the Renault team. McLaren driver Kimi Räikkönen was leading the race at the start of the final lap, but crashed out with a suspension failure caused by a flat-spotted front tyre. Winner Alonso started in sixth position whilst Nick Heidfeld took the first and only pole position of his career for the Williams team. He eventually finished second in front of the Ferrari of Rubens Barrichello, who completed the podium in third position.

== Report ==
=== Background ===
The race saw the return of the BAR-Honda team, who had been suspended for two races following the San Marino Grand Prix, due to a fuel tank irregularity. However, due to the 2005 engine regulations, they had to use engines from the San Marino race, which had been untouched for five weeks. Red Bull Racing decided that Vitantonio Liuzzi would retain his race seat for one round, before Christian Klien would take over for the Canadian Grand Prix and onwards.

=== Friday drivers ===
The bottom 6 teams in the 2004 Constructors' Championship were entitled to run a third car in free practice on Friday. These drivers drove on Friday but did not compete in qualifying or the race.

Constructor	Nat	Driver
McLaren-Mercedes	(Austria)	Alexander Wurz
Sauber-Petronas		-
Red Bull-Cosworth	(Austria)	Christian Klien
Toyota	(Brazil)	Ricardo Zonta
Jordan-Toyota	(France)	Franck Montagny
Minardi-Cosworth		-

=== Qualifying ===
The race marked yet another change in the qualifying system, with the aggregate system being discarded for a single session on Saturday, with cars in full race set-up (including fuel), and running in reverse order to the classification from the previous Grand Prix. This disadvantaged the BAR team significantly, as they were required to be the first two cars on the track. German Williams driver Nick Heidfeld took his only career pole position in front of his home fans, ahead of McLaren's Kimi Räikkönen and Heidfeld's teammate Mark Webber.

=== Race ===
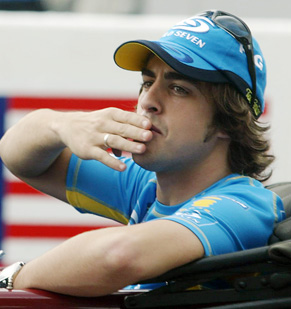
Fernando Alonso won the race and extended his lead in the Drivers' Championship.

With an ambient temperature of 25 °C (77 °F) and a track temperature of 45 °C (113 °F), the cars lined up for the start of the race. However, as the lights turned on to signal the start, Renault's Giancarlo Fisichella signalled that his car had stalled, and the start had to be aborted. As the field set off for another formation lap, Fisichella's car was pushed into the pitlane, and the race distance was reduced by 1 lap to 59. At the start, both Williams' got away from the line slowly, with Heidfeld beaten into the first corner by Räikkönen, and Webber overtaken by both Jarno Trulli and Juan Pablo Montoya before the first turn. Desperate to keep Trulli behind, Webber braked very late for the corner, and locked his front-right brake. Montoya turned in towards the apex of the corner, but made contact with Webber, who was forced to retire with suspension damage. Montoya's car was undamaged, but he lost several places as a result of being forced off line, and finished the first lap in 13th place. Several other cars were forced to take evasive action, with both Ferraris losing a large amount of time, and Ralf Schumacher breaking his front wing as he ran into the back of another car. During the first lap, Takuma Sato also damaged his front wing, and along with Schumacher, was forced to pit at the end of the lap, leaving both cars at the back of the field. Red Bull Racing's David Coulthard managed to avoid the confusion, and was in 4th place at the end of the first lap after starting 12th. Both Jordan drivers made good starts also, sitting in 10th and 11th. Räikkönen pushed away to a 1.9 second lead by the end of lap 1.

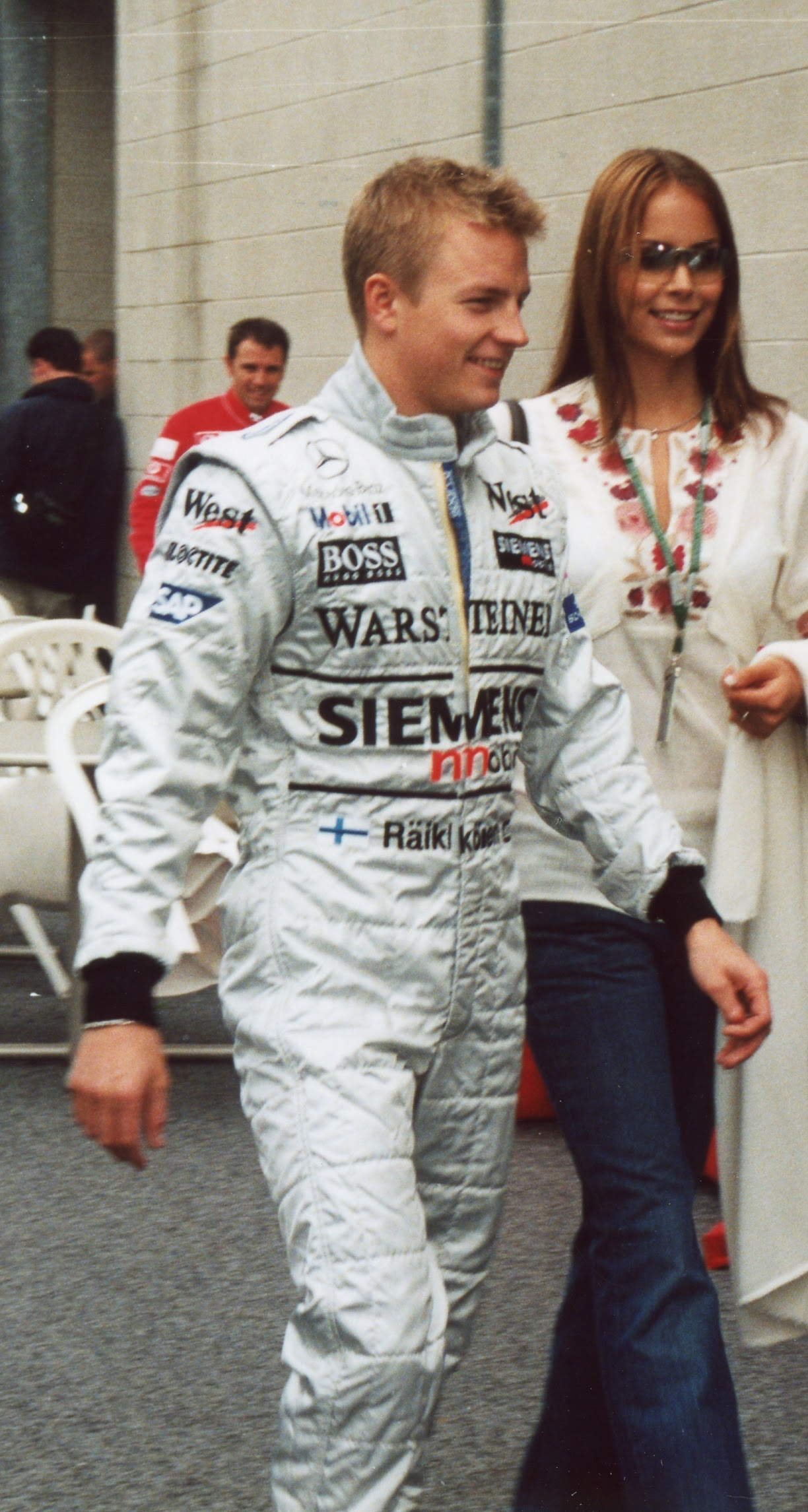
Kimi Räikkönen led the race going into the final lap, but his suspension failed at the first corner due to heavy tyre degradation.

As the Jordans and Minardis were forced back down the field by faster cars, Toyota's Jarno Trulli was handed a drive-through penalty because his mechanics were still on the grid within 15 seconds of the race start. He dropped down from 3rd to 9th upon taking the penalty. On lap 6, Rubens Barrichello had an excellent battle with Jenson Button, taking 8th position after attempting to pass through 3 corners. Button lost a small amount of time as a result of the pass, which was enough for Montoya to close up behind and subsequently take 9th place. Barrichello, on a charge, overtook Vitantonio Liuzzi for 7th place on lap 8, but showed he was on light fuel, being the first driver to take their scheduled stop, which dropped him down to 12th position. On the very next lap, Heidfeld took his first stop, showing that his pole position was helped by having less fuel than several of the front-runners. The rest of the field began their pit stop sequences around lap 18, allowing Montoya to leapfrog Liuzzi for 8th place, while Barrichello put in some quick laps to move into an outright 4th position. David Coulthard, who led the race for 1 lap as the pit stop sequence unfolded, was given a drive-through penalty for exceeding the pitlane speed limit. With all the stops complete, Räikkönen retained a 2-second lead over Heidfeld, followed by Alonso, Barrichello, Coulthard, Felipe Massa, Michael Schumacher and Montoya.

On lap 30, Räikkönen appeared to lose concentration, going wide through the Ford chicane, allowing Heidfeld into the lead for one lap before the German had to pit. As he ran off-road, Räikkönen damaged his bargeboard. The mistake allowed Alonso to gain 4 seconds. Heidfeld rejoined in 3rd after his second pit stop, and Barrichello, also on a 3-stop strategy, retained 4th. A few laps later whilst lapping Jacques Villeneuve, who ignored blue flags, Räikkönen locked his front-right tyre and ran wide, causing a "flat spot" and losing a small amount of time to Alonso. Due to the 2005 regulations, Räikkönen was unable to change the tyre and continue in the race, causing severe problems later in the race. Ralf Schumacher became only the second retirement of the race, losing his car at the Ford chicane, and spinning into the gravel trap. On lap 36, Räikkönen held a 15.2 second lead back to Alonso, who had an 8-second gap back to Heidfeld, followed by Barrichello, Coulthard, Massa, Michael Schumacher and Montoya.

Räikkönen was able to continue posting competitive lap times and retain his lead over Alonso, but had to take his second pit stop on lap 43, handing Alonso the lead and a chance to decrease the gap. Alonso set the fastest lap of the race on lap 44, but then lost around 7 seconds after running off the road at the Dunlop hairpin. All of the front-runners pitted and held their positions, while Fisichella was able to move ahead of Montoya after some good laps. Meanwhile, Massa, in 6th position, ran off the road and lost a large amount of time, also damaging his tyres. With 8 laps remaining, Räikkönen held a 7.4 second lead over Alonso, and had victory in sight, but the tyre damage was causing major vibrations throughout the car and suspension, causing him trouble under braking and through corners. Alonso, with a clearly faster car at that stage, was able to close the gap quickly, and with 2 laps left, he had reduced it to just 2.7 seconds. Räikkönen's tyre began showing signs of imminent failure, and the vibrations in the car became increasingly severe. The McLaren team decided not to change the tyre, instead opting to go for the victory.

As Räikkönen started the final lap of the race, he was 1.5 seconds ahead of Alonso, and there was a chance for Alonso to perhaps catch the Finnish driver. However, under braking for turn 1, Räikkönen's suspension broke under the increasing pressure, sending him spinning narrowly past Jenson Button and into the gravel trap, ending his race. Alonso was able to take the last lap easily, winning the race ahead of Heidfeld and Barrichello. It was Alonso's fourth win for the season, increasing his championship lead to 32 points ahead of Räikkönen and Trulli. The failure on the final lap had denied Räikkönen his third successive victory. Heidfeld's third podium for the year meant he moved into fourth place in the championship standings. David Coulthard picked up a valuable fourth place for Red Bull, followed by Michael Schumacher, Fisichella, Montoya and Trulli. Felipe Massa finished 14th after his front wing failed with four laps remaining, damaging his left-front tyre, forcing him to pit to change both. Trulli and Coulthard were not the only ones to receive penalties, as Tiago Monteiro and Christijan Albers were issued drive-through penalties for ignoring blue flags.

== Classification ==
=== Qualifying ===
Pos	No	Driver	Constructor	Lap	Gap	Grid
1	8	(Germany) Nick Heidfeld	Williams-BMW	1:30.081	—	1
2	9	(Finland) Kimi Räikkönen	McLaren-Mercedes	1:30.197	+0.116	2
3	7	(Australia) Mark Webber	Williams-BMW	1:30.368	+0.287	3
4	16	(Italy) Jarno Trulli	Toyota	1:30.700	+0.619	4
5	10	(Colombia) Juan Pablo Montoya	McLaren-Mercedes	1:30.890	+0.809	5
6	5	(Spain) Fernando Alonso	Renault	1:31.056	+0.975	6
7	2	(Brazil) Rubens Barrichello	Ferrari	1:31.249	+1.168	7
8	17	(Germany) Ralf Schumacher	Toyota	1:31.392	+1.311	8
9	6	(Italy) Giancarlo Fisichella	Renault	1:31.566	+1.485	9
10	1	(Germany) Michael Schumacher	Ferrari	1:31.585	+1.504	10
11	12	(Brazil) Felipe Massa	Sauber-Petronas	1:32.205	+2.124	11
12	14	(United Kingdom) David Coulthard	Red Bull-Cosworth	1:32.553	+2.472	12
13	3	(United Kingdom) Jenson Button	BAR-Honda	1:32.594	+2.513	13
14	15	(Italy) Vitantonio Liuzzi	Red Bull-Cosworth	1:32.642	+2.561	14
15	11	(Canada) Jacques Villeneuve	Sauber-Petronas	1:32.891	+2.810	15
16	4	(Japan) Takuma Sato	BAR-Honda	1:32.926	+2.845	16
17	18	(Portugal) Tiago Monteiro	Jordan-Toyota	1:35.047	+4.966	17
18	20	(Austria) Patrick Friesacher	Minardi-Cosworth	1:35.954	+5.873	18
19	19	(India) Narain Karthikeyan	Jordan-Toyota	1:36.192	+6.111	19
20	21	(Netherlands) Christijan Albers	Minardi-Cosworth	1:36.239	+6.158	20

=== Race ===
Pos	No	Driver	Constructor	Tyre	Laps	Time/Retired	Grid	Points
1	5	(Spain) Fernando Alonso	Renault	MI	59	1:31:46.648	6	10
2	8	(Germany) Nick Heidfeld	Williams-BMW	MI	59	+16.567	1	8
3	2	(Brazil) Rubens Barrichello	Ferrari	B	59	+18.549	7	6
4	14	(United Kingdom) David Coulthard	Red Bull-Cosworth	MI	59	+31.588	12	5
5	1	(Germany) Michael Schumacher	Ferrari	B	59	+50.445	10	4
6	6	(Italy) Giancarlo Fisichella	Renault	MI	59	+51.932	PL	3
7	10	(Colombia) Juan Pablo Montoya	McLaren-Mercedes	MI	59	+58.173	5	2
8	16	(Italy) Jarno Trulli	Toyota	MI	59	+1:11.091	4	1
9	15	(Italy) Vitantonio Liuzzi	Red Bull-Cosworth	MI	59	+1:11.529	14	
10	3	(United Kingdom) Jenson Button	BAR-Honda	MI	59	+1:35.786	13	
11	9	(Finland) Kimi Räikkönen	McLaren-Mercedes	MI	58	Suspension/Accident	2	
12	4	(Japan) Takuma Sato	BAR-Honda	MI	58	+1 Lap	16	
13	11	(Canada) Jacques Villeneuve	Sauber-Petronas	MI	58	+1 Lap	15	
14	12	(Brazil) Felipe Massa	Sauber-Petronas	MI	58	+1 Lap	11	
15	18	(Portugal) Tiago Monteiro	Jordan-Toyota	B	58	+1 Lap	17	
16	19	(India) Narain Karthikeyan	Jordan-Toyota	B	58	+1 Lap	19	
17	21	(Netherlands) Christijan Albers	Minardi-Cosworth	B	57	+2 Laps	20	
18	20	(Austria) Patrick Friesacher	Minardi-Cosworth	B	56	+3 Laps	18	
Ret	17	(Germany) Ralf Schumacher	Toyota	MI	33	Spun off	8	
Ret	7	(Australia) Mark Webber	Williams-BMW	MI	0	Collision	3	
Sources:

- Fisichella started the race from the pitlane.

== Championship standings after the race ==
Drivers' Championship standings

	Pos	Driver	Points
	1	(Spain) Fernando Alonso	59
	2	(Finland) Kimi Räikkönen	27
	3	(Italy) Jarno Trulli	27
1	4	(Germany) Nick Heidfeld	25
1	5	(Australia) Mark Webber	18

Constructors' Championship standings

Pos	Constructor	Points
1	(France) Renault	76
2	(United Kingdom) McLaren-Mercedes	53
3	(Japan) Toyota	44
4	(United Kingdom) Williams-BMW	43
5	(Italy) Ferrari	31

- Note: Only the top five positions are included for both sets of standings.

== See also ==
- 2005 Nürburgring GP2 Series round

Previous race: 2005 Monaco Grand Prix	FIA Formula One World Championship; 2005 season	Next race: 2005 Canadian Grand Prix
Previous race: 2004 European Grand Prix	European Grand Prix	Next race: 2006 European Grand Prix
