= Coppa Fiera di Milano =

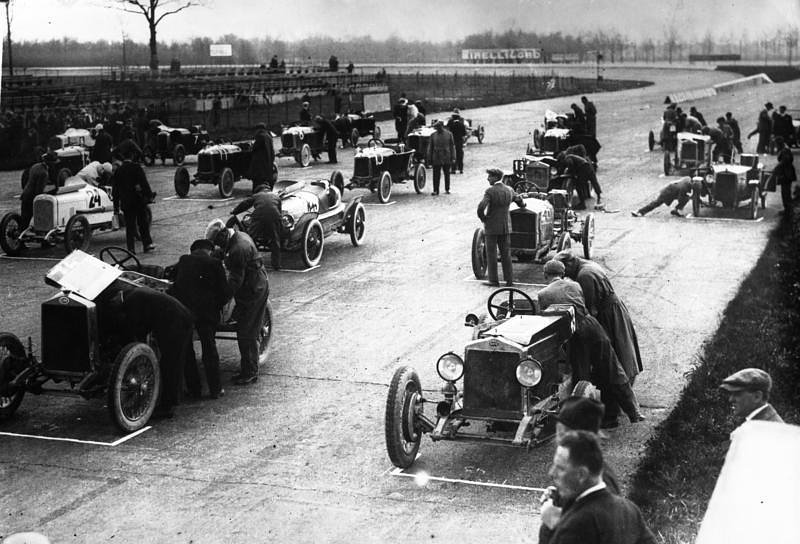
Starting grid for the "Coppa Fiera di Milano". In the foreground are two Diatto cars.

The 1st Coppa Fiera di Milano was an automobile race held in 1925 in the Autodromo di Monza. During the International Milan Trade Fair, held from 12 to 27 April 1925, which included the International Motor Show, an international speed trial, with a fuel limit of 18 litres, was organized on the Monza circuit on Sunday, April 19.

In the spirit of the Milan Trade Fair, the competition was intended to demonstrate the technological level reached by cars, rather than their speed performance. The race was won by a Diatto 30 Sport, with an 8-cylinder 2000cc engine, driven by the Alfieri Maserati.
