= Mozambique Grand Prix =

- Circuito de Lourenço Marques

Race information
- Number of times held: 12
- First held: 1958
- Last held: 1971
- Most wins (drivers): (Rhodesia) John Love (5)
- Most wins (constructors): (United Kingdom) Cooper (3)
- Circuit length: 3.380 km (2.089 miles)

Last race (1971)

Pole position

Podium
- 1. (Rhodesia) John Love; Surtees-Ford

Fastest lap

The Mozambique Grand Prix or Grand Prix de Moçambique, was an open-wheel motor race held in the 1950s and 60s in Lourenço Marques (now Maputo) the capital of the colony of Portuguese Mozambique.

A race was held on a small street circuit in 1950 with the Grand Prix being established some eight years later. The circuit was expanded in 1961 before being replaced by a purpose built facility in 1962.

Competitors were drawn from the South African Formula One Championship, although it was never part of the championship. The more northerly climate and international location to the South African and Rhodesian racers proved a popular combination and the race attracted strong fields. The race was briefly renamed the Governor General Cup in 1966– 1967 before returning to the Grand Prix.

The circuit was redeveloped and moved slightly inland from its beachfront location in 1970. The race was last held in 1971 as the Portuguese Colonial War grew more serious and the circuit closed a year later after the last Three hour sportscar race was held. The new independent Mozambique government banned motor racing and the race track fell into disuse.

== Winners of the Mozambique Grand Prix ==
Results sourced from:

Year	Driver	Constructor	Location	Report
1958	(South Africa) Ian Fraser-Jones	Porsche	Lourenço Marques street circuit	Report
1959–1960	Not held			
1961	(South Africa) Bruce Johnstone	Cooper-Alfa Romeo	Lourenço Marques street circuit	Report
1962	(South Africa) Peter de Klerk	Alfa Romeo Special	Circuito de Lourenço Marques	Report
1963	(South Africa) Peter de Klerk	Alfa Romeo Special	Circuito de Lourenço Marques	Report
1964	(Rhodesia) John Love	Cooper-Climax	Circuito de Lourenço Marques	Report
1965	(Rhodesia) John Love	Cooper-Climax	Circuito de Lourenço Marques	Report
1966	(South Africa) Dave Charlton	Brabham-Climax	Circuito de Lourenço Marques	Report
1967	(Rhodesia) John Love	Brabham-Repco	Circuito de Lourenço Marques	Report
1968	(South Africa) Jackie Pretorius	Lola-Ford	Circuito de Lourenço Marques	Report
1969	(Rhodesia) John Love	Lotus-Ford	Circuito de Lourenço Marques	Report
1970	(South Africa) Dave Charlton	Lotus-Ford	Circuito de Lourenço Marques	Report
1971	(Rhodesia) John Love	Surtees-Ford	Circuito de Lourenço Marques	Report
