= Carlo Salamano =

Italian racing driver (1891–1969)

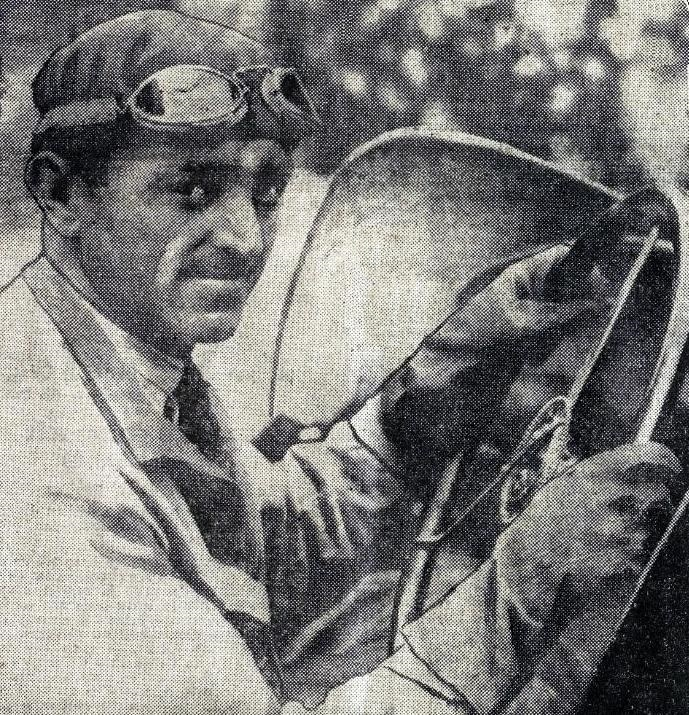
- Salamano at 1923 Italian Grand Prix
- Born: 3 January 1891; Vercelli, Italy
- Died: 19 January 1969 (aged 78); Turin, Italy
- Occupation: Racing driver

Carlo Salamano (3 January 1891 – 19 January 1969) was an Italian racecar driver. A resident of Turin, in 1923 he drove a Fiat 805 to win the Italian Grand Prix at Monza, the event also serving as the inaugural European Grand Prix; it was the first victory by an automobile equipped with a supercharger in a significant European event. While an official championship had yet to be established, he was considered to be the season champion by historians.

Following his retirement from racing competition, Salamano acted as the leader of Fiat's vehicle testing department, being described as the company's "technical conscience". He retired from Fiat in 1962.
