= European Grand Prix =

Formula 1 Grand Prix

Race information
- Number of times held: 23 (Germany) Nürburgring (12) (Spain) Valencia Street Circuit (5) (United Kingdom) Brands Hatch (2) (Spain) Circuito de Jerez (2) (United Kingdom) Donington Park (1) (Azerbaijan) Baku City Circuit (1)
- First held: 1983
- Last held: 2016
- Most wins (drivers): (Germany) Michael Schumacher (6)
- Most wins (constructors): (Italy) Ferrari (7)

Last race (2016)

Pole position
- (Germany) Nico Rosberg; Mercedes; 1:42.758

Podium
- 1. (Germany) Nico Rosberg; Mercedes; 1:32:52.366; 2. (Germany) Sebastian Vettel; Ferrari; +16.696; 3. (Mexico) Sergio Pérez; Force India-Mercedes; +25.241

Fastest lap
- (Germany) Nico Rosberg; Mercedes; 1:46.485

The European Grand Prix (also known as the Grand Prix of Europe) was a Formula One event that was introduced during the mid-1980s and was held every year from 1993 to 2012, except in 1998. During these years, the European Grand Prix was held in a country that hosted its own national Grand Prix at a different point in the same season, at a different circuit (except in 2007). The race returned as a one-off in 2016, being held on a street circuit in Baku, Azerbaijan.

In earlier years, the European Grand Prix was not a race in its own right, but an honorific title given to one of the national Grands Prix in Europe. The first race to be so named was the 1923 Italian Grand Prix, held at Monza, and the last was the 1977 British Grand Prix at Silverstone.

== As an honorific title ==
The European Grand Prix was created as an honorific title by the AIACR, the FIA's predecessor in the organisation of motor racing events. The first race to receive the title was the Italian Grand Prix, in 1923; the French Grand Prix followed in 1924 and the Belgian Grand Prix in 1925. After a hiatus in 1929, the Belgian race received the title in 1930, becoming the last race to do so before World War II.

The title was revived by the FIA after the war, when it was given to the 1947 Belgian Grand Prix. For the next thirty years (except 1953 and 1969–1971), the title was distributed across several countries, including at the prestigious Monaco Grand Prix in 1963. The last race to receive the title was the 1977 British Grand Prix. All post-war honorific European Grands Prix were Formula One races except for the 1952 event, the Belgian Grand Prix, which was run to Formula Two regulations.

The Italian and Belgian Grands Prix both received the title seven times, more than any other race.

== As a standalone round of the World Championship ==
=== Brands Hatch (1983, 1985) ===
The event was initially created as a stop-gap. In 1983, the Formula One schedule originally featured a race near Flushing Meadows in New York City. When the race was cancelled three months before the event, track organisers at Brands Hatch were able to create a European Grand Prix at the track in its place. The success of the event, buoyed by a spirited battle for the World Championship, led to the event returning on the schedule the following year. The European Grand Prix (held on 25 September 1983) was F1's second visit of 1983 to the Brands Hatch circuit as the venue had held the Race of Champions non-championship race on 10 April earlier that same year.

Brands Hatch was unable to host the European Grand Prix in 1984, as it was hosting the British Grand Prix in even numbered years (alternating with Silverstone) so the European GP went to a redesigned and shorter Nürburgring circuit in 1984.

Brands Hatch returned to host the European Grand Prix in 1985. Originally the 1985 European Grand Prix was going to be held in Rome on a street circuit around the EUR but was moved to Brands Hatch.

=== Cancelled race Jarama (1986) ===
There was an attempt to stage the European Grand Prix in 1986 with an early version of the calendar publishing Jarama as the host track but these plans fell through.

=== Donington Park (1993) ===
In 1990, a wealthy Japanese businessman, Tomonori Tsurumaki, built the Nippon Autopolis with the idea of hosting a Formula One race. In 1992, plans were made to have an Asian Grand Prix in 1993 to replace the Mexican Grand Prix on the schedule. However, these plans failed to materialise. Instead, Bernie Ecclestone added a race at Donington Park to the schedule, which brought back the European Grand Prix moniker. The race was the brainchild of Tom Wheatcroft, who had been trying to bring F1 to the track since an abortive attempt to host the British Grand Prix in 1988. The first and so far only Formula One Grand Prix at Donington Park resulted in Ayrton Senna's victory in mixed wet and dry conditions.

=== Jerez (1992 (cancelled), 1994, 1997) ===
The Circuito de Jerez in Jerez de la Frontera in Spain was intended to be host of the European Grand Prix in 1992 but this was cancelled. However, Jerez would eventually host the event two years later as round 14 of 16 in 1994 and the season finale in 1997 where it served as replacement for the cancelled Portuguese Grand Prix after the Estoril Circuit was unable to guarantee the completion of circuit safety renovations in time to host a race. The 1997 Jerez race was the site of the controversial collision between Michael Schumacher and Jacques Villeneuve which saw Schumacher get disqualified from the championship and it was also the scene of Mika Häkkinen's first Formula One victory.

=== Nürburgring GP-Strecke (1984, 1995–1996, 1999–2007) ===
Brands Hatch was unable to host the European Grand Prix in 1984 due to the Kent Circuit being obligated to host the British Grand Prix that year, so the European GP went to a redesigned and shorter Nürburgring circuit in 1984. It was a far cry from the 23 kilometre Nürburgring that most were used to seeing, and was initially unpopular during Formula One's return.

The race returned to Nürburgring in 1995, which was now popular again with drivers. But after complaints that no other countries were to get the race, the Nürburgring race was renamed the Luxembourg Grand Prix. Jerez got the race back in 1997 as a replacement for the Portuguese Grand Prix.

In 1998, the European Grand Prix was dropped from the schedule with Jerez dropping off the schedule and the Nürburgring race retaining the Luxembourg Grand Prix moniker for that year, but returned in 1999 when the race at Nürburgring re-adopted the European Grand Prix name.

The 1999 race saw torrential rain conditions which caused numerous retirements, presenting Johnny Herbert with the opportunity to take Stewart Grand Prix's first and only victory in its final season before being sold to Ford.

The 2005 event saw a dramatic conclusion as Renault's Fernando Alonso took victory after longtime race leader Kimi Räikkönen driving for McLaren crashed out on the final lap suffered a suspension failure caused by excessive vibrations from a flatspotted tyre.

The race continued to be held at the Nürburgring until 2007. On 29 August 2006 it was announced that it had been removed from the F1 calendar for the 2007 season. From then there would only be one GP hosted in Germany each year, alternating between Hockenheimring and Nürburgring. However, what the name of this Grand Prix would be was uncertain for a time; while originally intended to be the German Grand Prix from 2007, the Nürburgring race of 2007 was renamed "Großer Preis von Europa" (European Grand Prix) due to a dispute over the ownership of the title "German Grand Prix". Fernando Alonso won the 2007 event (held in mixed wet-dry conditions) in a McLaren ahead of Felipe Massa driving for Ferrari and the Red Bull of Mark Webber.

=== Valencia Street Circuit (2008–2012) ===
From 2008 to 2012 the European Grand Prix took place in Valencia, Spain. During the 2009 event, Valencia signed a deal for a further 5 races, which put Valencia on the calendar until 2014. Despite this, in March 2012, it was announced that the European Grand Prix was to be discontinued in 2013, with the Spanish Grand Prix planned to alternate between Barcelona and Valencia. However, Barcelona has retained the race since 2013, and the Valencia circuit was removed from the calendar.

=== Baku City Circuit (2016) ===
The European Grand Prix returned to the Formula One World Championship in 2016, being held on the Baku City Circuit in Azerbaijan. Nico Rosberg driving for Mercedes won the race ahead of Sebastian Vettel and Sergio Pérez. The race at Baku was renamed the Azerbaijan Grand Prix for the 2017 season. This means that the European Grand Prix was again discontinued after a one-off in 2016.

== Winners ==
=== By year (honorary designation) ===
A pink background indicates an event which was not part of the Formula One World Championship.

Year	Driver	Constructor	Designated Grand Prix	Location	Report
1923	(Italy) Carlo Salamano	Fiat	(Italy) Italian Grand Prix	Monza Full Circuit	Report
1924	(Italy) Giuseppe Campari	Alfa Romeo	(France) French Grand Prix	Lyon	Report
1925	(Italy) Antonio Ascari	Alfa Romeo	(Belgium) Belgian Grand Prix	Spa-Francorchamps 15 km circuit	Report
1926	(France) Jules Goux	Bugatti	(Spain) San Sebastián Grand Prix	Lasarte	Report
1927	(France) Robert Benoist	Delage	(Italy) Italian Grand Prix	Monza Full Circuit	Report
1928	(Monaco) Louis Chiron	Bugatti	(Italy) Italian Grand Prix	Monza Full Circuit	Report
1929	Not held				
1930	(Monaco) Louis Chiron	Bugatti	(Belgium) Belgian Grand Prix	Spa-Francorchamps 15 km circuit	Report
1931 – 1946	Not held				
1947	(France) Jean-Pierre Wimille	Alfa Romeo	(Belgium) Belgian Grand Prix	Spa-Francorchamps 14 km circuit	Report
1948	(Italy) Carlo Felice Trossi	Alfa Romeo	(Switzerland) Swiss Grand Prix	Bremgarten	Report
1949	(Italy) Alberto Ascari	Ferrari	(Italy) Italian Grand Prix	Monza	Report
1950	(Italy) Giuseppe Farina	Alfa Romeo	(United Kingdom) British Grand Prix	Silverstone	Report
1951	(Italy) Luigi Fagioli (Argentina) Juan Manuel Fangio	Alfa Romeo	(France) French Grand Prix	Reims-Gueux	Report
1952	(Italy) Alberto Ascari	Ferrari	(Belgium) Belgian Grand Prix	Spa-Francorchamps 14 km circuit	Report
1953	Not held				
1954	(Argentina) Juan Manuel Fangio	Mercedes	(West Germany) German Grand Prix	Nürburgring Nordschleife	Report
1955	(France) Maurice Trintignant	Ferrari	Monaco Grand Prix	Monaco	Report
1956	(United Kingdom) Stirling Moss	Maserati	(Italy) Italian Grand Prix	Monza Full Circuit	Report
1957	(United Kingdom) Tony Brooks (United Kingdom) Stirling Moss	Vanwall	(United Kingdom) British Grand Prix	Aintree	Report
1958	(United Kingdom) Tony Brooks	Vanwall	(Belgium) Belgian Grand Prix	Spa-Francorchamps 14 km circuit	Report
1959	(United Kingdom) Tony Brooks	Ferrari	(France) French Grand Prix	Reims-Gueux	Report
1960	(United States) Phil Hill	Ferrari	(Italy) Italian Grand Prix	Monza Full Circuit	Report
1961	(United Kingdom) Stirling Moss	Lotus-Climax	(West Germany) German Grand Prix	Nürburgring Nordschleife	Report
1962	(United Kingdom) Graham Hill	BRM	(Netherlands) Dutch Grand Prix	Zandvoort	Report
1963	(United Kingdom) Graham Hill	BRM	Monaco Grand Prix	Monaco	Report
1964	(United Kingdom) Jim Clark	Lotus-Climax	(United Kingdom) British Grand Prix	Brands Hatch	Report
1965	(United Kingdom) Jim Clark	Lotus-Climax	(Belgium) Belgian Grand Prix	Spa-Francorchamps 14 km circuit	Report
1966	(Australia) Jack Brabham	Brabham-Repco	(France) French Grand Prix	Reims-Gueux	Report
1967	(United Kingdom) John Surtees	Honda	(Italy) Italian Grand Prix	Monza	Report
1968	(United Kingdom) Jackie Stewart	Matra-Ford	(West Germany) German Grand Prix	Nürburgring Nordschleife	Report
1969 – 1971	Not held				
1972	(Brazil) Emerson Fittipaldi	Lotus-Ford	(United Kingdom) British Grand Prix	Brands Hatch	Report
1973	(United Kingdom) Jackie Stewart	Tyrrell-Ford	(Belgium) Belgian Grand Prix	Zolder	Report
1974	(Switzerland) Clay Regazzoni	Ferrari	(West Germany) German Grand Prix	Nürburgring Nordschleife	Report
1975	(Italy) Vittorio Brambilla	March-Ford	(Austria) Austrian Grand Prix	Österreichring	Report
1976	(United Kingdom) James Hunt	McLaren-Ford	(Netherlands) Dutch Grand Prix	Zandvoort	Report
1977	(United Kingdom) James Hunt	McLaren-Ford	(United Kingdom) British Grand Prix	Silverstone	Report

=== By year (standalone event) ===
Baku City Circuit, used in 2016

Valencia Street Circuit, used from 2008 to 2012

Nürburgring GP-Strecke, used in 1984, 1995, 1996 and from 1999 to 2007

Jerez, used in 1994 and 1997

Donington, used in 1993

Brands Hatch, used in 1983 and 1985

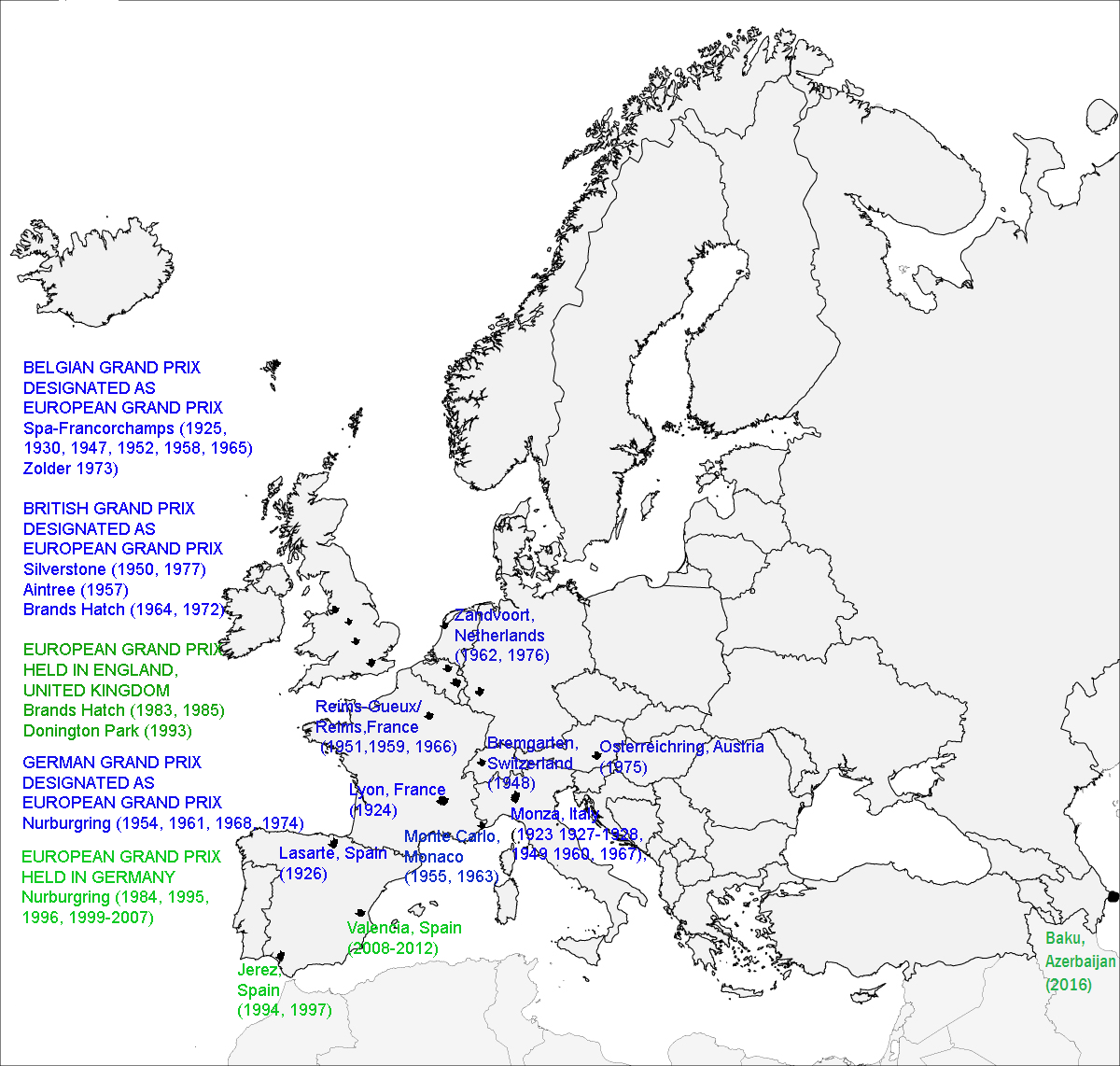
A map of all the locations of the European Grand Prix and other Grands Prix designated as the European Grand Prix

Year	Driver	Constructor	Location	Report
1983	(Brazil) Nelson Piquet	Brabham-BMW	(United Kingdom) Brands Hatch	Report
1984	(France) Alain Prost	McLaren-TAG	(Germany) Nürburgring GP-Strecke	Report
1985	(United Kingdom) Nigel Mansell	Williams-Honda	(United Kingdom) Brands Hatch	Report
1986 – 1992	Not held			
1993	(Brazil) Ayrton Senna	McLaren-Ford	(United Kingdom) Donington	Report
1994	(Germany) Michael Schumacher	Benetton-Ford	(Spain) Jerez	Report
1995	(Germany) Michael Schumacher	Benetton-Renault	(Germany) Nürburgring GP-Strecke	Report
1996	(Canada) Jacques Villeneuve	Williams-Renault	(Germany) Nürburgring GP-Strecke	Report
1997	(Finland) Mika Häkkinen	McLaren-Mercedes	(Spain) Jerez	Report
1998	Not held			
1999	(United Kingdom) Johnny Herbert	Stewart-Ford	(Germany) Nürburgring GP-Strecke	Report
2000	(Germany) Michael Schumacher	Ferrari	(Germany) Nürburgring GP-Strecke	Report
2001	(Germany) Michael Schumacher	Ferrari	(Germany) Nürburgring GP-Strecke	Report
2002	(Brazil) Rubens Barrichello	Ferrari	(Germany) Nürburgring GP-Strecke	Report
2003	(Germany) Ralf Schumacher	Williams-BMW	(Germany) Nürburgring GP-Strecke	Report
2004	(Germany) Michael Schumacher	Ferrari	(Germany) Nürburgring GP-Strecke	Report
2005	(Spain) Fernando Alonso	Renault	(Germany) Nürburgring GP-Strecke	Report
2006	(Germany) Michael Schumacher	Ferrari	(Germany) Nürburgring GP-Strecke	Report
2007	(Spain) Fernando Alonso	McLaren-Mercedes	(Germany) Nürburgring GP-Strecke	Report
2008	(Brazil) Felipe Massa	Ferrari	(Spain) Valencia	Report
2009	(Brazil) Rubens Barrichello	Brawn-Mercedes	(Spain) Valencia	Report
2010	(Germany) Sebastian Vettel	Red Bull-Renault	(Spain) Valencia	Report
2011	(Germany) Sebastian Vettel	Red Bull-Renault	(Spain) Valencia	Report
2012	(Spain) Fernando Alonso	Ferrari	(Spain) Valencia	Report
2013 – 2015	Not held			
2016	(Germany) Nico Rosberg	Mercedes	(Azerbaijan) Baku	Report

=== Repeat winners (drivers) ===
Only includes standalone events.

Drivers in bold are competing in the Formula One championship in 2026.

Wins	Driver	Years won
6	(Germany) Michael Schumacher	1994, 1995, 2000, 2001, 2004, 2006
3	**(Spain) Fernando Alonso**	2005, 2007, 2012
2	(Brazil) Rubens Barrichello	2002, 2009
2	(Germany) Sebastian Vettel	2010, 2011

=== Repeat winners (constructors) ===
Only includes standalone events.

Teams in bold are competing in the Formula One championship in 2026.

Wins	Constructor	Years won
7	**(Italy) Ferrari**	2000, 2001, 2002, 2004, 2006, 2008, 2012
4	**(United Kingdom) McLaren**	1984, 1993, 1997, 2007
3	**(United Kingdom) Williams**	1985, 1996, 2003
2	(United Kingdom) Benetton	1994, 1995
2	**(Austria) Red Bull**	2010, 2011

=== Repeat winners (engine manufacturers) ===
Only includes standalone events.

Manufacturers in bold are competing in the Formula One championship in 2026.

Wins	Manufacturer	Years won
7	**(Italy) Ferrari**	2000, 2001, 2002, 2004, 2006, 2008, 2012
5	(France) Renault	1995, 1996, 2005, 2010, 2011
4	**(Germany) Mercedes ***	1997, 2007, 2009, 2016
3	(United States) Ford **	1993, 1994, 1999
2	(Germany) BMW	1983, 2003

* Built by Ilmor in 1997

** Built by Cosworth
