= Fiat 805 =

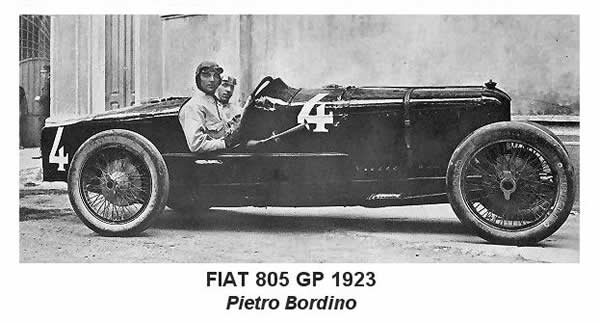
- Pietro Bordino at the wheel of a Fiat 805 in 1923

Overview
- Manufacturer: Fiat
- Production: 1923

Body and chassis
- Body style: Open wheeler
- Layout: front-engine, front-wheel-drive

Powertrain
- Engine: Tipo 405, Inline-8, supercharged
- Transmission: 4-speed manual

Dimensions
- Wheelbase: 2,620 mm (103.1 in)
- Length: 4,330 mm (170.5 in)
- Width: 1,720 mm (67.7 in)
- Height: 1,270 mm (50.0 in)
- Kerb weight: 680 kg (1,499 lb)

Chronology
- Predecessor: Fiat 804
- Successor: Fiat 806-504

The Fiat 805-405 is a racing car from 1923, developed by the Italian automobile manufacturer Fiat. It was the first Grand Prix car to feature an engine with supercharger.

== History ==
The Fiat 805 was externally much like its direct predecessor, the Fiat 804 of 1922. Mechanically it was, however, a pioneering vehicle, being the first Grand Prix car to use a supercharger to increase its engine's output. The noteworthy improvement in engine performance that Fiat achieved could soon also be found in some competing cars, e.g. the Bugatti Type 35 and the Alfa Romeo P2 (the latter shared many mechanical parts with the Fiat), so its initial advantage was soon caught up.

The Fiat 805 had a 1,979 cc engine with 8 cylinders in line (Tipo 405), which produced 130 hp (97 kW) with a centrifugal Witting compressor and later 150 hp (110 kW) with a Roots blower. It weighed 680 kg (1,500 lb) and could reach a top speed of about 220 km/h (140 mph). The two seats were not exactly in line, and also the coachwork behind the seats was asymmetrical. The wheels were by Rudge-Whitworth, the brakes had a servo.

Famous drivers of the 1920s, such as Pietro Bordino and Carlo Salamano, used this vehicle. Although much to the dismay of Giovanni Agnelli, Fiat would abandon the world of racing in 1927, due to the frequent fatal accidents that claimed the lives of numerous drivers.

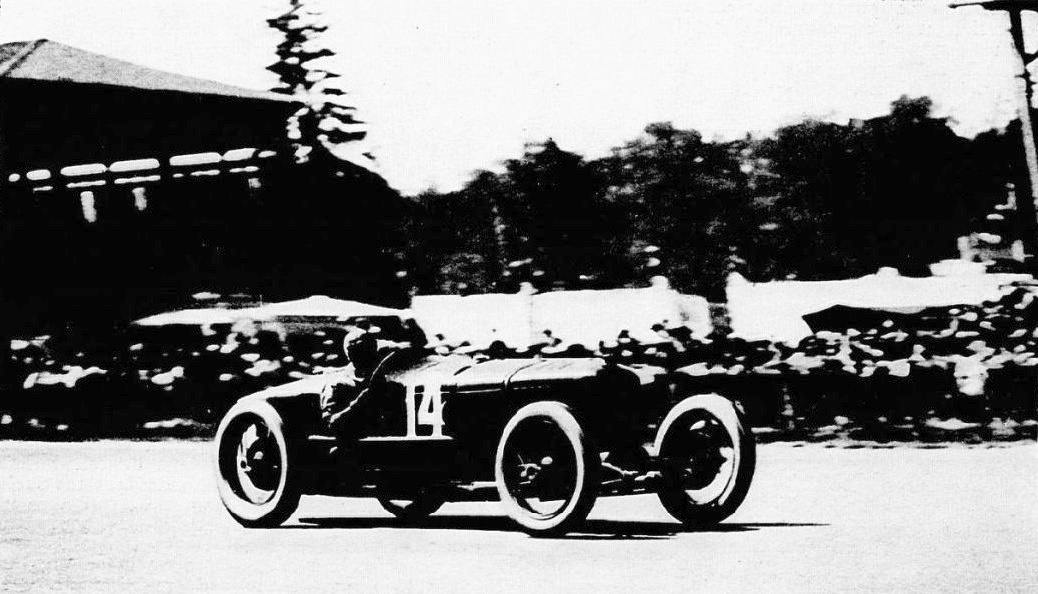
Carlo Salamano, winning the 1923 Grand Prix of Europe in the Fiat 805
