= 1923 Grand Prix season =

Grand Prix season

Seasons
- ← 1922 1924 →

The 1923 Grand Prix season was part of a watershed year for motor racing that saw significant advances in motor-racing engineering, design and events. Fiat's chief designer, Guido Fornaca, developed the 805, the first supercharged car to win a Grand Prix. Benz appeared with the first mid-engined racer and, along with Bugatti and Voisin, produced some of the first efforts at aerodynamics on racing cars. With the United States also adopting the 2-litre formula, Harry Miller could use the smaller engine size to design the first single-seater race-car, ideally suited to American oval racing.

The inaugural Spanish Grand Prix for racing cars was held at a newly built oval at Sitges, near Barcelona. The first 24 Hours of Le Mans was held in June. The iconic race would influence the separation between grand prix and sports car racing and become a test-bed for production car development. The Belgian Automobile Club would promptly copy the format for its own 24-hour event at the new circuit at Spa-Francorchamps.

Alfa Romeo got a 1-2 result at the Targa Florio with Ugo Sivocci winning after Antonio Ascari's car stuttered almost within sight of the finish line. In the 500-mile race at Indianapolis, the new 2-litre Millers made up nearly half the field. Bugatti and Mercedes arrived from Europe, the latter being the first supercharged cars to race in the event. However, in a dominant display Howdy Wilcox and then Tommy Milton led most of the way in their HCS-Millers. Milton went on to become the first two-time winner of the event.

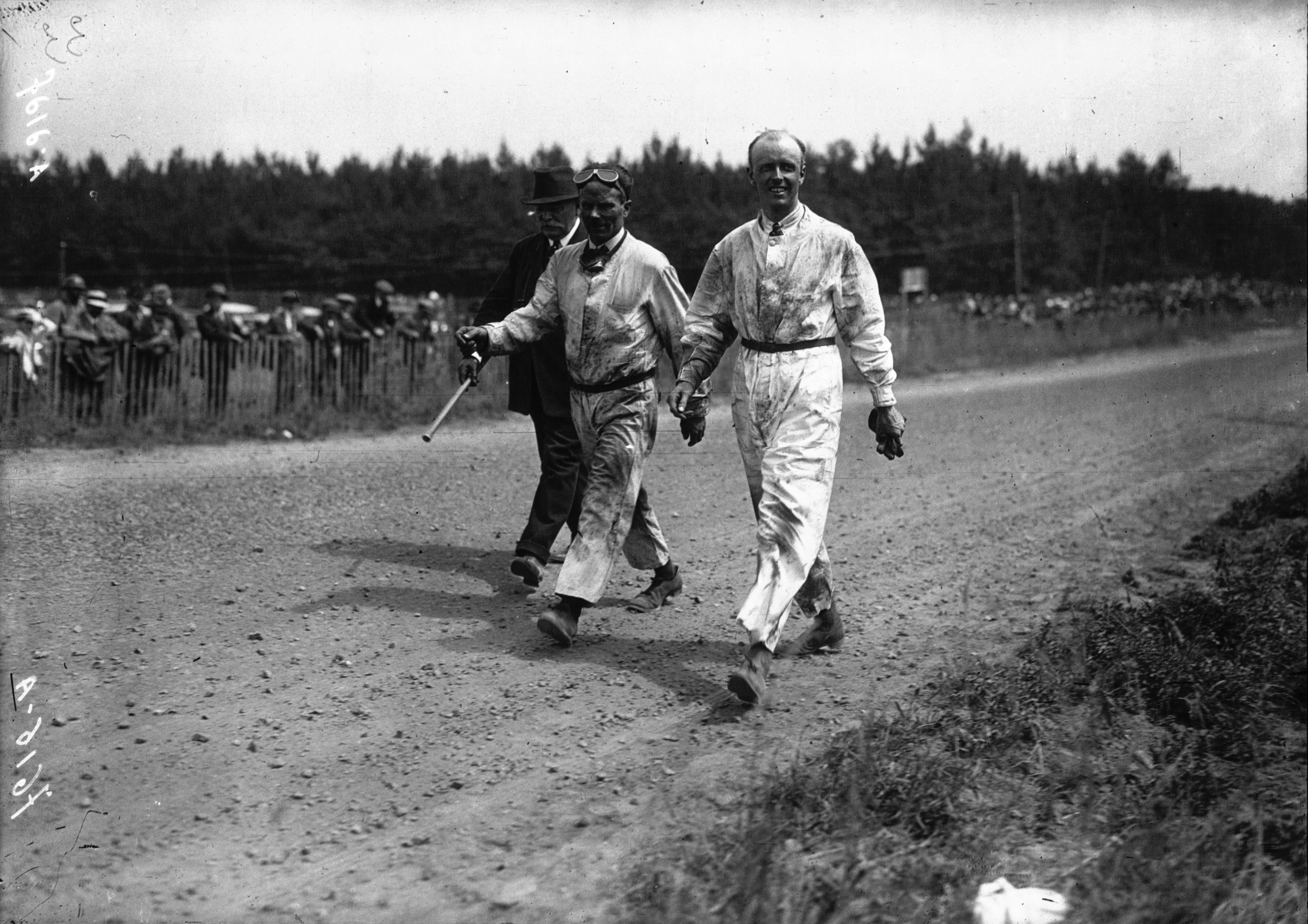
Henry Segrave and his mechanic, winners of the French Grand Prix

A strong line-up arrived for this year's French Grand Prix with most of the new models represented. Though extremely fast, the Fiats suffered on the stony roads of the Tours course and the superchargers ingested too much dust, wrecking the engines. This left Sunbeam, with a design closely resembling the previous year's Fiat, to take the victory. Henry Segrave became the first Briton, and Sunbeam the first British manufacturer, to win a Grand Prix.

The Italian Grand Prix at Autodromo Nazionale Monza was preceded by tragedy. Enrico Giaccone and Ugo Sivocci were both killed in separate practice accidents. Alfa Romeo withdrew its team. Fiat had fitted a new supercharger to their cars and on the paved Monza track would be unbeatable. Many of the teams thought that and therefore stayed away, however Benz and Miller did arrive. In the race Bordino set the early pace despite driving with a broken arm until he had to retire from exhaustion. Salamano took over the lead and held on to take a comfortable victory from teammate Nazzaro with Jimmy Murphy's Miller in third.

In voiturette racing, the undefeated Talbot 56 of 1922 was replaced by the Talbot 70 which was just as dominant. The Sunbeam-Talbot team drivers won every event they entered: Segrave won the first race at Boulogne, while Albert Divo won the Coupe des Voiturettes in France and at Penya Rhin. To close the year off, Dario Resta won at Sitges. The veteran Alessandro Cagno, winner of the first Targa Florio in 1906, won the Gran Premio della Vetturette at Monza in his last victory in a career spanning the history of motor-racing to date.

== Major races ==
Date	Name	Circuit	Race Regulations	Race Distance	Winner's Time	Winning driver	Winning constructor	Report
15 Apr	(Italy) XIV Targa Florio	Medio Madonie	Targa Florio	430 km	7h 18m	(Italy) Ugo Sivocci	Alfa Romeo RL TF	Report
6 May	(Italy) I Circuito di Cremona	Cremona	Formula Libre	190 km	1h 24m	(Italy) Antonio Ascari	Alfa Romeo RL TF	Report
30 May	(United States) XI International 500 Mile Sweepstakes	Indianapolis	AAA	500 miles	5h 30m	(United States) Tommy Milton	HCS-Miller Special	Report
10 Jun	(Italy) IV Circuito di Mugello	Mugello	Formula Libre	390 km	5h 49m	(Italy) Gastone Brilli-Peri	Steyr VI Klausen	Report
17 Jun	(Italy) I Circuito di Savio	Ravenna	Formula Libre	270 km	5h 49m	(Italy) Enzo Ferrari	Alfa Romeo RL TF	Report
29 Jun	(Italy) III Gran Premio della Vetturette	Montichiari	Voiturette	520 km	4h 02m	(Italy) Alessandro Cagno	Fiat 803	Report
2 Jul	(France) XVII French Grand Prix	Tours	AIACR	800 km	6h 35m	(United Kingdom) Henry Segrave	Sunbeam	Report
27 Jul	(Spain) I Gran Premio de San Sebastián	Lasarte	AIACR	450 km	4h 45m	(France) Albert Guyot	Rolland-Pilain A22	Report
28 Jul	(Spain) Gran Premio de San Sebastián 2000cc	Lasarte	Voiturette	590 km	6h 54m	(France) ? Jean de l'Espée	Bugatti Type 22	Report
26 Aug	(Italy) III Coppa Montenero	Montenero	Formula Libre	180 km	2h 42m	(Italy) Mario Razzauti	Ansaldo 2000	Report
1 Sep	(France) III Grand Prix de Boulogne	Boulogne-sur-Mer	Voiturette; Cyclecar	450 km	4h 09m	(United Kingdom) Henry Segrave	Talbot-Darracq 70	Report
9 Sep	(Italy) III Italian Grand Prix; I European Grand Prix	Monza	AIACR	800 km	5h 28m	(Italy) Carlo Salamano	Fiat 805/405	Report
23 Sep	(France) XI Coupe des Voiturettes	Le Mans	Voiturette	415 km	3h 36m	(France) Albert Divo	Talbot-Darracq 70	Report
13 Oct	(United Kingdom) III Junior Car Club 200	Brooklands	Voiturette	200 miles	2h 09m	(United Kingdom) Maj Maurice Harvey	Alvis 12/50	Report
21 Oct	(Spain) III Gran Premi Penya Rhin	Villafranca	Voiturette	520 km	4h 46m	(France) Albert Divo	Talbot-Darracq 70	Report
28 Oct	(Spain) I Gran Premio de España	Sitges	AIACR	400 km	2h 34m	(France) Albert Divo	Sunbeam	Report
4 Nov	(Spain) I Gran Premio de España para Voiturettes	Sitges	Voiturette	600 km	4h 22m	(United Kingdom) Dario Resta	Talbot-Darracq 70	Report
25 Nov	(Italy) III Circuito del Garda	Salò	Formula Libre	250 km	3h 21m	(Italy) Guido Meregalli	Diatto Tipo 20 S	Report

== Regulations and technical ==
The regulations set up by the AIACR (forerunner of the FIA) in 1922 for Grand Prix races remained. The maximum engine limit was 2.0-litres and the minimum weight 650 kg. The cars were 2-seaters and the weight of the driver and mechanic had to be at least 120 kg. The pre-war ban on forced induction had not been re-applied when racing resumed and several manufacturers were now working on the loophole for more power. Not for the last time in Grand Prix racing would technical innovation outmanoeuvre technical regulation.

In the United States Carl G. Fisher, the driving force behind the Indianapolis 500, announced his intention to retire. Before he left, however, he pressured the American Automobile Association (AAA) to change their regulations to align with the European formula. The 183 cu in (3-litre) engine limit was therefore reduced to 122 cu in (2-litre) with a view of attracting European competition to keep the 500 race's future secure and to stop forestall a technology gap. In recognition of this, the Indianapolis 500 was also designated a Grand Épreuve by the AIACR. The AAA also removed the requirement to carry a riding mechanic while racing.

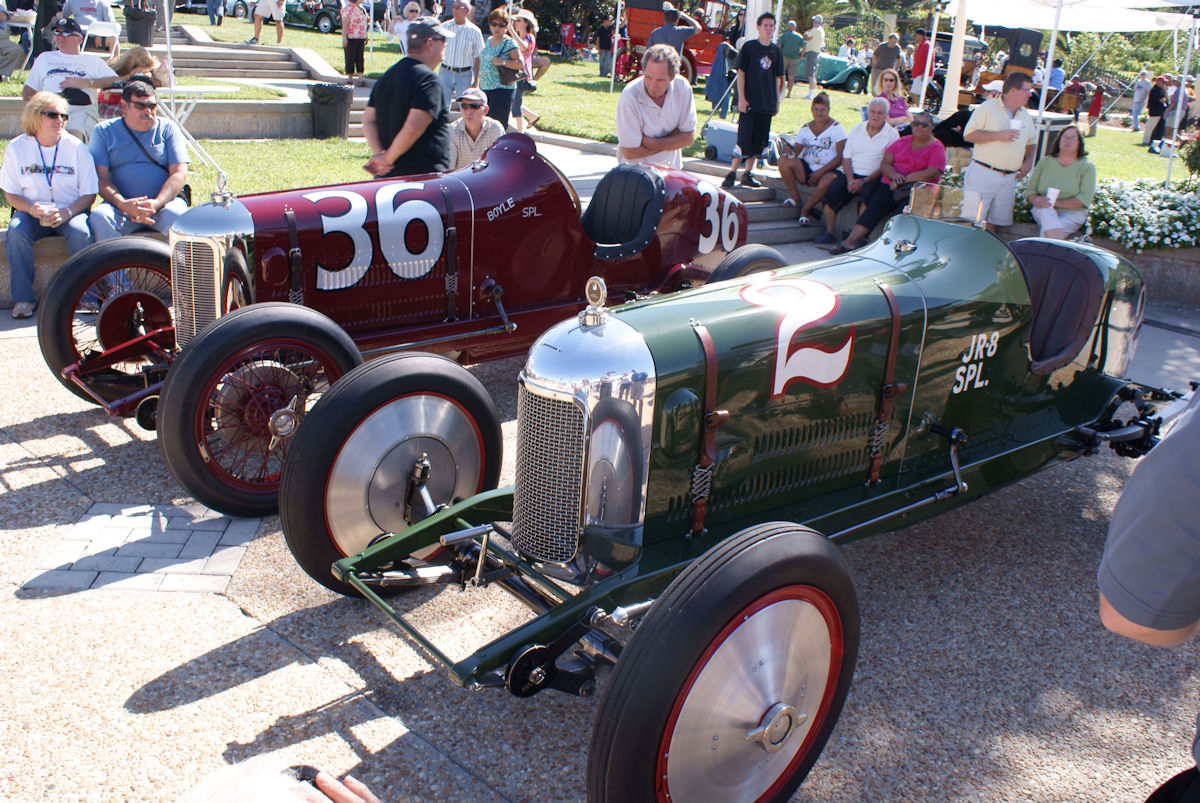
Miller 122: 1922 (left) & 1923 (right) versions

Forced to develop new engines, the leading companies took different strategies. The Frontenac name disappeared: Louis Chevrolet was already under financial pressure and was soon driven under. Fred Duesenberg designed his first double-overhead cam engine. Harry Miller saw an opportunity with the smaller engine and passenger restrictions lifted to build a lightweight single-seater that was a pencil-thin racer tailor-made for the high-speed boardwalk ovals.

In contrast, the Targa Florio regulations remained open to any-sized cars. However the distinction between Production and Racing cars was removed with just the six classes based on engine-capacity.

Following the success to Fiat the previous year, both Alfa Romeo and Sunbeam developed 6-cylinder engines. The non-competitiveness of the last Sunbeam was the end of an illustrious career for designer Ernest Henry. He was replaced by Vincenzo Bertarione from Fiat. His first design bore a strong resemblance to the 1922 Fiat and the contemporary press named it the “English Fiat”.

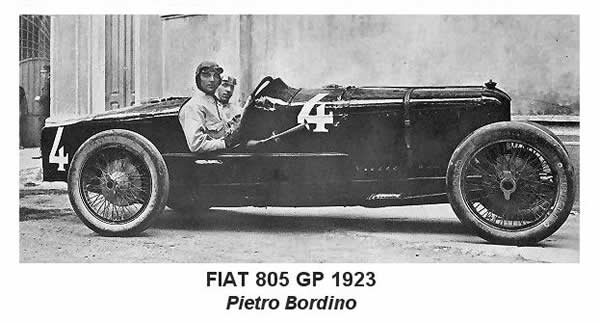
Pietro Bordino in his Fiat 805-405

Fiat, however, had already moved on. The design team of Guido Fornaca introduced the new 805 model. Now with an 8-cylinder 2-litre engine augmented by a Wittig supercharger that gave it 130 bhp, capable of up to 220 km/h – easily 30–40 km/h faster than the competition. Unlike the Mercedes version, the Fiat supercharger ran continually.

The Bugatti Type 32 was a remarkable design departure from the previous Bugatti cars. Its distinctive aerodynamic shape was modelled on an aeroplane wing, earning it the nickname le tank de tours. The car's very short wheelbase and long 8-cylinder engine meant a regular gearbox could not be fitted so Bugatti used a 3-speed unit. An innovative front brake system left the driver with no brake pedal and had to use an on-board lever. Finally, with no firewall between the engine and the crew, meant it was very cramped, hot and exhausting with the drivers complaining of poor visibility.

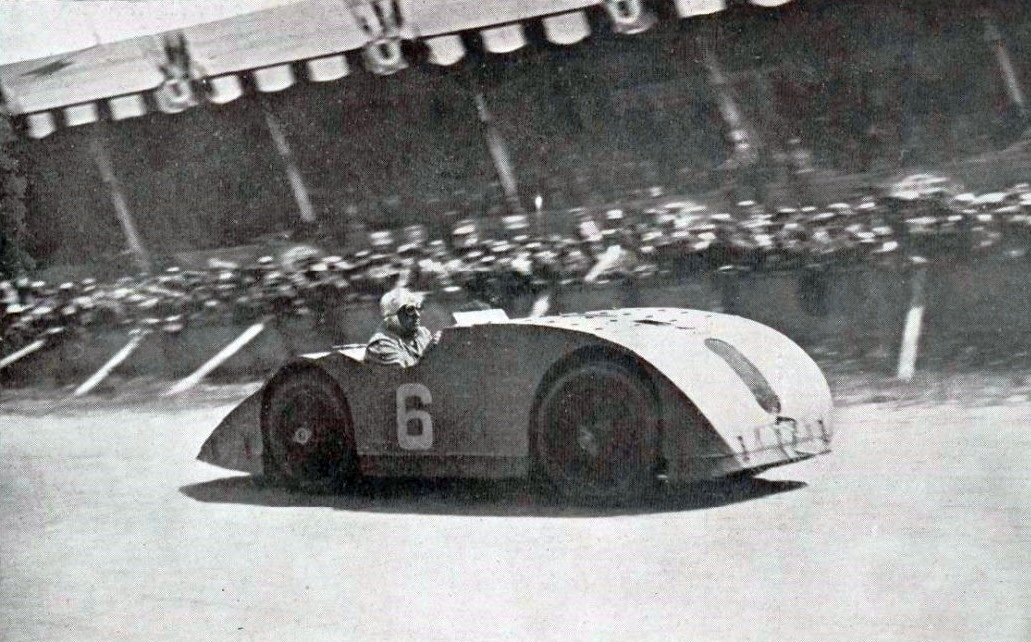
Ernest Friderich practicing in the Bugatti Type 32 for the French GP

Gabriel Voisin drew upon his previous experience in aircraft design for his Grand Prix car. Like the Bugatti, it also featured harsh enclosed aluminium bodywork on a semi-monocoque timber chassis. However, the car was stymied by the underpowered sleeve-valve engine. Delage went down a completely different track with a standard chassis but fitted with a twin-cam V12 engine designed by Charles Planchon.

The Benz-Tropfenwagen was ground-breaking in another way: as well as a teardrop-shaped body, the engine was mounted just ahead of the rear-axle. This mid-engine car foreshadowed the GP cars seen over 30 years later. It also employed independent suspension on all four wheels which was another first for a Grand Prix car.

Manufacturer	Model	Engine	Power Output	Max. Speed (km/h)	Dry Weight (kg)
(Italy) Fiat	805-405	FIAT 1979cc S6 supercharged	130 bhp	220	680
(Italy) Alfa Romeo	GPR (P1)	Alfa Romeo 1990cc S6	95 bhp	180	850
(Italy) Diatto	Tipo 20 S	Diatto 1997cc S4	75 bhp	155	700
(France) Bugatti	Type 32	Bugatti 1991cc S8	100 bhp	190	660
(France) Voisin	C6 Laboratoire	Voisin 1978cc S6	90 bhp	175	710
(United Kingdom) Sunbeam		Sunbeam 1988cc S6	108 bhp	180	675
(Germany) Mercedes	M7294	Mercedes 1990cc S4 supercharged	120 bhp	180	750
(Germany) Benz	RH Tropfenwagen	Benz 1998cc S6	95 bhp	185	745
(United States) Miller	122	Miller 1978cc S8	120 bhp	186	850

== Season review ==
As usual, the first major race of the season was the Targa Florio across northern Sicily. The winner of the last two times, the Conte Giulio Masetti was invited to join the official Alfa Corse works team. The company made a big effort with five entries. Masetti, Antonio Ascari and the veteran Giuseppe Campari had the 2.9-litre of the RL model. Ugo Sivocci had the 3.2-litre version while Enzo Ferrari ran an ES model. There was not as much international interest this year. Aside from Alfieri Maserati's 2-car Diatto team, a three-car team came from Steyr (including Italian drivers Ferdinando Minoia and Conte Gastone Brilli-Peri). André Boillot bought a Peugeot 174 Sports, and privateers filled out the field of seventeen.

The Alfa Romeos controlled the race. Although Campari and Ferrari retired, Ascari had the fastest lap and would have won. However, on the last lap his engine broke at Cerda within sight of the line. With push-starts not allowed, by the time his mechanic was able to get it going again, team-mate Sivocci had made up the time and won by three minutes. Minoia brought home his Steyr in third, just ahead of Masetti. From the great publicity across Italy, and in celebration of the 1–2 victory, Alfa Romeo named the car the “RL Targa Florio”. It also encouraged Nicola Romeo to look at building a Grand Prix car.

Jimmy Murphy's victory the previous year in the Indianapolis 500 had attracted a lot of interest in Harry Miller's engines. The entry list for this year's event included 11 of the new Miller 122 (in its various guises) in the 24 starters. Cliff Durant had a number made up and eight were entered as Durant Specials. The drivers included Murphy, Eddie Hearne, Harry Hartz and Cliff Durant himself. Harry C. Stutz had another two entered as HCS Specials for Tommy Milton and Howdy Wilcox. Packard returned for the second and last time. Its drivers were the veterans Ralph DePalma, Dario Resta and Joe Boyer. Fred Duesenberg was a late arrival, with just the single car ready for rookie Wade Morton.

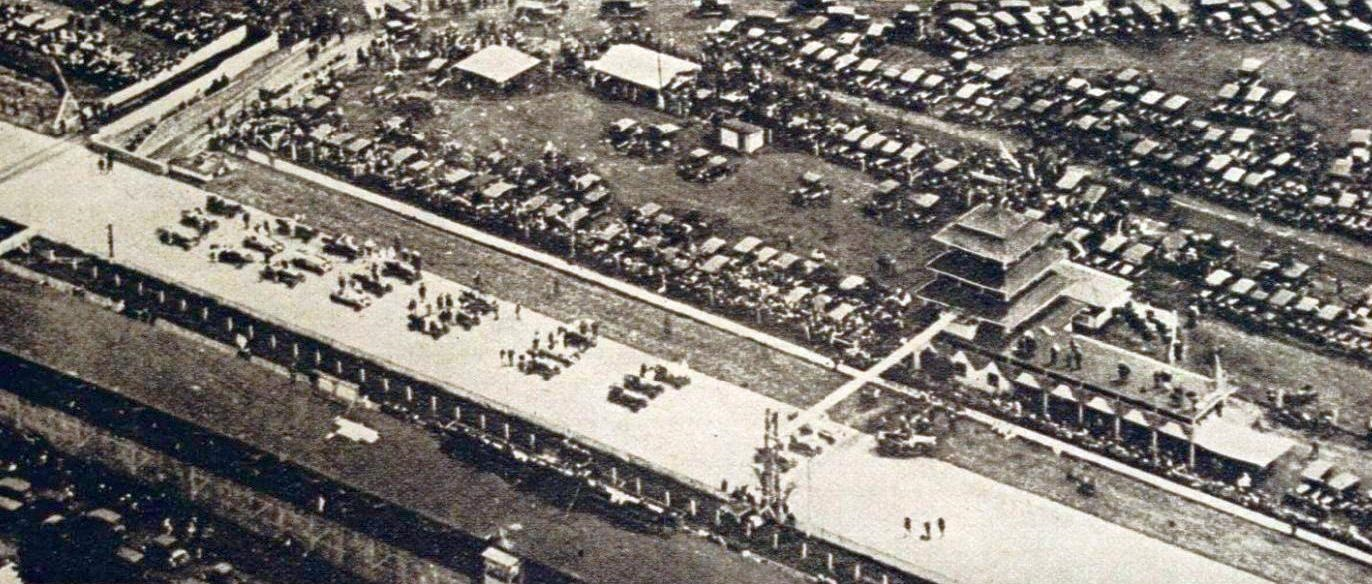
Lined up for the start of the Indianapolis 500

With a unified formula again, European interest was renewed in the Indianapolis 500. Bugatti had five Type 30s modified as single-seaters. Pierre de Vizcaya and Betrand, Prince of Cystria were joined by British Aston Martin-driver, Louis Zborowski and wealthy Argentineans Martín de Álzaga and Raúl Riganti. Mercedes brought their three 1.5-litre cars, being the first supercharged cars at the event, along with perennial drivers Christian Lautenschlager, Max Sailer and Christian Werner.

Milton threw down the gauntlet from the start setting a new qualifying record of 108.7 mph to take pole position. Early in the race, Lautenschlager was cornering, engaged the supercharger too soon and spun into the wall. The two other Mercedes initially provided a close contest but engine issues dropped Werner and Sailer back to third and fourth by halfway and they eventually finished down the field. In an exciting first half of the race the lead changed 25 times: initially between Milton and Murphy, until Wilcox and Durant pushed up to vie for the lead. When Wilcox had to retire after 60 laps, he relieved Milton in his car for the third quarter of the race. The Milton/Wilcox car eased ahead and, between them, they led the second half of the race. Milton went on to become the first two-time winner of the race, ahead of the Durant-Millers of Hartz, Murphy and Hearne. Milton collected almost $30000 in prize-money (the average industrial worker's salary was about $1500). It was at a cost, as his hands were badly injured, firstly by blisters from his driving gloves shrinking and then scalded from the glue out of the steering wheel.

Milton, Murphy, Hearn and the Miller drivers won all the races in the 8-race AAA season, blocking out Duesenberg. With two wins and four seconds across the season, Eddie Hearn was retroactively announced in 1927 as Champion for the Year. Murphy was runner-up as he missed the latter part of the season to take his Miller across to Europe. Howdy Wilcox, however, was killed at the inaugural Altoona 200 in September.

In June the Swiss motorcycle Grand Prix at Geneva was supplemented by a race for cyclecars, the first car race for Switzerland. It was won by Ramon Bueno in a Salmson GP, with his teammate Robert Benoist coming in second. A week later the Circuito del Savio was held at Ravenna. It was won by Enzo Ferrari who was presented with a shield by the parents of fallen Italian fighter-ace Francesco Baracca. It depicted his emblem, a black prancing horse, that would become the badge on Ferrari cars.

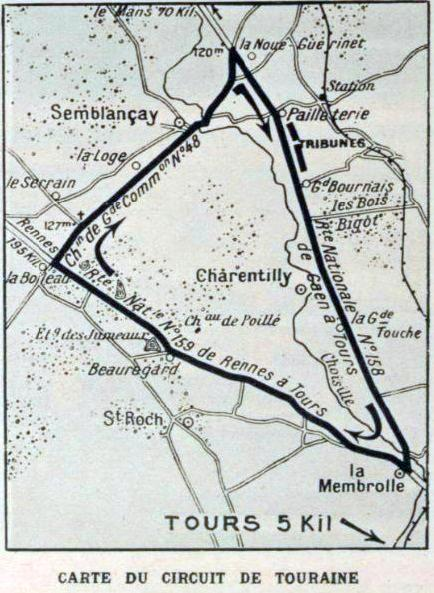
French Grand Prix circuit near Tours

The French Grand Prix was moved again, this year to Tours, on a 23 km triangular track on public roads just northwest of the city. Six works teams were entered and each had the first appearance of their new or upgraded cars for the season. The Bugatti “tanks” were driven by Ernest Friderich, Pierre De Vizcaya and Pierre Marco, the Prince of Cystria. The short wheelbase made them very nimble through the corners but unstable on the straights. Voisin had three cars, driven by pre-war veterans Arthur Duray and Henri Rougier, along with André Lefèbvre. Rolland-Pilain had two cars for Albert Guyot and Victor Hémery. Finally, Delage had just the single car for René Thomas.

From Italy, Fiat had their supercharged Type 805 for works drivers Pietro Bordino, Enrico Giaccone and Carlo Salomano. The British Sunbeam team also had three cars, with their new model heavily influenced by the 1922 Fiat. Their drivers were Kenelm Lee Guinness, Henry Segrave and Albert Divo.

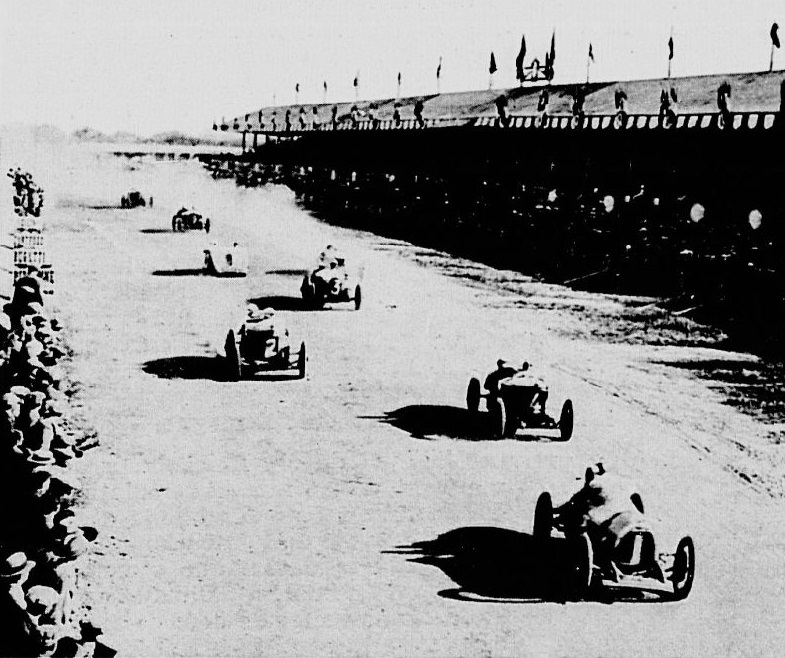
Start of the French Grand Prix

From the rolling start Bordino came from the second row to lead at the first corner. De Vizcaya misjudged his braking in the new Bugatti and careered off the road and through a fence. Sixteen spectators were injured. The race soon separated into two competitions: Fiat versus Sunbeam at the front and Bugatti versus Voisin further back. Bordino impressed many with his bravery and speed and led for nine laps until waylaid by engine problems: the supercharger was too close to the road and had sucked stones and dust into the engine. Guinness took the lead pursued by Giaccone. Then the Sunbeam's clutch began slipping and they had to stop to tie a rope to pull it. Dropping to sixth he then had to stop again as his mechanic had been knocked unconscious by stones when putting his head out to pull the rope. Meanwhile, Giaccone had taken the lead until he too was stopped, on the 16th lap, by the same supercharger issue as his teammate Bordino.

This now put the Fiat of Salomano in front with the Sunbeams of Divo and Segrave chasing. Divo gradually fell back as he had to stop every lap to top up with petrol as his tank had sprung a leak. Then on the 30th lap Salomano ran out of fuel. His mechanic ran back to the pits, grabbed a can of petrol and bicycled back to the stricken car. But the car failed to restart and that allowed Segrave to take a lead he held onto for the remaining five laps. Divo was second with Friderich just passing Guinness on the last lap to get a podium for Bugatti. André Lefèbvre's Voisin was the fifth and final finisher, 75 minutes behind Segrave. It was Britain's greatest motoring triumph to date with (American-born) Segrave also the first British driver to win a Grand Prix. After an abbreviated race and early retirement for his car, Louis Delâge fired designer Planchon.

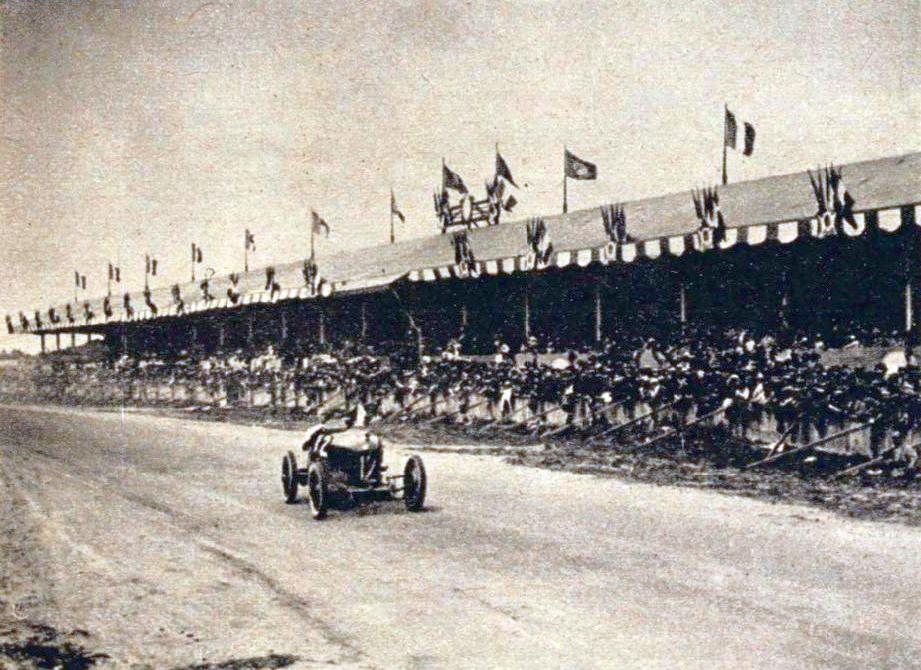
Segrave's Sunbeam on the main straight, French GP

By the time of the Italian Grand Prix, the Fiats had been redesigned with a new Roots-type supercharger, and on the smooth paved circuit would not have the same engine issues as had afflicted them in France. Once again, the foreign opposition saw it as a lost cause and chose not to turn up. Only Voisin and Rolland-Pilain came to Monza. The new Alfa Romeos were ready, and three cars were entered for Campari, Sivocci and Ascari. Another notable arrival was the Benz team with three of their streamlined Tropfenwagen cars, driven by Minoia, Franz Horner and Willy Walb. And from America came Jimmy Murphy and Count Zborowski driving the oval-specialist Miller 122s. The cars had to be specially modified to tightly squeeze in a mechanic still required under the AIACR regulations.

But once again the race was tainted by tragedy. A fortnight before the race, Bordino and Giaccone were testing the Fiat when its axle broke and they crashed on the oval. Giaccone died in hospital and Bordino suffered a broken wrist and dislocated shoulder. Veteran Felice Nazzaro was bought in to replace Giaccone. Alfa driver Ugo Sivocci was killed when he hit a tree during a wet practice, and the rest of the team was withdrawn and the P1 was never raced.

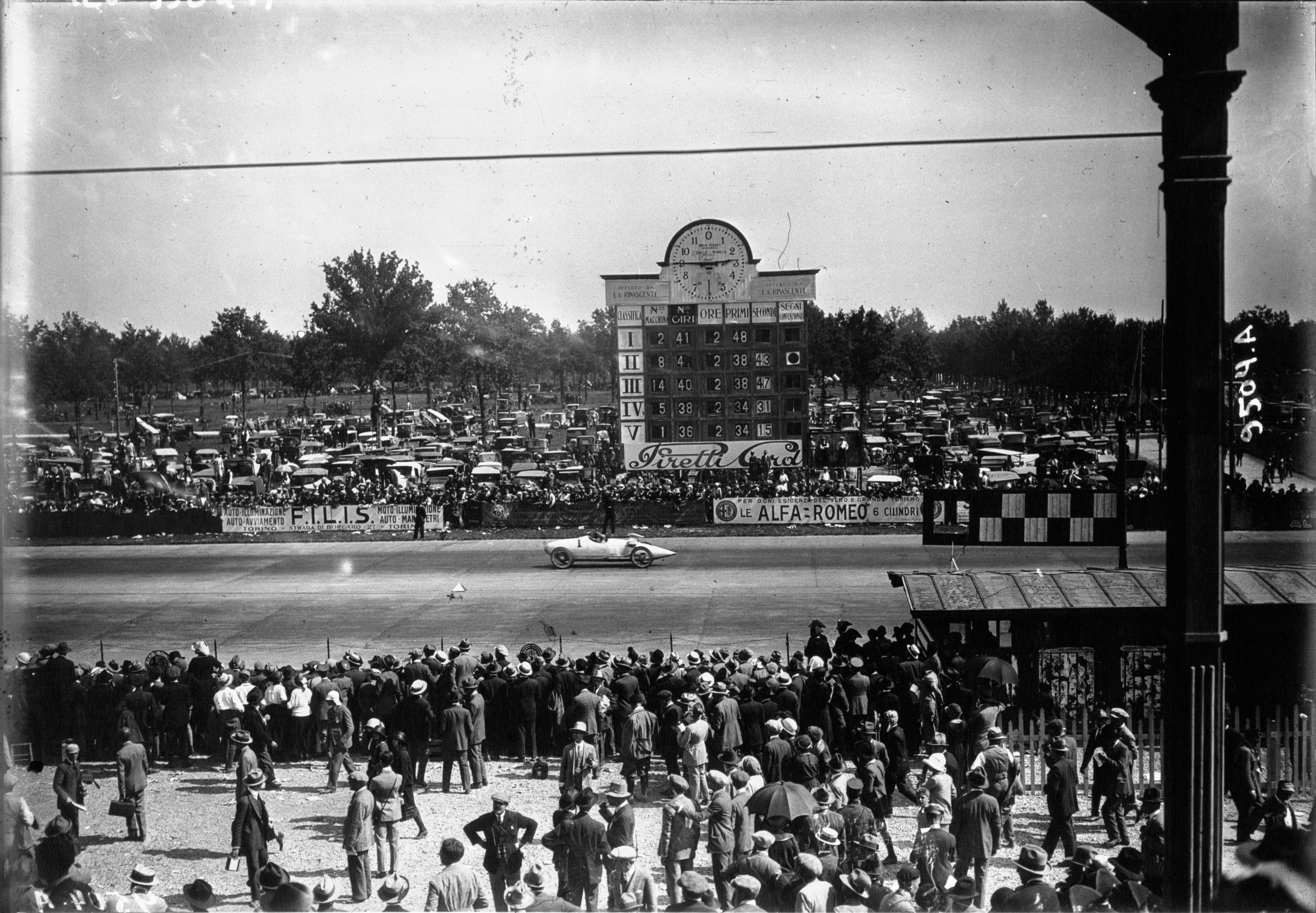
Minoia's Benz at the Italian GP

The race was started by Benito Mussolini, the recently appointed Prime Minister and ardent racing fan. Bordino drove despite his broken arm, with his mechanic doing the gear changes but it did not slow him down. He set a blistering pace and led for over half the race until the exhaustion of the effort finally overtook him and he had to retire. Nazzaro took the lead but when he had to stop to refill water with just two laps remaining, Salomano overtook him and held on for the victory. Murphy finished third, his race compromised by the car's lack of traction on the road-circuit portion. This marked the first Grand Prix win for a supercharged car, and Salomano's new lap record of 3:46.4 (159.08 km/h) eclipsed Bordino's one of 3:55 (146.9 km/h) from the year before. Although it was his only major triumph, he remained a test-driver for Fiat until the 1960s.

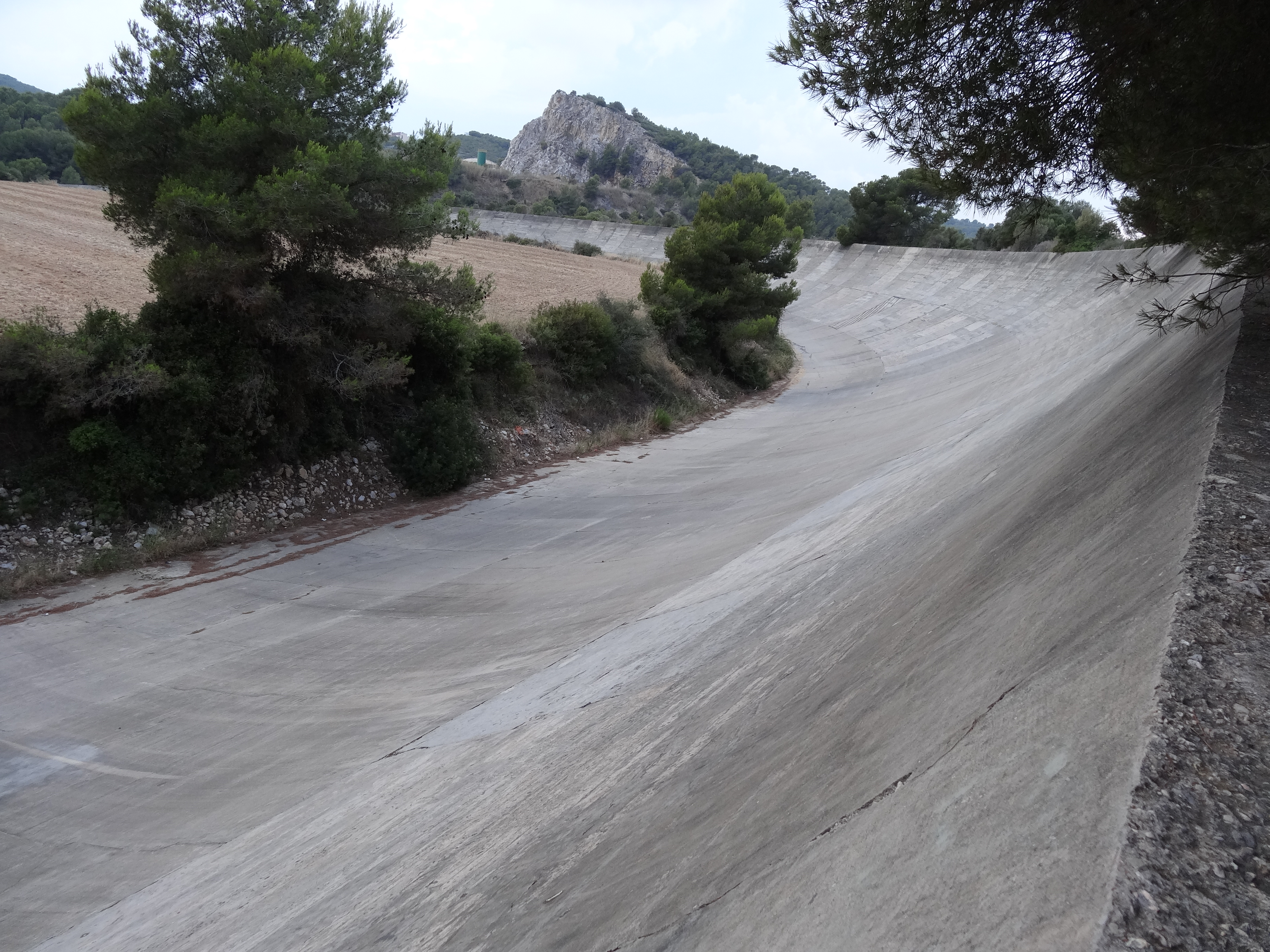
The banking at the Autódromo de Sitges-Terramar

Motor-racing in Spain had developed quickly after the war. However, the new event in July at San Sebastián was poorly supported by international teams. Albert Guyot won the main race, for Rolland-Pilain, with just five runners. In October, Albert Divo won the voiturette race at Penya Rhin in the new Talbot 70 – a race significant for the presence of motorcycle racer Tazio Nuvolari in the Chiribiri works team. He finished fifth, three laps behind. A week later Divo won in a Sunbeam at Sitges, near Barcelona. Again, the event had a small entry – with Benz and Rolland-Pilain not arriving. Jimmy Murphy and Martin de Álzaga were going to race Millers but in the end only Zborowski arrived, finishing second albeit with the fastest lap. Just opened by King Alfonso, who was a keen racing enthusiast himself, the newly built oval was the first closed circuit in Spain. But the 2 km track had been poorly designed with steep banking, was unpopular with the drivers, and was barely used again and closed soon afterwards. Dario Resta then won the voiturette grand prix there, for Talbot again.

In the aftermath of Sivocci's death, the Alfa Romeo team adopted his personal emblem, the green four-leaf clover, on their cars. The racing number “17”, from the car he died in, has not been used on Italian racing cars since. Enzo Ferrari was able to convince Vittorio Jano, one of Fiat's engineers, to join them starting a legendary career. The below-par performance of the Miller at the Italian Grand Prix was the final proof of the vastly different racing set-ups required for road-racing (predominant in Europe) versus oval racing (as practiced in North America).
