= Fengler =

Fengler is a surname. It is the 84,974th most common surname in the world. It's most prevalent in Germany, although many share it across different parts of the world.

Notable people with the surname include:

- Harlan Fengler (1903–1981), American racecar driver
- Michael Fengler (born 1940), German film producer
- Stefan Fengler (born 1968), German footballer
