= List of 1923 motorsport champions =

1923 motorsport champions
Previous: 1922	Next: 1924

This is a list of national or international auto racing series with a Championship decided by the points or positions earned by a driver from multiple races.

== Open wheel racing ==
Series	Driver	Season article
AAA National Championship	(United States) Eddie Hearne	1923 AAA Championship Car season

== See also ==
- List of motorsport championships
- Auto racing
