= 1920 in motorsport =

The following is an overview of the events of 1920 in motorsport including the major racing events, motorsport venues that were opened and closed during a year, championships and non-championship events that were established and disestablished in a year, and births and deaths of racing drivers and other motorsport people.

== Annual events ==
The calendar includes only annual major non-championship events or annual events that had own significance separate from the championship. For the dates of the championship events see related season articles.

Date	Event	Ref
31 May	8th Indianapolis 500	
15–16 June	9th Isle of Man TT	
24 October	11th Targa Florio	

== Births ==
Date	Month	Name	Nationality	Occupation	Note	Ref
3	February	Tony Gaze	Australian	Racing driver	The first Australian Formula One driver.	
30	April	Duncan Hamilton	British	Racing driver	24 Hours of Le Mans winner (1953).	

== Deaths ==
Date	Month	Name	Age	Nationality	Occupation	Note	Ref
25	November	Gaston Chevrolet	28	American	Racing driver	Indianapolis 500 winner (1920).	

== See also ==
- List of 1920 motorsport champions
