= List of 1922 motorsport champions =

1922 motorsport champions
| Previous: 1921 | Next: 1923 |

This list of 1922 motorsport champions is a list of national or international auto racing series with a Championship decided by the points or positions earned by a driver from multiple races.

== Open wheel racing ==
| Series | Driver | Season article |
|---|---|---|
| AAA National Championship | (United States) Jimmy Murphy | 1922 AAA Championship Car season |

== See also ==
- List of motorsport championships
- Auto racing
