= List of 1925 motorsport champions =

1925 motorsport champions
Previous: 1924	Next: 1926

This list of 1925 motorsport champions is a list of national/international auto racing series with a Championship decided by the points or positions earned by a driver from multiple races.

== Open wheel racing ==
Series	Champion	Season article
AIACR World Manufacturers' Championship	(Italy) Alfa Romeo	1925 Grand Prix season
AAA National Championship	(United States) Pete DePaolo	1925 AAA Championship Car season

== See also ==
- List of motorsport championships
- Auto racing
