= Autódromo de Sitges-Terramar =

Former racing track in Spain

- Grand Prix Circuit (1923–1955)
- Location: Sant Pere de Ribes, Barcelona, Catalonia, Spain
- Coordinates: 41°14′18″N 1°46′50″E
- Broke ground: January 1923; 103 years ago
- Opened: 28 October 1923; 102 years ago
- Closed: September 1955; 71 years ago
- Major events: Spanish Grand Prix (1923)
- Website: https://www.autodrom-terramar.com/

Grand Prix Circuit (1923–1955)
- Length: 2.000 km (1.243 mi)
- Turns: 2
- Banking: 66° (maximal value in corners)
- Race lap record: 0:45.800 ( (United Kingdom) Louis Zborowski, Miller 122, 1923, GP)

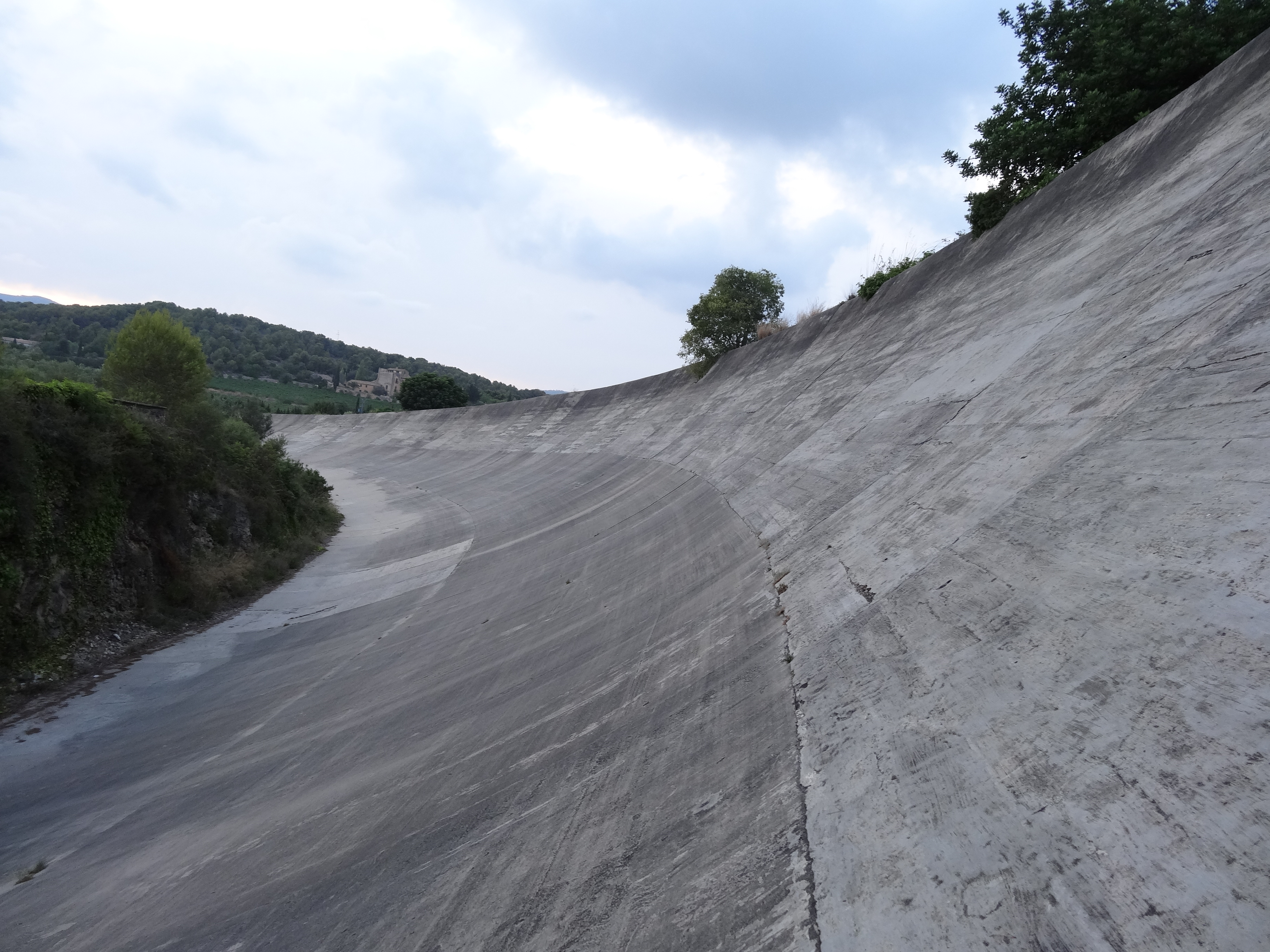
Banked curve of Autòdrom de Sitges-Terramar from 2012

The Autòdrom de Sitges-Terramar is a former racing circuit located in the small village of Rocamar, in Sant Pere de Ribes near Sitges in Barcelona, Catalonia, Spain. It was built in 1923 within 300 days, and was one of the first racetracks in the world. At the time, Europe had only two racetracks, Brooklands and Monza, and the United States only had Indianapolis and Milwaukee. Although minor races were sporadically held on the circuit through the 1950s, it was largely abandoned after the inaugural season of 1923. Now, it has seen use only as the backdrop to a selection of car advertisements, a filming location for an episode of the Amazon Prime series The Grand Tour, and as a chicken farm.

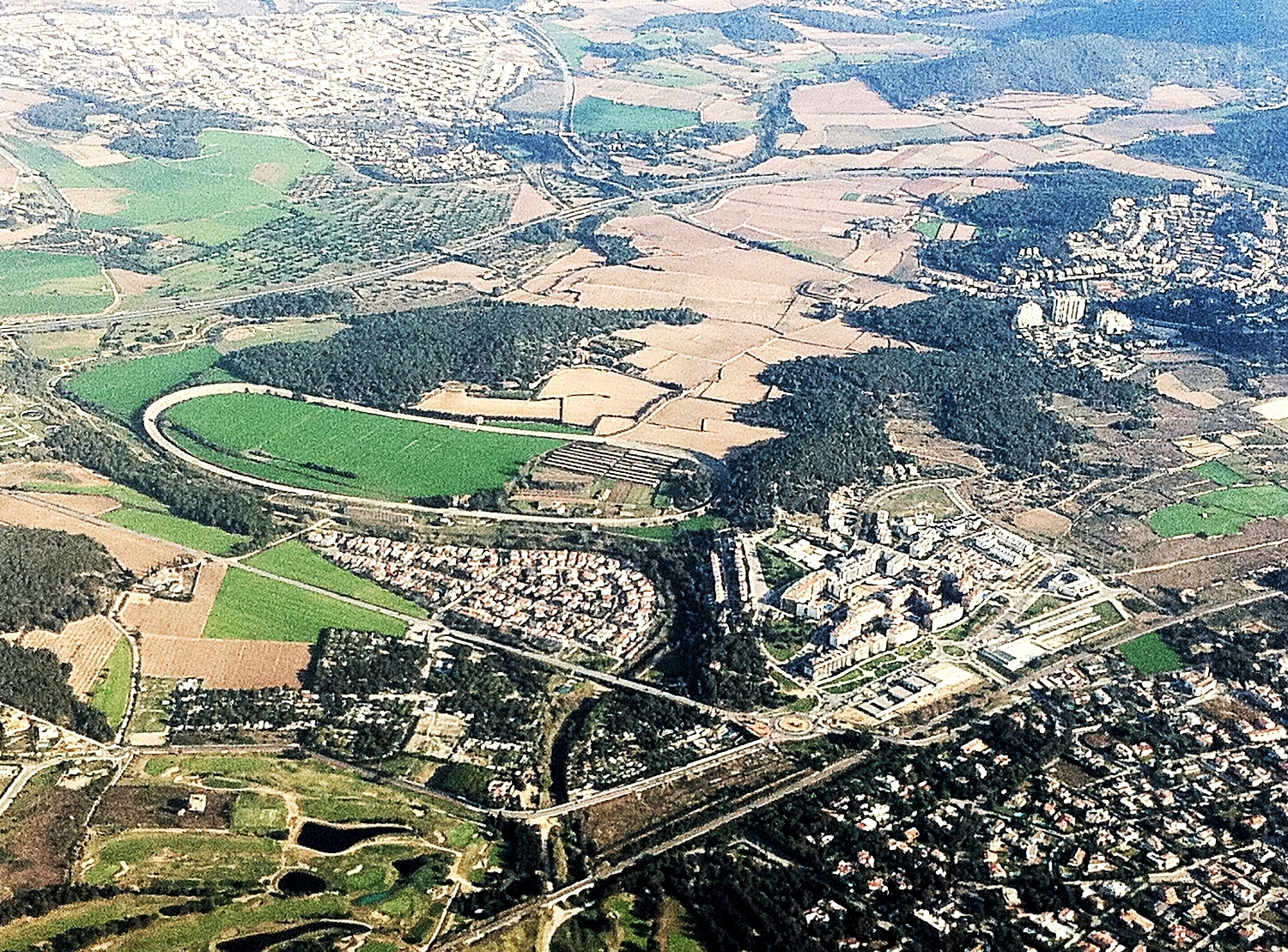
Aerial view of the circuit

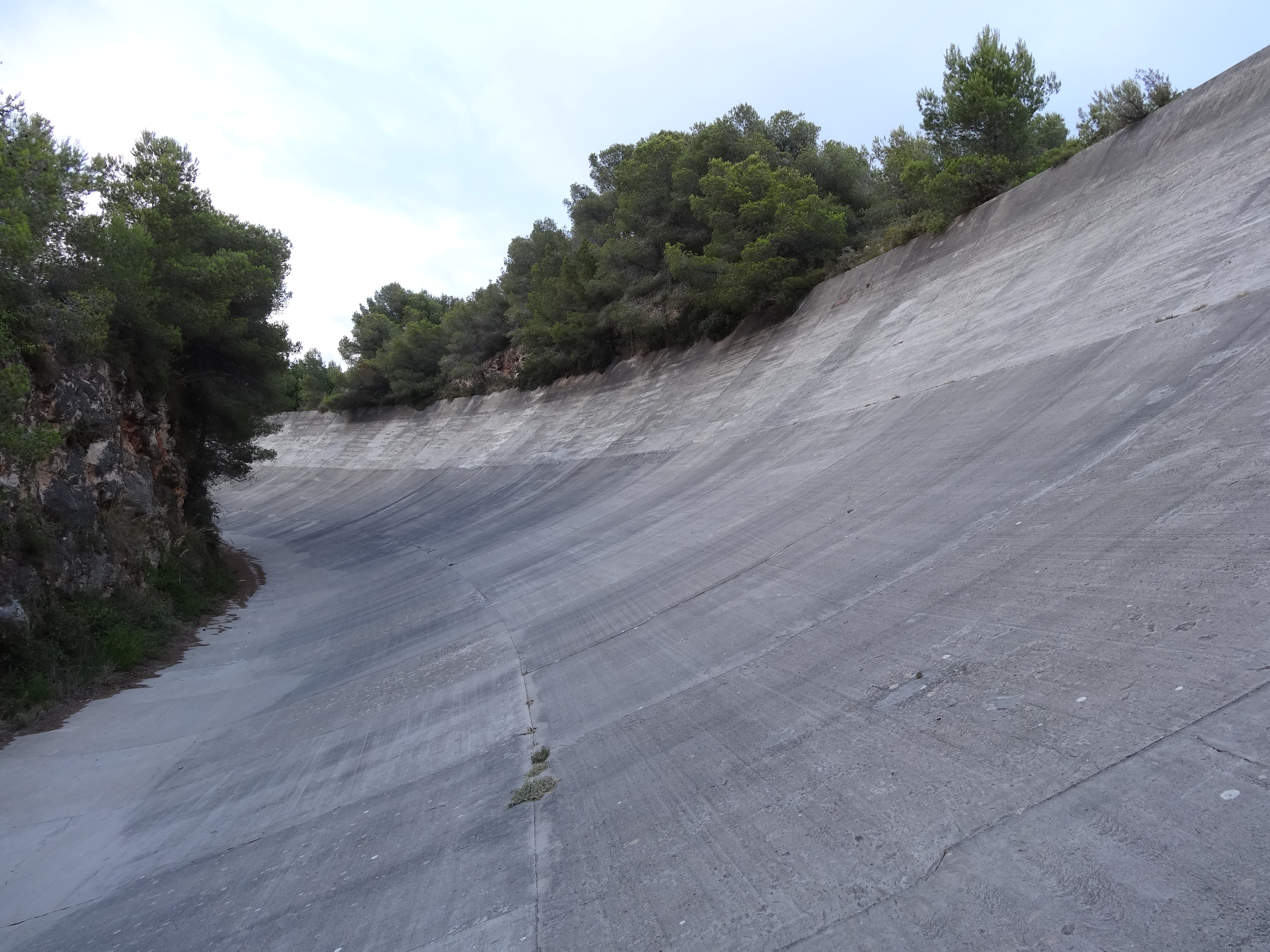
Banked curve of the circuit (2012)

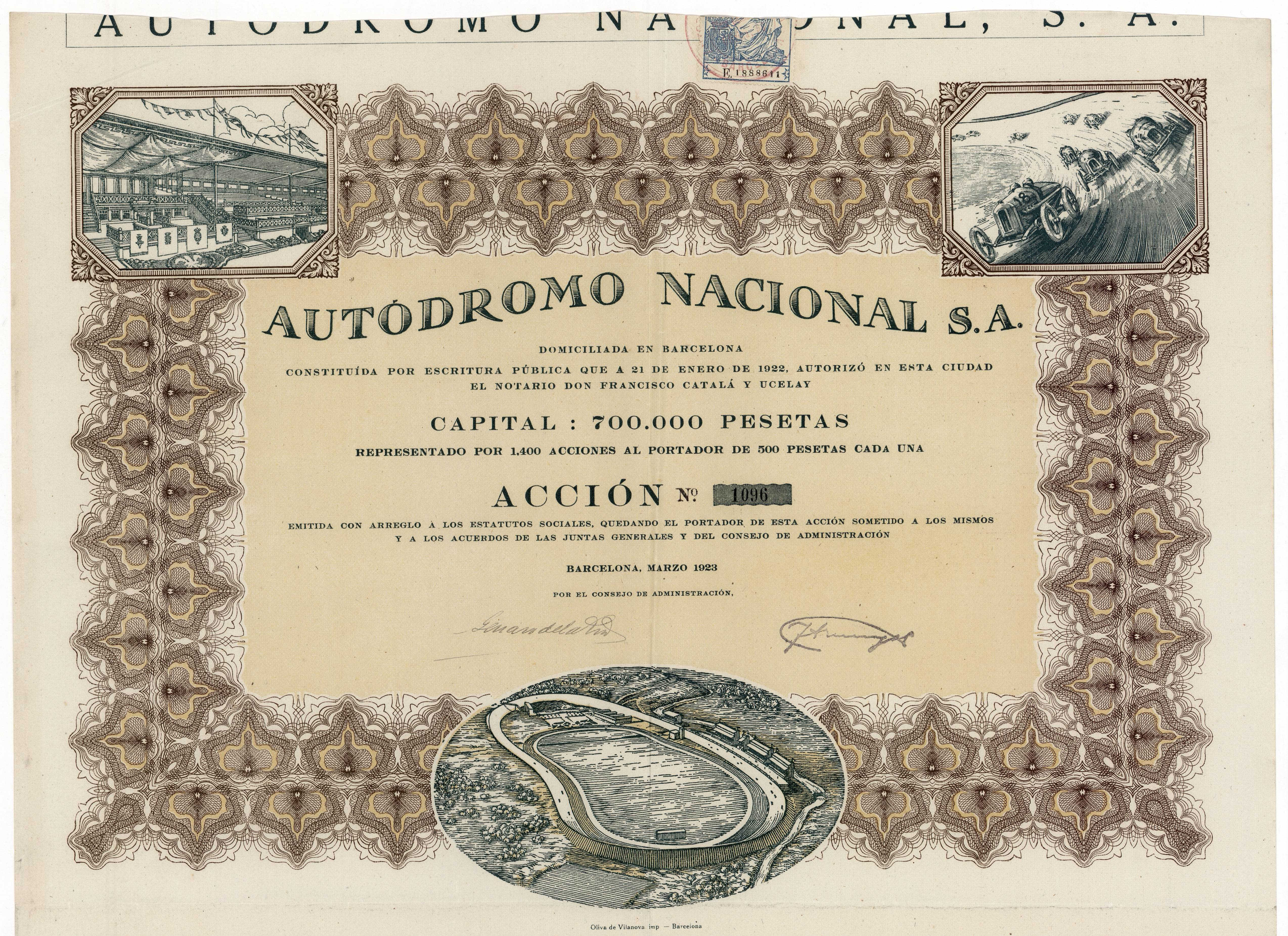
Acción del Autódromo Nacional S.A. de marzo de 1923

== History ==
The Autodrome of Terramar was one of the jewels born from the creation and development of the Terramar Residential Development in Sitges. Promoted by the Sabadell industrialist Francesc Armengol, Terramar was an innovative garden city inspired by the urban and cultural model of Nice and the French Riviera: a resting place on the seafront, with large green spaces, with villas. and stately buildings and a series of complementary services in line with the social and cultural parameters of the place and time. Terramar, as a whole, was one of the greatest expressions of Noucentisme in Catalonia: order, urbanity, quality and a return to classical forms.

The Autòdrom was one of these services incorporated into the Terramar project, as was a casino which was eventually not carried out, a hotel, the Noucentista gardens or, years later, the golf club. These facilities complemented the mansions built along the Paseo Marítimo in Sitges since 1919, with buildings designed by the architects Josep Maria Martino, Miquel Utrillo, Josep Renom and Josep Artigas. The urbanization project also had a cultural dimension, which was reflected in the magazine Terramar, published between 1919 and 1921 by the cultural dynamizer Josep Carbonell i Gener, who also promoted other relevant headlines of the time, such as Monitor (1921) and The Friend of the Arts (1926–29).

Francesc Armengol himself was one of the promoters of the construction of the Autòdrom in 1923 in the midst of the garden city development, in which he was the managing director for the first years of the existence of Terramar. The racing track was to respond to the growing interest in motor activities, which appeared in the early twentieth century. Built in just 300 days and at a cost of 4 million pesetas, the Autòdrom had the participation of two architects: Josep Maria Martino Arroyo for the grandstands and the market and Jaume Mestres i Fossas as the author of the project of the track. The director was Frederic Fric Armengué. The Board of Directors was chaired by Joan Pich i Pon, who had been a member of Parliament in 1919 and 1920 and who would later become mayor of Barcelona in 1935. The Autòdrom had an Honorary Committee chaired by the Duke of Alba, then president of the Royal Automobile Club of Spain.

The area where it was decided to build the Autòdrom was known as Mas Clot, in reference to the Clot dels Frares, the 18th-century building that dominates the area. The surface - of 25 hectares - was located within the municipal term of Sant Pere de Ribes, next to the one of Sitges and the urbanization Terramar. According to the deed of acquisition of the property, registered before the notary of Vilanova i la Geltrú, the land was “house, donkey, field-vineyard and woods with barrels, vats and presses, pipes and other containers and furniture with the exception of those of the settler and existing family memories in it ”. The project designed by the architects provided, in addition to the circuit, the construction of two smaller runways, one for horses and the other for motorcycles, as well as a football field and a field for the landing of small planes, which were thought to later become a golf course.

The presentation of the works was held on 17 September 1922, with a wide social, cultural and economic representation of Sitges, Sant Pere de Ribes and Barcelona. King Alfonso XIII was even invited, but delegated the representation to the Captain General of Catalonia, Miguel Primo de Rivera, Marquis of Estella.

=== Race events ===
The opening ceremony was held on 28 October 1923. The event was for 2-litre GP cars and was won by Albert Divo in a Sunbeam defeating Count Louis Zborowski in a Miller, with a winning speed of 96.91 mph (155.96 km/h). No prize money was awarded. Unpaid construction overruns caused the builders to seize the gate receipts, leaving the organizers with no money to pay the drivers. As a result, the track was forbidden to host international races again. Drivers also complained about the entry and exit from the bankings claiming the transition from straight to banking and back again was poorly designed. Catalunyan Automobile Club and the Penya Rhin continued to hold races in 1925 with little success.

The works lasted only 300 days and the inaugural ceremony of the facilities was held on 28 October 1923, with the assistance of the infant Alfonso de Borbón, representing the Royal House. Despite the heavy rain that fell that day, the inaugural events brought together thousands of people who arrived in Sitges and the circuit itself. After the inaugural events, the first race was held, won by Alberto Divo with his Sunbeam, who did the marked route in 2 hours, 48 minutes and 5 seconds, at an average of 142 kilometers per hour. Divo received five trophies: the King’s Cup, the Italian Ambassador’s Cup, the Omnia Cup, the RACE Cup and the Liceu Circle Cup. Motorcycle and motorcycle races were also held during the following days.

The high expectation of its inauguration was, however, immediately affected by the economic problems caused by the construction company, which was unable to raise the capital to cover construction costs. However, in the following years there were still races, such as the Spanish Motorcycle Championship, organized by the royal Moto Club of Catalonia in May 1925, and which was attended by Alfonso XIII, and the president of the Government, the dictator Miguel Primo de Rivera. In the same year, 1925, other races were carried out, such as the one organized by the Penya Rhin, where a Bugatti was presented for the first time, the 10 km race, organized by the RACC and the Penya Rhin itself, and the 80-lap race on the circuit, promoted by the Sabadell Velocipèdic Club.

The RACC and the Penya Rhin repeated their races in the following months, both in November 1925 and January 1926. In December of that year the Sitges Prize was held and in the spring of 1927 the motorcycle tournaments were held in category 250, 350 and 500 cc, convened again by the Peña Rhin, which organized a second edition in the spring of 1929.

=== Demise ===
The economic problems, however, meant that in 1929 the state seized the estates of Mas dels Frares and Clot d’en Sidós and, later, the whole circuit. The following year, Czechoslovak racer Edgar de Morawitz and Frank took over the property, with the aim of reactivating the circuit and serving the motor world. De Morawitz erected a building inside the enclosure that became a piston factory of the Champion brand. Pieces were also built for the Sitjes National brand.

In August 1931, the Autòdrom resumed activity with various speed tests (such as competition between a vehicle and a small plane) and acrobatic flights. In the following months, new events were held, such as the Easter Cup (1932), motorcycle, cycling and aviation races, organized by the Aereo Club de Catalunya.

Between November 1933 and 1936, however, there are no races held at the venue. A car show was scheduled for May 1936, but was not held. The outbreak of the Civil War, two months later, stopped the activity of the Autòdrom. During the conflict, the circuit hosted a military recruitment centre.

After the war, the critical economic and social situation of the country made it impossible to reactivate the facilities. In addition, the growing capacity of the new vehicles was an obstacle in the characteristics of the circuit, which had steep slopes, which were a danger when speed increased. On the death of Edgar de Morawitz (1945), his widow and children sold the property to Dolors de Nadal de Llinàs In the following years, the circuit was the subject of several sales operations and passed through the hands of Miquel Soler and Elias (1949), Margarida de Udaeta and Gil (1952) and Maria Teresa Lloret Teisseire (1956).

In those years, the life of the circuit was practically non-existent, although it hosted some sporadic events, such as a stage of the Cycling Tour of Catalonia (1954), a session of the Tour of Catalonia by Car (1955) or a motorcycle competition organized by the Penya Maricel and the Moto Club Sitges (1955).

At that time, the interiors of the track housed the installation of poultry farms and the site changed its orientation towards agricultural activity. The facilities began to suffer a gradual abandonment and the track was also damaged by the passage of trucks that accessed the interior to transport poultry goods. This use continued until the 1980s. It was rediscovered by Canadian Peter Schomer in the 1990s, his plan was to build a Motorsport Resort on the property. Shortly afterwards, the space below the tiers hosted, for several months a year, the construction of the Carnival floats of the El Retiro Recreational Society of Sitges, until in 2001, the City Council of this town decided to build the bodywork of the floats at the Pruelles Industrial Park.

In 2009, the track was cleaned and minimal adaptations were made, which led to some car brands conducting corporate tests, vehicle presentations or spot filming. Former Formula 1 driver Marc Gené (2005), former rally champion Carlos Sáinz (2013) and former Moto GP champion Jorge Lorenzo (2013) have starred in various tests, as well as the Seat brands, Peugeot or Aston Martin, which have held various events, tests and presentations.

In 2012, Carlos Sainz Snr set a new lap record of 0:42.600 seconds in an Audi R8 LMS during filming of a promotional video for Red Bull.

2018 saw British automobile journalist Jeremy Clarkson, whilst hosting the Amazon Prime series The Grand Tour, and his co-hosts James May and Richard Hammond take advantage of a visit to Spain to experience the challenging, steeply sloped track of the Autòdrom. The incredible bank was enough to cause Clarkson and May to burst into a typical fit of expletives, and Hammond to begin making "squeeky noises."

2026 saw a new record being set at the historic track, as during a promotional video for the Stark VARG SM SKÖLL,, professional stunt and supermoto rider Jonas Skovby set a new lap record at the iconic circuit, with a lap time of 41.888 seconds, destroying the time previously set by Carlos Sainz Snr. The now iconic lap can be seen of youtube here.

== Future ==
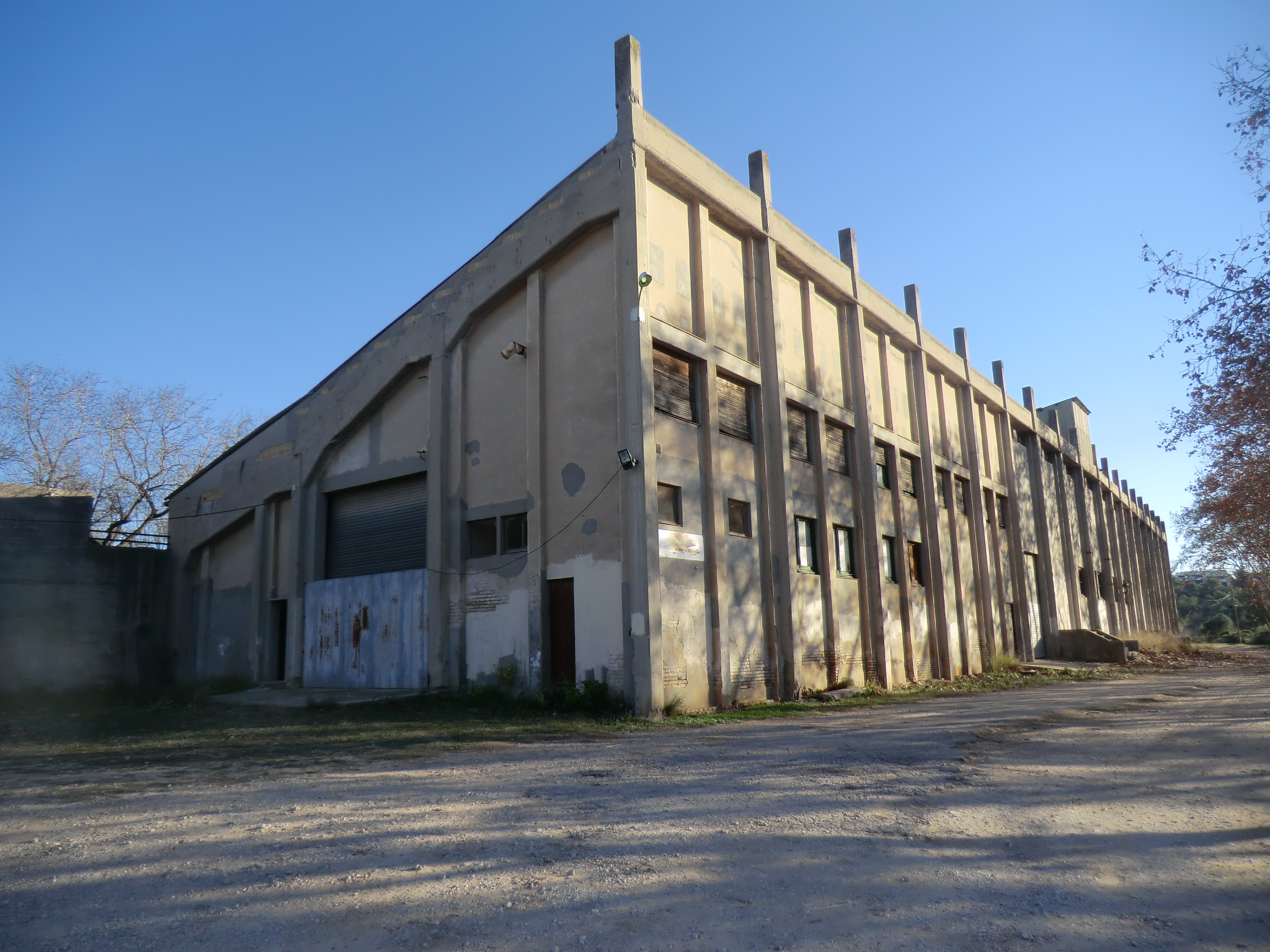
Terramar Autòdrom grandstand building.

In 2016, the Grand Prix group, which specializes in horse world events, presented the project to reopen the Autòdrom after being closed for sixty years. The initiative consists of adapting the facilities to host activities and equestrian events of international projection and, at the same time, take advantage of the circuit to carry out specific tests in the world of motoring, which provide continuity to its value as a historical piece of motorsport.

The project has been approved by both the City of Sant Pere de Ribes and the Generalitat de Catalunya, after four years of work with contributions and improvements by technicians from the various administrations involved (including urban planners, environmentalists, architects, and naturalists).

As of 2022, the Autòdrom is scheduled to reopen in 2023, after adapting the facilities to the approved project. The Autòdrom area as a whole has 65 hectares, of which only 5.3 are buildable and 14.4 are green areas. The rest are intended for the equestrian area, the track of the circuit, the tiers, and access. The project presented by the company has been designed with the premise of respecting the environment and integrating it into the landscape. They claim it is very important that to be conscious of their impact on the environment, and aspire to enhance the area’s natural legacy, even pledging to clean up the nearby riverbed. In fact, the Autòdrom has given up 40% of building land, to avoid overcrowding and ensure its environmental sustainability.

Once reopened, entry to the Autòdrom will be free for all visitors, who will be able to see the equestrian activities that will take place, especially in the autumn and winter months, when this hobby stops in the countries of central and northern Europe. Already 2021 saw more than 500 legitimate tourists visit the site, despite the ongoing COVID-19 Pandemic.

== Lap records ==
The fastest official race lap records at the Autódromo de Sitges-Terramar are listed as:

Category	Time	Driver	Vehicle	Event
Grand Prix Circuit (1923–1955): 2.000 km (1.243 mi)
GP	0:45.800	Louis Zborowski	Miller 122	1923 Spanish Grand Prix
Voiturette	0:50.300	Albert Divo	Talbot 70	1923 Spanish Voiturette Grand Prix

== Gran Premio de España ==
Season	Date	Winning driver	Winning team	Report
1923	28 October	(France) Albert Divo	Sunbeam	Report
