= List of 1920 motorsport champions =

1920 motorsport champions
Previous: 1919	Next: 1921

This list of 1920 motorsport champions is a list of national or international auto racing series with a Championship decided by the points or positions earned by a driver from multiple races.

== Open wheel racing ==
Series	Driver	Season article
AAA National Championship	(United States) Gaston Chevrolet	1920 AAA Championship Car season

== See also ==
- List of motorsport championships
- 1920 in motorsport
- 1920 Grand Prix season
