= 1923 AAA Championship Car season =

Auto racing season

- AAA National Championship Trail

Season
- Races: 8
- Start date: February 25, 1923
- End date: November 29, 1923

Awards
- National champion: (United States) Eddie Hearne
- Indianapolis 500 winner: (United States) Tommy Milton

The 1923 AAA Championship Car season consisted of 8 races, beginning at Beverly Hills, California on February 25, 1923, and concluding at the same location on November 29, 1923. The AAA National Champion was Eddie Hearne, and the Indianapolis 500 winner was Tommy Milton.

1919 Indianapolis 500 winner Howdy Wilcox died during the Altoona Speedway event on September 4, 1923.

== Schedule and results ==
All races running on Dirt/Brick/Board Oval.

Rnd	Date	Race name	Track	Location	Type	Pole position	Winning driver
1	February 25, 1923	(United States) Beverly Hills Race 1 - 250	Los Angeles Motor Speedway	Beverly Hills, California	Board	(United States) Frank Elliott	(United States) Jimmy Murphy
2	April 26, 1923	(United States) Raisin Day Classic 150	Fresno Speedway	Fresno, California	Board	—	(United States) Jimmy Murphy
3	May 30, 1923	(United States) International 500 Mile Sweepstakes	Indianapolis Motor Speedway	Speedway, Indiana	Brick	(United States) Tommy Milton	(United States) Tommy Milton
4	July 4, 1923	(United States) Kansas City Race 1 - 250	Kansas City Speedway	Kansas City, Missouri	Board	(United States) Jimmy Murphy	(United States) Eddie Hearne
5	September 4, 1923	(United States) Altoona Race - 200	Altoona Speedway	Tyrone, Pennsylvania	Board	(United States) Earl Cooper	(United States) Eddie Hearne
NC	September 15, 1923	(United States) Syracuse Race - 100	New York State Fairgrounds	Syracuse, New York	Dirt	—	(United States) Tommy Milton
6	September 29, 1923	(United States) San Joaquin Valley Classic - 200	Fresno Speedway	Fresno, California	Board	(United States) Harlan Fengler	(United States) Harry Hartz
7	October 21, 1923	(United States) Kansas City Race 2 - 250	Kansas City Speedway	Kansas City, Missouri	Board	—	(United States) Harlan Fengler
8	November 29, 1923	(United States) Beverly Hills Race 2 - 250	Los Angeles Motor Speedway	Beverly Hills, California	Board	—	(United States) Bennett Hill

Non-championship race

^A Shared drive

== Final points standings ==
Note: Drivers had to be running at the finish to score points. Points scored by drivers sharing a ride were split according to percentage of race driven. Starters were not allowed to score points as relief drivers, if a race starter finished the race in another car, in a points scoring position, those points were awarded to the driver who had started the car.

The final standings based on reference.

Pos	Driver	BEV1 (United States)	FRE1 (United States)	INDY (United States)	KAN1 (United States)	ALT (United States)	FRE2 (United States)	KAN2 (United States)	BEV2 (United States)	Pts
1	(United States) Eddie Hearne	4	2	4	1	1*	2	2	2	1882
2	(United States) Jimmy Murphy	1*	1*	3	**6**			3	3	1350
3	(United States) Bennett Hill	2	3	19	11	5	7	5	1	955
4	(United States) Harry Hartz	14	8	2	7	12	1	11	Wth	820
5	(United States) Tommy Milton	6	10	**1***	9	8	10*	10*	13	810
6	(United States) Harlan Fengler RY			16	3	14	**5**	1	4	750
7	(United States) Jerry Wunderlich	10	DNQ	10	12	2	3	4	14	368
8	(United States) Earl Cooper	11	4	21	2	**13**	9	12	12*	310
9	(United States) Frank Elliott	**5**	5	6	5	6	6	7	5	301
10	(United States) Dave Lewis			6	4	3		6		234
11	(United States) Ralph DePalma	3		15	8			8	6	190
12	(United States) Fred Comer R					4	4		9	115
13	(United States) L. L. Corum			5		11		13		90
14	(United States) Cliff Durant	9	9	7			DNS		9	42
15	(France) Bertrand Lucinge R			9						35
16	(United States) Phil Shafer			10					7	33
17	(United States) Wade Morton	7	7	10						32
18	(United States) Leon Duray	12	12	13	DNQ	7		9	10	30
19	(Germany) Max Sailer R			8						25
20	(United States) Joe Thomas	DNS	6							20
21	(United States) Joe Boyer			18					8	15
22	(Germany) Karl Sailer R			8						15
23	(United Kingdom) Dario Resta	8		14						13
24	(United States) Al Melcher	DNS					8			10
25	(United States) Ora Haibe			10	10	9		14		9
-	(United States) Howdy Wilcox			17	DNS	10				0
-	(United States) Thane Houser R			10						0
-	(United States) Peter DePaolo		11							0
-	(Germany) Christian Werner R			11						0
-	(United States) Wesley Crawford R								11	0
-	(Spain) Pierre de Vizcaya R			12						0
-	(United States) Ralph Snoddy	13								0
-	(United States) Louis Wilson R		DNS	13			DNS			0
-	(United States) Ernie Ansterburg R			14					15	0
-	(United States) Art Klein	15	DNQ							0
-	(United Kingdom) Louis Zborowski R			20						0
-	(United States) Tom Alley			21						0
-	(Argentina) Raúl Riganti R			22						0
-	(Germany) Christian Lautenschlager R			23						0
-	(Argentina) Martín de Álzaga R			24					DNP	0
-	(United States) Herbert Scheel			DNQ						0
-	(United States) Ira Vail			DNQ						0
-	(United States) Cornelius Van Ranst			DNQ						0
-	(France) Jules Goux			Wth						0
-	(France) Albert Guyot			Wth						0
-	(United States) Charles Shambaugh			Wth						0
-	(United States) Hollis Wells			Wth						0
-	(United States) P. O. Palmer		DNS							0
-	(United States) William White					DNS				0
-	(United States) Herschell McKee		DNP							0
-	(United States) Harry Thicksten			DNP						0
-	(United States) Louis Chevrolet					DNP				0
-	(France) Antoine Mourre								DNP	0
-	(United States) Ernie Olsen								DNP	0
-	(United States) Wally Butler								DSQ	0
Pos	Driver	BEV (United States)	FRE (United States)	INDY (United States)	KAN (United States)	ALT (United States)	FRE (United States)	KAN (United States)	BEV (United States)	Pts

Color	Result
Gold	Winner
Silver	2nd place
Bronze	3rd place
Green	4th & 5th place
Light Blue	6th-10th place
Dark Blue	Finished (Outside Top 10)
Purple	Did not finish (Ret)
Red	Did not qualify (DNQ)
Brown	Withdrawn (Wth)
Black	Disqualified (DSQ)
White	Did not start (DNS)
Blank	Did not participate (DNP)
Blank	Not competing

**In-line notation**
**Bold**	Pole position
Italics	Ran fastest race lap
*	Led most race laps
Rookie of the Year
Rookie

== See also ==
- 1923 Indianapolis 500
