= Pierre de Vizcaya =

Spanish racing driver (1894–1933)

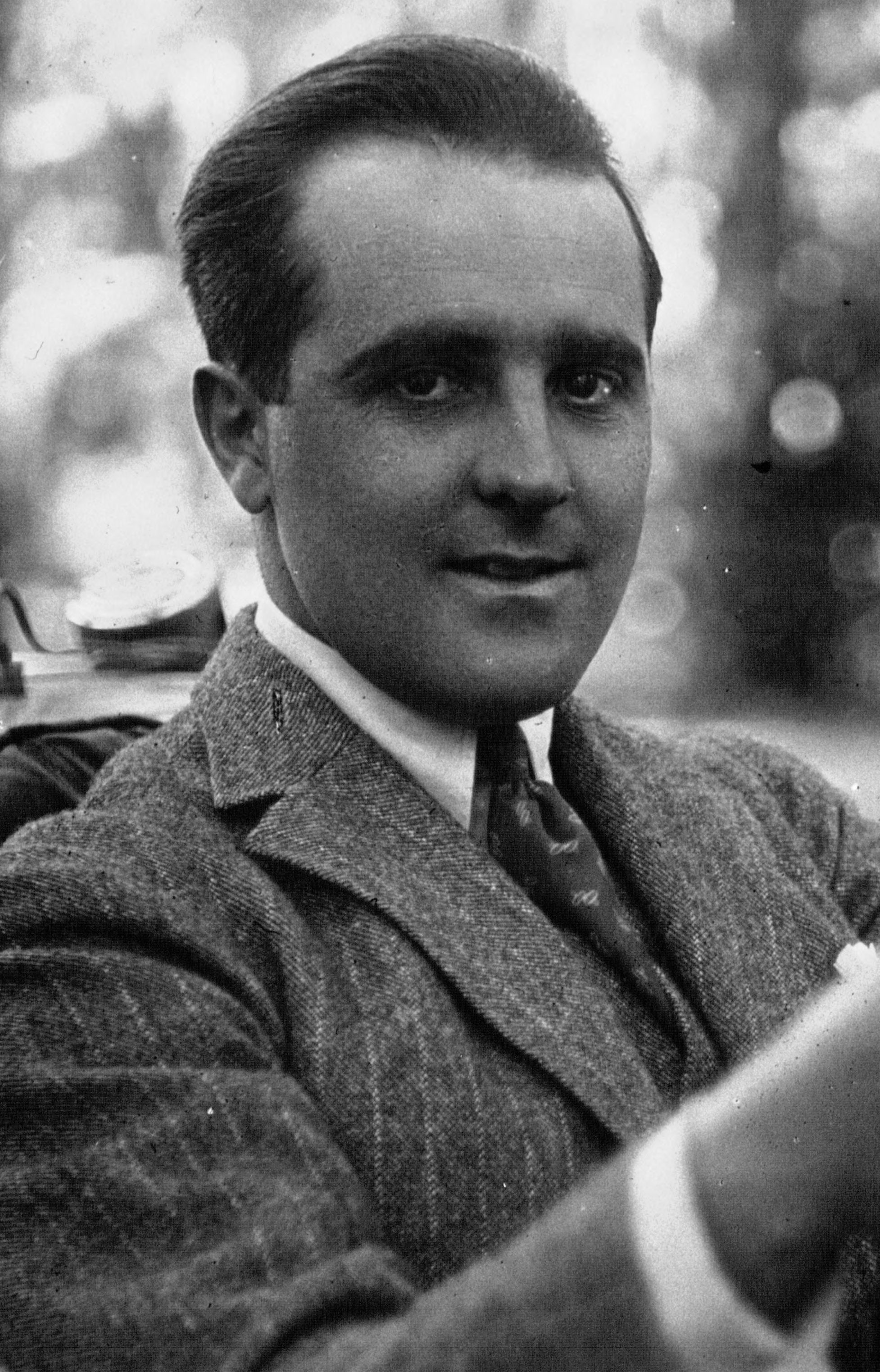
- de Vizcaya in 1922
- Born: Marie Jean Pierre de Vizcaya Laurent; 5 July 1894 Altdorf, Elsaß-Lothringen, German Empire (current day Altorf, Bas-Rhin, France)
- Died: 15 July 1933 (aged 39) 16th arrondissement of Paris, France

Champ Car career
- 1 race run over 1 year
- First race: 1923 Indianapolis 500 (Indianapolis)
Wins	Podiums	Poles
0	0	0

Marie Jean Pierre de Vizcaya Laurent (5 July 1894 – 15 July 1933) was a Spanish racing driver.

== Career ==
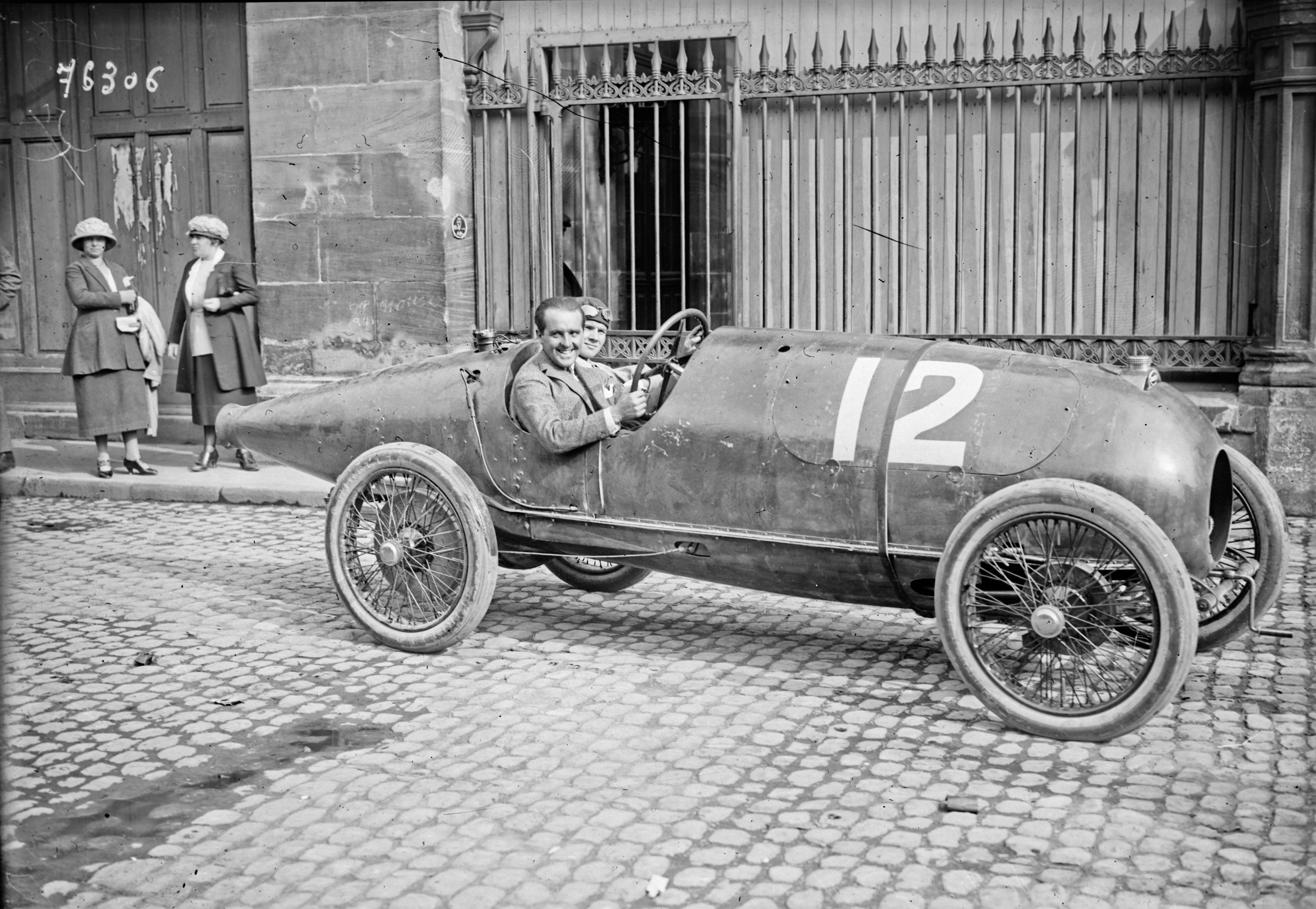
At the 1922 French Grand Prix

Pierre de Vizcaya was born in 1894 at the Château du Jägerhof, the family's large estate in Alsace, at the time part of Germany. He was an early funder for Ettore Bugatti and spent most of his career driving the marque's cars. The family was a racing family, brother Ferdinand also becoming a Grand Prix driver.

De Vizcaya made his racing debut in the Coupe des Voiturettes in 1920, which took place near Le Mans; he set the fastest laps but was disqualified after an illegal pit-stop. He was runner-up in the 1921 Gran Premio delle Vetturette, held at Brescia, team orders placing him behind team-mate Ernest Friderich (who had lost time with a puncture) – the Bugatti Type 22 model, which filled the first four places, was afterwards termed the Brescia Bugatti.

His first Grande Epreuve was the 1922 French Grand Prix, in the Bugatti Type 30 with aerodynamic bodywork, and he finished 2nd, albeit an hour behind Felice Nazzaro. Later in the season he finished third in the Italian Grand Prix. A change in the formula for the Indianapolis 500 before the 1923 season meant the T30 was now compliant with the race regulations, and the Argentine racer Martin de Alzaga entered three Bugattis, one of which was entrusted to de Vizcaya, who retired after 166 laps.

He was an early adopter of a crash helmet, wearing one for the first time for the 1925 French Grand Prix, in which he finished 7th driving a Bugatti Type 35. His greatest achievement was leading the 1926 French Grand Prix for the first half of the race; however, there had only been 3 starters. He retired from racing after the event and became a coachbuilder.

== Death ==
De Vizcaya died in a road accident in the Bois de Boulogne in Paris, on 15 July 1933; he was thrown out of a car being driven by Carlo Felice Trossi, reportedly when trying to retrieve a pet dog which was in the process of jumping out, although contemporary reports suggested the car was in collision with one being driven by a Parisian hotelier.

== Motorsport career results ==
=== Grand Prix results ===
- 1922: 2nd, French Grand Prix; 3rd, Italian Grand Prix
- 1923: ret, French Grand Prix
- 1924: ret, French (European) Grand Prix
- 1925: 4th, Targa Florio; 7th, French Grand Prix
- 1926: ret, French Grand Prix

=== Indianapolis 500 results ===
Year	Car	Start	Qual	Rank	Finish	Laps	Led	Retired
1923	18	6	90.300	19	12	166	0	Rod
Totals						166	0	

Starts	1
Poles	0
Front Row	0
Wins	0
Top 5	0
Top 10	0
Retired	1
