= List of 1926 motorsport champions =

1926 motorsport champions
Previous: 1925	Next: 1927

This list of 1926 motorsport champions is a list of national or international auto racing series with a Championship decided by the points or positions earned by a driver from multiple races.

== Open wheel racing ==
Series	Champion	Season article
AIACR World Manufacturers' Championship	(France) Bugatti	1926 Grand Prix season
AAA National Championship	(United States) Harry Hartz	1926 AAA Championship Car season

== See also ==
- List of motorsport championships
- Auto racing
