= List of 1921 motorsport champions =

1921 motorsport champions
Previous: 1920	Next: 1922

This list of 1921 motorsport champions is a list of national or international auto racing series with a Championship decided by the points or positions earned by a driver from multiple races.

== Open wheel racing ==
Series	Driver	Season article
AAA National Championship	(United States) Tommy Milton	1921 AAA Championship Car season

== See also ==
- List of motorsport championships
- Auto racing
