= Bunker Spreckels =

American surfer

- Born: Adolph Bernard Spreckels III; August 15, 1949; Los Angeles County, California, U.S.
- Died: January 7, 1977 (aged 27); Honolulu, Hawaii, U.S.
- Resting place: Forest Lawn Memorial Park, Glendale, California
- Known for: Surfing
- Parent(s): Kay Williams; Adolph Bernard Spreckels II
- Relatives: Clark Gable (stepfather); Claus Spreckels (great-grandfather)

Bunker Spreckels (born Adolph Bernard Spreckels III; August 15, 1949 – January 7, 1977) was an American surfer and an early pioneer of a surfboard design.

He was the great-grandson of German-born sugar baron Claus Spreckels and was heir to the Spreckels Sugar fortune. Spreckels became the stepson of Clark Gable when his mother married the actor.

Spreckels met surf photographer Art Brewer in 1969 at the surf spot known as Banzai Pipeline while Brewer was on a three-month photo shoot for Surfer magazine.

== Early life ==
Spreckels was born in Los Angeles County, California. His mother was Kay Spreckels (née Kathleen Williams), a former fashion model and actress. His father was sugar-refining heir Adolph B. Spreckels son Adolph Bernard Spreckels, Jr. (1911–61), a prize-winning polo player. Clark Gable was his stepfather.

== Later years ==
Bunker inherited his family fortune on his 21st birthday.

== Death ==
Bunker died of a morphine overdose on January 7, 1977, at the age of 27.

He was interred at Forest Lawn Memorial Park in Glendale, California.

== See also ==
Spreckels family
