= Kay Williams =

American actress (1916-1983)

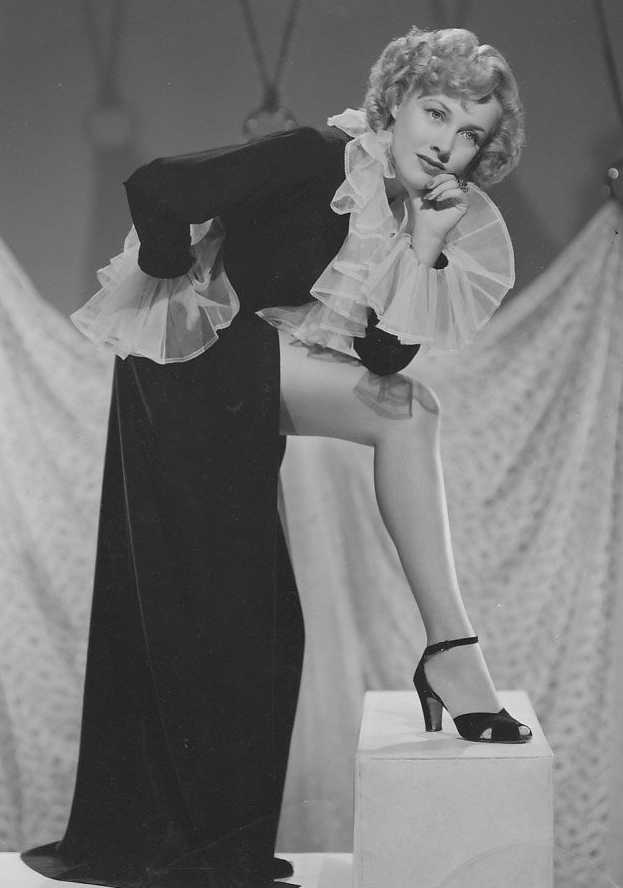
- Williams in a 1943 studio photo
- Born: Kathleen Gretchen Williams; August 7, 1916; Erie, Pennsylvania, U.S.
- Died: May 25, 1983 (aged 66); Houston, Texas, U.S.
- Burial place: Forest Lawn Memorial Park (Glendale)
- Occupation: Actress
- Years active: 1943–1953
- Spouses: Charles Parker Capps (m. 1937; div. 1939) Martín de Álzaga (m. 1942; div. 1943) Adolph Bernard Spreckels II (m. 1945; div. 1952) Clark Gable (m. 1955; died 1960)
- Children: 3

Kathleen Gretchen "Kay" Williams Gable (August 7, 1916 – May 25, 1983) was an American actress. She appeared in numerous uncredited bit parts throughout the 1940s before playing Hazel Dawn in George Cukor's The Actress (1953).

== Career ==
Williams was placed under contract with Metro-Goldwyn-Mayer in 1943 but appeared in uncredited bit parts for the remainder of the decade.

== Personal life ==
Williams was married four times. Her first marriage to Charles Capps lasted from 1937 to 1939, after which she was married to Martín de Álzaga, an Argentine cattle tycoon, from 1942 to 1943. She was married to Adolph Bernard Spreckels II, a sugar heir, from 1945 until 1952, with whom she had two children (including Bunker Spreckels). Williams was married to actor Clark Gable from 1955 until his death in 1960. The couple had one child, a son, who was born after his father's death.

== Death ==
Williams, who had battled heart ailments during her life, left California to receive treatment at Methodist Hospital in Houston, where she died of heart failure on May 25, 1983.

== Filmography ==
Year	Title	Role	Notes
1943	Du Barry Was a Lady	Miss May	Uncredited
1943	Swing Fever	First Receptionist / Music Publisher	Uncredited
1943	Girl Crazy	Showgirl	Uncredited
1943	Whistling in Brooklyn	Office Girl	Uncredited
1943	A Guy Named Joe	Girl at Bar	Uncredited
1944	Rationing	Information Girl	Uncredited
1944	Two Girls and a Sailor	Dream Girl	Uncredited
1944	Meet the People	Showgirl	Uncredited
1944	Marriage Is a Private Affair	Pretty Girl	Uncredited
1944	Thirty Seconds Over Tokyo	Girl in Officers' Club	Uncredited
1945	This Man's Navy		Uncredited
1945	Ziegfeld Follies	Ziegfeld Girl	Sketch: "Number Please"; uncredited
1947	The Other Love	Florist's Assistant	Uncredited
1948	Arch of Triumph	Mrs. Green	Uncredited
1948	No Minor Vices	Receptionist	Uncredited
1953	The Actress	Hazel Dawn	
