= Harlan Fengler =

American racing driver (1903–1981)

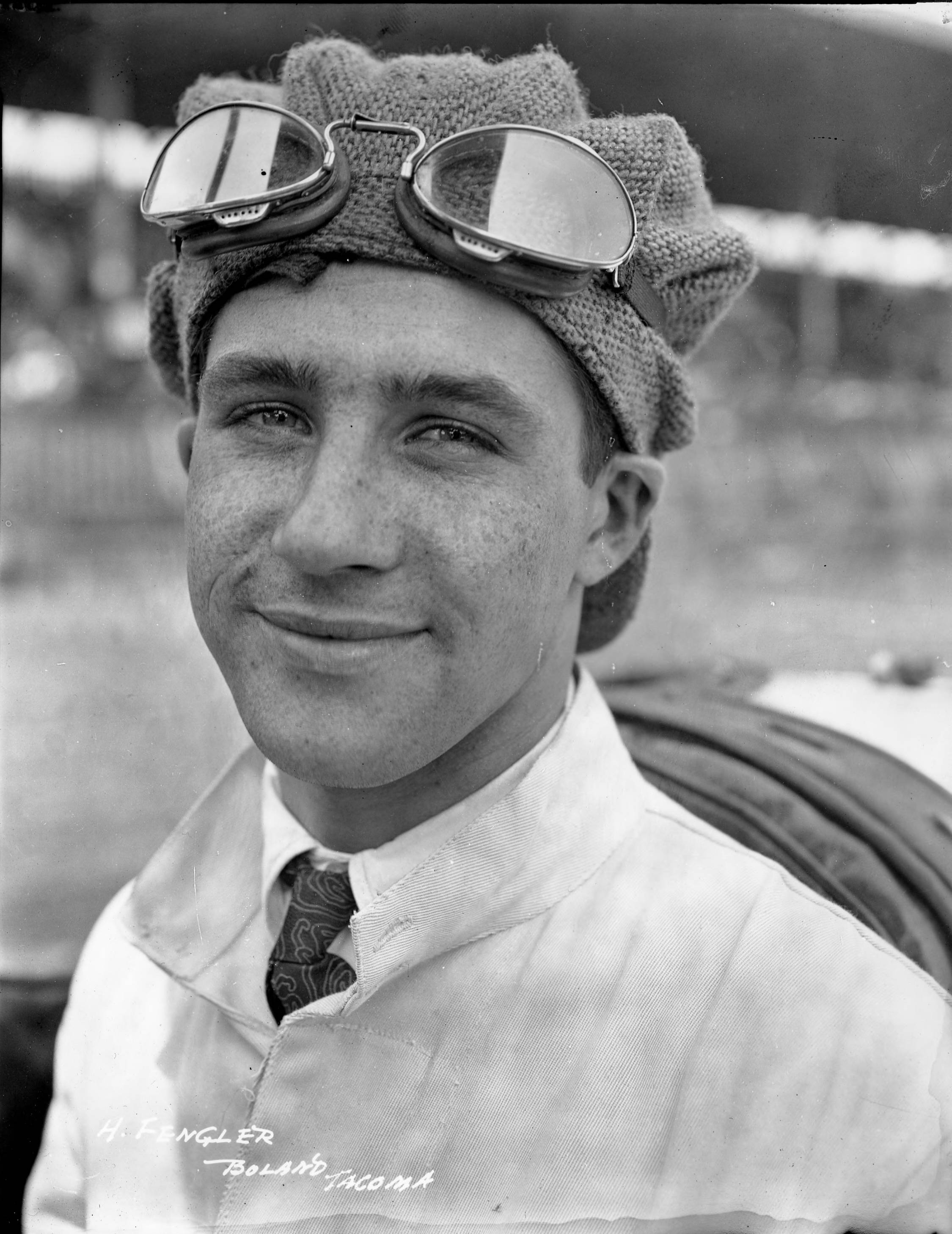
- Fengler at Tacoma Speedway, circa 1922
- Born: March 1, 1903 Chicago, Illinois, U.S.
- Died: March 26, 1981 (aged 78) New Lebanon, Ohio, U.S.

Champ Car career
- 19 races run over 4 years
- Best finish: 6th (1923)
- First race: 1923 Indianapolis 500 (Indianapolis)
- Last race: 1927 Culver City 250 (Culver City)
- First win: 1923 Kansas City 250 #2 (Kansas City)
- Last win: 1924 Beverly Hills 250 (Beverly Hills)
| Wins | Podiums | Poles |
|---|---|---|
| 2 | 3 | 1 |

Harlan Fengler (March 1, 1903 – March 26, 1981) was an American racing driver and official. He was a successful board track racer during the 1920s, and later acted as Chief Steward of the Indianapolis Motor Speedway.

During his career, Fengler was considered a "boy wonder," and among others, drove for entertainer and entrepreneur George L. Wade. He later lived in New Lebanon, Ohio, and acted as Chief Steward of the Indianapolis Motor Speedway from 1958 until 1974.

== Motorsports career results ==
=== Indianapolis 500 results ===
| Year | Car | Start | Qual | Rank | Finish | Laps | Led | Retired |
|---|---|---|---|---|---|---|---|---|
| 1923 | 26 | 19 | 90.750 | 17 | 16 | 69 | 0 | Gas tank |
| Totals | | | | | | 69 | 0 | |

| Starts | 1 |
| Poles | 0 |
| Front Row | 0 |
| Wins | 0 |
| Top 5 | 0 |
| Top 10 | 0 |
| Retired | 1 |
