= Stefan Fengler =

German footballer

Personal information
- Date of birth: 2 April 1968 (age 58)
- Place of birth: Dortmund, Germany
- Height: 1.78 m (5 ft 10 in)
- Position: Defender

Senior career*
Years	Team	Apps	(Gls)
1988–1993	SV Holzwickede		
1993–1996	Borussia Dortmund II		
1996–1999	SG Wattenscheid 09		
1999–2006	LR Ahlen		
2006–2007	Rot Weiss Ahlen	32	(2)
- * Club domestic league appearances and goals

Stefan Fengler (born 2 April 1968) is a German former professional footballer who played as a defender.
