= Max Sailer =

German racing driver (1882–1964)

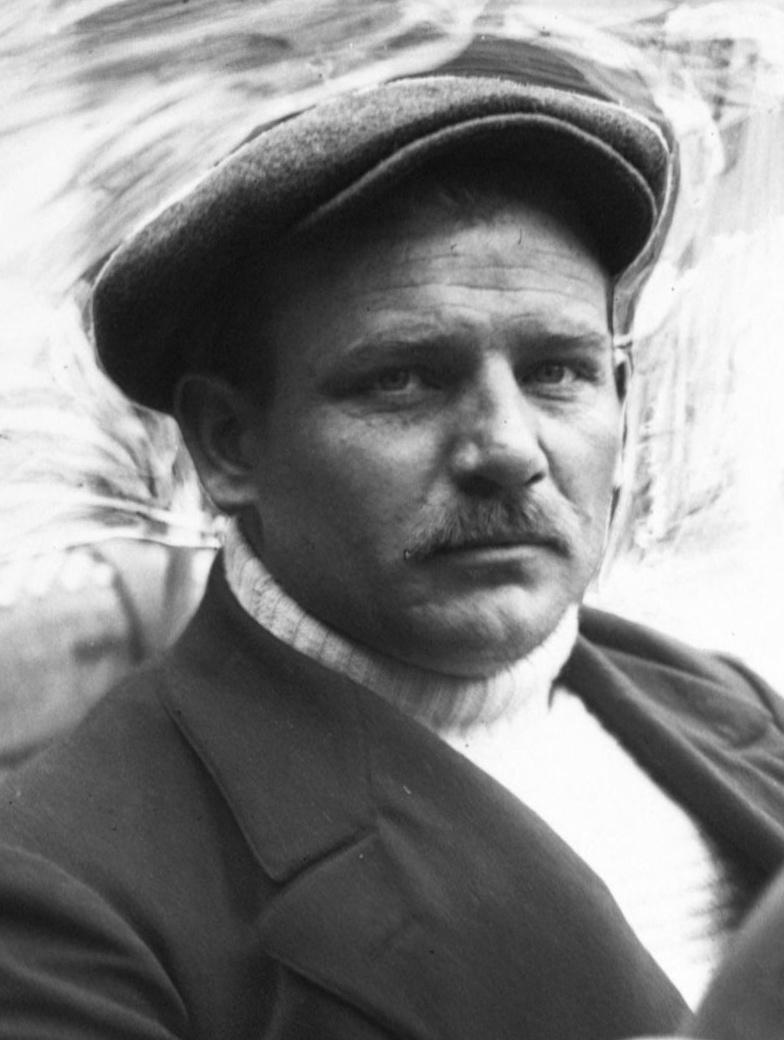
- Sailer at the 1914 French Grand Prix
- Born: 20 December 1882 Esslingen am Neckar, Württemberg, German Empire
- Died: 5 February 1964 (aged 81) Esslingen am Neckar, Baden-Württemberg, Germany

Champ Car career
- 1 race run over 1 year
- Best finish: 19th (1923)
- First race: 1923 Indianapolis 500 (Indianapolis)
Wins	Podiums	Poles
0	0	0

Max Sailer (20 December 1882 – 5 February 1964) was a German racing driver.

== Biography ==
Sailer was born in Esslingen. Prior to World War II he headed Mercedes' racing efforts, later retiring to become a technical director of the firm. He died in his native town of Esslingen, aged 81.

== Motorsports career results ==
=== Indianapolis 500 results ===
Year	Car	Start	Qual	Rank	Finish	Laps	Led	Retired
1923	15	20	90.550	18	8	200	0	Running
Totals						200	0	

Starts	1
Poles	0
Front Row	0
Wins	0
Top 5	0
Top 10	1
Retired	0
