= Prince de Cystria =

French racing driver (1898–1943)

Bertrand Lucinge
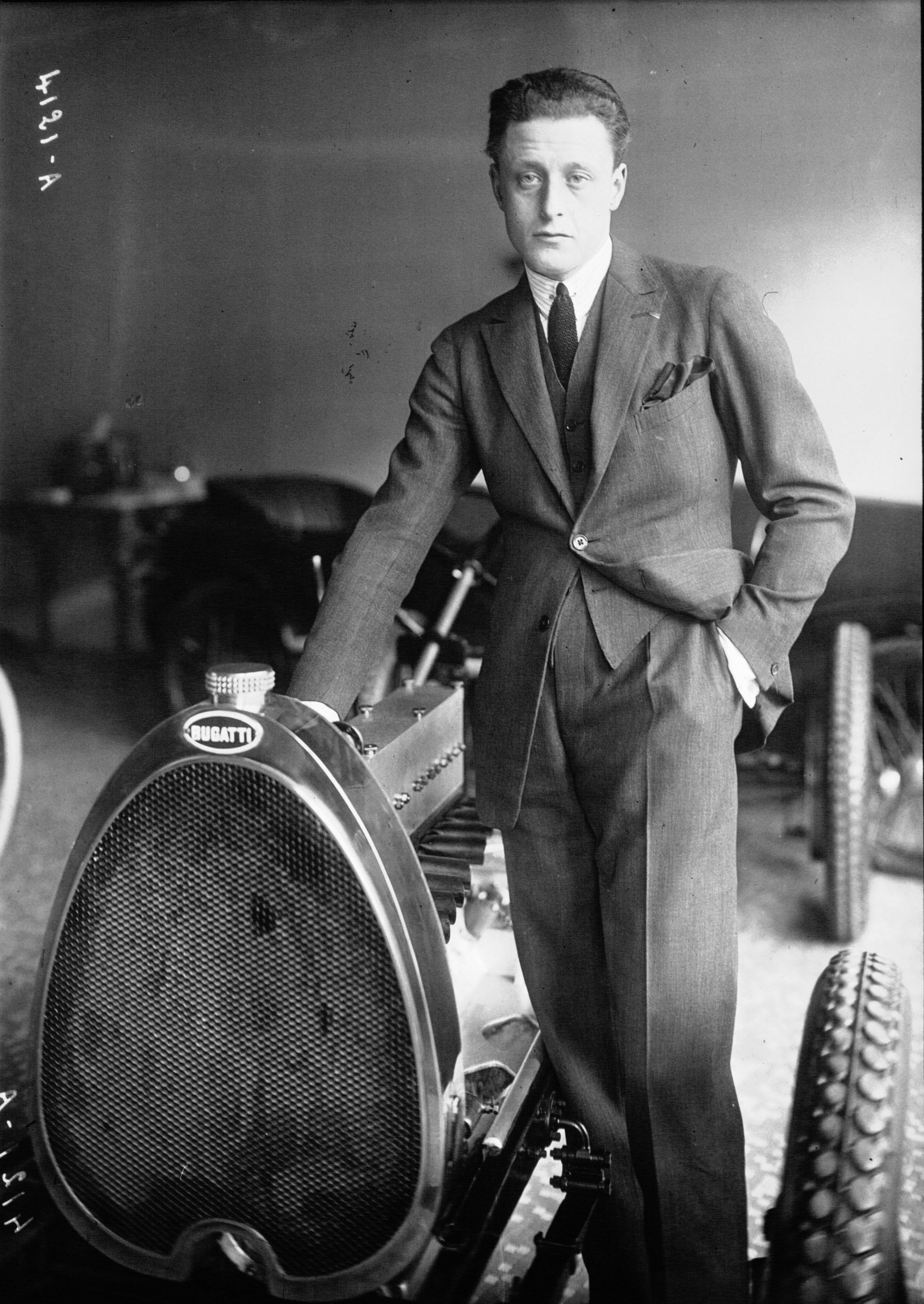
- Lucinge, circa 1923
- Born: Bertrand Marie Ponce François; Raphaël de Faucigny-Lucinge et Coligny; 13 December 1898 7th arrondissement of Paris, France
- Died: 22 February 1943 (aged 44) 11th arrondissement of Paris, German-occupied France

Champ Car career
- 1 race run over 1 year
- Best finish: 15th (1923)
- First race: 1923 Indianapolis 500 (Indianapolis)
Wins	Podiums	Poles
0	0	0

Bertrand Marie Ponce François Raphaël Lucinge (born Bertrand Marie Ponce François Raphaël de Faucigny-Lucinge et Coligny, 13 December 1898 – 22 February 1943) was a French racing driver and playboy. He competed under the nom de course Prince de Cystria.

== Driving career ==
Lucinge made one attempt at the Indianapolis 500 in 1923, recording a top-ten finish.

== Personal life ==
On 28 August 1919, Lucinge married Princess Paule Murat. They divorced in 1926. On 26 December 1927, he married Maria Lydia Hualberta Lloveras.

== Motorsports career results ==
=== Indianapolis 500 results ===
Year	Car	Start	Qual	Rank	Finish	Laps	Led	Retired
1923	19	22	88.900	21	9	200	0	Running
Totals						200	0	

Starts	1
Poles	0
Front Row	0
Wins	0
Top 5	0
Top 10	1
Retired	0
