= 1923 Indianapolis 500 =

American motor race

11th Indianapolis 500
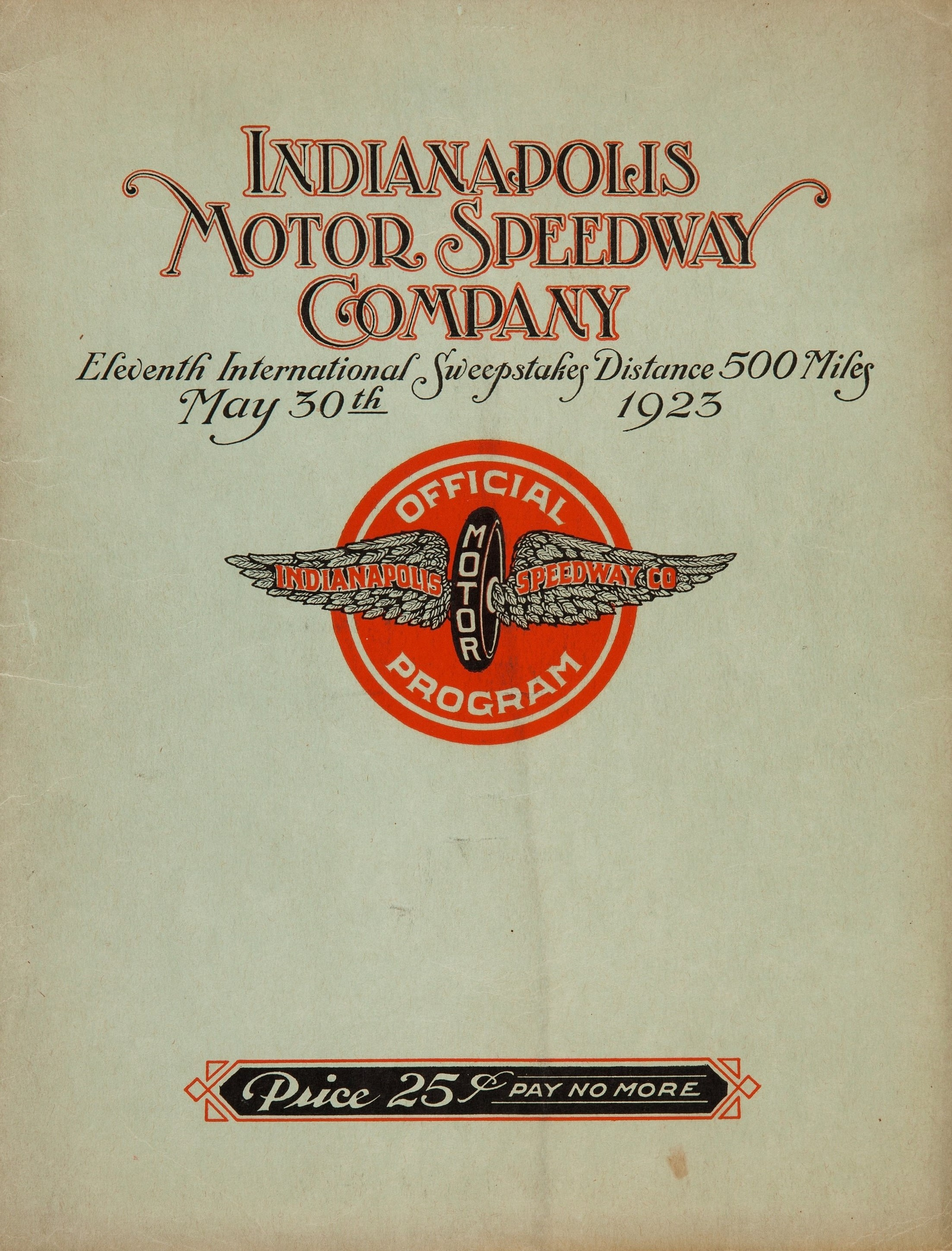

Indianapolis Motor Speedway

Indianapolis 500
- Sanctioning body: AAA
- Date: May 30, 1923
- Winner: Tommy Milton
- Winning Entrant: H.C.S. Motor Car Company
- Winning Chief Mechanic: George Stiehl
- Winning time: 5:29:50.17
- Average speed: 90.954 mph (146.376 km/h)
- Pole position: Tommy Milton
- Pole speed: 108.170 mph (174.083 km/h)
- Most laps led: Tommy Milton (128)

Pre-race
- Pace car: Duesenberg
- Pace car driver: Fred Duesenberg
- Starter: Eddie Rickenbacker
- Honorary referee: John Oliver La Gorce
- Estimated attendance: 150,000

Chronology
Previous	Next
1922	1924

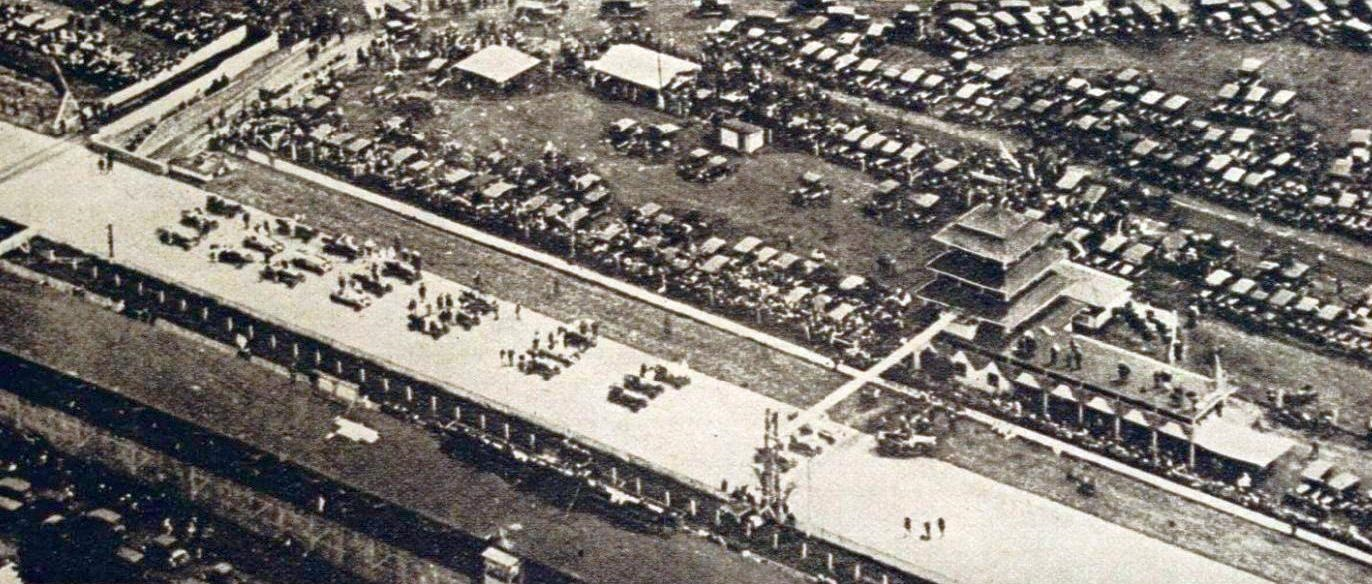
1923 start.

The 11th International 500-Mile Sweepstakes Race was held at the Indianapolis Motor Speedway on Wednesday, May 30, 1923. After winning previously in 1921, Tommy Milton became the first multiple winner of the Indianapolis 500. Howdy Wilcox (the 1919 winner) drove relief for Milton in laps 103–151. During the break, Milton had to have his hands bandaged due to blisters, and changed his shoes due to crimping of his toes.

On lap 22, Tom Alley (driving Earl Cooper's entry) wrecked on the backstretch, going through the wall, and killed 16-year-old spectator Bert Shoup. Alley and two other spectators were injured.

== Memorial Day controversy ==
In January 1923, about four months before the race, the Indiana Legislature passed a bill prohibiting commercialized sporting events, including the Indianapolis 500, from being held on Memorial Day. At the time, Memorial Day was a fixed-date holiday (May 30). Some veterans groups, and proponents of the measure, led by senator Robert L. Moorhead, were displeased with the way the holiday had become "...a day for games, races, and revelry, instead of a day of memory and tears". The bill sparked a heated debate, whereby the local American Legion issued a public proclamation opposing the law, on the grounds of free expression, and being "un-American" in principle.

The issue created a potential schedule shake-up, which could have moved the race to the proceeding Saturday (May 26), or forced an outright cancellation. Speedway management was leery about permanently moving the race to a Saturday, since many spectators worked on Saturdays, and they preferred to have the race on a holiday. Racing on Sunday was also strongly opposed by management at the time. Officials in the city of Indianapolis even proposed making the Saturday before Memorial Day a city holiday, to ensure the race was held on a holiday. On March 5, after consulting legal experts, Governor Warren T. McCray vetoed the bill, calling it "class legislation" and therefore unconstitutional.

In subsequent years, the Indianapolis 500 would be held on Memorial Day (May 30) regardless of the day of the week through 1970. The only exceptions were when May 30 fell on a Sunday. In those cases, the race was held on Monday May 31 (the observed holiday). Memorial Day ceased to be a fixed-date holiday after the passage of the Uniform Monday Holiday Act, which took effect in 1971. The race moved permanently to Sunday starting in 1974.

== Time trials ==
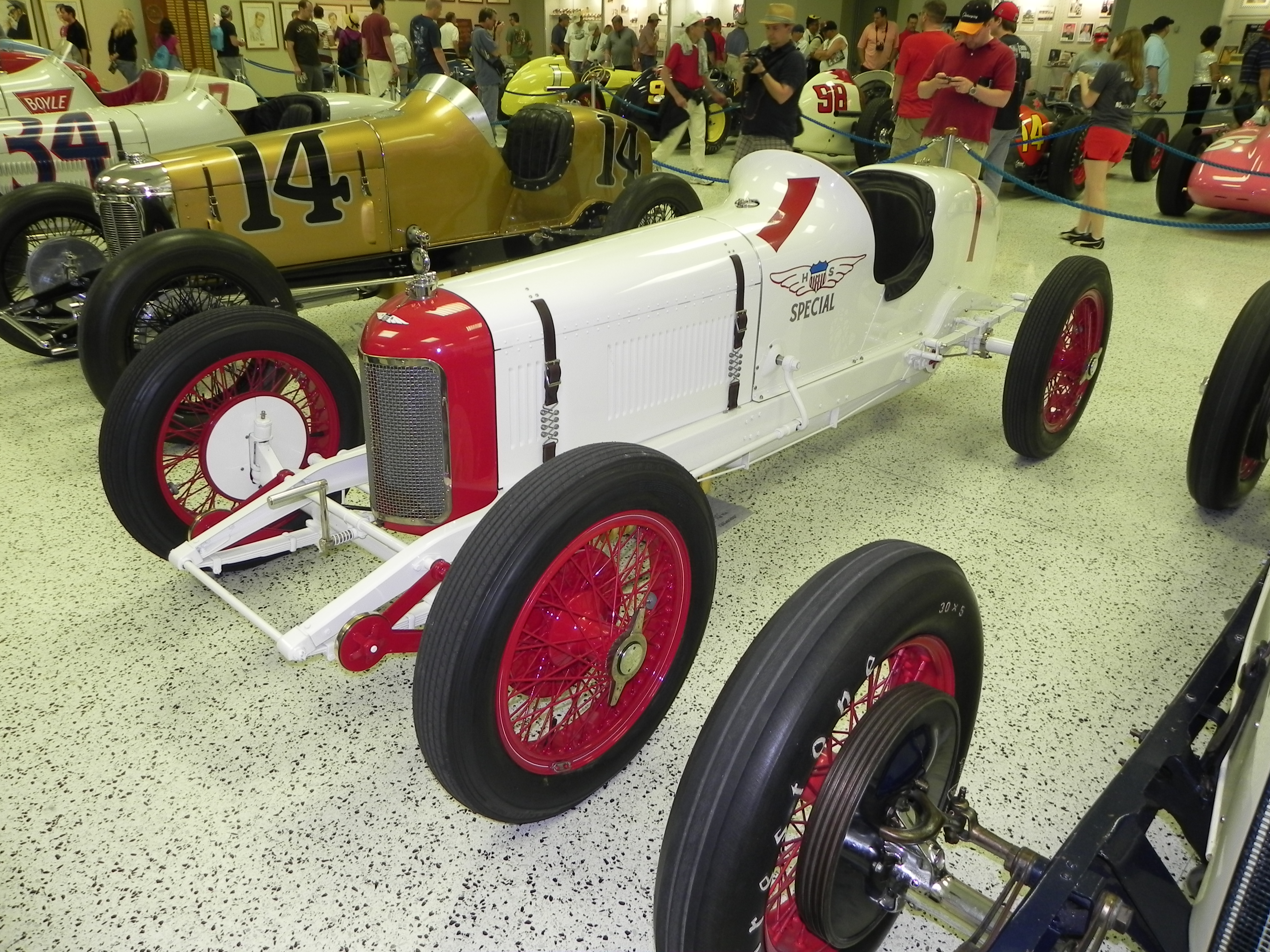
Milton's winning car

Four-lap (10 mile) qualifying runs were utilized. Tommy Milton won the pole with a record speed of over 108 mph. Five cars qualified with average speeds of over 100 mph.

== Starting grid ==
Row	Inside		Middle		Outside	
1	1	(United States) Tommy Milton W	7	(United States) Harry Hartz	3	(United Kingdom) Dario Resta W
2	21	(Argentina) Martín de Álzaga R	27	(United Kingdom) Louis Zborowski R	18	(Spain) Pierre de Vizcaya R
3	23	(United States) L. L. Corum	25	(United States) Howdy Wilcox W	5	(United States) Jimmy Murphy W
4	8	(United States) Cliff Durant	2	(United States) Ralph DePalma W	29	(United States) Earl Cooper
5	4	(United States) Joe Boyer	6	(United States) Eddie Hearne	16	(Germany) Christian Werner R
6	31	(United States) Frank Elliott	14	(Germany) Christian Lautenschlager R	35	(United States) Bennett Hill
7	26	(United States) Harlan Fengler R	15	(Germany) Max Sailer R	28	(United States) Leon Duray
8	19	(France) Prince de Cystria R	22	(Argentina) Raúl Riganti R	34	(United States) Wade Morton R

R Indianapolis 500 rookie
W Indianapolis 500 winner

== Box score ==
Finish	Start	No	Name	Entrant	Car	Qual	Rank	Laps	Status
1	1	1	(United States) Tommy Milton W (Howdy Wilcox Laps 103–151)	H.C.S. Motor Company	Miller	108.170	1	200	90.955 mph
2	2	7	(United States) Harry Hartz	R. Cliff Durant	Miller	103.700	3	200	+3:15.73
3	9	5	(United States) Jimmy Murphy W	R. Cliff Durant	Miller	104.050	2	200	+10:46.47
4	14	6	(United States) Eddie Hearne (Earl Cooper 88–200)	R. Cliff Durant	Miller	97.300	9	200	+16:24.06
5	7	23	(United States) L. L. Corum	Barber-Warnock	Fronty-Ford T	86.650	23	200	+33:26.64
6	16	31	(United States) Frank Elliott (Dave Lewis Laps 109–138)	R. Cliff Durant	Miller	93.250	12	200	+35:02.70
7	10	8	(United States) Cliff Durant (Eddie Hearne Laps 98–116) (Eddie Hearne Laps 149–200)	R. Cliff Durant	Miller	102.650	4	200	+35:16.13
8	20	15	(Germany) Max Sailer R (Karl Sailer Laps 73–200)	Daimler Motoren Gesellschaft	Mercedes	90.550	18	200	+41:59.43
9	22	19	(France) Prince de Cystria R	Prince de Cystria	Bugatti	88.900	21	200	+56:34.61
10	24	34	(United States) Wade Morton R (Jerry Wunderlich Laps 30–53) (Thane Houser) (Phil Shafer Laps 65–87) (Jerry Wunderlich Laps 88–100) (Ora Haibe Laps 101–160) (Phil Shafer Laps 172–200)	Duesenberg Brothers	Duesenberg	88.000	22	200	+1:10:14.81
11	15	16	(Germany) Christian Werner R (Max Sailer Laps 84–87) (Max Sailer Laps 112–126) (Christian Lautenschlager)	Daimler Motoren Gesellschaft	Mercedes	95.200	11	200	+1:12:00.34
12	6	18	(Spain) Pierre de Vizcaya R	Martín de Álzaga	Bugatti	90.300	19	165	Rod
13	21	28	(United States) Leon Duray (Lou Wilson Laps 133–136)	R. Cliff Durant	Miller	89.900	20	136	Rod
14	3	3	(United Kingdom) Dario Resta W (Ernie Ansterburg Laps 71–80) (Joe Boyer Laps 81–88)	Packard Motor Car Company	Packard	98.020	8	88	Differential
15	11	2	(United States) Ralph DePalma W (Ernie Ansterburg)	Packard Motor Car Company	Packard	100.420	5	69	Head gasket
16	19	26	(United States) Harlan Fengler R (Lou Wilson Laps 46–69)	R. Cliff Durant	Miller	90.750	17	69	Gas tank
17	8	25	(United States) Howdy Wilcox W	H.C.S. Motor Company	Miller	81.000	24	60	Clutch
18	13	4	(United States) Joe Boyer	Packard Motor Car Company	Packard	98.800	7	59	Differential
19	18	35	(United States) Bennett Hill (Martín de Álzaga Laps 30–44)	Harry A. Miller	Miller	91.200	16	44	Crankshaft
20	5	27	(United Kingdom) Louis Zborowski R	Count L. Zborowski	Bugatti	91.800	15	41	Rod
21	12	29	(United States) Earl Cooper (Tom Alley Laps 2–21)	R. Cliff Durant	Miller	99.400	6	21	Crash BS
22	23	22	(Argentina) Raúl Riganti R	Martín de Álzaga	Bugatti	95.300	10	19	Gas line
23	17	14	(Germany) Christian Lautenschlager R	Daimler Motoren Gesellschaft	Mercedes	93.200	13	14	Crash T1
24	4	21	(Argentina) Martín de Álzaga R	Martín de Álzaga	Bugatti	92.900	14	6	Rod

Note: Relief drivers in parentheses

W Former Indianapolis 500 winner

R Indianapolis 500 Rookie

=== Race statistics ===
Lap Leaders
Laps	Leader
1–2	Jimmy Murphy
3	Tommy Milton
4	Jimmy Murphy
5	Tommy Milton
6	Jimmy Murphy
7–15	Tommy Milton
16–20	Jimmy Murphy
21–25	Tommy Milton
26	Howdy Wilcox
27	Tommy Milton
28	Howdy Wilcox
29	Jimmy Murphy
30–37	Tommy Milton
38	Jimmy Murphy
39–40	Howdy Wilcox
41–43	Tommy Milton
44–48	Howdy Wilcox
49–52	Tommy Milton
53	Howdy Wilcox
54–62	Tommy Milton
63	Cliff Durant
64	Tommy Milton
65–66	Cliff Durant
67–73	Tommy Milton
74	Cliff Durant
75–103	Tommy Milton
104–109	Harry Hartz
110–150	Howdy Wilcox
151–200	Tommy Milton

Total laps led
Leader	Laps
Tommy Milton	128
Howdy Wilcox	51
Jimmy Murphy	11
Harry Hartz	6
Cliff Durant	4

== Race details ==
- For 1923, riding mechanics were made optional. Only one team (the Mercedes of Christian Lautenschlager) utilized one.
- First alternate: none

Grand Prix Race
Previous race: 1922 Italian Grand Prix	1923 Grand Prix season Grandes Épreuves	Next race: 1923 French Grand Prix
Previous race: 1922 Indianapolis 500	Indianapolis 500	Next race: 1924 Indianapolis 500
