= Raúl Riganti =

Argentine racing driver (1893–1970)

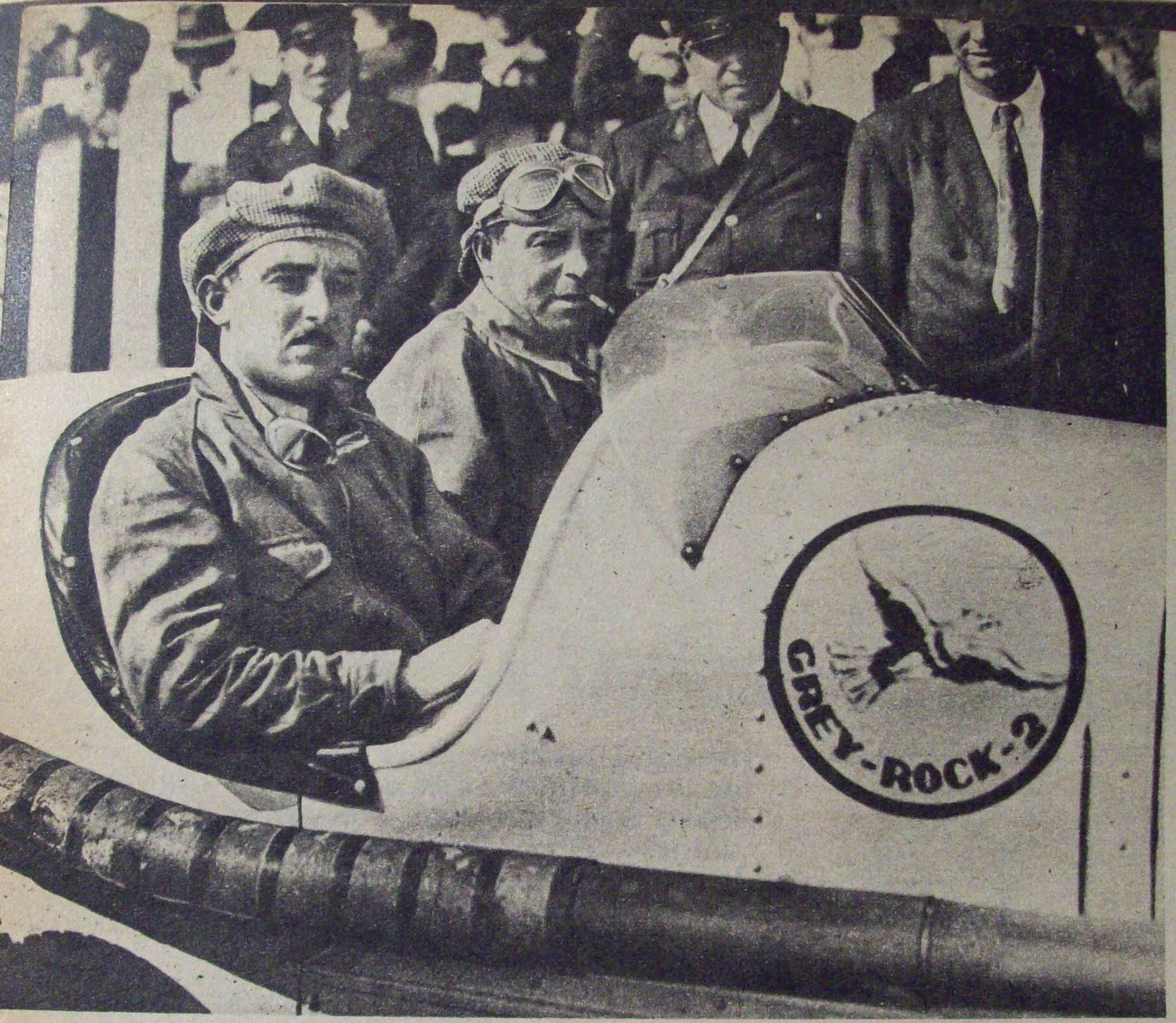
- Riganti (left) with Ernesto Blanco
- Born: 2 February 1893 Buenos Aires, Argentina
- Died: 1 October 1970 (aged 77) Buenos Aires, Argentina

Champ Car career
- 3 races run over 3 years
- First race: 1923 Indianapolis 500 (Indianapolis)
- Last race: 1940 Indianapolis 500 (Indianapolis)
Wins	Podiums	Poles
0	0	0

Raúl Riganti (2 February 1893 – 1 October 1970) was an Argentine racing driver. He competed in the Indianapolis 500 three times, qualifying every year he was entered. Riganti was briefly an adviser of driver Juan Manuel Fangio.

== Motorsports career results ==
=== Indianapolis 500 results ===
Year	Car	Start	Qual	Rank	Finish	Laps	Led	Retired
1923	22	23	95.300	10	22	19	0	Gas line
1933	14	27	108.081	39	14	200	0	Running
1940	29	24	121.827	23	33	24	0	Crash T2
Totals						243	0	

Starts	3
Poles	0
Front Row	0
Wins	0
Top 5	0
Top 10	0
Retired	2
