= Christian Werner =

German racing driver (1892–1932)

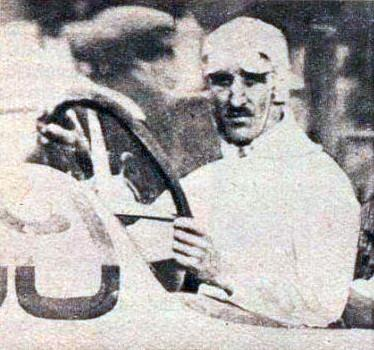
- Werner at the 1924 Targa Florio
- Born: 19 May 1892 Stuttgart, Württemberg, German Empire
- Died: 17 June 1932 (aged 40) Cannstatt, Württemberg, Germany

Champ Car career
- 1 race run over 1 year
- First race: 1923 Indianapolis 500 (Indianapolis)
Wins	Podiums	Poles
0	0	0

24 Hours of Le Mans career
- Years: 1930
- Teams: Caracciola
- Best finish: DNF (1930)
- Class wins: 0

Christian Werner (19 May 1892 – 17 June 1932) was a German racing driver. He won the 1924 Targa Florio.

== Motorsports career results ==
=== Indianapolis 500 results ===
Year	Car	Start	Qual	Rank	Finish	Laps	Led	Retired
1923	16	15	95.200	11	11	200	0	Running
Totals						200	0	

Starts	1
Poles	0
Front Row	0
Wins	0
Top 5	0
Top 10	0
Retired	0
