= Wade Morton =

American racing driver (1889–1935)

- Born: Ward Day; March 19, 1889 Franklinville, New York, U.S.
- Died: February 22, 1935 (aged 45) Winter Haven, Florida, U.S.

Champ Car career
- 17 races run over 6 years
- Best finish: 17th (1923)
- First race: 1922 Beverly Hills 250 #2 (Beverly Hills)
- Last race: 1927 Indianapolis 500 (Indianapolis)
Wins	Podiums	Poles
0	0	0

Wade Morton (born Ward Day, March 19, 1889 – February 22, 1935) was an American racing driver.

Morton competed in 17 American Championship Car races from 1922 to 1927 including seven Indianapolis 500 races (three starts of his own and four drives in relief of others). His best Champ Car finishes were a pair of seventh places on the Beverly Hills and Fresno board ovals in 1923.

Morton was also a test driver for Auburn and an executive for Meteor Motors. He was credited with designing Auburn's Cabin Speedster but it is likely that Albert Leamy did the primary design work. He died in a road vehicle accident.

== Motorsports career results ==
=== Indianapolis 500 results ===
Year	Car	Start	Qual	Rank	Finish	Laps	Led	Retired
1923	34	24	88.000	22	10	200	0	Running
1925	23	16	95.821	20	15	156	0	Crash BS
1927	41	26	108.075	21	14	152	0	Crash
Totals						508	0	

Starts	3
Poles	0
Front Row	0
Wins	0
Top 5	0
Top 10	1
Retired	2
