= Eddie Hearne =

American racing driver (1887–1955)

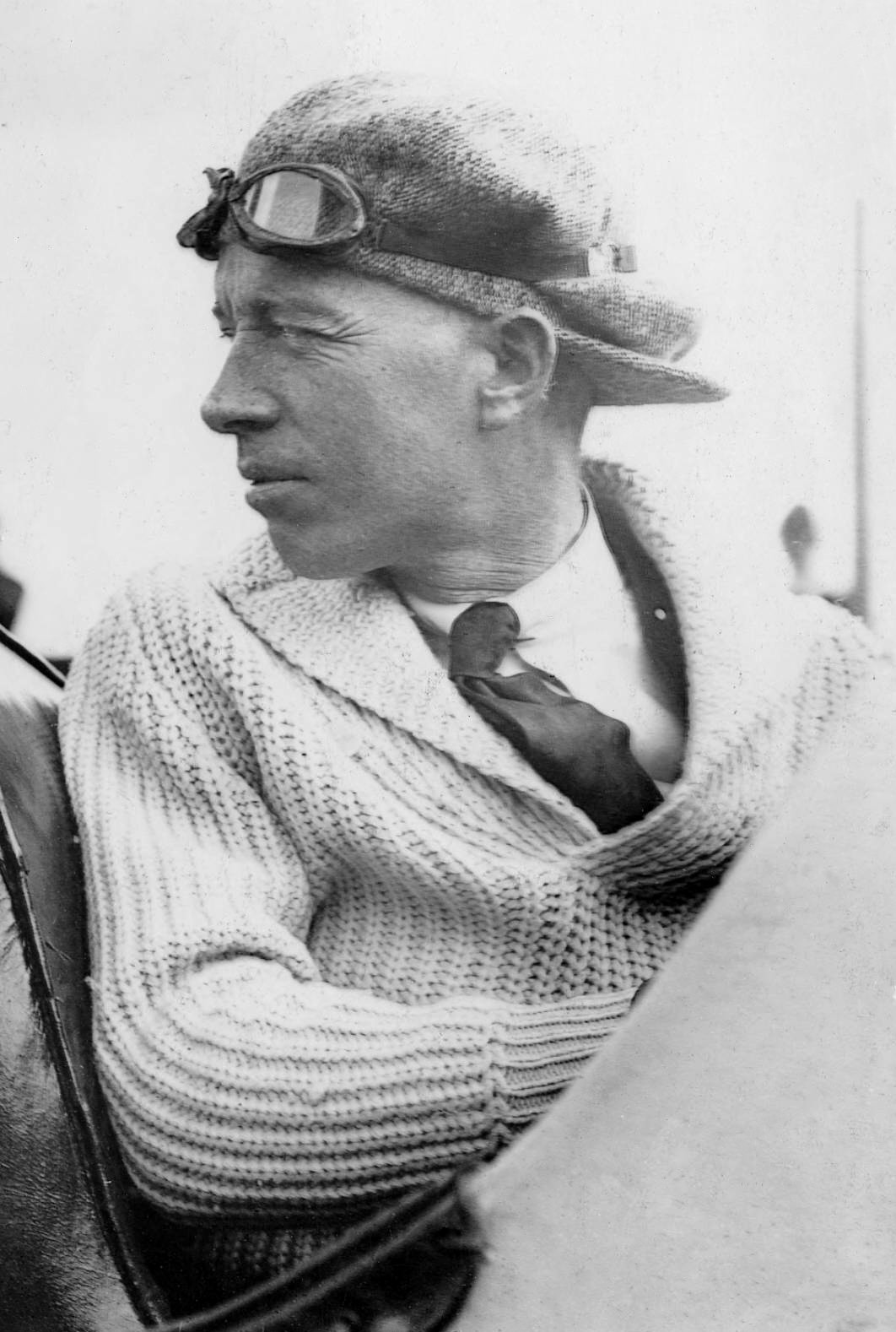
- Hearne, circa 1921
- Born: Edward Ames Hearne; March 1, 1887 Kansas City, Kansas, U.S.
- Died: February 9, 1955 (aged 67) Los Angeles, California, U.S.

Championship titles
- AAA Championship Car (1923)

Champ Car career
- 106 races run over 18 years
- Best finish: 1st (1923)
- First race: 1909 Cobe Trophy (Crown Point)
- Last race: 1927 Charlotte 100 (Charlotte)
- First win: 1910 Indianapolis Race #6 (Indianapolis)
- Last win: 1923 Altoona 200 (Altoona)
Wins	Podiums	Poles
11	43	1

Edward Ames Hearne (March 1, 1887 – February 9, 1955) was an American racing driver from Kansas City, Kansas who was active in the formative years of auto racing.

== Early life ==
Hearne was born on March 1, 1887.

== Racing career ==
Hearne participated in the inaugural Indianapolis 500. He later was a long-time Duesenberg factory-backed driver. Hearne made 106 AAA Championship Car starts and continued driving until 1927, winning 11 Champ Car races and the 1923 National Championship.

== Death ==
Hearne died on February 9, 1955. He was buried in Greenwood Cemetery in Bolivar, Missouri.

== Awards and honors ==
Hearne has been inducted into the following halls of fame:

- Auto Racing Hall of Fame (1964)

== Motorsports career results ==
=== Indianapolis 500 results ===
Year	Car	Start	Qual	Rank	Finish	Laps	Led	Retired
1911	18	16	—	6	21	126	0	Flagged
1912	6	5	81.850	10	20	55	0	Burned bearing
1919	14	8	94.500	19	2	200	0	Running
1920	31	9	88.050	15	6	200	0	Running
1921	1	4	96.180	6	13	111	0	Oil line
1922	15	23	95.600	13	3	200	0	Running
1923	6	14	97.300	9	4	200	0	Running
1924	1	14	99.230	14	19	151	0	Fuel line
1927	16	18	105.115	31	7	200	0	Running
Totals						1443	0	

Starts	9
Poles	0
Front Row	0
Wins	0
Top 5	3
Top 10	5
Retired	3
