= Martín de Álzaga (racing driver) =

Argentine racing driver (1901–1982)

- Born: Martín Máximo Pablo de Álzaga Unzué; 25 January 1901 Mar del Plata, Buenos Aires, Argentina
- Died: 25 November 1982 (aged 81) Buenos Aires, Argentina

Champ Car career
- 1 race run over 1 year
- First race: 1923 Indianapolis 500 (Indianapolis)
Wins	Podiums	Poles
0	0	0

Martín Máximo Pablo de Álzaga Unzué (25 January 1901 – 15 November 1982) was an Argentine racing driver and playboy.

== Personal life ==
De Álzaga was briefly married to model/actress Kay Williams, who would eventually marry and widow actor Clark Gable.

De Álzaga participated in numerous car competitions such as the Carrera de la Milla, the Carrera Internacional Montevideo/Punta del Este, the Gran Premio del Automóvil Club Argentino, the San Sebastián Grand Prix and the Indianapolis 500. He was one of the few Argentines who participated in the latter sporting event. In 1924, he held the first midget race in Buenos Aires, using the dirt roads surrounding Plaza Arenales as a circuit. He would then bring a group of eccentric drivers from Europe who had been racing since 1910 in what were called cyclecars. That same year, he won the Gran Prix I Coupe de l’Autodrome de Fórmula Libre, in Miramas (France), driving a Sunbeam.

De Álzaga died in Buenos Aires and is buried at the La Recoleta Cemetery.

== Motorsports career results ==
=== Indianapolis 500 results ===
Year	Car	Start	Qual	Rank	Finish	Laps	Led	Retired
1923	21	4	92.900	14	24	6	0	Rod
Totals						6	0	

Starts	1
Poles	0
Front Row	0
Wins	0
Top 5	0
Top 10	0
Retired	1
