= Franz Heim (racing driver) =

German car manufacturer and racing driver (1882–1926)

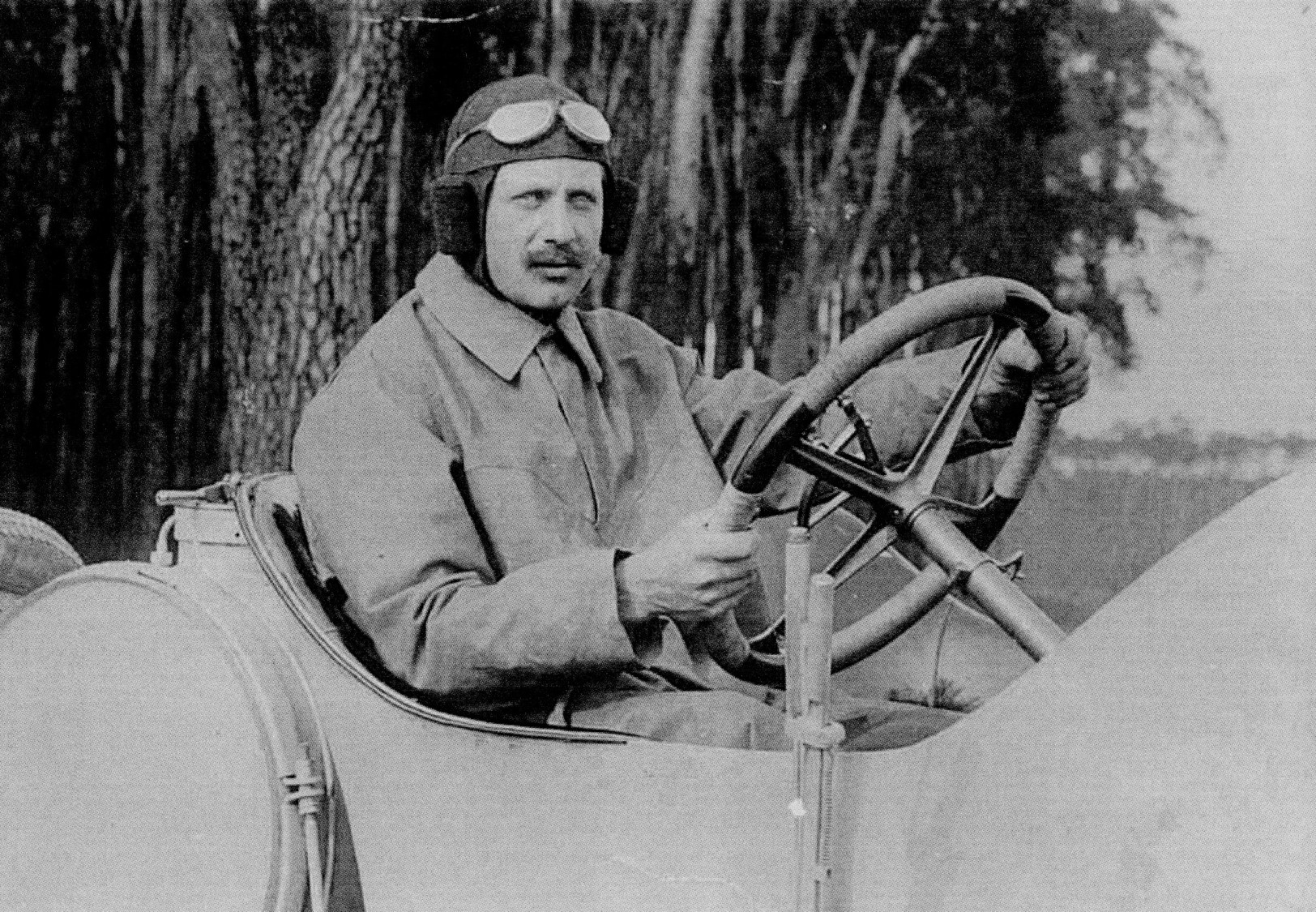
- With the Prinz Heinrich Benz in 1910
- Born: 4 July 1882 Wiesbaden, Germany
- Died: 6 January 1926 (aged 43) Mannheim, Germany

Franz Heim (4 July 1882 – 6 January 1926) was a German car producer and racing driver, active in the sport either side of the First World War.

== Benz career ==
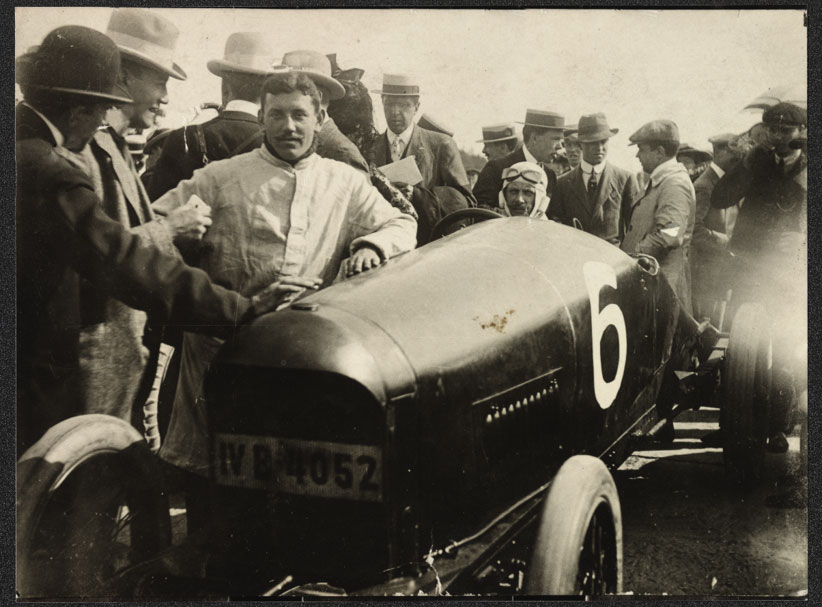
Franz Heim driving a Prinz Heinrich Benz 1910 at the August Sprint Races in Brooklands

In 1896, when he was 14 years old, Heim became only the second apprentice recruited by Karl Benz, and in 1907 was chosen as the riding mechanic for René Hanriot at the Grand Prix that year; he was also Hanriot's mechanic at the 1908 Savannah races in the United States. For the 1910 American Grand Prize he was moved over to sit with Victor Hemery, and was also Barney Oldfield's riding mechanic when driving his Blitzen Benz.

He made an impromptu Grande Epreuve debut at the wheel of a Benz at the 1910 Vanderbilt Cup, after George Robertson - for whom he was meant to be riding mechanic - was injured in practice. Heim stood out because of his "funny pink suit" and his unexpected debut ended with a fire on lap 6 at the Westbury turn; although Heim and his "mecanicien" were unharmed, the car was destroyed. He had however undertaken enough of an apprenticeship to be given more drives, including winning the 1911 Ries hillclimb in a Blitzen Benz (Heim claiming he did not need to drive at the car's full potential to set a new record), and taking part in races at Brooklands in 1910 in a Benz built for the Prinz-Heinrich-Fahrt. Heim took a particularly fastidious and exacting approach to preparation, which did not find favour either with L. G. Hornsted (who ran Benz' operations in England) or the American Benz mechanics.

== Formation of Heim & Cie ==
After Benz withdrew from racing in 1911, Baron de Turckheim recruited most of the Benz team, including Héméry, Hanriot, and Heim, for Lorraine-Dietrich; Heim started his own workshop to produce what were, in effect, Benz copies for the Baron. He formed a new company - Badische Automobilfabrik Heim & Cie. - with wealthy amateur driver Art Henney in Lindenhofstrasse in 1920, employing former Benz workers, building cars using the Selve engine; the first models, which appeared in September 1921, included the 6 cylinder 20hp model and an 8 cylinder 30hp model. The company's first race appearance came at the first race at the Avus in 1921.

== Grand Prix car ==
In 1922, the company built a Grand Prix car, using an engine Heim had himself developed, at a new factory in Schanzenstraße, and the factory entered the 1922 Italian Grand Prix at the new Monza circuit. Heim had designed a low-slung car to cutdown on wind resistance, with the mandatory spare tyre being placed horizontally on the tail. However, the straight six 1,995cc engine only provided 80 horsepower, which kept its maximum speed well below those of the leading Fiat 804s. The race duly proved disastrous - the two Heims, driven by Heim himself and Reinhold Stahl, both retired, having been lapped on average on every other lap.

== Final years ==
With the downturn in the market caused by hyperinflation, the Heim company went into receivership in November 1925. On 6 January 1926, unable to see a way out of his financial difficulties, Franz Heim committed suicide.
