= 1922 Italian Grand Prix =

Race details
- Date: 10 September 1922
- Official name: II Gran Premio d'Italia
- Location: Monza, Italy
- Course: Autodromo Nazionale di Monza
- Course length: 10.00 km (6.21 miles)
- Distance: 80 laps, 800 km (500 miles)

Pole position
Driver	(Italy) Felice Nazzaro	Fiat
- Grid positions set by ballot

Fastest lap
Driver	(Italy) Pietro Bordino	Fiat
- Time: 4:05.0

Podium
First	(Italy) Pietro Bordino	Fiat
Second	(Italy) Felice Nazzaro	Fiat
Third	(Spain) Pierre de Vizcaya	Bugatti

The 1922 Italian Grand Prix was a Grand Prix motor race held at Monza on 10 September 1922.

== Classification ==
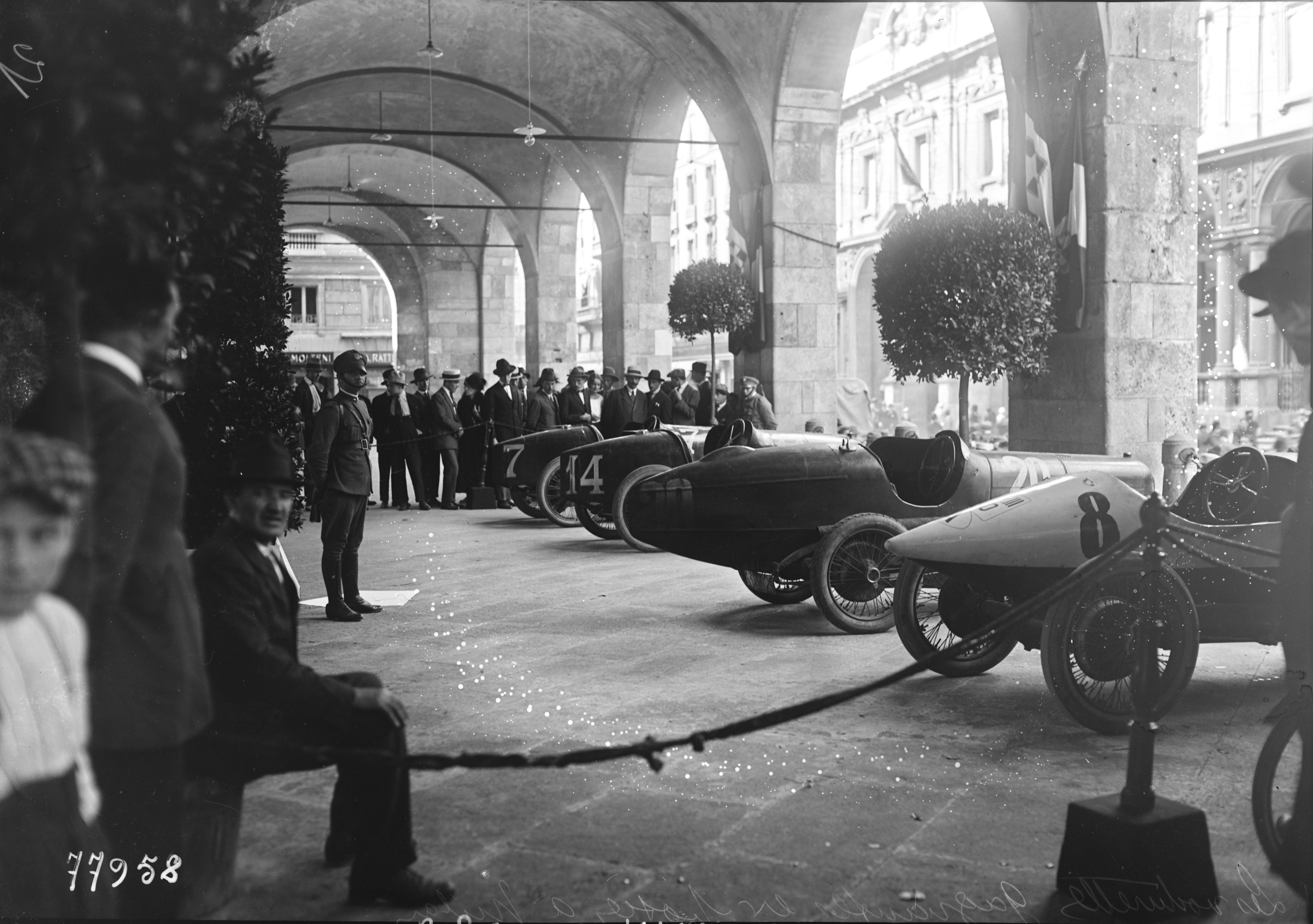
Cars on display before the race

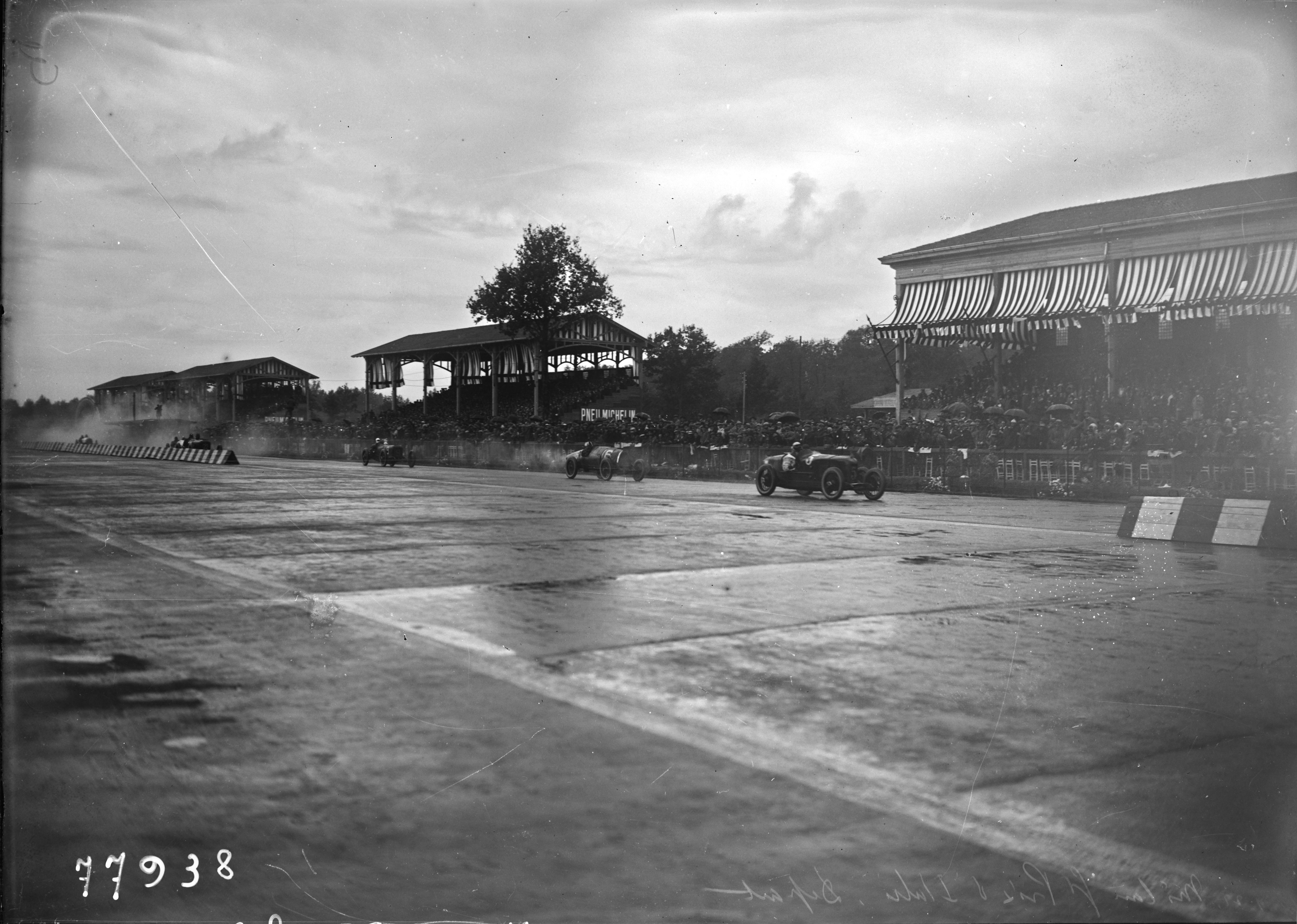
Race start

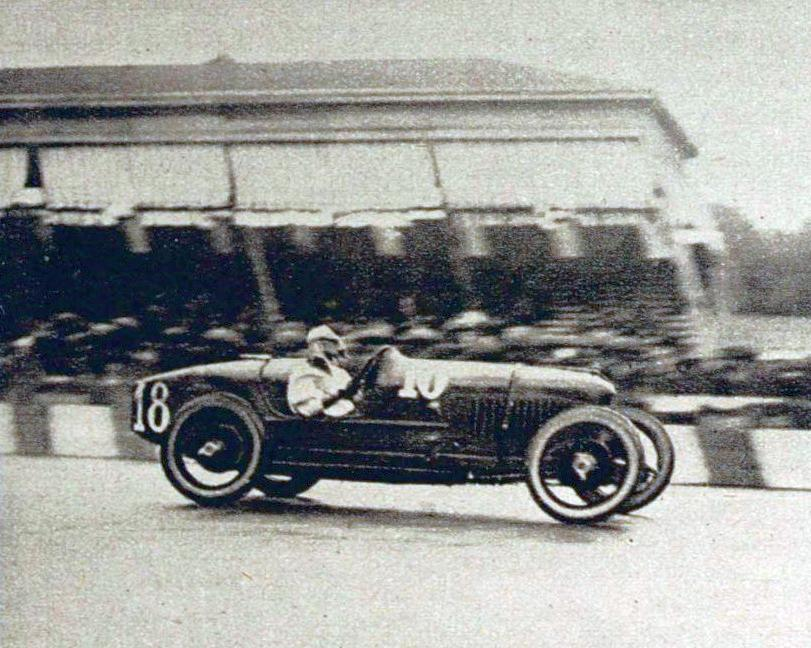
Winner Pietro Bordino in his Fiat

Pos	No	Driver	Car	Laps	Time/Retired
1	18	(Italy) Pietro Bordino	Fiat 804	80	5h43m13
2	5	(Italy) Felice Nazzaro	Fiat 804	80	5h51m35
3	16	(Spain) Pierre de Vizcaya	Bugatti Type 29	76	+ 4 laps
Ret	9	(Italy) Guido Meregalli	Diatto 4DC	52	Mechanical
Ret	22	(Italy) Alfieri Maserati	Diatto 4DC	27	Crash
Ret	20	(Germany) Franz Heim	Heim	16	
Ret	31	(Germany) Reinhold Stahl	Heim	7	
Ret	29	(Italy) Enrico Giaccone	Fiat 804	0	Transmission
DNS	37	(Germany) Gregor Kuhn	Austro-Daimler ADS II-R		Fatal Accident in practice
DNS	8	(Germany) Alfred Neubauer	Austro-Daimler ADS II-R		Entry Withdrawn
DNS	32	(Germany) Lambert Pocher	Austro-Daimler ADS II-R		Entry Withdrawn
DNA	1	(France) Jules Goux	Ballot 2LS		
DNA	2	(France) Jean Chassagne	Sunbeam		
DNA	3	(France) Ernest Friderich	Bugatti Type 29		
DNA	4	(Germany) Max Sailer	Mercedes		
DNA	6	(Italy) Eugenio Silvani	Bianchi 18		
DNA	7	(Germany) Arthur Henney	Heim		
DNA	12	(France) Albert Guyot	Rolland-Pilain A22		
DNA	13	(France) René Thomas	Delage 2LC		
DNA	14	(Italy) Giulio Foresti	Ballot 2LS		
DNA	15	(United Kingdom) Henry Segrave	Sunbeam		
DNA	17	(Germany) Christian Lautenschlager	Mercedes		
DNA	19	(Italy) Meo Costantini	Bianchi 18		
DNA	25	(France) Victor Hémery	Rolland-Pilain A22		
DNA	26	(United Kingdom) Kenelm Lee Guinness	Sunbeam		
DNA	27	(France) Pierre Marco	Bugatti Type 29		
DNA	28	(Germany) Otto Salzer	Mercedes		
DNA	30	(Italy) Caberto Conelli	Bianchi		
DNA	35	(France) Louis Wagner	Rolland-Pilain A22		
DNA	36	(France) Jacques Mones-Maury	Bugatti Type 29		
DNA	39	(France) Jean-Philippe Sadi-le-Cointe	Rolland-Pilain A22		

Grand Prix Race
Previous race: 1922 French Grand Prix	1922 Grand Prix season Grandes Épreuves	Next race: 1923 Indianapolis 500
Previous race: 1921 Italian Grand Prix	Italian Grand Prix	Next race: 1923 Italian Grand Prix
