= Austro-Daimler =

Austrian automaker, 1899–1934

Austro-Daimler AG
- Type: Public
- Industry: Automobile
- Founded: 1899
- Fate: Merged with Steyr Automobile (1934)
- Successor: Steyr-Daimler-Puch
- Headquarters: Wiener Neustadt, Austria
- Key people: Eduard Bierenz, Eduard Fischer, Paul Daimler; Founders
- Products: Cars
- Number of employees: 800 (1906); 4,500 (1914)
- Parent: Daimler-Motoren-Gesellschaft (1899–1909)
- Website: www.austrodaimler.com

Austro-Daimler was an Austrian car manufacturer from 1899 until 1934. It was a subsidiary of the German Daimler-Motoren-Gesellschaft (DMG) until 1909.

== History ==
In 1890, Eduard Bierenz was appointed as Austrian retailer. The company sold so well that it also began manufacturing the automobiles after uniting with Eduard Fischer's engineering factory. The works were located at Wiener-Neustadt. By this subsidiary DMG became the first automotive multinational in history.

Thus, on 11 August 1899, the Austrian Daimler Engine Society was founded. Whilst the assembling parts stemmed from Stuttgart, in 1900 they built their first automobile which featured 2 cylinders, 4 hp (3.0 kW), and 4 seats. Soon they started producing engines for luxurious cars, trucks, buses, maritime ships, and trains.

=== Paul Daimler era ===
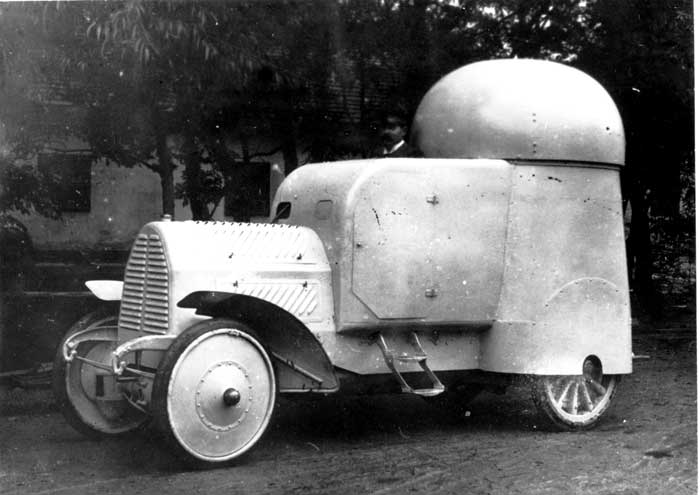
Austro-Daimler 4x4 four-wheel-drive Armoured Car (1904)

In 1902, Paul Daimler, Gottlieb Daimler's son, took charge of the Technical Department. He developed a compact car (8 hp, 45 km/h). In 1905 he built the company's first armoured car, which had 30 hp (22 kW). Also, the company produced engines for both trucks and buses. However, Daimler returned to Stuttgart in 1905 to take over the research and development department, which had been vacated by Maybach.

=== Ferdinand Porsche era ===
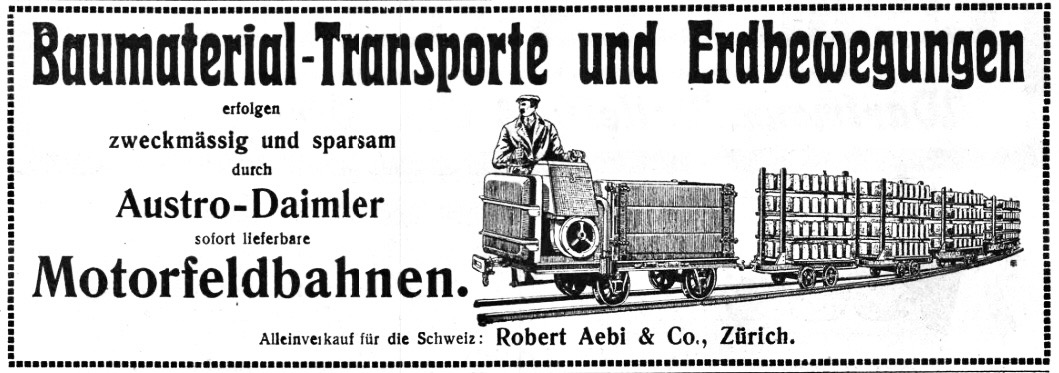
Austro-Daimler Light Railway (1919)

Senior Ferdinand Porsche took Daimler's place as technical designer. Although Austro-Daimler cars were competing at races already, Porsche pioneered aerodynamic usage with two famous racecars (Mixte and Maya). Also, he designed the Mercédès-Electrique-Mixte which was manufactured from 1902 until 1907.

Porsche also impelled a company reformation, at a time when the company had 800 workers. The company was renamed 'Austro-Daimler' on 27 July 1906. That year Emil Jellinek — who was Austrian too — bought several Austro-Daimler licenses to found ancillary companies abroad.

In 1908, the Austro-Daimler began producing Zeppelin engines. Indeed, for Porsche this was a personal interest since he liked to take Archduke Franz Ferdinand flying over Vienna.

Pushing the company's development further, Porsche granted Austro-Daimler's definitive independence from DMG's ownership in 1909. In 1910, the company was renamed Oesterreichische Daimler Motoren AG (Austrian Daimler Engines AG) whose logo was the Austrian Royal double-headed eagle. In 1912 DMG sold its remaining shares.

In 1911 Austro-Daimler began producing the Prinz Heinrich (in English: Prince Henry) model; this car, which featured an overhead cam 5,714-cc four-cylinder engine, quickly became famous. It could develop 95 bhp at 2,100 rpm; there was also a less potent version with side valves and a 6,900-cc engine capable of developing 60 hp (45 kW) at only 1,200 rpm. Both designs were by Porsche.

In 1913, the postal service ordered 30 electric vehicles, with the option to increase this to 45 vehicles.

=== WW I ===
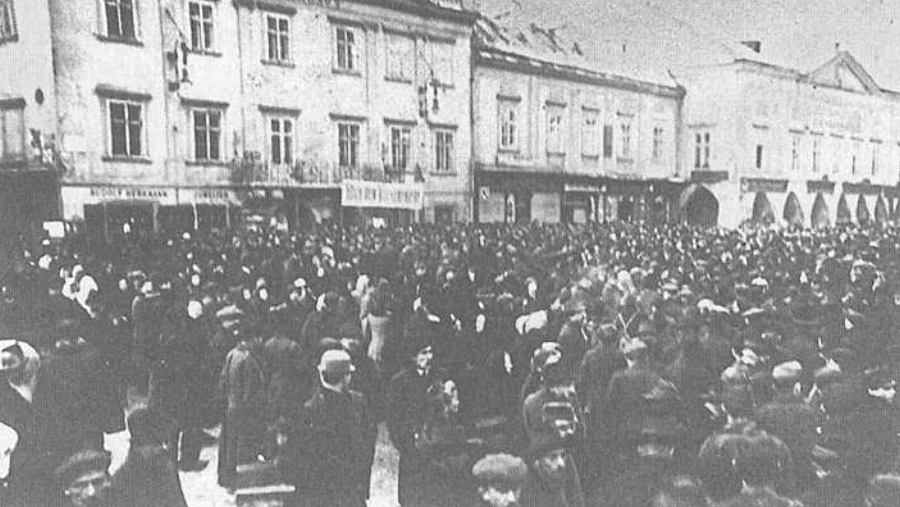
Striking workers from Austro-Daimler assembling outside the Town Hall, Wiener Neustadt, 18 January 1918

During the First World War, the 4,500 workers of Austro-Daimler contributed in large quantities to wartime production. They played a key role in the 1918 Austro-Hungarian January Strike in which workers inspired by the Bolshevik seizure of power took strike action to oppose the war. A key factor in the strike was the halving of the flour ration. Porsche met the workers and agreed to drive to Vienna to speak to the Minister of Food. However, his plea to the workers to return to work was ignored and they marched on the Town Hall. Here they were joined by other workers from the locomotive factory, the radiator works, the aircraft factory and local ammunition plants of G. Rath and the Lichtenwörther. The assembly soon numbered over 10,000 and the Stadtholder phoned the Volksernährungsamt - the state organisation managing food supply. However, the minister, General Anton Höfer only promised to meet a delegation of the workers. The strike spread across the empire and involved over 700,000 workers.

=== 1920–1930s ===
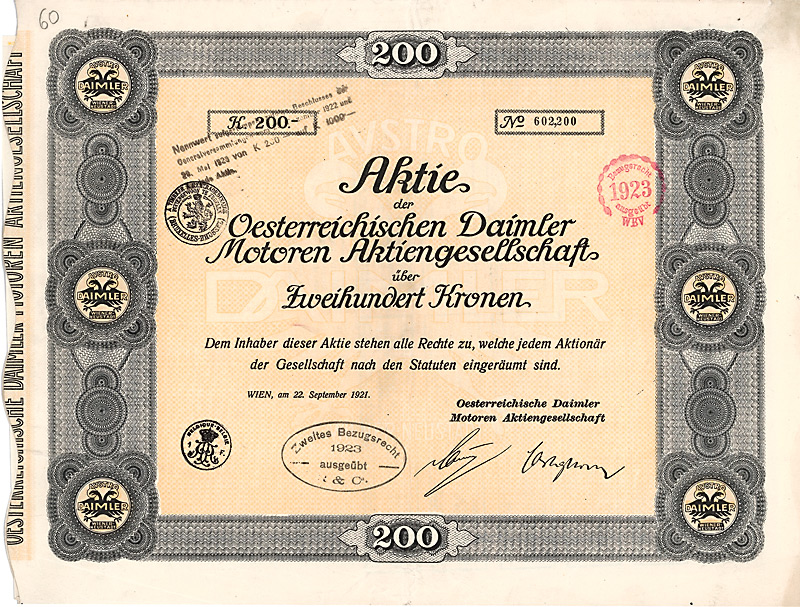
Share of the Oesterreichische Daimler Motoren AG, issued 22. September 1921

After the war, the company returned to the production of automobiles. Austro-Daimler still claimed Royal patronage via its connection with Prince Heinrich.

Soon, the company began collapsing. In the first place, Austro-Daimler fused with several companies — Skoda, Fiat, and Puch (1928). Then, it was submerged under Camillo Castiglioni's squandering management.

At this time, Porsche created the 1.3-liter "Sascha" racing cars (named after their backer, Count Sascha Kolowrat-Krakowski) in the early 1920s. The smallest model the company offered was a 2,212-cc four-cylinder. However, as the economic situation worsened, Porsche abandoned the company in 1923, ridding himself of Austro-Daimler's financial difficulties. Instead, he moved to Stuttgart's DMG.

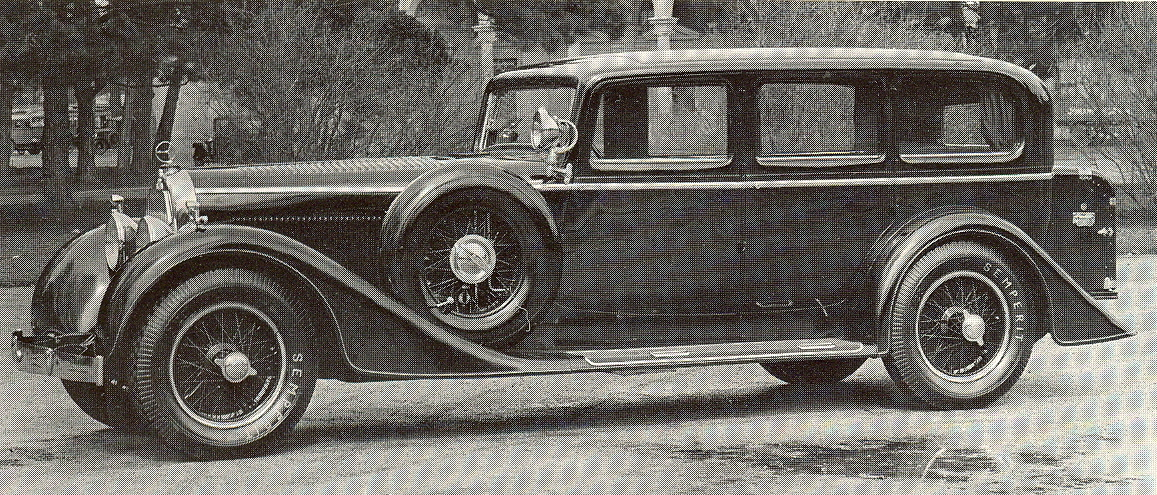
Austro-Daimler ADR 8 Pullman (1932).

The outstanding production car offered by Austro-Daimler during the 1930s was the ADM, which featured overhead cam six-cylinder engines of 2,540 cc, 2,650 cc, and 2,994 cc. The last-named (the ADM III) developed 110 hp (82 kW) at 4,000 rpm and was one of the greatest automobiles of the decade. Also offered was a less luxurious sporting version, the 100 hp (75 kW) ADR.

1931 saw Austro-Daimler introduce a 4,624-cc eight-cylinder car, a superb, highly expensive luxury vehicle. The last great car built at the Austrian works was the six-cylinder "Bergmeister", which featured an overhead cam 3,614-cc engine that could develop 120 hp (89 kW) at 3,600 rpm; this car had a top speed of 140 km/h (87 mph). In 1934 the company merged with Steyr Automobile, creating the Steyr-Daimler-Puch conglomerate. However, in this same year, Austro-Daimler was dissolved.

=== Postwar era ===
In the 1970s and into the 1980s bicycles were made by Steyr-Daimler-Puch with some models bearing the Puch trademark, and more upscale models bearing the Austro-Daimler trademark. When the bicycle manufacturing aspects of the consortium were sold in 1987 to Piaggio & C. S.p.A. of Italy, the Puch trademark was conveyed. The rights to the name Austro-Daimler, however, were not sold. Since then, no bicycles have been made bearing this trademark.

=== 21st Century ===
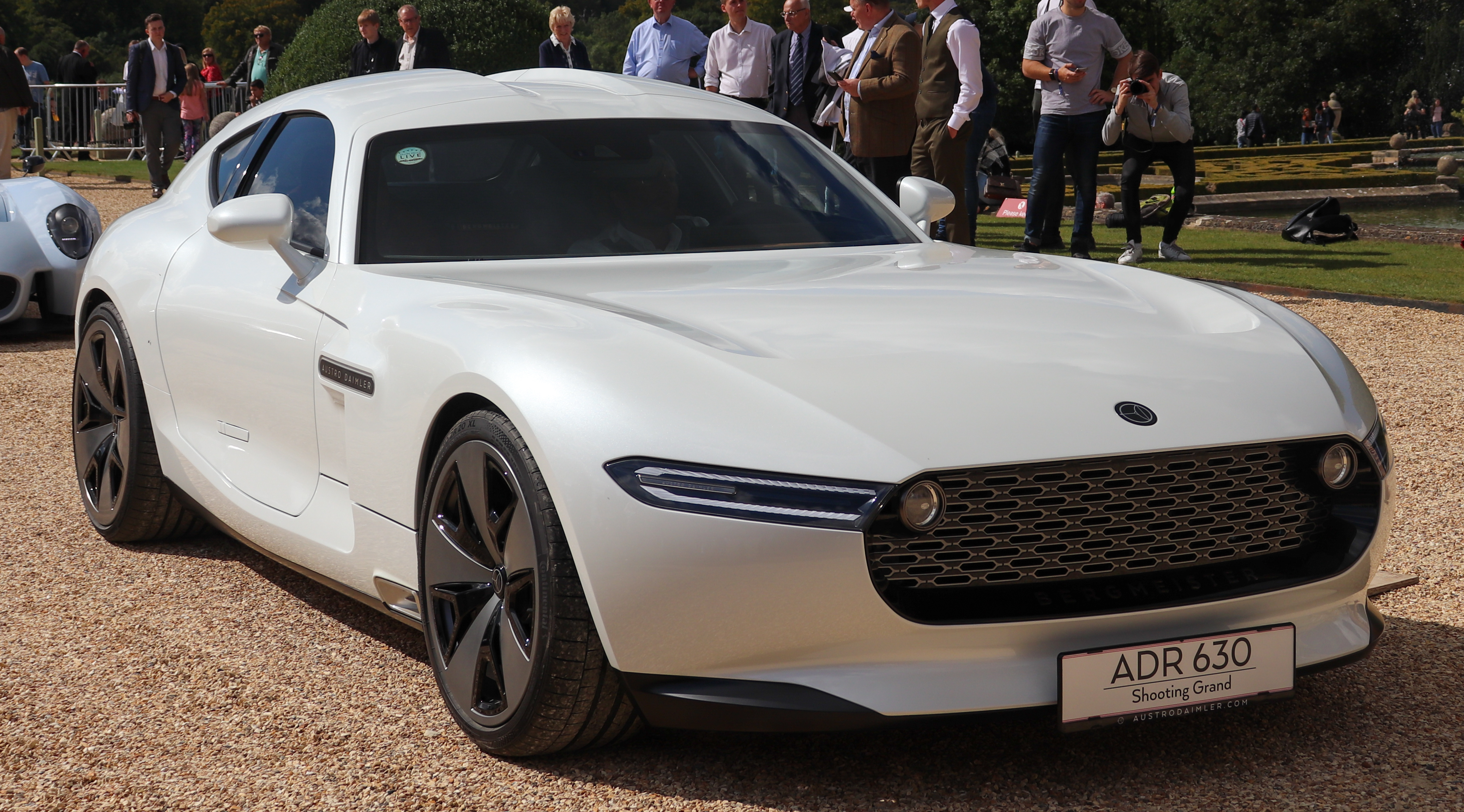
2019 Austro Daimler Bergmeister ADR 630 Shooting Grand 3.0

In 2019, a new Austro Daimler was shown at the Concorso d’Eleganza Villa d’Este. Named the Bergmeister ADR 630 Shooting Grand, the car featured a 3 litre turbocharged six-cylinder engine from the Mercedes-AMG GT 4-Door Coupe, paired with three electric motors, producing a total of 1,182 horsepower. The car was inspired by the 1931 Austro-Daimler Bergmeister. Project manager Roland Stagl planned to produce a series of vehicles following the Bergmeister's UK debut at Salon Privé, however, production is yet to commence.

== Prominent members of staff ==
=== Designers ===
- Willibald Gatter
- Oskar Hacker
- Karl Rabe

=== Workers ===
- Josip Broz Tito during 1912–13

== See also ==
- Daimler-Motoren-Gesellschaft
- USA Daimler
- Steyr-Daimler-Puch

== Gallery ==
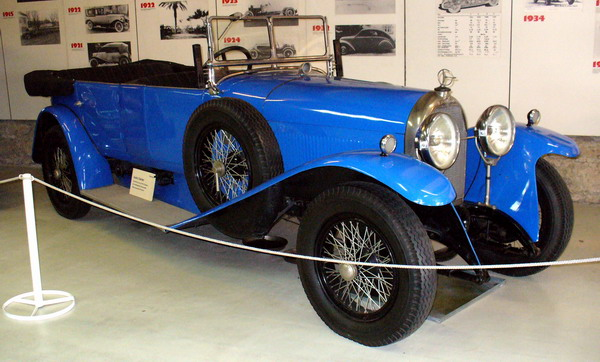
Austro-Daimler ADM 1923

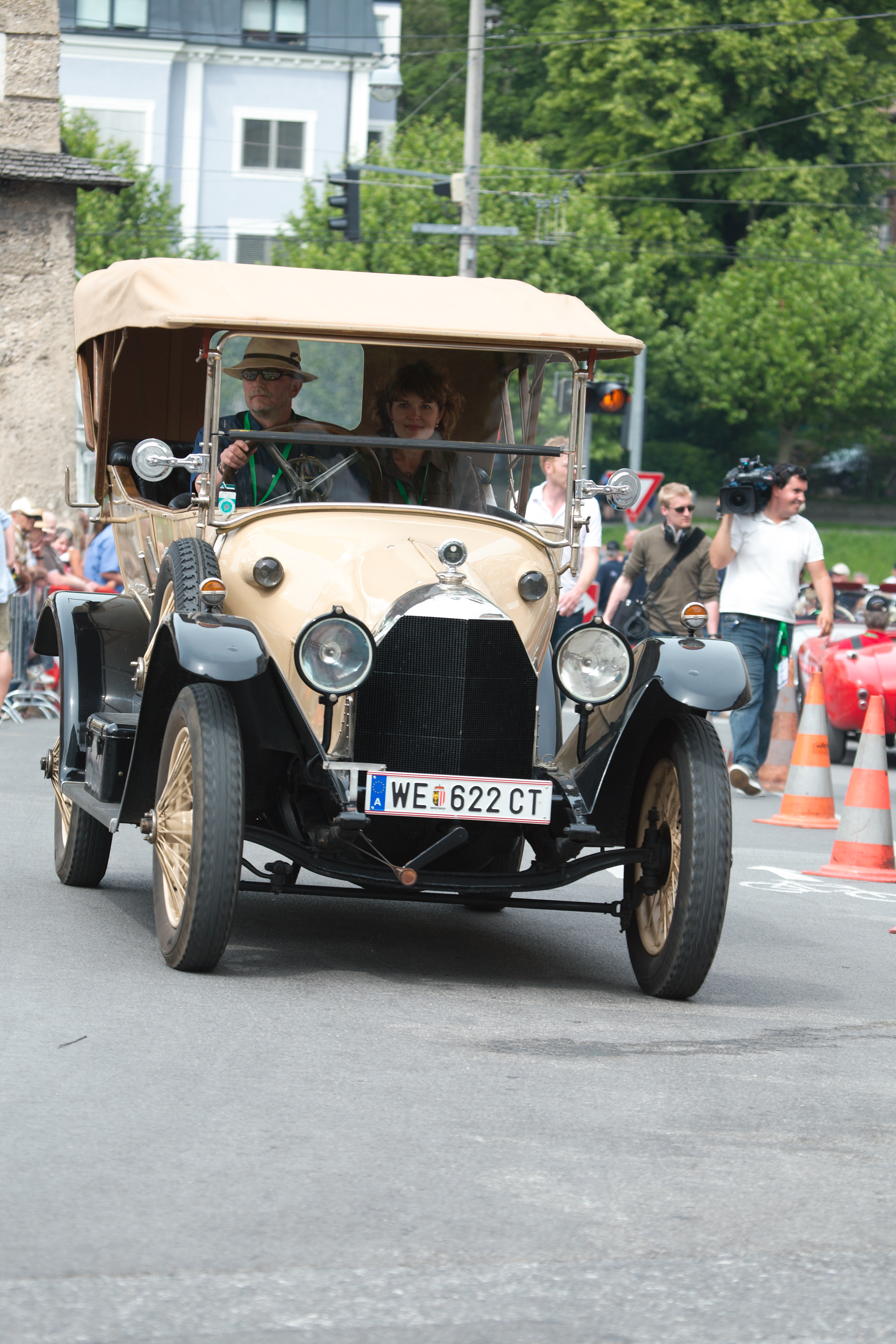
Austro-Daimler 14/32 from 1914

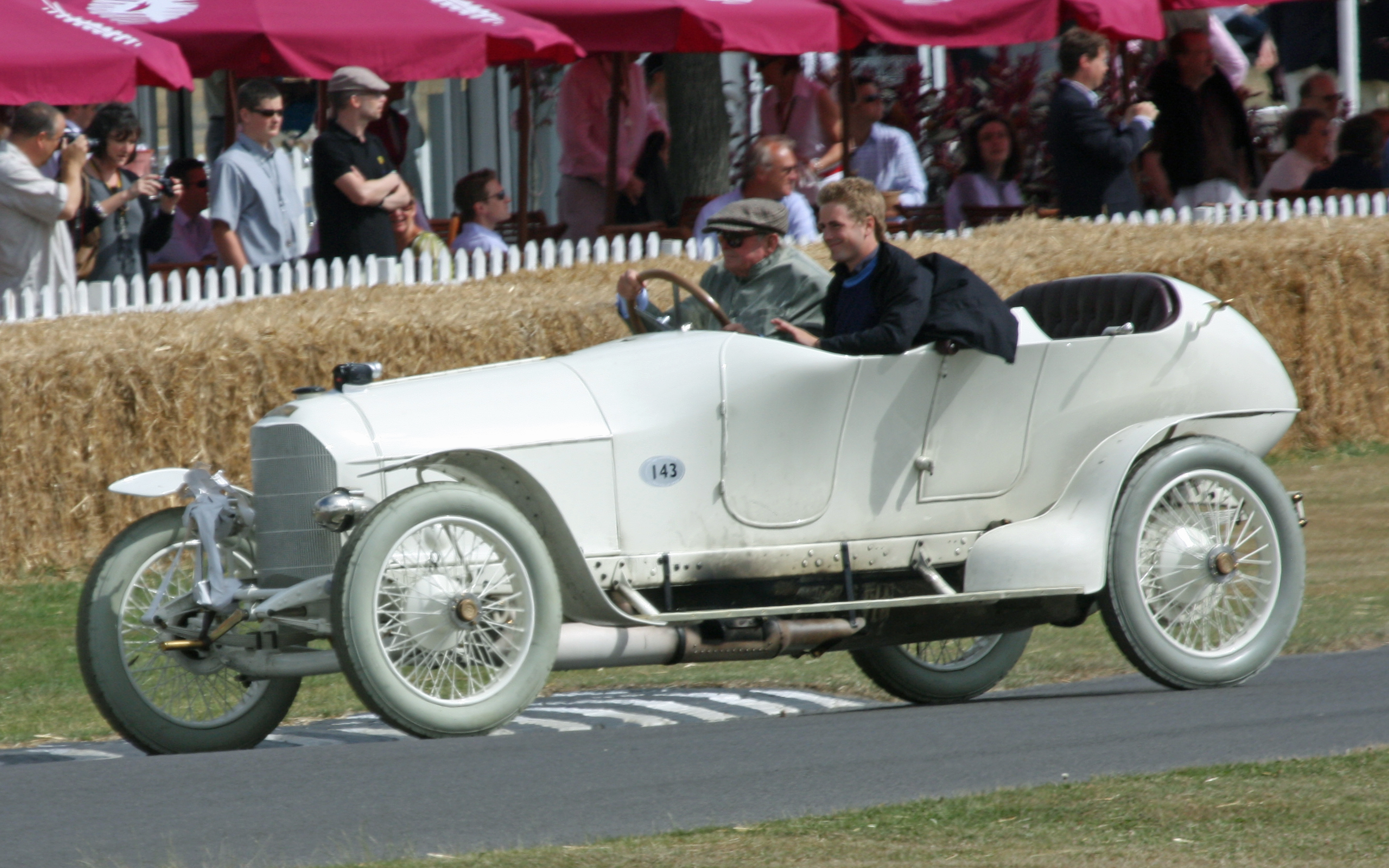
1910 Austro-Daimler Prince Henry

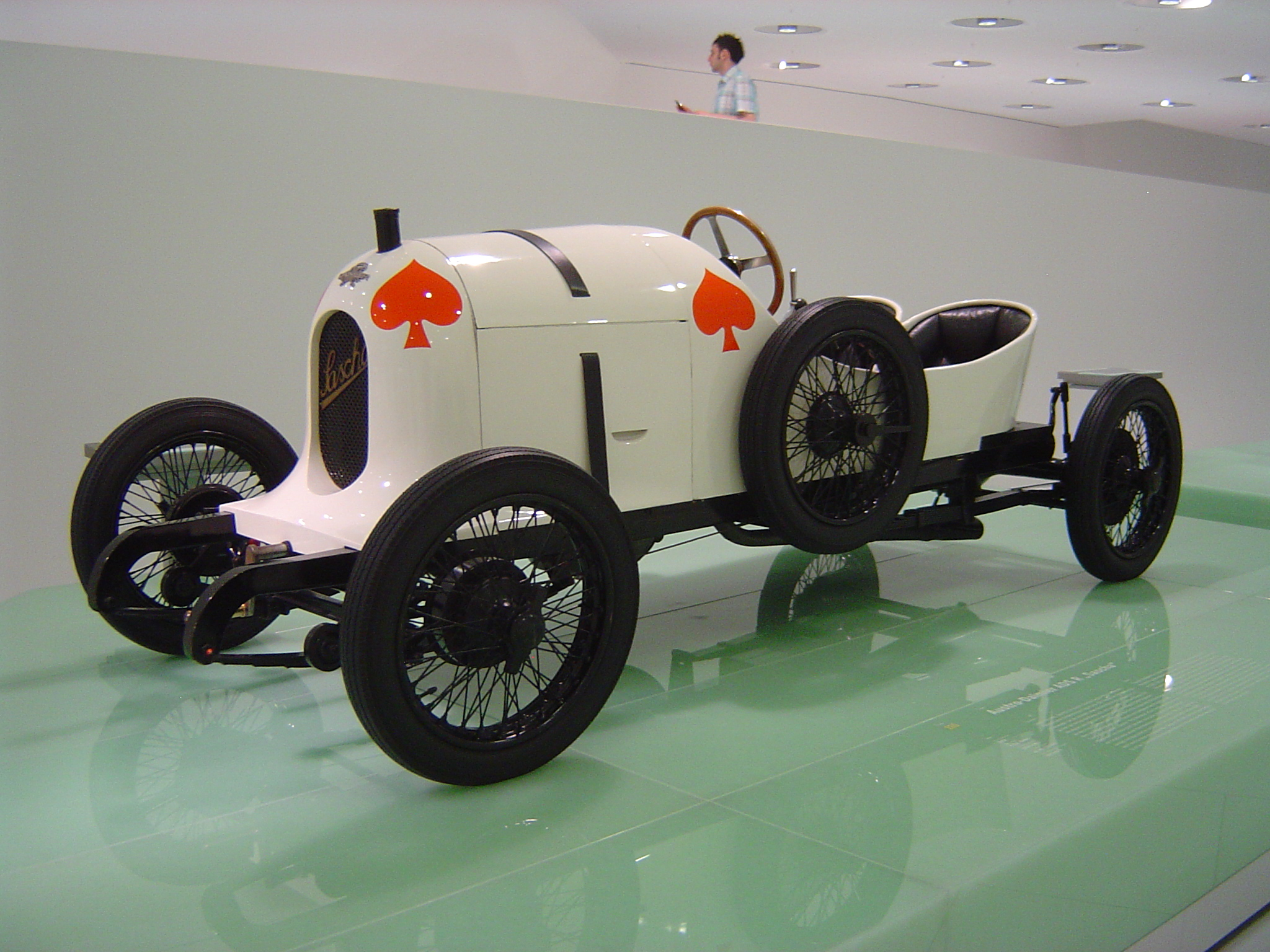
Austro-Daimler Sascha in the Porsche Museum in Stuttgart
