= Badische Automobilfabrik Heim =

German Grand Prix car manufacturer

Badische Automobilfabrik Heim & Cie.
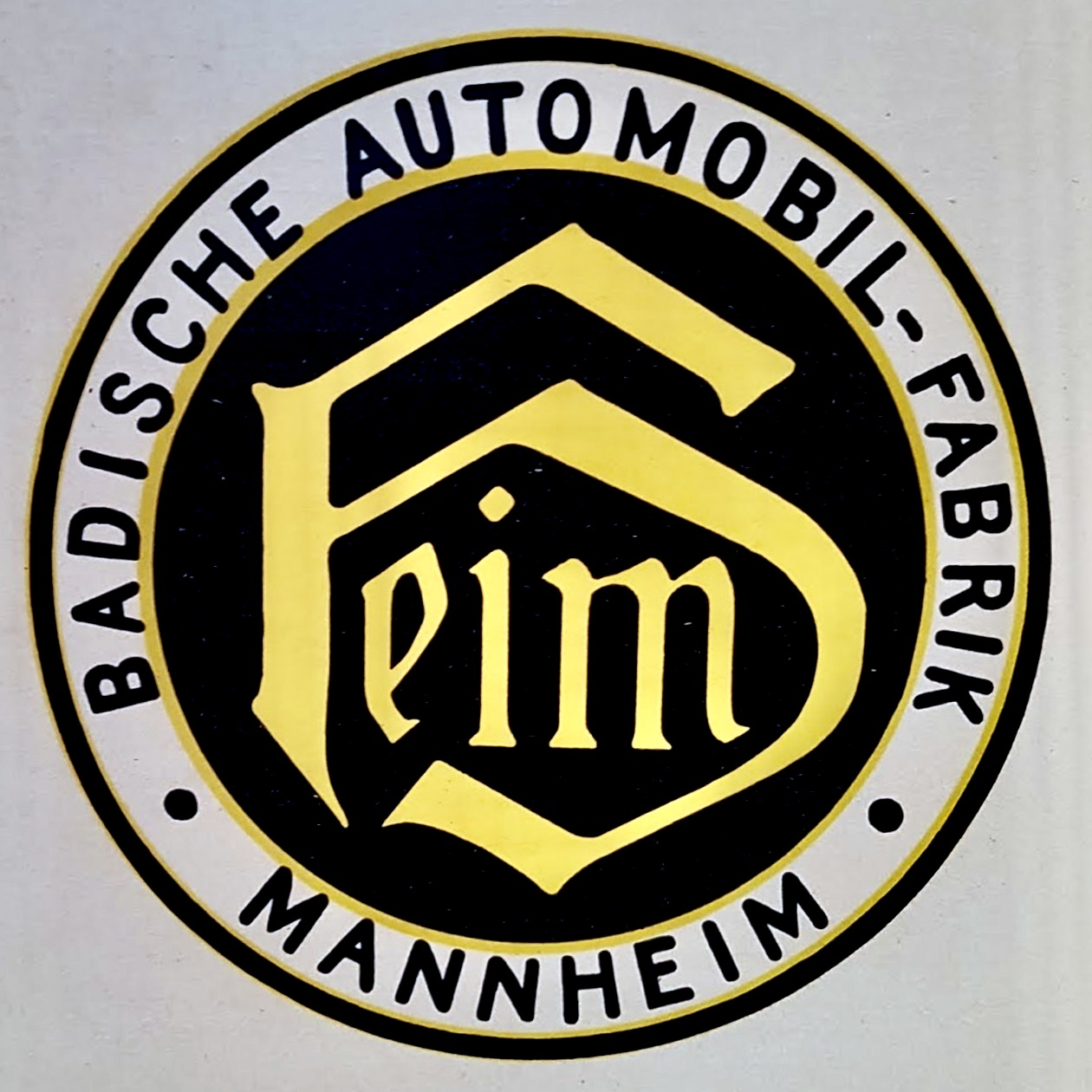
- Founded: 1920
- Founder: Franz Heim
- Defunct: 1927
- Headquarters: Mannheim, Republik Baden, Deutsches Reich

Die Badische Automobilfabrik Heim & Cie. (Baden Car Factory Heim) was a German car manufacturer, whose output included a Grand Prix car, which raced in 1922.

== Foundation ==
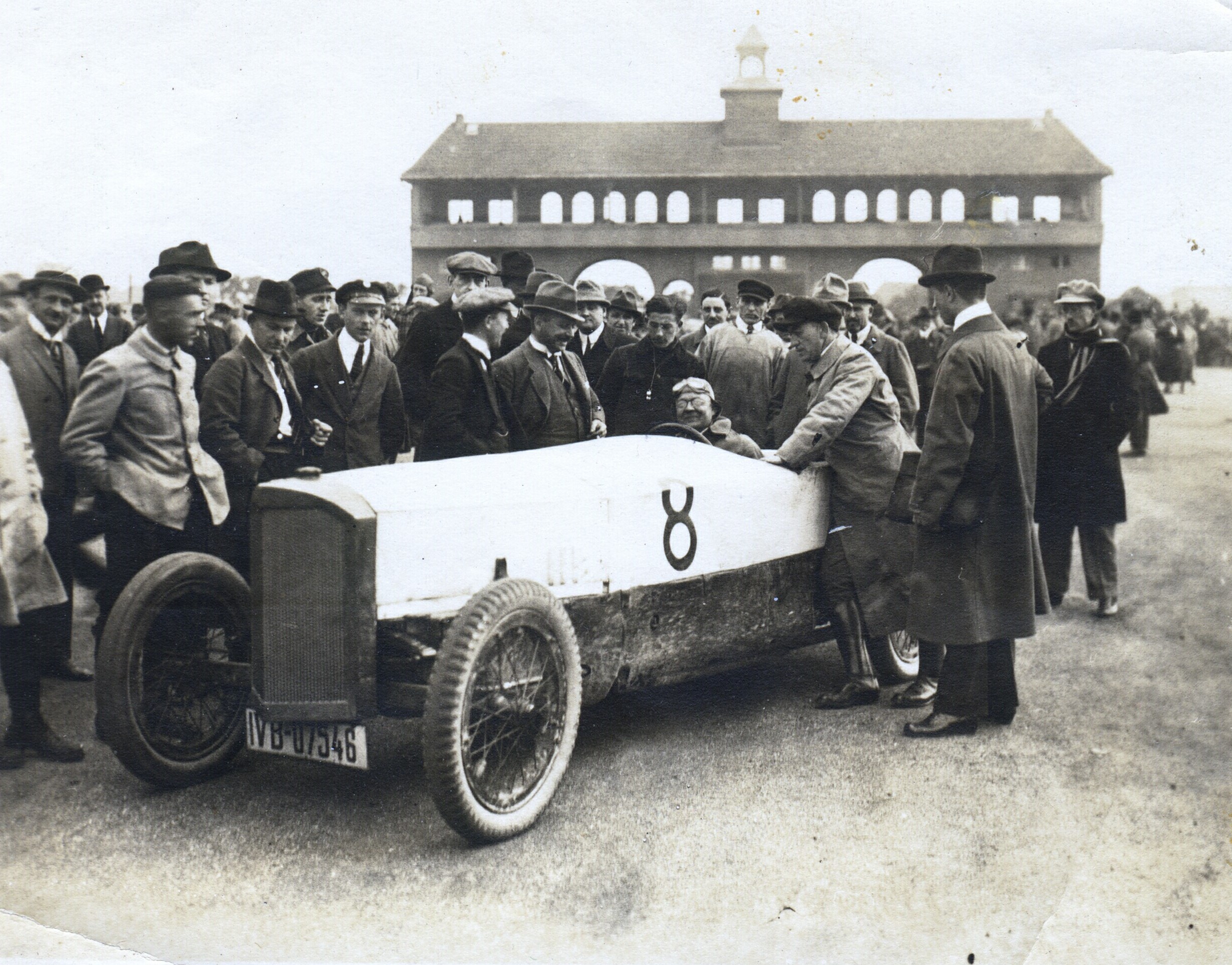
Arthur Henney in the 6/18 model at the Avus in 1921

The company was founded by Franz Heim, who in 1896, as a 14 year old, became only the second apprentice recruited by Karl Benz, and in 1907 was chosen as the riding mechanic for René Hanriot at the Grand Prix that year. After Benz withdrew from racing in 1911, Heim started his own workshop, and was commissioned to build Grand Prix cars for Lorraine-Dietrich in 1912. He formed a new company - Badische Automoobilfabrik Heim & Cie. - with wealthy amateur driver Art Henney in Lindenhofstrasse in 1920, employing former Benz workers, building cars using the Selve engine; the first models, which appeared in September 1921, included the 6 cylinder 20hp model and an 8 cylinder 30hp model. The company's first race appearance came at the first race at the Avus in 1921.

== Grand Prix car ==
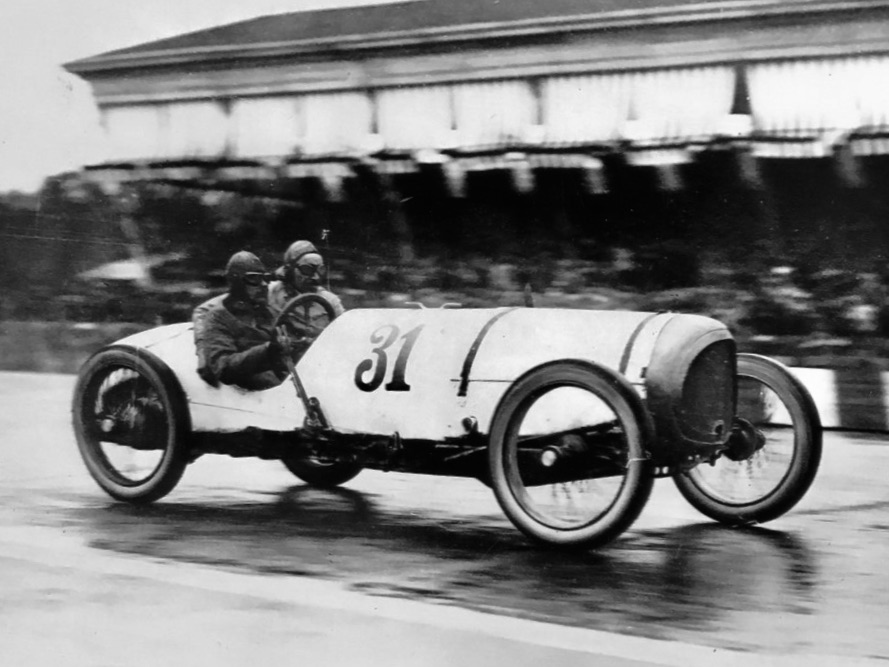
Reinhold Stahl at the 1922 Italian Grand Prix

In 1922, the company built a Grand Prix car, using an engine Heim himself had developed, at a new factory in Schanzenstraße, and the factory entered the 1922 Italian Grand Prix at the new Monza circuit. Heim had designed a low-slung car to cutdown on wind resistance, with the mandatory spare tyre being placed horizontally on the tail. However, the straight six 1,995cc engine only provided 80 horsepower, which kept its maximum speed well below those of the leading Fiat 804s. The race duly proved disastrous - the two Heims, driven by Heim himself and Reinhold Stahl, both retired, having been lapped on average on every other lap.

== Final years ==
The company was hit hard by the economic crisis of 1923, which meant that a newly developed road car found few buyers. The company nevertheless continued, entering cars in rallies 1924 and 1925, and developed an "Industrie-Wagen" which was basically the 8/40hp passenger car with a reinforced floor for heavy payloads.

However, beset by financial difficulties (which saw the company put into a form of administration in November 1925), on 6 January 1926, Franz Heim committed suicide. The company did re-start in April 1926, but was formally wound up in April 1927. Total vehicle production probably did not reach three figures.
