= BBÖ 82 =

Class of 24 Austrian 2-8-2T locomotives

BBÖ 82 DRB 95.1 ÖBB 95
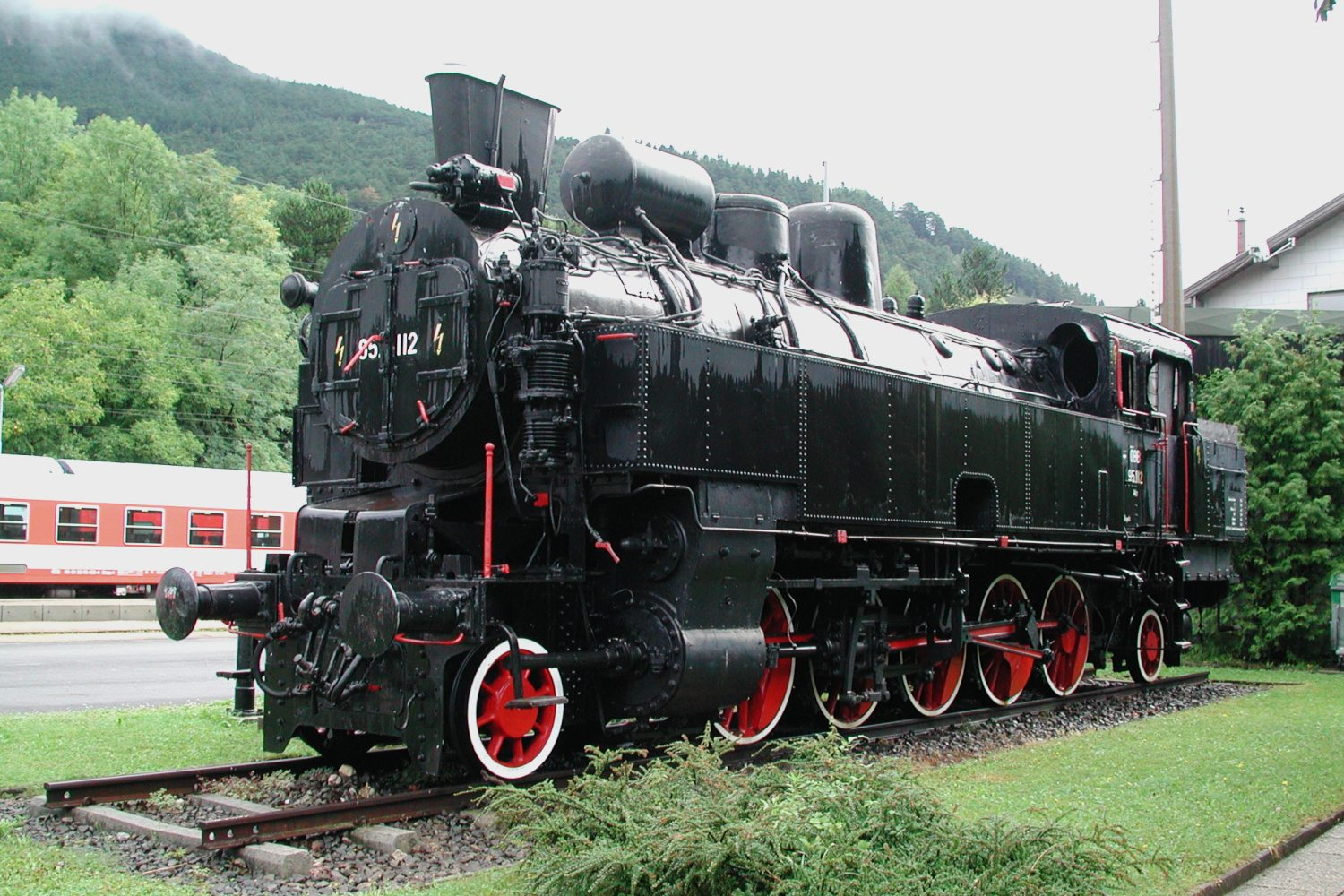
- 95.112 plinthed as a monument at Payerbach-Reichenau railway station
Type and origin
- Builder: Wiener Neustädter Lokomotivfabrik
- Build date: 1922 (20), 1928 (4)
- Total produced: 24
Specifications
- Configuration
  - Whyte: 2-10-2T
- Gauge: 1,435 mm (4 ft 8 1/2 in)
- Leading dia.: 870 mm (2 ft 10 1/4 in)
- Driver dia.: 1,298 mm (4 ft 3 1/8 in)
- Trailing dia.: 870 mm (2 ft 10 1/4 in)
- Length: 13,500 mm (44 ft 3 1/2 in)
- Height: 4,650 mm (15 ft 3 1/8 in)
- Adhesive weight: 72.0 t (70.9 long tons; 79.4 short tons)
- Service weight: 95.0 t (93.5 long tons; 104.7 short tons)
- Boiler
- No. of heating tubes: 148
- Heating tube length: 4,250 mm (13 ft 11 1/4 in)
- Boiler pressure: 14 kgf/cm^{2} (1.37 MPa; 199 lbf/in^{2})
- Heating surface
  - Firebox: 3.42 m^{2} (36.8 sq ft)
  - Radiative: 12.00 m^{2} (129.2 sq ft)
  - Tubes: 124.50 m^{2} (1,340.1 sq ft)
- Superheater
  - Heating area: 33.75 m^{2} (363.3 sq ft)
- Cylinder size: 590 mm (23 1/4 in)
- Piston stroke: 632 mm (24 7/8 in)
Performance figures
- Maximum speed: 60 km/h (37 mph)
Career
- Numbers: BBÖ 82.01 – 82.24; DRB: 95 101 – 95 124; ÖBB: 95.101 … 95.124; ČSD: 524.1500

The BBÖ 82 was a class of 24 Austrian 2-10-2 tank locomotives of the Federal Railways of Austria (Bundesbahnen Österreichs, BBÖ).

== History ==
In 1922, due to the new border shortening the former main lines from Vienna to the north and east, the BBÖ needed new goods train tank locomotives which would not have to be turned, saving the fees due in the border stations abroad for using turntables. The locomotives would also have to be suitable for the Vienna connecting railways with their unfavourable routing.

In order to help Wiener Neustädter Lokomotivfabrik, suitable parts of the 80 series would be used. The new 1′E1′ h2t (2-10-2, superheated, 2-cylinder tank) locomotives were given the series designation 82 and 20 units were put into service in 1922, not only on the originally planned routes, but also on steep sections of other routes (Selzthal, Knittelfeld, Tauernbahn, Vienna connecting railway and on the suburban line of the Vienna Stadtbahn). Four more locomotives were delivered in 1928. From 1927 machines of this series came to Gloggnitz for use on hauling trains on the Semmering railway.

After the Anschluß of Austria, the locomotives were taken over by Deutsche Reichsbahn in 1939, and assigned to DRB Class 95^{1} and renumbered 95 101 to 95 124. The locomotives also retained this designation with the later ÖBB, which was able to take over all locomotives except for two locomotives. Until the electrification of the Semmering railway in 1959, the 95s were typical for train-hauling services on this mountain railway. After 1959 the locomotives went to the Franz-Josefs-Bahn (until it was dieselized in 1961) and to other locations throughout Austria. The class was taken out of service in 1968 and the last locomotive was withdrawn in 1972. The 95.112 was already intended for a railway museum in 1971 and was erected as a monument in the Payerbach-Reichenau train station on Semmering after its retirement.

The two locomotives not taken in to ÖBB stock, 95 107 and 95 123, had been left in Czechoslovakia after the war. The Czechoslovak State Railways (ČSD) renumbered the later as 524.1500.
