= Gatter Autowerk Reichstadt =

Defunct Bohemian automobile manufacturer

- Company type: Private
- Industry: Automotive
- Founded: 1930; 96 years ago
- Founder: Willibald Gatter
- Defunct: 1937; 89 years ago
- Headquarters: Reichstadt, Czechoslovakia
- Products: Cars

Gatter Autowerk Reichstadt was a Czechoslovak automobile manufacturing company founded in 1930 in Reichstadt, Czechoslovakia by the Bohemian German automotive pioneer Willibald Gatter (1896-1973). It produced small, affordable cars and advertised these as “Volksauto” or “Volkswagen”, a “Car for the People”. Its car production ended in 1937 when economic crisis hit Czechoslovakia. After the Second World War and his expulsion from Czechoslovakia, Willibald Gatter tried to sell another small car in West Germany, the so-called Gatter-Mini (1952-1956) which remained a prototype.

== History ==
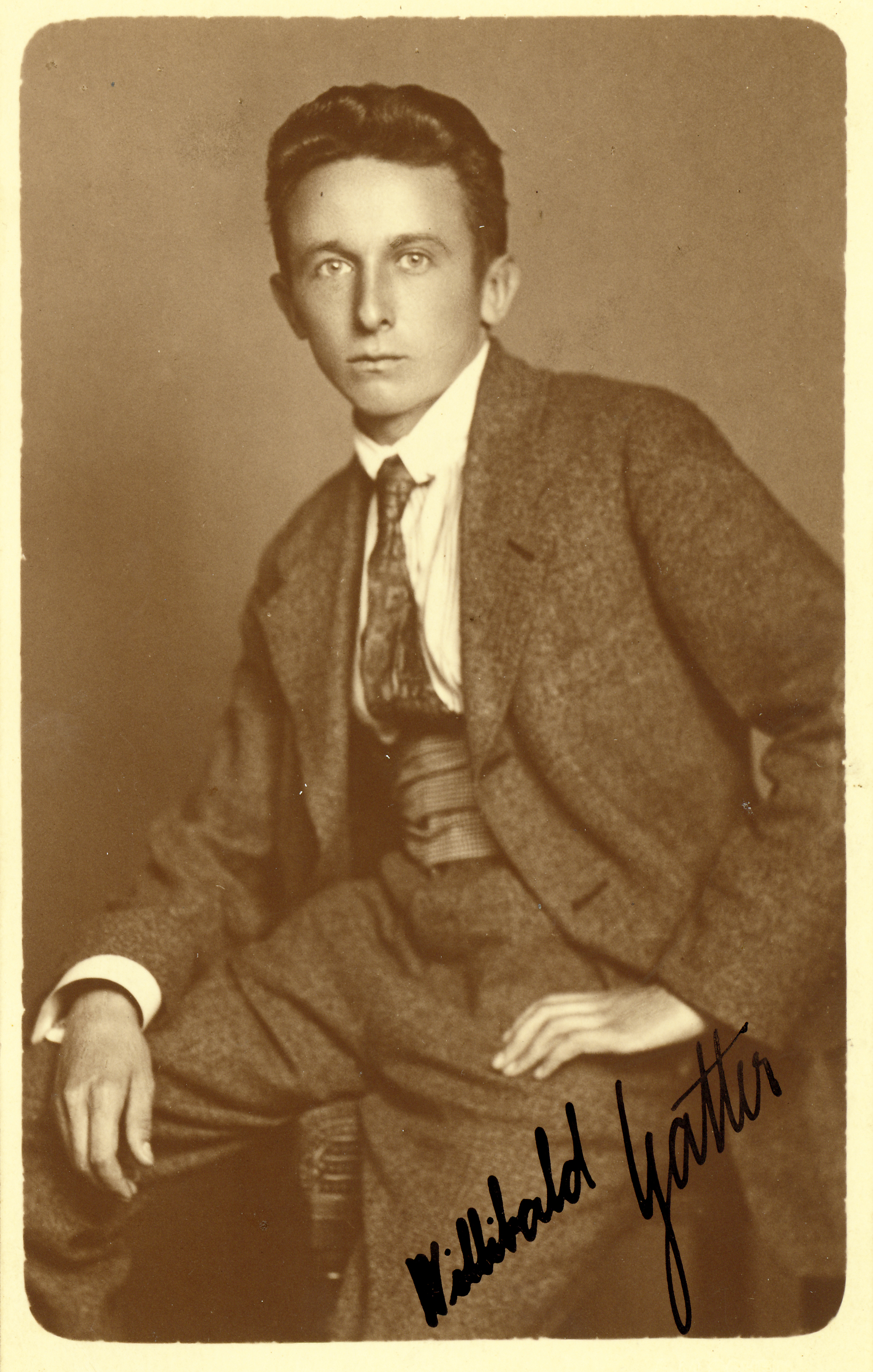
Signed portrait of Willibald Gatter, Vienna 1924

When the Gatter company was founded in 1930 in Reichstadt, its founder Willibald Gatter had already 15 years of experience in this industry. From 1915 to 1918 he had worked for the Škoda Works in the production of so-called C-Trains – transport engines for Škoda's heavy mortars, such as the Škoda 305 mm Model 1911. Following the First World War, Gatter worked as lead engineer and department head for Austro Daimler in Wiener Neustadt. He played a major role in the development of Austro Daimler's models AD 6-17 (1921–1924), ADM II (1923-1927), and ADV (1924–1927). Together with Ferdinand Porsche, then technical director of Austro Daimler, Gatter developed the 1.3-liter Sascha racing cars. Within Austro Daimler, a company then producing mainly luxury cars, Willibald Gatter lobbied for the production of small and affordable vehicles for the working class. When this call went unheard, Gatter left Austro Daimler in 1926. In collaboration with Schicht AG, a large industrial lubricant company in Aussig an der Elbe, Gatter produced between 1926 and 1929 the so-called “European Car” or Modell Schreckenstein (named after the Schreckenstein castle in Aussig).

Several prototypes of this car were built which carried a “Gatter” logo. Willibald Gatter built these vehicle based on his own patents for axles and gear box. The car was favorably reviewed by the automobile press. The Great Depression, however, brought this endeavor to an abrupt end in 1929.

=== Founding ===
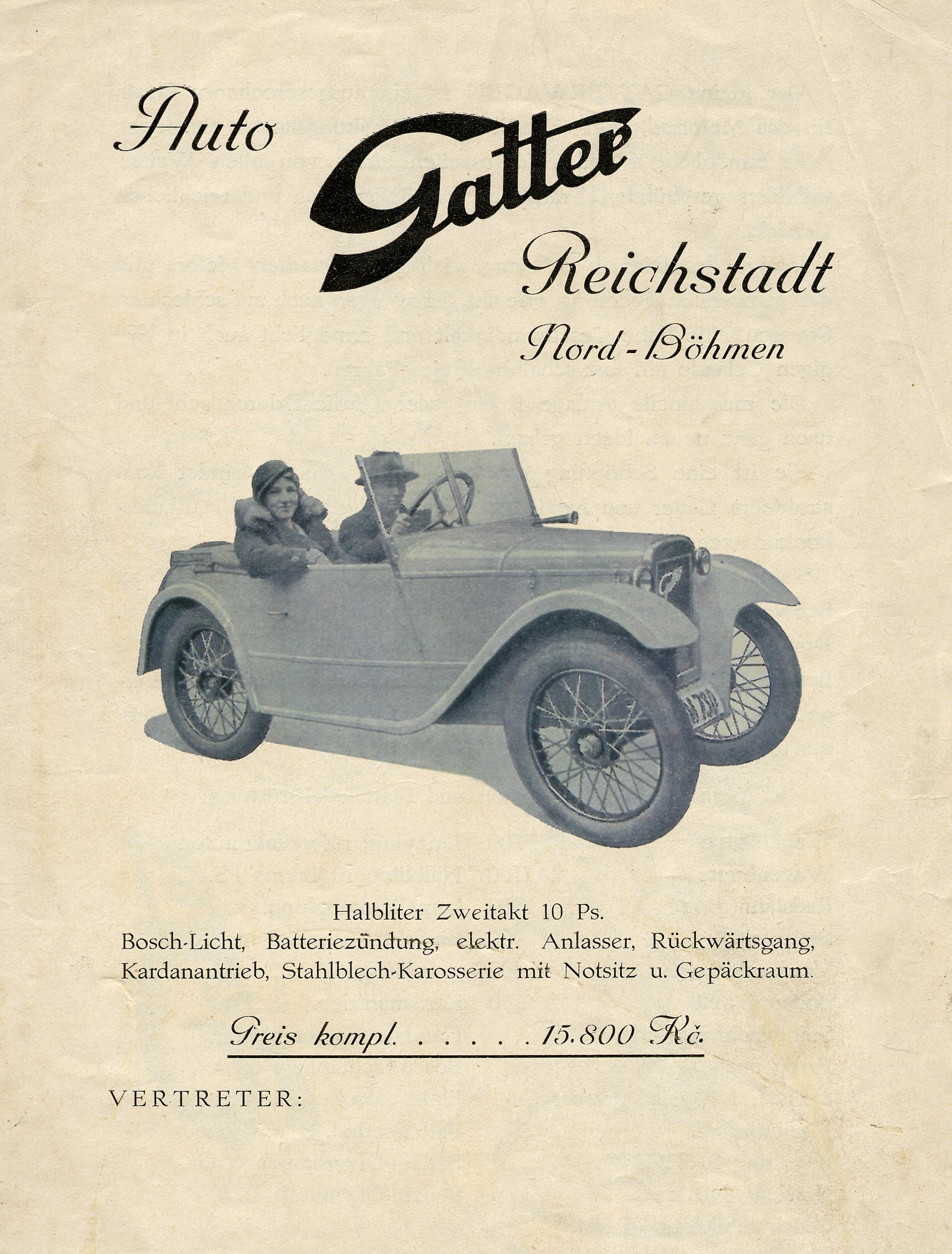
Advertisement for the Small Gatter in 1934

Having recovered from this shock and having secured sufficient financing, Willibald Gatter founded in 1930 his own automobile company in Zakupy (formerly known by its German name Reichstadt). The company's name was recorded as “Gatter Autowerk Reichstadt” (Czech: “Gatter Autopodnik Zákupy”) in the city's annals.

From 1930 to 1937 Gatter Autowerk Reichstadt produced some 1,650 vehicles. Other historians give considerably lower numbers, based on lists of vehicle registrations in Czechoslovakia. These studies omit however cars sold to the German Reich, where the Gatter company had several sales outlets, such as in Saxony and in Franconia.

Seven different models are known. The 1930 model was a two-seater with baggage compartment. It had a length of 2.6 meters and was equipped with an air-cooled two-stroke Villers engine with 9 hp. This model attained a maximum speed of 60 km/h (37 mph). In order to reduce weight, the first Kleine Gatter model had only one central headlight, one door only, and had no reverse gear. Later models of the Kleine Gatter were more elegant four-seaters with an aerodynamic body. They had 10 hp and reached a maximum speed of 75 km/h (47 mph). Gatter now produced his own motors, which were produced in Warnsdorf in the Julius Winkler Foundry.

Gatter cars were highly maneuverable; they had a low center of mass and thus excellent road holding. This made them an ideal and popular vehicle for the narrow and windy mountain roads of the fringes of Bohemia. The Gatter cars were sold at prices not much higher than those of motorbikes. Contemporary advertisement of the Gatter company highlighted this with the slogans “Get a car for the price of a motorbike”. The Czechoslovak press thus hailed the Kleine Gatter as “Volkswagen”, a vehicle for the masses. With an initial price of 12,800 Czechoslovak Crowns or 1,000 German Reichsmark, it was the cheapest car of its time in Europe.

To prove the reliability of small, inexpensive cars, Willibald Gatter participated in the early 1930s in many hillclimbing races in his Kleine Gatter and won numerous prizes. In 1931, he even challenged Rudolf Caracciola, then world champion. At the Schauinsland race the two unequal opponents met. Caracciola on a Mercedes SSKL with 7,069 ccm and 300 hp and Willibald Gatter on his “Kleine Gatter” model 1931 with 350 ccm and 9 hp. While Caracciola won with a time of 8:51 hours for the 720 kilometer long race track, Gatter took 17:38 hours. The press however celebrated Gatter as the true winner and his car as a model of economic viability. He had made the race in a car more than 30 times less powerful in just about twice Caracciola's record time.

With his Kleine Gatter, Willibald Gatter won gold medals for the German Mountain Grand Prix ("Grosser Bergpreis von Deutschland") and the Bohemian Mountain Race ("Böhmisches Bergrennen"). When a recession his hit Czechoslovakia in the mid 1930s, which affected especially the industrialized border areas of the country, Gatter's middle class clients were not able to afford new cars. By 1937 the Gatter Autowerk Reichstadt had to close down.

=== After WWII ===
At the end of the Second World War, Willibald Gatter found himself a refugee in Western Germany after the expulsion of Germans from Czechoslovakia. Here he attempted to relaunch his car production in the 1950s.

His aim was again an affordable car for the middle classes, that had little money to spend in the reconstruction years following the Second World War. The result was the so-called Gatter-Mini produced from 1952 to 1958. Consumer preference for large American-style vehicles made the quest for investment capital difficult. The Gatter Mini thus remained a prototype and never went into serial production.

== Legacy ==
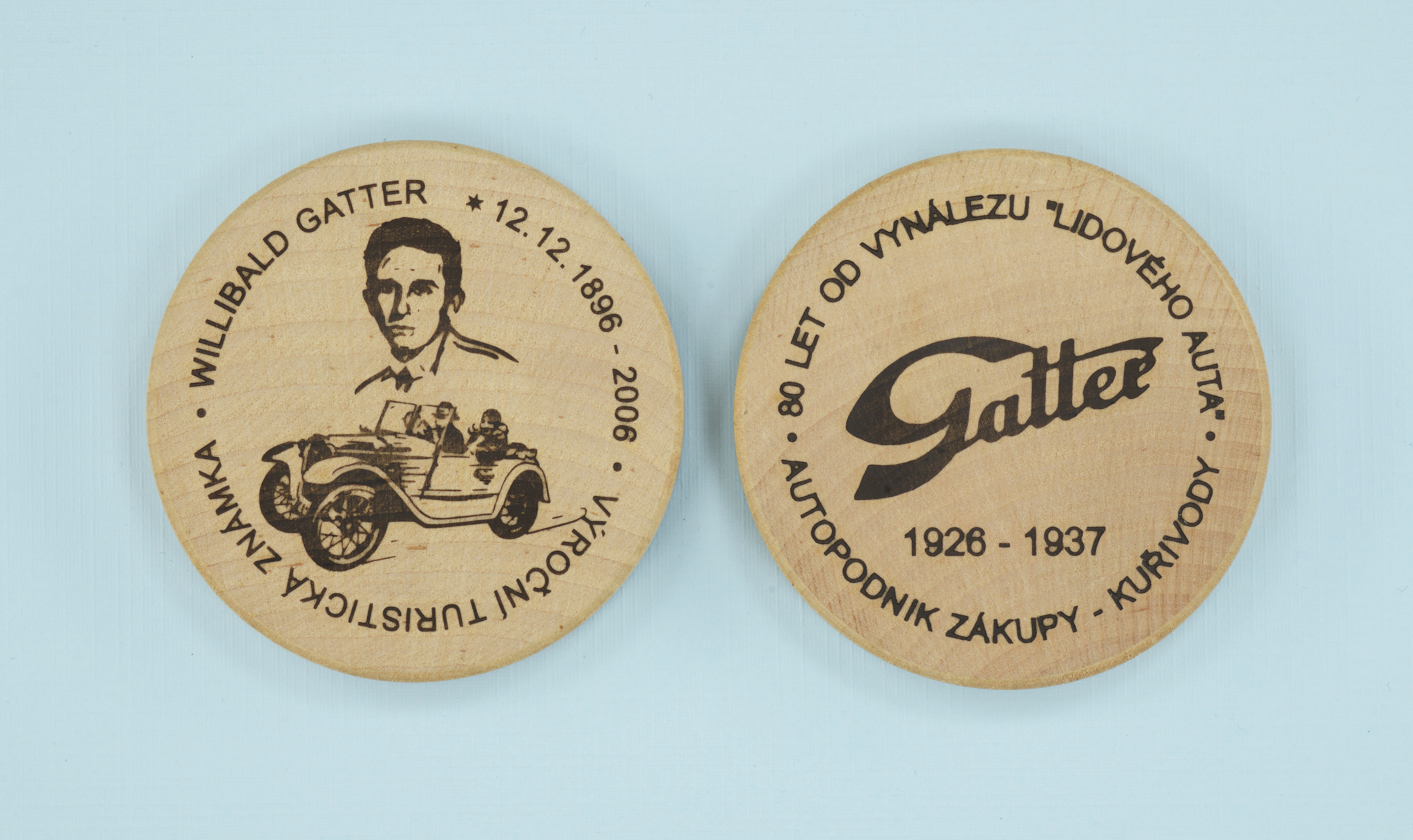
Czech collector's badge of 2006 commemorating Gatter's “People's Car” (Lidové auto).

Today, Willibald Gatter is considered to be one of the fathers of the “Volkswagen”. In the Czech Republic a Gatter-collector's badge was dedicated to him in 2006, commemorating his 110th birthday and the 80 years since building his first prototype of a “people's car” in 1926. Today only one unit of the Kleine Gatter seems to exist. It is an elegant four seater with reverse gear and chain drive produced in 1932.
