= Anton Höfer =

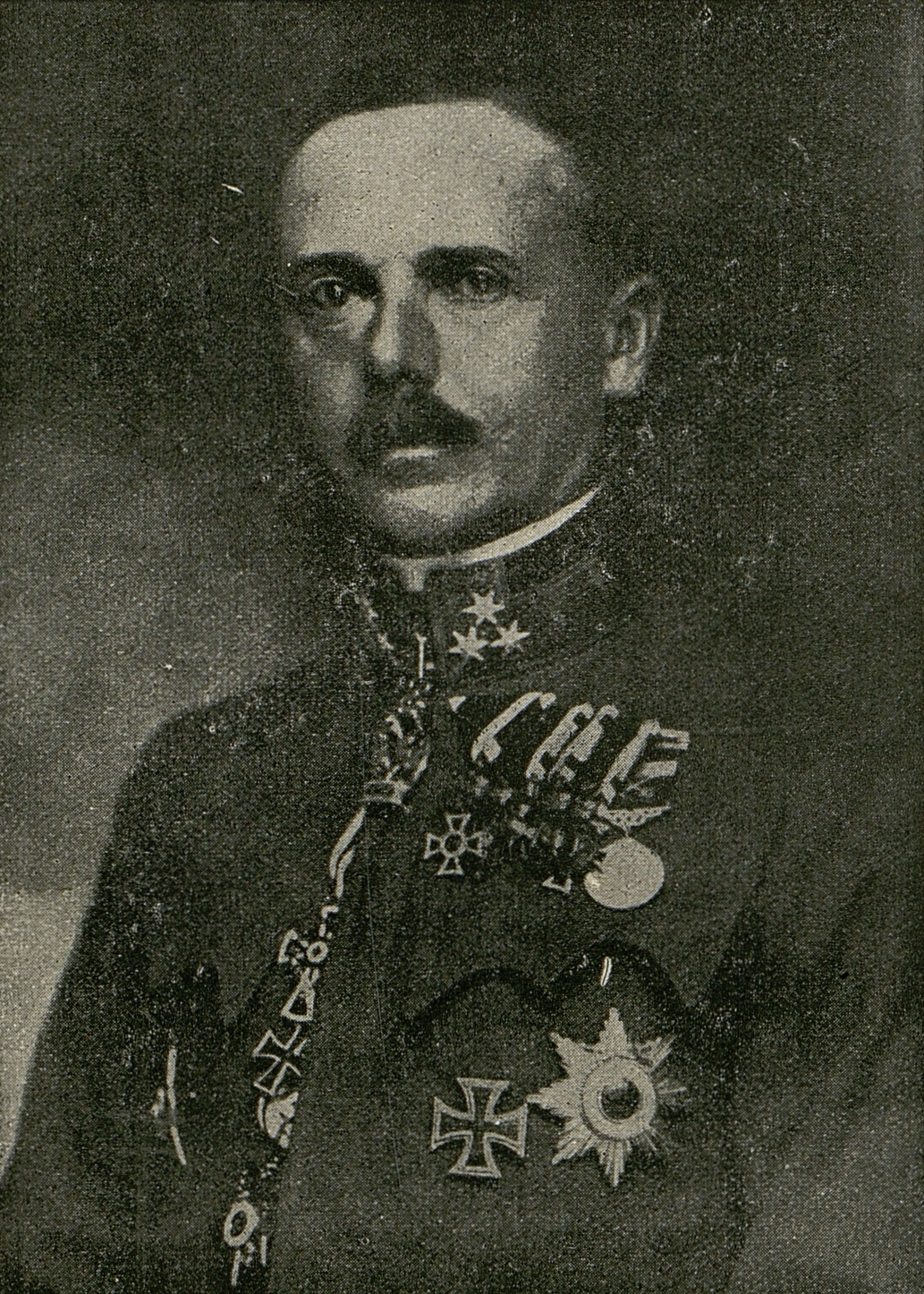
- Generalmajor Anton Höfer (c. 1916)
- Born: January 1, 1871
- Died: July 22, 1949
- Military career
- Allegiance: Austro-Hungary
- Rank: General

Anton Höfer (1 January 1871, Bozen - 22 July 1949, Vienna) was a General in the Austro-Hungarian Empire.

He was appointed Chief Quartermaster on 1 January 1916 for the Austro-Hungarian Armeeoberkommando. Then on 5 January 1917 he was appointed Präsidenten des Amtes für Volksernährung (president of the office for the People's Food). The Austro-Hungarian Empire was experiencing serious problems as regards the distribution of food. A central food bureau had already been established however despite various government regulations, public subsistence in Austria was descending into chaos. The men running it lacked the necessary skills. However under Major General Höfer the Amtes für Volksernährung was given expanded powers and started to enforce a new program which was more military in nature.

In January 1918 he was contacted by the workers council formed during the 1918 Austro-Hungarian January Strike following the reduction in the flour ration. He received a deputation from the Wiener Neustadt Workers Council, accompanied by Karl Renner, a politician with the Sozialdemokratische Arbeiterpartei Österreichs (SDAPÖ).
