= 1920 Grand Prix season =

Grand Prix season

Seasons
- ← 1919 1921 →

The 1920 Grand Prix season saw further activity in motor-racing gradually increase. Europe was still recovering from the end of the war and the terrible pandemic that swept the continent. Automotive companies were gradually re-establishing themselves after re-tooling from a wartime footing and getting production lines rolling again.

A new 3-litre formula was adopted on both sides of the Atlantic and the Indianapolis 500 would be a close contest between the best of the new designs from France and the USA. Ralph DePalma led for over half the race in his Ballot, only for it to catch fire with four laps to go. Gaston Chevrolet inherited the lead and held on to win by six minutes. His Monroe-Frontenac was the first American car to win the great race since 1912. DePalma got his revenge later in the year, winning the last Elgin Trophy, on the only road-course in the AAA Championship. Chevrolet won the AAA season championship; despite being killed at the end of the year in a collision at the Beverley Hills race he had already accumulated enough points.

Racing was gradually returning to Europe, although there was no Grand Prix. Club racing started again at Brooklands. A new race at Mugello in Italy was won by veteran Giuseppe Campari in an Alfa Romeo. Voiturette racing resumed with the Coupe des Voiturettes held on a shortened circuit at Le Mans. It was won by Ernest Friderich in a Bugatti. Near the end of the year, the Targa Florio was run again on the island of Sicily. It was won by Guido Meregalli in a Nazzaro GP.

== Major races ==
Date	Name	Circuit	Race Regulations	Race Distance	Winner's Time	Winning driver	Winning constructor	Report
30 May	(United States) VIII International 500 Mile Sweepstakes	Indianapolis	AAA	500 miles	5h 39m	(United States) Gaston Chevrolet	Monroe-Frontenac	Report
13 Jun	(Italy) I Circuito di Mugello	Mugello	Formula Libre	390 km	6h 24m	(Italy) Giuseppe Campari	Alfa Romeo 40/60	Report
28 Aug	(United States) Elgin National Trophy	Elgin, Illinois	AAA	250 miles	3h 10m	(United States) Ralph DePalma	Ballot	Report
28 Aug	(France) II Grand Prix de l’UMF	Le Mans	Voiturette	275 km	3h 37m	(France) Marcel Violet	Major	Report
29 Aug	(France) VIII Coupe des Voiturettes	Le Mans	Voiturette	410 km	4h 28m	(France) Ernest Friderich	Bugatti Type 13	Report
24 Oct	(Italy) XI Targa Florio	Medio Madonie	Targa Florio	430 km	8h 27m	(Italy) Guido Meregalli	Nazzaro GP	Report

== Regulations and technical ==
At the end of 1919 the AIACR (forerunner of the FIA) had set down new regulations for motor-racing. An engine limit of 3.0-litres was imposed along with a minimum weight of 800kg. The AAA also adopted those regulations for their racing season. So, in line with this, the Indianapolis regulations also changed – with the maximum engine size reduced to 183 cu in (3.0 litres) from 300 cu in (4.92 litres). The Targa Florio regulations were for production cars available to the public, divided into seven engine-capacity categories. Voiturette regulations were set at a maximum of 1400cc capacity engine, and weighing between 350 and 500kg.

The general unification of regulations encouraged manufacturers to build new designs that could run on both sides of the Atlantic. The new Peugeot had an intricate triple-overhead cam 3-litre engine with five valves per cylinder. As it would turn out, after a decade of leading racing development, this would be the last grand prix car designed and built by Peugeot. Ernest Henry followed up his Indianapolis design for Ballot with a new car with a 3-litre straight-eight engine.

Louis Chevrolet, as well as building a new Frontenac, was engaged by Indianapolis industrialist William Small, of the Monroe Motor Car Company, to build four 3-litre specials.

In June, Sunbeam, bought out the French Talbot and British-owned Darracq companies, setting up the headquarters of the new company, STD Motors, in Paris.

Manufacturer	Model	Engine	Power Output	Max. Speed (km/h)	Dry Weight (kg)
(France) Peugeot		Peugeot 3.0L S4	105 bhp	165	1000
(France) Ballot	3-Litre	Ballot 3.0L S8	108 bhp	180	920
(United States) Duesenberg	GP	Duesenberg 3.0L S8	115 bhp	185	1160
(United States) Frontenac	-Monroe	Frontenac 3.0L S4	98 bhp	165	1060
(United States) Frontenac		Frontenac 3.0L S4	120 bhp	185	1020

== Season review ==
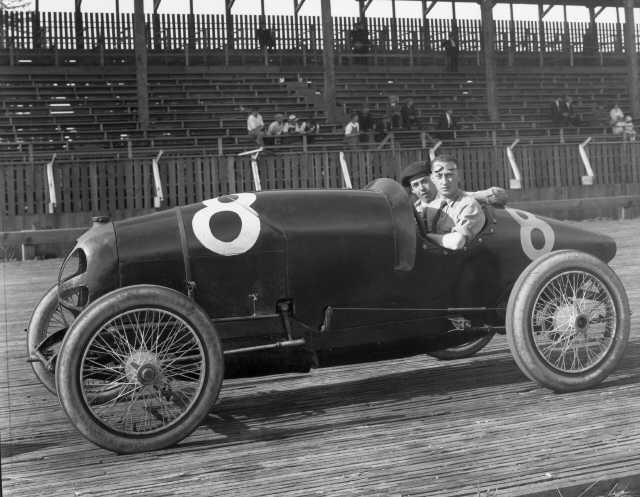
Frontenac (Art Klein at Tacoma)

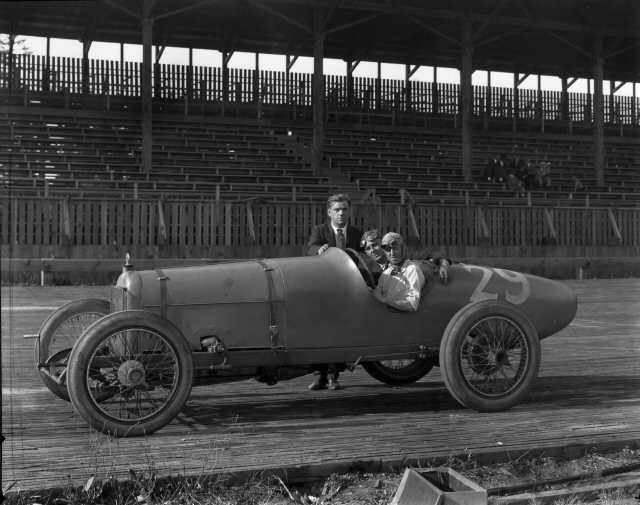
Duesenberg (Eddie O'Donnell at Tacoma)

With a $20000 first prize, and lucrative bonuses, a strong field was entered for the International Sweepstakes. It essentially turned out to be a showdown between two French and two American teams. Works teams arrived from Ballot and Peugeot, both with their new 3-litre cars and strong driver line-ups. Ballot had former winners René Thomas and Ralph DePalma with Jean Chassagne. Peugeot had current holder Howdy Wilcox with Jules Goux and André Boillot. There were five Monroe-Frontenacs present. The four ‘works’ team cars were driven by Louis and Gaston Chevrolet, Roscoe Sarles and Joe Thomas, as well as three cars from the Frontenac factory (Joe Boyer, Art Klein, Bennett Hill). There were also four new 3-litre Duesenberg cars entered for their team – to be driven by Tommy Milton, Eddie Hearn, Eddie O'Donnell and a rookie Jimmy Murphy.

This year, a new qualifying system was used with a four lap, 10-mile, time taken. A record crowd of 120000 arrived on race day. Ralph DePalma had been fastest, sharing the front row with the two Chevrolet brothers. But he lost all advantage when Barney Oldfield, in the pace-car left the line early before he was ready. Then a tyre problem lost the veteran driver a lap straight away. This left Boyer to set the early pace from his team-mate Klein, Gaston Chevrolet and the Ballots of Thomas and Chassagne, though Thomas briefly took the lead during the pit-stops. The Monroes and Frontenacs were then affected by the same issue: Klein slid into the wall on lap 58, then Sarles and Louis Chevrolet did the same. They were traced to badly cast steering arms. Then Sarles then took over Hill's Frontenac but the same fault spun him out – this time right in front of the Ballots of Thomas and Chassagne who narrowly avoided him.

By the halfway point DePalma had not only made back the lap but overtaken Boyer to lead. The race built up to a dramatic finish. DePalma was leading from Chevrolet, with Chassagne and Thomas close behind. Then with thirteen laps to go, DePalma's engine caught fire. In the pits he found a faulty magneto was leaving unspent fuel in the cylinders. He rejoined the race in fifth, running on four cylinders. A few laps later, the steering arm on Boyer's Frontenac broke, then in his pursuit of Chevrolet, Chassagne hit the wall. With the pressure off, Gaston Chevrolet held on to win by six minutes from the Ballot of Thomas, with Milton and his Duesenberg barely ten seconds back in third. DePalma was fifth, thirty minutes behind and Chassagne seventh. All the Peugeots had retired. Chevrolet had got through the race without taking a single tyre-change, and his Monroe-Frontenac was the first win by an American car at Indianapolis since 1912.

On 25 November, Gaston Chevrolet and Eddie O'Donnell collided when racing at the last race of the championship, at the new Beverly Hills Speedway. Both drivers were killed. Chevrolet's win at Indianapolis gave him sufficient points to be posthumously awarded the AAA championship from Tommy Milton in the abbreviated season of five races. For a long while Milton had been named as champion when a revision had been made for an eleven-race season. But further research showed that, at the time, the AAA had indeed only proscribed the five races in their championship.

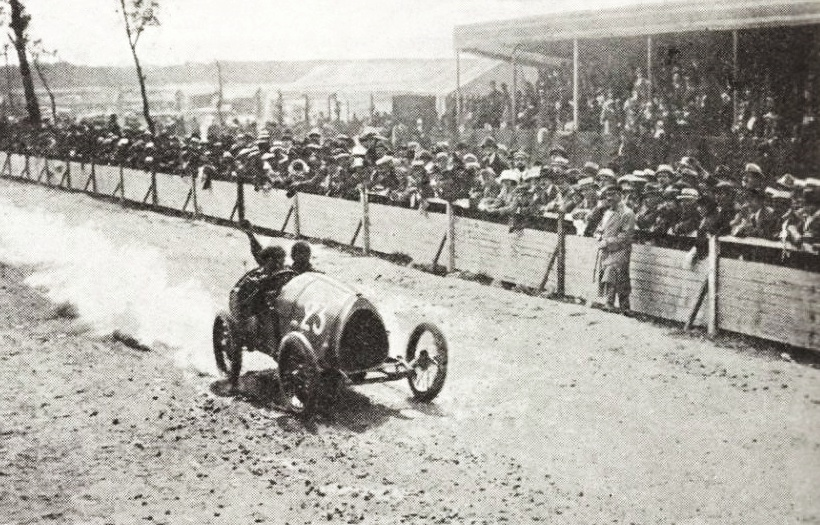
Ernest Friderich, winning the Coupe des Voiturettes

Motorsport was gradually returning to Europe. Racing restarted at Brooklands in April with its Easter Handicap, won by Malcolm Campbell. At the end of August, a meeting was held at Le Mans for smaller cars - le Meeting de la Reprise - with a race for cyclecars on the Saturday and another for voiturettes up to 1400cc on Sunday. With limited finance, the ACO could not afford to repair their former long course used from 1911 to 1913. So a far shorter 17km course based on a portion of it was set up. This would subsequently be used for the classic 24 Hours of Le Mans.

Twenty-two cars were entered, including works teams from Bugatti, Bignan, Majola and Eric-Campbell (who had René Thomas as a driver). From the start, the Bugatti team was dominant. Pierre de Vizcaya, Ernest Friderich and Michele Baccoli moved straight into the top-three places. De Vizcaya was comfortably leading when he came in for his last fuel stop. However, Ettore Bugatti in his enthusiasm, checked the car's water thereby getting his driver disqualified for outside assistance. This left Friderich to inherit the lead, and winning by a margin of 20 minutes from the Bignans of Nougue and Delauney.

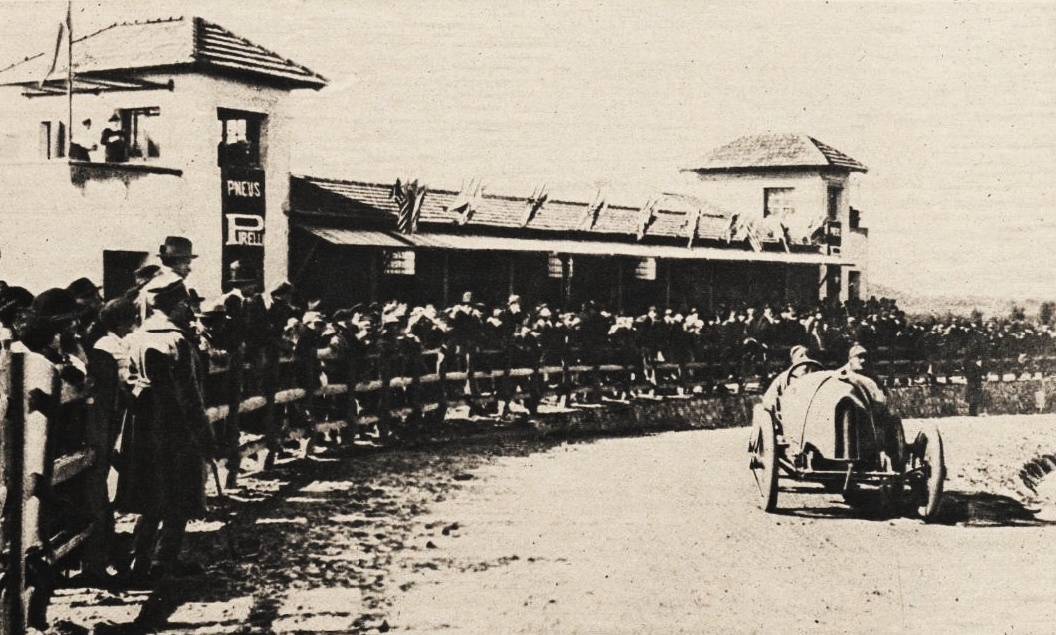
Guido Meregalli in his Nazzaro at the Targa Florio

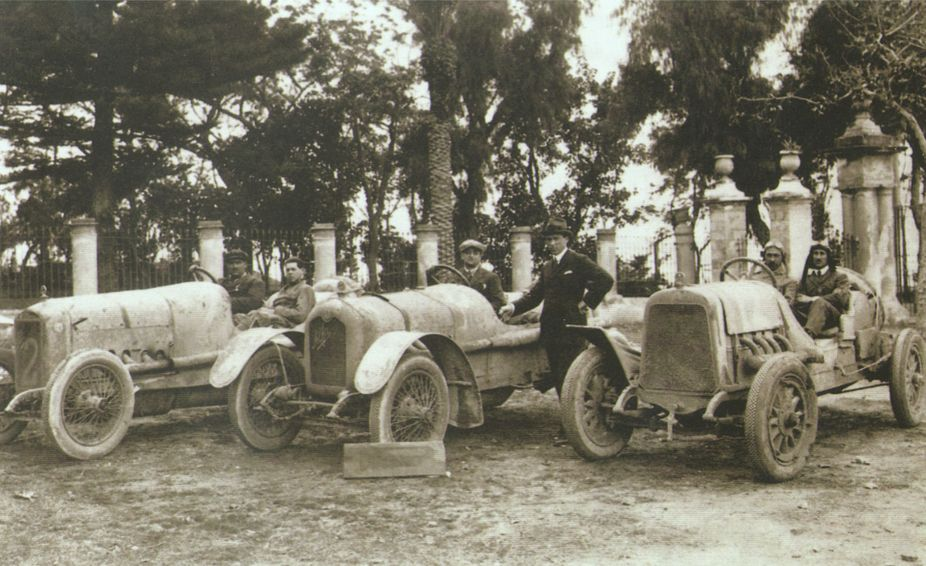
Alfa Romeo team for the Targa Florio: Campari, Ferrari, Baldoni

Although this year's Targa Florio only attracted sixteen Italian starters, it was significant as it drew the attention of the new Alfa Romeo works team, Alfa Corse. Three cars were sent: a 1914 Grand prix car for Giuseppe Campari, a big 40/60 6-litre for newly signed Enzo Ferrari and a smaller 20/30 for Giuseppe Baldoni. Earlier in the year, Campari had won the inaugural road-race held around Mugello in Tuscany. The Targa entry list also included the Contessa Maria-Antoinetta d’Avanzo in an American Buick, a pioneer among women in motorsport.

Held again as four laps of the 108km medio Madonie, the drivers once more had to battle heavy rain and high winds. Although Ferrari put in the fastest lap, he was beaten to the victory by Guido Meregalli in a Nazzaro. Only seven cars finished, with the final driver completing the race over three hours behind Meregalli.

Citations
