= Guido Meregalli =

Italian racing driver (1894–1959)

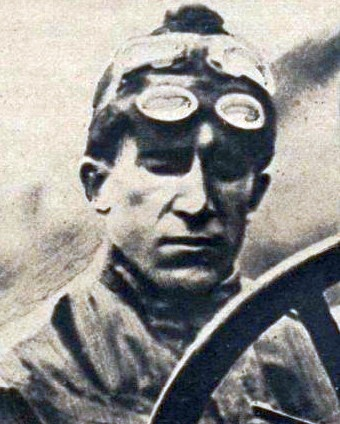
Meregalli in 1920

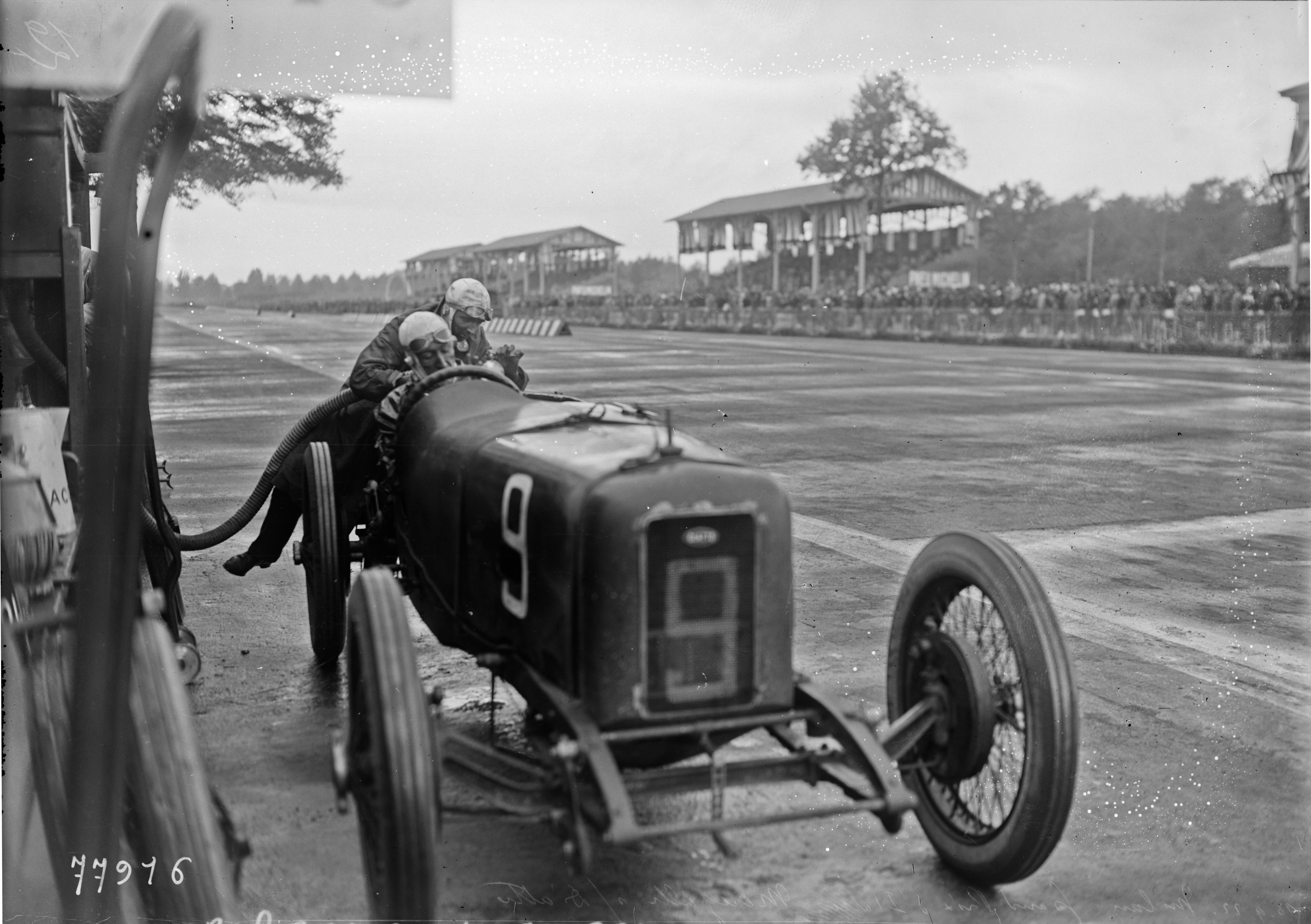
Meregalli at the 1922 Italian Grand Prix

Guido Meregalli (1894 – 1959) was an Italian racing driver, known from several GP victories between 1920 and 1926.

He had victories in the 1920 Grand Prix season, winning the Targa Florio 1920 in a 4.4-litre Nazzaro GP. Driving a Diatto alongside Alfieri Maserati, he won the Circuito del Garda race three years in a row, the 1922 Grand Prix season in a Tipo 20 (2-litre, four-cylinder), 1923 and 1924 in a Tipo 20S. At the VI Coppa Florio 1922, he was leading in the Diatto GP305 when he crashed, killing his mechanic Giuseppe Giacchino. The immediate follower, Henry Segrave gave first aid and helped out. Switching to Maserati, Meregalli failed to finish in the 1926 Italian Grand Prix, driving a Tipo 26 (1.5-litre, eight-cylinder).
