= Wiener Neustädter Lokomotivfabrik =

Locomotive and engineering factory

- Industry: Rail industry
- Founder: Günther Wenzel and others
- Fate: destroyed by bombs
- Headquarters: Wiener Neustadt, Austria
- Key people: Georg Sigl
- Products: Steam locomotives

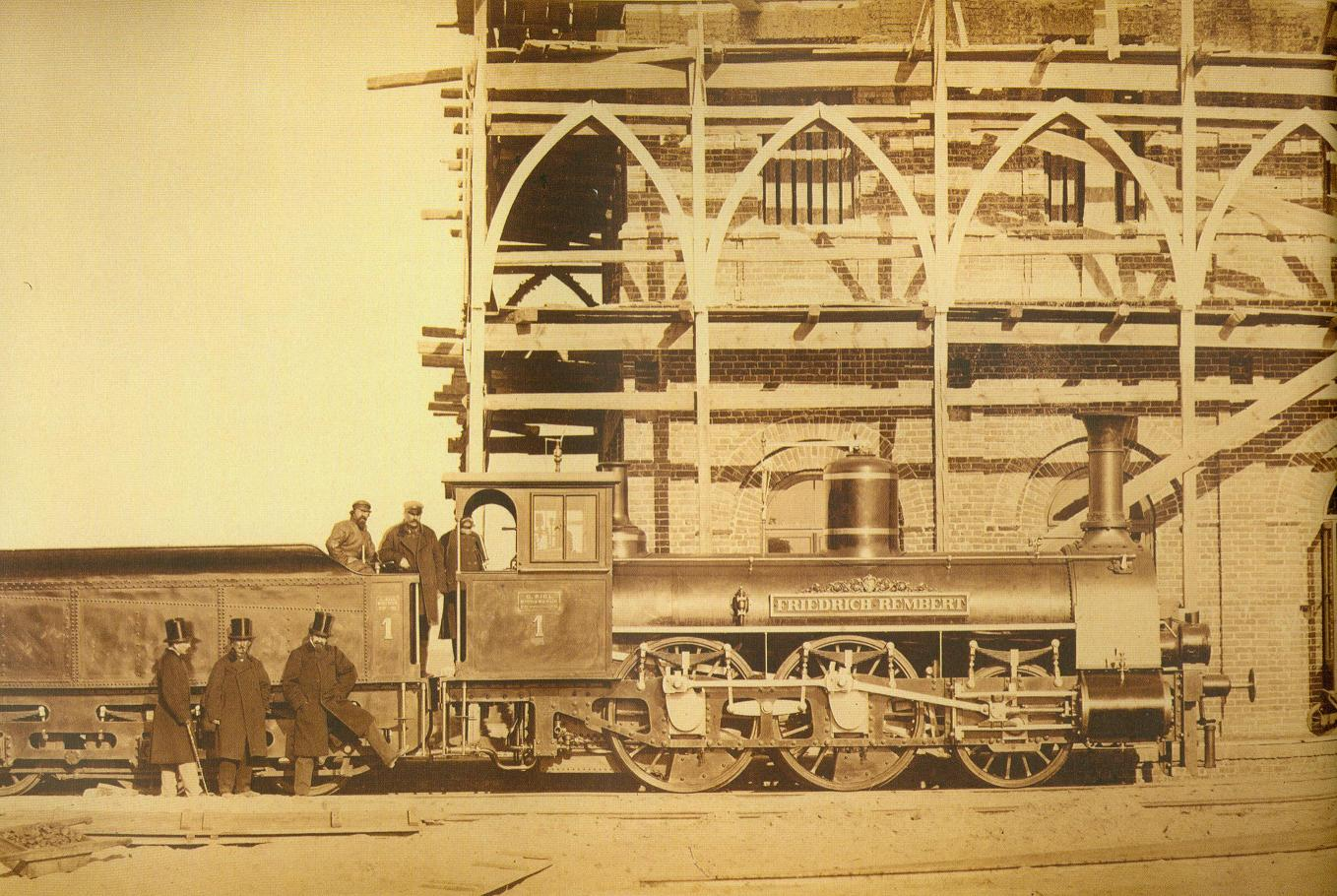
1865 locomotive "Friedriech Rembert" built by Sigl for the Warsaw–Terespol Railway.

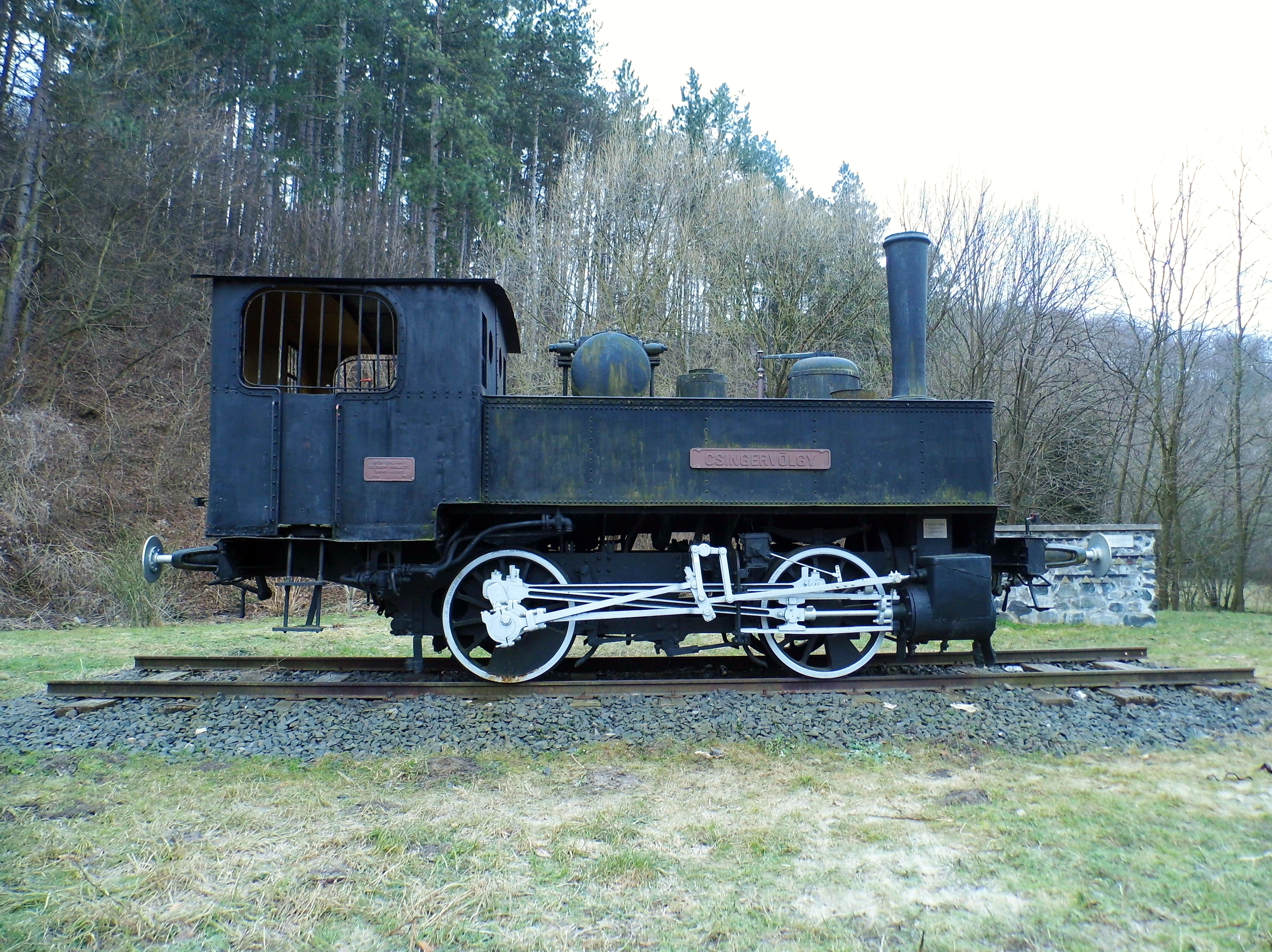
1890 locomotive Csingervölgy in Csingervölgy, Ajka, Hungary

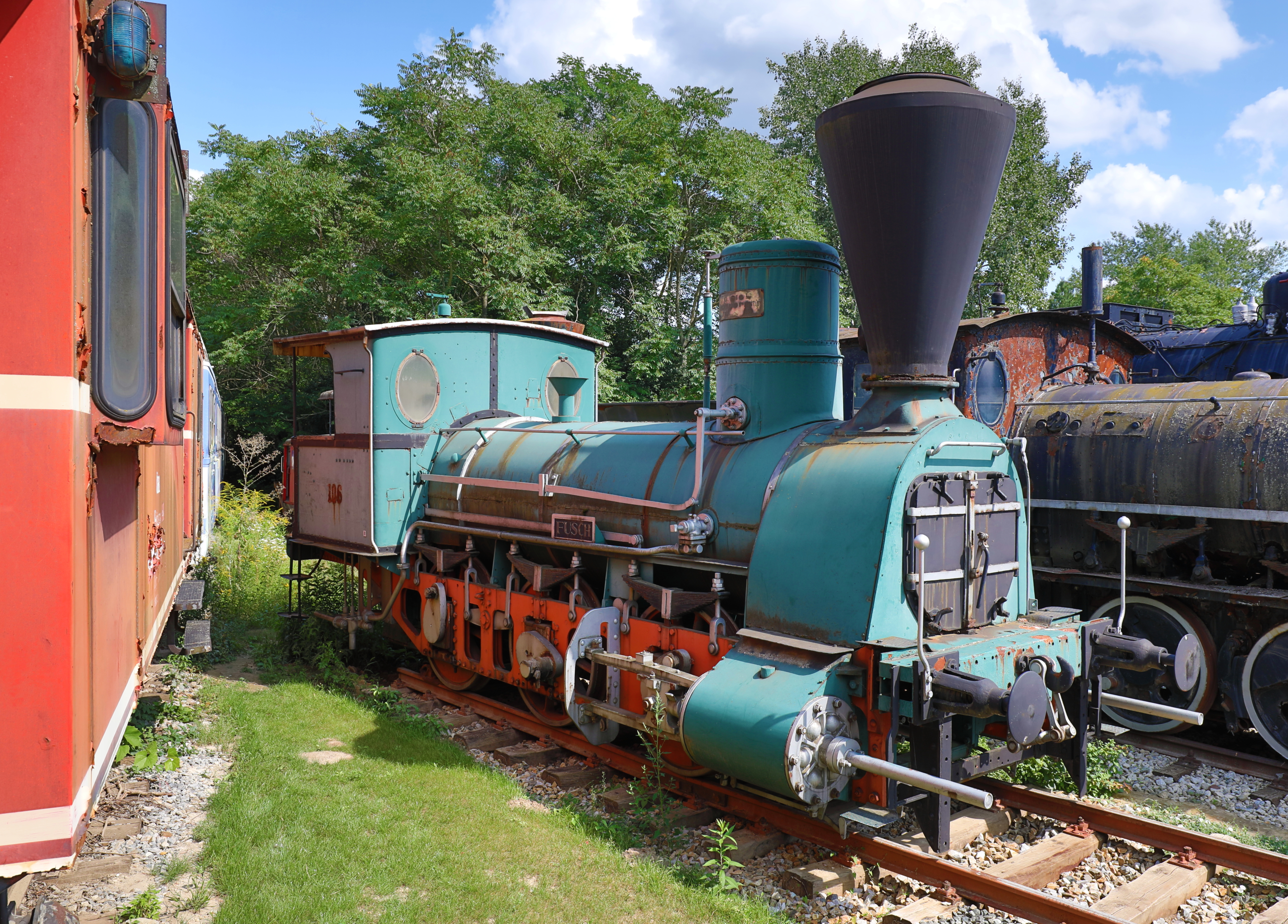
1868 locomotive "Fusch" (KEB IV 106) - build for the Empress Elisabeth Railway

The Wiener Neustädter Lokomotivfabrik (Wiener Neustadt locomotive factory) was the largest locomotive and engineering factory in the Austro-Hungarian Empire. During World War II the company produced armaments as part of Rax-Werk Ges.mbH which was associated with the Mauthausen concentration camp.

== History ==
In 1841 the Wiener Neustadt-Vienna railway line was open, and in 1842 the private railway Austrian Eastern Railway (Wien-Raaber-Eisenbahn or Raaber Bahn) was opened, by 1854 the Semmering railway was complete. Thus around that time a favourable situation existed for the creation of a locomotive production facility in Austria.

In 1842 in Wiener Neustadt a locomotive works was founded by Günther Wenzel, engineer of the Wien-Raaber-Eisenbahn company, the ironworks-master Josef Sessler, Heinrich Bühler and Fidelius Armbruster. The plant was built on land to the north-east of Wiener Neustadt in part on an abandoned cotton factory, and partly on a rifle and metal finishing plant.

=== Sale to Georg Sigl ===
From 1845 the company was wholly owned by Wenzel Gunther; it was sold in 1861 to the Vienna Maschinenfabrik owner Georg Sigl who expanded it into the largest plant in the Empire. By 1870 the 1000th locomotive had been made and the workforce exceeded 4000. The product line was expanded to include printing presses and other machinery. In 1875, the company became an Aktiengesellschaft (public company) named Aktien Gesellschaft der Lokomotiv-Fabrik vormals G. Sigl

=== Austrian labor movement ===
The Wiener Neustadt Lokomotivfabrik played an early role in the Austrian labor movement; as a result of the March revolution of 1848 (Märzrevolution) a 10-hour day was introduced, but was withdrawn by and for the workers, but they were withdrawn in the course of counter-revolution. In 1865, the first Austrian Workers' Association was established in the locomotive works of Wiener Neustadt.

=== 1914–1938 ===
The tornado of 10 July 1916 destroyed much of the locomotive works. (see Tornado in Wiener Neustadt 1916 german language) The workers became involved in the 1918 Austro-Hungarian January Strike alongside the more numerous workers at nearby Austro Daimler.

The loss of crown lands by Austria after the First World War caused a great loss of production and as a consequence the workforce was reduced to a few hundred men.

The Great Depression and the overcapacity of four extant Austrian locomotive works now much reduced domestic market meant that 1930, the company ended in the hands of the Österreichischen Credit-Anstalt.

=== 1938–1945 ===
After the Austrian Anschluss in 1938 the factory was taken over by the German company Henschel & Son. To increase production of locomotives the factory was greatly expanded.

From 5 May 1942 the former locomotive factory went by the pseudonym Rax Ges.mbH. and from 1943 the A4 (V-2) missiles were made at the factory. The facilities were completely destroyed in 1945 by air bombings.

== See also ==
- Wiener Neustadt World War II bombings
- Lokomotivfabrik Floridsdorf
- Lokomotivfabrik der StEG

== References and sources ==
=== Literature ===
- Franz Pincolits: Die Dampflokomotive. Geschichte der Wiener Neustäder Lokomotivfabrik. Weilburg Verlag, Wiener Neustadt.
- Peter Zumpf, Richard Heinersdorff: Lokomotivfabrik Wiener Neustadt. Album Verlag für Photographie Helfried Seemann and Christian Lunzer OEG, Vienna 2008; ISBN 978-3-85164-151-6.
