= Reinhold Stahl =

German pre-World War 2 racing driver

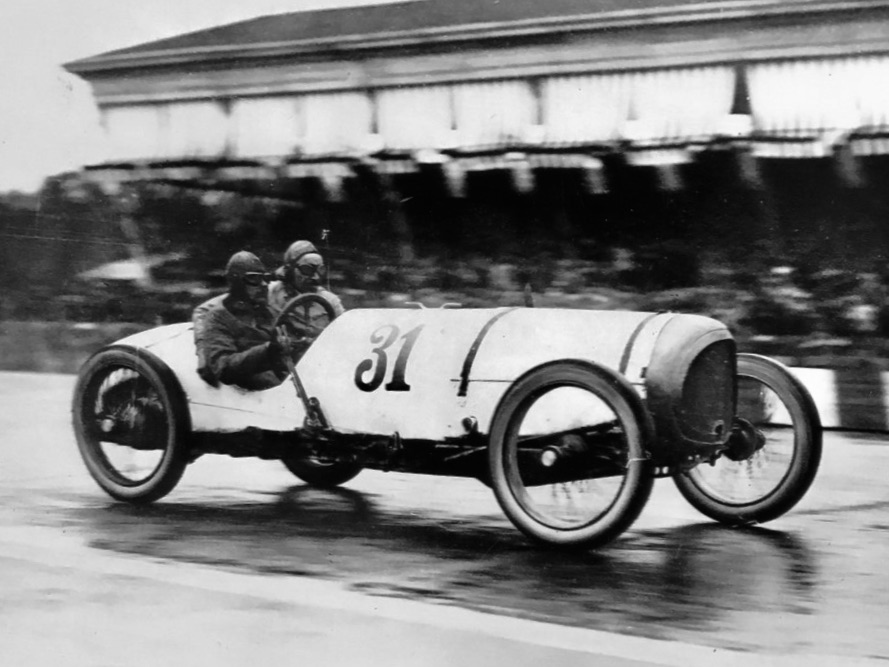
At the 1922 Italian Grand Prix

Reinhold Stahl was a German car engineer and Grand Prix driver.

== Career ==
The Mannheim-born engineer had been a riding mechanic for Benz from 1909, including at the Kaiser Nicholas Tourenfahrt in 1910 from St Petersburg to Kyiv and back, via Moscow, and the Prince Heinrich touring car races in 1910 and 1912; he also took the wheel in the 1912 Tour de France Automobile. After the First World War, he was one of many Benz employees who followed Franz Heim to his new company, Badische Automobilfabrik Heim & Cie.

Stahl took part in two Grandes Epreuves. He drove for Heim in the 1922 Italian Grand Prix, retiring after a handful of off-the-pace laps, and the 1924 Targa Florio driving for A.G.A., retiring on the fourth lap while 26th out of 28.
