= Austro-Hungarian strike of January 1918 =

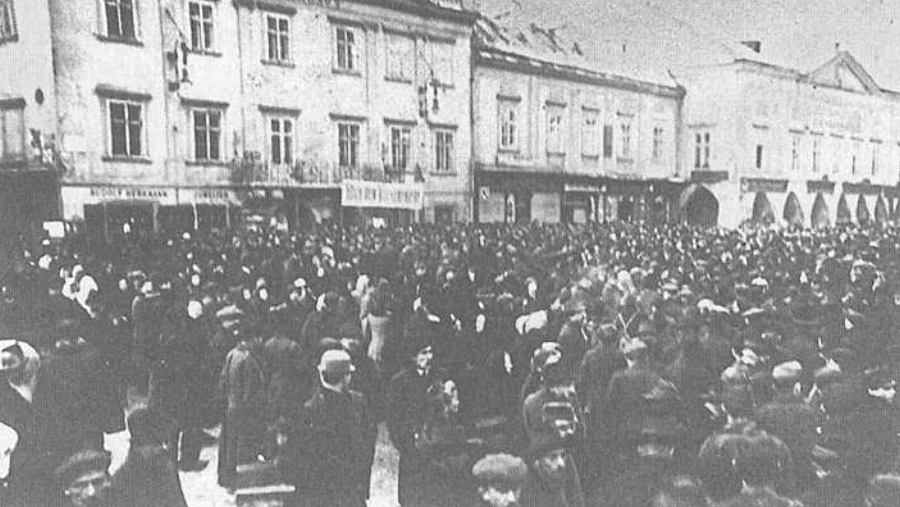
Striking workers assembling outside the Town Hall, Wiener Neustadt, 14 January 1918

The Austro-Hungarian strike of January 1918 was a strike which spread across Austria-Hungary between January 3 and 25, 1918 demanding better living and working conditions and an end to World War I. It is known as the "Jännerstreik" as opposed to the "Januarstreik" – a similar strike movement which lasted from 25 January to 1 February 1918 in Germany – Jänner being the usual spelling for January in Austria.

== Prelude ==
There had been strikes in early 1917 by Viennese workers in response to food shortages. However by winter 1917, the situation had got worse. However news of the Bolshevik seizure of power in Russia encouraged workers in Vienna and more generally across Europe to emulate their example with the demand that the war be ended or more strikes would be organised. The leadership of the Sozialdemokratische Arbeiterpartei Österreichs (SDAPÖ) was slow to react although the youth wing of the party started to organise and local sections also prepared for action. In early January the party took a clearer anti-war position, particularly in relation to the Brest-Litovsk negotiations and convened three large meetings in Vienna on Sunday 13 January. On 6 January, a demonstration by 4,000 angry Hungarian workers in Budapest occurred outside the German Consulate. They actively supported the peace plan of the Bolshevik negotiator, Adolph Joffe, and several windows of the consulate were smashed. By 13 January, the three large meetings had grown to five and the topic was "The Peace Negotiation in Brest-Litovsk and Social Democracy". Ellenbogen, Domes and Karl Renner delivered speeches in which they said that a victorious peace was impossible. However they were heckled by workers calling out "Long Live the Austrian Revolution".

== The strike begins ==
When the flour ration was halved on 14 January 1918 the workers in Wiener Neustadt, particularly the 4,500 working for Austro-Daimler downed tools and went on strike. The strike soon spread to the nearby Wiener Neustädter Lokomotivfabrik and through factories in Lower Austria and to the Lokomotivfabrik Floridsdorf which employed over 1,000 workers in Vienna. By 18 January, over 110,000 of the total Viennese workforce of 350,000-370,000 people were on strike. From the strike meetings workers' councils were established as a form of participatory democracy. The executive of the Sozialdemokratische Arbeiterpartei Österreichs (SDAPÖ) had drawn up a list of demands to be presented to the government. These were accepted by the workers' council. On 19 January, Workers' Council received a delegation led by Count Ottokar Czernin, the Minister of Foreign Affairs who promised that territorial demands would not jeopardise the peace negotiations. The Minister-president, Ernst Seidler von Feuchtenegg promised to reform the war benefits and to establish a food service and the democratisation of municipal election law. In a turbulent session during the night of 19–20 January, the Workers' Council accepted the SDAPÖ proposal to call the workforce to resume work on Monday, January 21.

== The strike in Hungary ==
The strike was started by Budapest Tram workers on the morning of 18 January. They were protesting about the ban on reports of the events in Austria. By noon the strike had spread across all industries, and 40,000 workers took part in fifteen different demonstrations which were prevented by the police from converging on the centre of Budapest. The Hungarian Social Democratic Party declared a general strike. The following day the strike spread to Nagykanizsa and Szeged.

== Literature ==
- Borislav Chernev. The Great January Strike as a Prelude to Revolution in Austria // Twilight of Empire: The Brest-Litovsk Conference and the Remaking of East-Central Europe, 1917—1918. — University of Toronto Press, 2017. — PP. 107—152 — 328 p. — ISBN 9781487513351. — ISBN 1487513356. — ISBN 9781487501495. — ISBN 1487501498.
