= Album Verlag =

Austrian publishing company

Founded in 1991 in Vienna by Christian Lunzer and Helfried Seemann, the Album Verlag publishing house originally dealt only with photography. Through the processing and publication of historical photography, the publishing house built up a picture archive on Austrian photographic history.

In 2014, the management of the publishing house went to the art dealer Simon Weber-Unger, who continued the expansion of the portfolio that had already begun.

Today, books from the fields of art, historical technology, biographies and many others are published.

The publishing house is best known for its 23 photo books of the 23 districts of Vienna with historical images.
