= Selve =

Automobile manufacturer in Germany

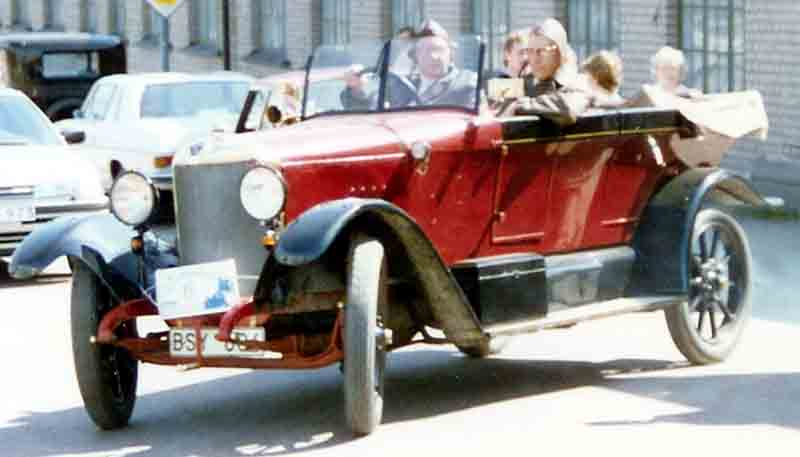
Selve SL 6/24 PS Doppelphaeton 1920

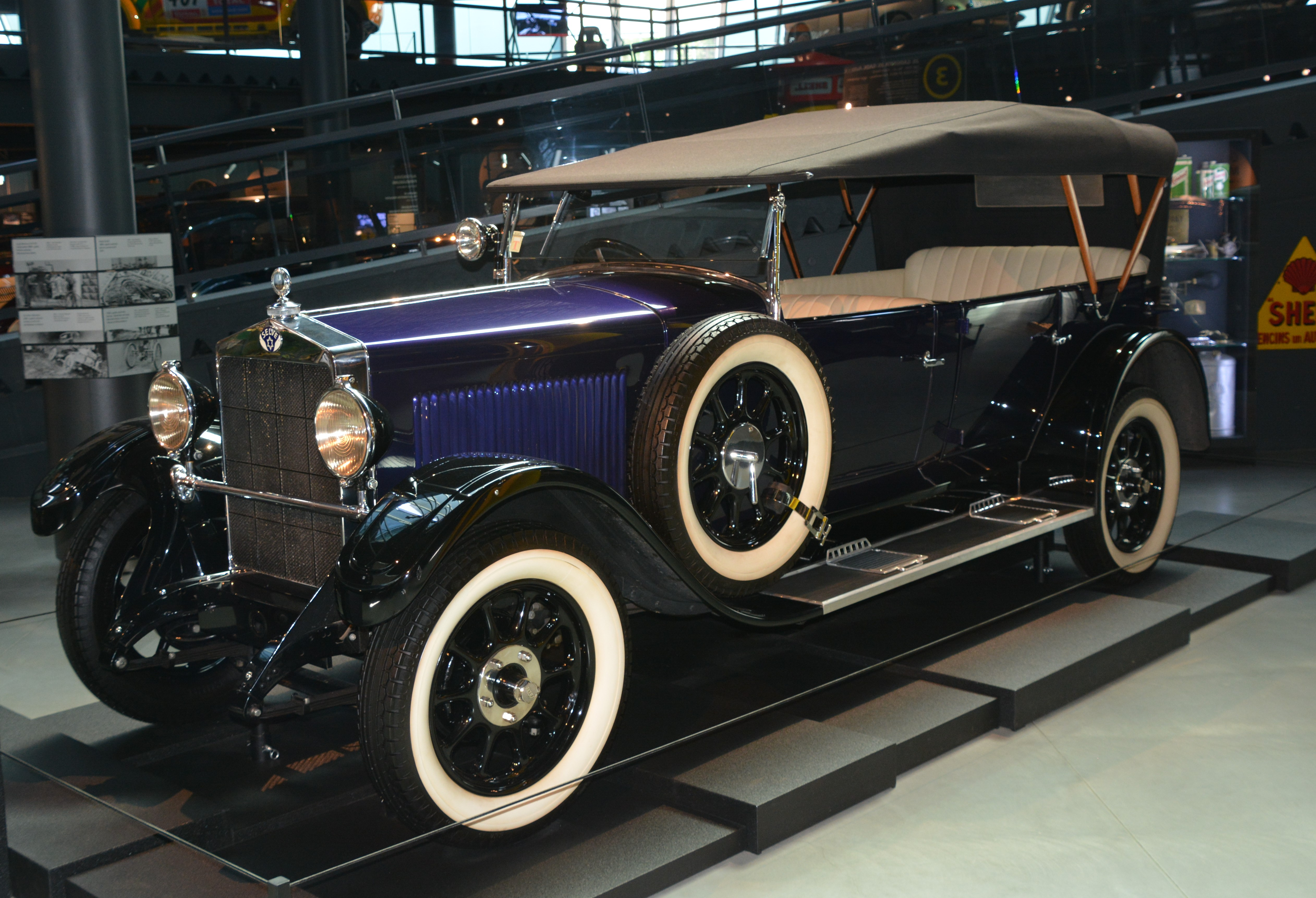
Selve 12/50 (1928)

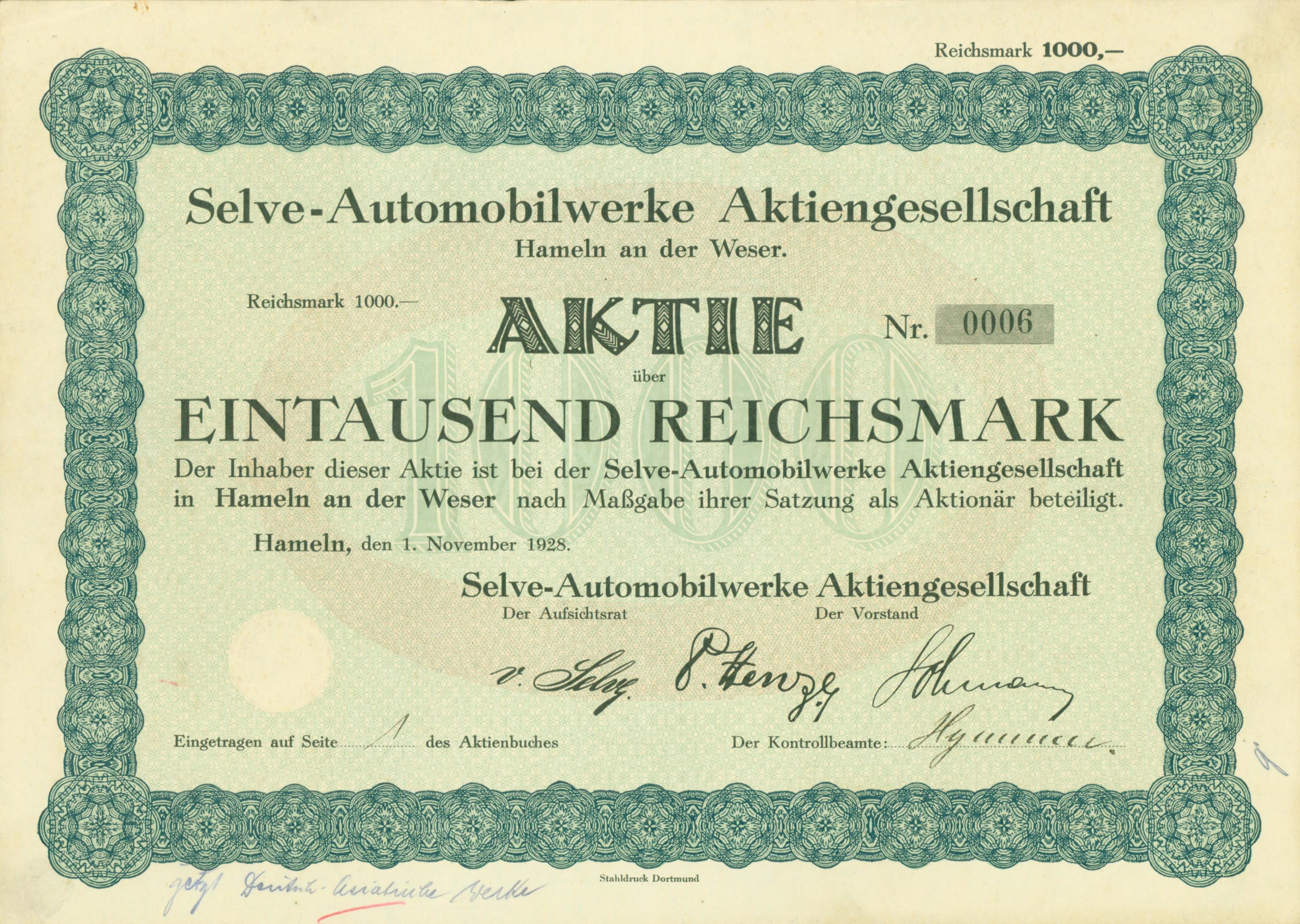
Share of the Selve-Automobilwerke AG, issued 1. November 1928

Selve Automobilwerke AG was a car maker located in Hameln (near Hannover, Germany).

After World War I, the Northern German Automobile Works (Norddeutsche Automobilwerke), which made the Colibri car and the Sperber, was absorbed by the Selve firm, which was already producing Basse & Selve engines for the automotive industry. The first cars produced were the 24 horsepower 1.5 litre engine displacement and the 32 horsepower 2 litre model. The 40 hp 2090 cc model (which was later carried over to the 40 hp and 2352 cc) was also available in a 65 hp (48 kW) sport version. Six-cylinder models of 2850 cc in engine displacement were produced in 1925 and the Selecta 3075 cc engine produced in 1927 completed the product line.

Adolf Hitler was a fan of the automobile mark in the 1920s having a Green Selve 6/20 in which he was chauffeured around by his adjutant Julius Schaub.

The Selve 12/50 with a six-cylinder engine of 3097 cc with a bore of 74 mm and a stroke of 120 mm produced 50 hp. The top speed was 90 km/h. The fuel consumption was 15 liters per 100 km. The wheelbase was 3250 mm with an overall length of about 4500 mm. The track width was 1340 mm. As a convertible, the empty weight was 1400 kg, and as a closed six-seater, it was 1600 kg.

These automobiles were produced until 1929, when car manufacturing was suspended due to the economic crisis of 1929.

A front-wheel drive six-cylinder model designed by Paul Henze was shown at the 1928 Berlin Automobile Exposition, but was never put into production.
