= Austro-Daimler Sascha =

Early racing car engineered by Ferdinand Porsche

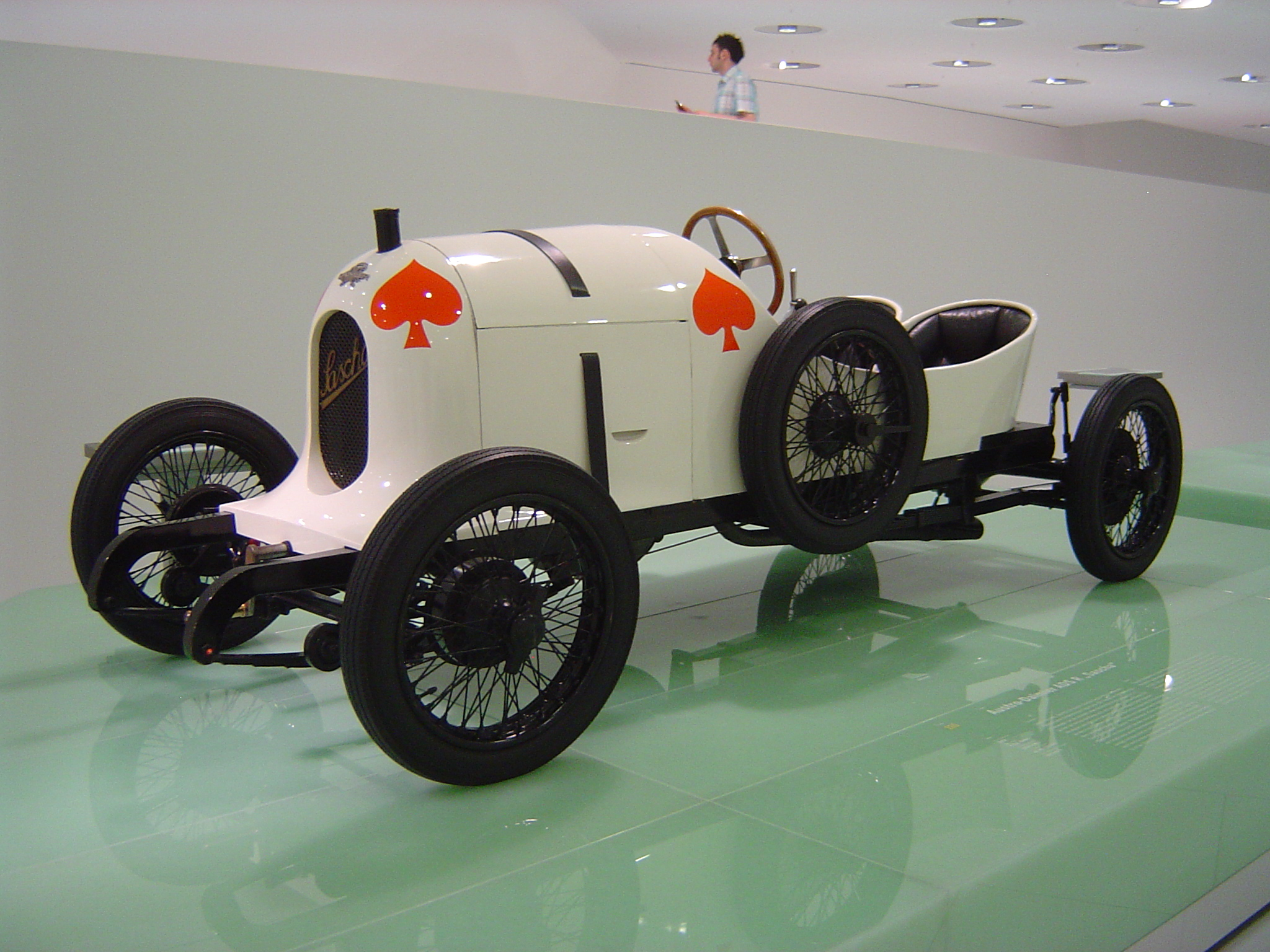
A Sascha in the Porsche Museum

The Austro-Daimler Sascha (also called ADS-R,Sascha or Sascha Porsche) is a car from 1922. It was designed by Ferdinand Porsche. The car was named for Sascha Kolowrat-Krakowsky, who financed the project after Austro-Daimler refused to.

Three Saschas were in the 1922 Targa Florio in Sicily: three in the 1.1 liter class, (one, driven by Kolowrat, quit due to engine trouble), and one with a 1.5l engine which placed 19th in the open class against larger cars with more horsepower.

== Bibliography ==
- Wood, J (1997). Porsche:The Legend. Parragon. ISBN 0-7525-2072-5.
