= 1923 French Grand Prix =

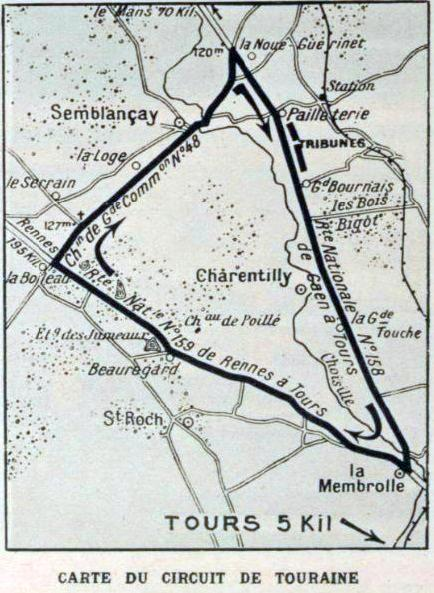

Race details
- Date: 2 July 1923
- Official name: XVII Grand Prix de l'Automobile Club de France
- Location: Tours, France
- Course: Public roads
- Course length: 22.83 km (14.19 miles)
- Distance: 35 laps, 799.07 km (496.52 miles)

Pole position
| Driver | (France) René Thomas | Delage |
- Grid positions set by ballot

Fastest lap
| Driver | (Italy) Pietro Bordino | Fiat |
- Time: 9:36.0

Podium
| First | (United Kingdom) Henry Segrave | Sunbeam |
| Second | (France) Albert Divo | Sunbeam |
| Third | (France) Ernest Friderich | Bugatti |

The 1923 French Grand Prix (formally the XVII Grand Prix de l'Automobile Club de France) was a Grand Prix motor race held at Tours on 2 July 1923. The race was run over 35 laps of the 22.83 km circuit for a total distance of just under 800 km and was won by Henry Segrave driving a Sunbeam. This race is notable as the first Grand Épreuve to be won by either a British driver or a British car. The race also featured several innovative new technologies, including the first appearance of both supercharging and V12 engines in Grand Prix racing.

== Entries ==
Four French manufacturers entered the Grand Prix in 1923. Based locally in Tours, Rolland-Pilain entered three cars, two of which were improved versions of the straight eights raced in 1922 and the third was one of last year's chassis fitted with a new straight six to be driven by Jules Goux but it did not start. Bugatti entered their new highly slipstreamed Tank model based on the Type 30, featuring an all–enveloping body. While this gave superior aerodynamic efficiency, the bodywork blocked the drivers' view of their tires, and the cars were also hampered by a short wheelbase and narrow track width on the fast, winding and bumpy circuit. Voisin entered four cars which also featured streamlined bodies, but with the front wheels exposed, and an innovative semi-monocoque body. Finally there was a single V12 engined Delage which featured a conventional body and chassis design but the engine was still being developed so it was surprising at the time that it arrived at all.

Just two other manufacturers fielded teams in 1923. The British Sunbeam team entered three cars very closely based on the Fiat 804s which won in 1922. Fiat themselves (from Italy), who were the last to arrive at the circuit, entered a team of three completely new cars featuring, for the first time in Grand Prix racing, a supercharged straight eight engine: the Fiat 805.

== Report ==
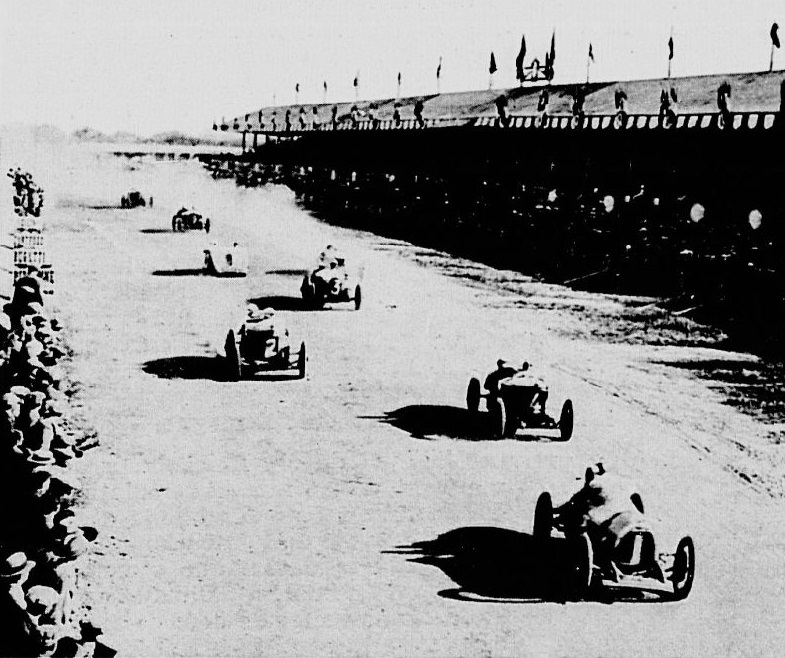
Start of the race.

The race began with a rolling start with René Thomas in the Delage, and Kenelm Lee Guinness in a Sunbeam on the front row (the order being determined by ballot). Immediately after the start, from the second row Fiat driver Pietro Bordino overtook first Guinness, then Thomas to take the early lead, completing his first lap in 9 minutes and 45 seconds, faster than any driver had done in practice, and already had a lead of 41 seconds over Guinness, followed at some distance by a close pack in the order Thomas, Enrico Giaccone (Fiat), Carlo Salamano (Fiat), Segrave (Sunbeam), Albert Divo (Sunbeam), Albert Guyot (Rolland-Pilain) and Ernest Friderich (Bugatti).

Overheating caused Thomas to drop back, while the two other Fiats moved up into third and fourth place. Segrave also dropped back during his third lap due to a slipping clutch, an issue which existed even for the start of the race due to an incorrectly adjusted clutch pedal. Divo began to challenge the Fiats, taking second place from Salamano on his fourth lap. Guyot also moved up the field, reaching sixth place on his fourth lap having passed Segrave. Bordino continued pushing, increasing his lead over Guinness to almost four minutes by the start of the eighth lap, who had himself continued to increase the gap back to the other two Fiats. However, on the eighth lap, Bordino suffered a supercharger failure, believed to be caused by the large amount of stones and other debris on the Tours circuit. This handed Guinness a healthy lead. Not long after Thomas retired the Delage which had not been expected to perform well for long due to it being an undeveloped design.

With Guinness leading the field, Divo's efforts the catch the Fiats had exhausted his riding mechanic, forcing him to stop for him to be replaced. This allowed Guyot into fourth place, defying early low expectations for the local Rolland-Pilains. At the end of lap 11, Segrave made a scheduled pit stop. His lead was enough that he rejoined the race still in first place, but Giaccone was very close behind. Giaccone took first place during lap 12, and clutch issues in Guinness' car dropped him all the way back to sixth place by lap 15, with the order then being Giaccone, Salamano, Divo, Guyot, Segrave, Guinness, Freidrich, with Henri Rougier in eighth place in the best placed Voisin.

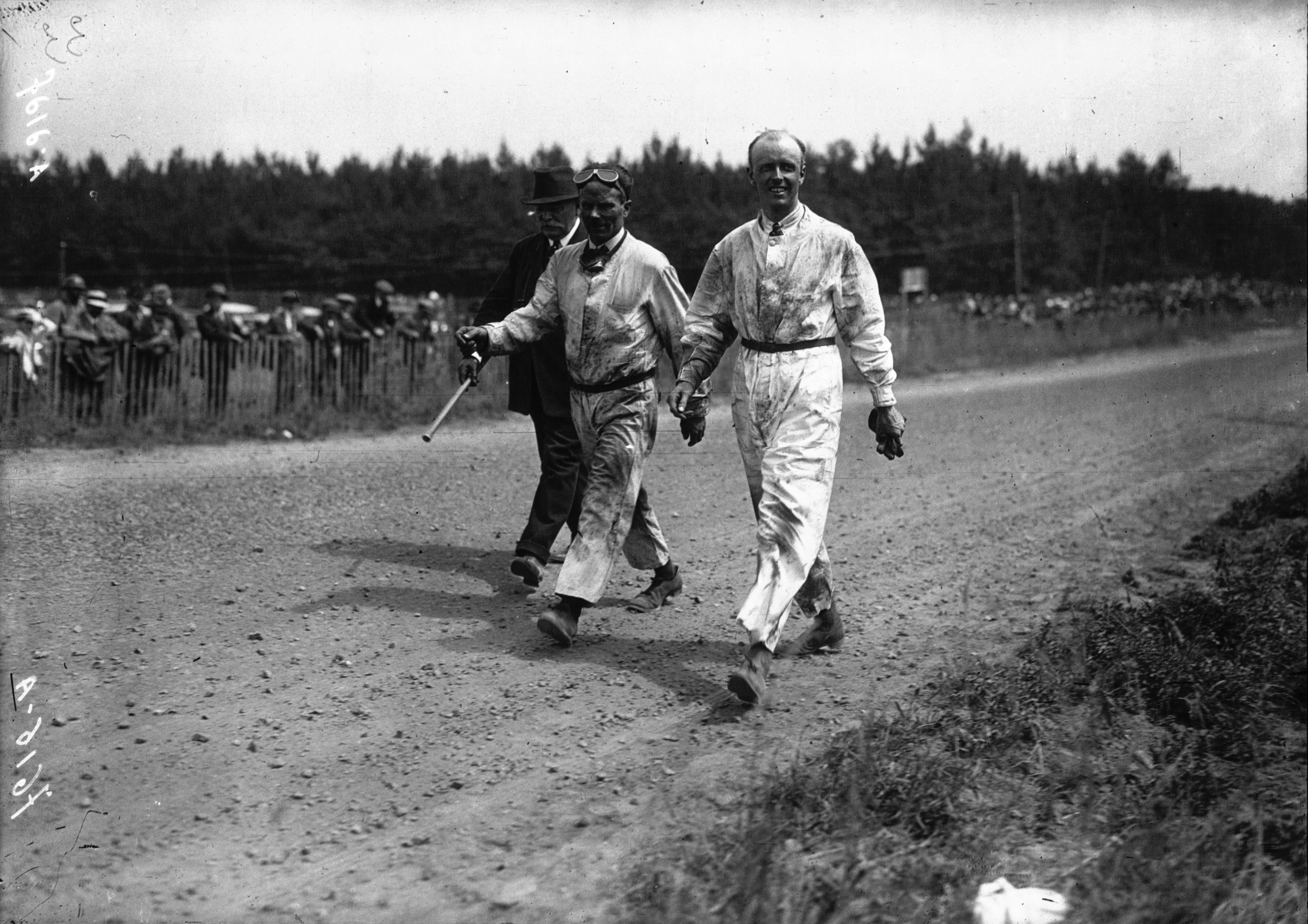
Segrave and his walking mechanic Paul Dutoit

Segrave had again started moving up through the field: the stop on his clutch pedal having worn off he was able to overtake the slowing Guyot. At the end of lap 16, both Fiats came to the pits. Giaccone had difficulty starting, his car sounded rough and would retire after completing one more lap with similar supercharger issues to Bordino. Salamano maintained first place but was quickly losing ground to Divo who took first place on lap 20. This was short lived, however, as Salamano retook the lead on the 23rd lap, building up a lead of over four minutes by the end of lap 30 over Divo and Segrave, with Guinness keeping the Sunbeam 2–3–4 nearly 30 minutes off of the lead, and less than three minutes ahead of Freidrich in the only remaining Bugatti. Guyot's race had ended after 28 laps, retiring whilst in fourth place and what could have eventually been a podium position. André Lefèbvre was a further 40 minutes behind Freidrich in the only remaining Voisin.

Divo stopped for fuel at the end of the 30th lap but jammed his filler cap. Having wasted over 15 minutes trying to fix the issue he decided to go on with just the reserve tank, forcing him to stop each lap for more fuel. Around the same time Divo set off again, with just two laps to go Salamano failed to appear past the pits when expected, with the next car through being Segrave, now just a lap behind Salamano. Eventually Salamano's mechanic appeared running towards the pits, with the car apparently out of fuel just a couple of miles from the pits. After a disagreement with officials about using a bicycle to return to the car, the mechanic eventually set off on foot, only to find that the issue in Salamano's Fiat was another supercharger failure. So with the race nearly over Sunbeam had a 1–2–3 finish in hand when on his final lap, Guinness stalled at the la Membrolle hairpin costing him over two minutes and allowing Freidrich through into third place. Lefêbvre was the last to finish, nearly 50 minutes behind fourth placed Guinness.

== Classification ==
| Pos | No | Driver | Car | Laps | Time/Retired |
|---|---|---|---|---|---|
| 1 | 12 | (United Kingdom) Henry Segrave | Sunbeam | 35 | 6h35m19.6 |
| 2 | 7 | (France) Albert Divo | Sunbeam | 35 | 6h54m25.8 |
| 3 | 6 | (France) Ernest Friderich | Bugatti 32 | 35 | 7h00m22.4 |
| 4 | 2 | (United Kingdom) Kenelm Lee Guinness | Sunbeam | 35 | 7h02m03.0 |
| 5 | 10 | (France) André Lefèbvre | Voisin C6 Laboratoire | 35 | 7h50m29.2 |
| Ret | 14 | (Italy) Carlo Salamano | Fiat 805-405 | 32 | Engine |
| Ret | 5 | (France) Arthur Duray | Voisin C6 Laboratoire | 29 | |
| Ret | 3 | (France) Albert Guyot | Rolland-Pilain A22 | 28 | |
| Ret | 15 | (France) Henri Rougier | Voisin C6 Laboratoire | 19 | |
| Ret | 9 | (Italy) Enrico Giaccone | Fiat 805-405 | 16 | Engine |
| Ret | 18 | (France) Prince de Cystria | Bugatti 32 | 12 | Retired |
| Ret | 1 | (France) René Thomas | Delage 2LCV | 8 | Fuel tank |
| Ret | 13 | (France) Victor Hémery | Rolland-Pilain A22 | 7 | Oil pump |
| Ret | 4 | (Italy) Pietro Bordino | Fiat 805-405 | 7 | Engine |
| Ret | 16 | (France) Pierre Marco | Bugatti 32 | 3 | |
| Ret | 11 | (Spain) Pierre de Vizcaya | Bugatti 32 | 0 | Crash |
| DSQ | 17 | (France) André Morel | Voisin C6 Laboratoire | 8 | Disqualified |
| DNS | 8 | (France) Jules Goux | Rolland-Pilain A22 | | Did not appear |

Grand Prix Race
| Previous race: 1923 Indianapolis 500 | 1923 Grand Prix season Grandes Épreuves | Next race: 1923 Italian Grand Prix |
| Previous race: 1922 French Grand Prix | French Grand Prix | Next race: 1924 French Grand Prix |
