= Bugatti Type 32 =

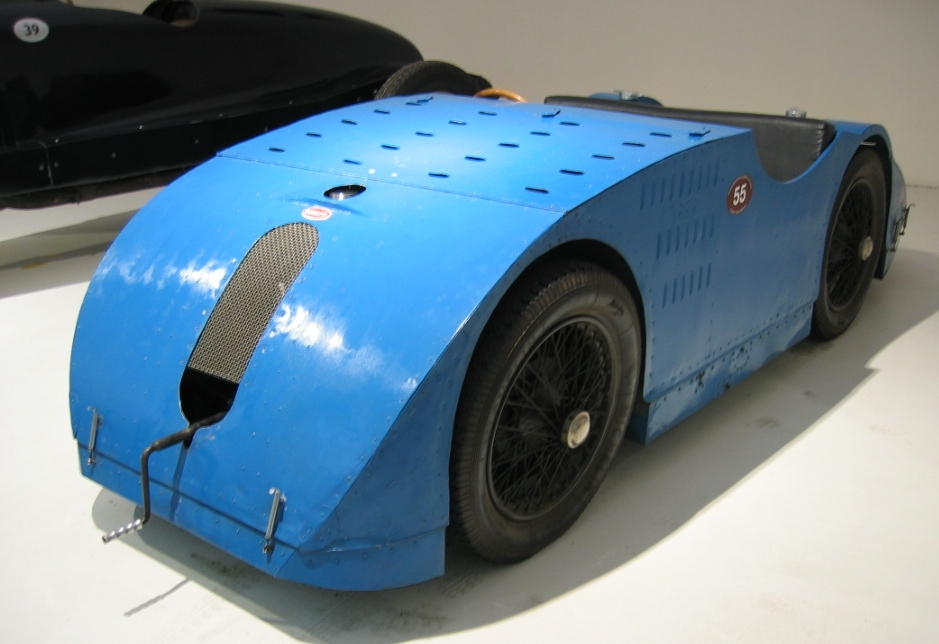

Overview
- Manufacturer: Automobiles Ettore Bugatti
- Production: 1923; 5 produced (1 prototype + 4 race-ready)
- Assembly: France: Molsheim-Dorlisheim, Alsace (Usine Bugatti de Molsheim)
- Designer: Ettore Bugatti

Body and chassis
- Class: Racing car, Formula Libre
- Body style: Underslug type
- Related: Type 57G

Powertrain
- Engine: 2.0 L (1991 cc/121 in³) straight-8 engine
- Transmission: 3-speed + reverse

Dimensions
- Wheelbase: 1994 mm
- Width: 1052 mm
- Curb weight: est. 650 kg

Chronology
- Predecessor: Bugatti Type 30
- Successor: Bugatti Type 35

The Bugatti Type 32, commonly called the Tank de Tours, was a streamlined racing car built in 1923. It was built to compete in the French Grand Prix, which was held on July 2 in Tours on the same year.

The nickname of the car comes from its particular shape, which resembles battle tanks of its era, (Note: i.e tanks of World War I.) as well as the location of the Grand Prix. Another Bugatti model that earned the nickname "Tank" for its design and aerodynamics was the 57G Tank from 1936.

== Overview ==
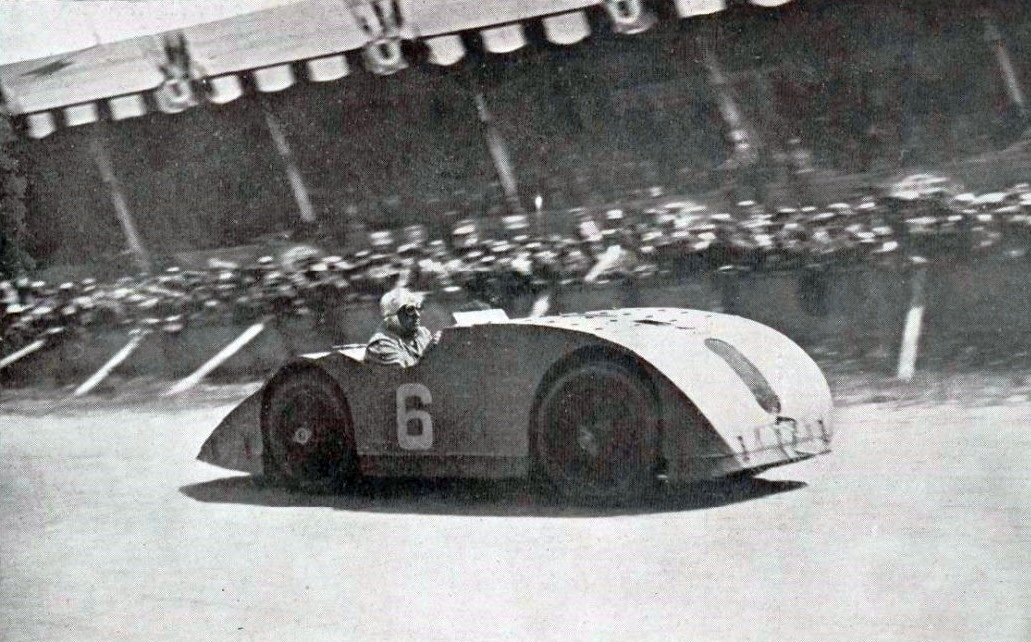
Ernest Friderich driving Bugatti "Tank" Type 32 at the 1923 A.C.F. GP (in Tours).

Designed especially for the 1923 French Grand Prix in Tours, this original car by Ettore Bugatti was designed to be simple and quickly assembled.

The first prototype with an aerodynamic aluminium body was built in six months around the 1,991cc in-line 8-cylinder engine used in prior Bugatti Type 30. The engine rated 90 hp for the competition and weighted for approximately 650 kg.

== Design ==
Compared to the previous competition model, the Type 29, (Note: AKA "The Cigar", nicknamed for its conical shape) the Type 32 only shared the motorization with the previous model.

The Type 32 was small in size, with a wheelbase of 1,994m, like the Bugatti Type 13. Five cars of Type 32 were produced. In addition to the prototype, four racing capable cars were made.

Each model came with the 2.0 L (1991 cc/121 in³) straight-8 engine based on that in the Type 30. It was a longitudinal engine with eight cylinders in line and five bearings with main bearings on the crankshaft. It had 3 valves per cylinder, two intake and one discharge, operated by a single camshaft. Brakes were hydraulically actuated at the front and mechanically actuated (metal cable) at the rear.

The Type 32 was the first Bugatti to be fitted with roller-bearing big ends in order to improve the bottom-end reliability. (Note: Bugatti was rather later than most manufacturers in the incorporation of a fully pressurised oil system, preferring a splash "spit and hope" delivery method.)

The Type 32 also broke new ground (for a racing Bug) by using a three-speed and reverse transaxle unit, the exceptionally short wheelbase and long straight-8 engine making a conventional gearbox difficult to accommodate. It also heralded a hydraulic front brake actuation.

Despite the low center of gravity, its grip on the road was poor. The reason for this was due to its aerodynamics being similar to that of a wing profile, which meant that the vehicle could tend to rise at high speeds. Also, its short wheelbase contributed to the problem.

=== Specifications ===
- Track: 41.4 in (1052 mm)
- Power: 90 hp (67 kW)

== Racing and legacy ==
4 race-capable cars were built for the 1923 French Grand Prix. The following Type 32 participated at the Tours race:

- No. 6, with Ernest Friderich, who finished third at the finish
- No. 18, driven by the Prince of Cystria, retired on lap 12
- No. 11, driven by Pierre de Vizcaya, retired at the start after an accident
- No. 16, driven by Pierre Marco, retired on the third lap3

During the race, the Type 32 reached the top speed of 180 km / h on the main straight. The French GP was Type 32's only GP race. However, for example the No. 6 (chassis No. 4059) was acquired by Mr. Junek from Czechoslovakia, who was racing with the car for the rest of 1923 and won for example the 3rd hill climb Schöberbergrennen.

Type 32 was replaced by the brand's most successful model in racing, the Bugatti Type 35.

Another tank-bodied Bugatti racer, the 1936 Type 57G, was much more successful.
