= 1922 Grand Prix season =

Grand Prix season

Seasons
- ← 1921 1923 →

The 1922 Grand Prix season had several notable events during the year. The AIACR governing body brought in a 2-litre formula for Grand Prix. French companies brought out straight-8 engines for their cars but it was FIAT's 6-cylinder engine that took the trophies. Veteran Felice Nazzaro won the French Grand Prix, held near Strasbourg. It was a tainted victory though, as Nazzaro's nephew was killed when his FIAT's suspension broke in the latter stages of the race. An almost identical accident also happened to team-mate Pietro Bordino, though he was only slightly injured. Pierre de Vizcaya's Bugatti finished second, nearly an hour behind.

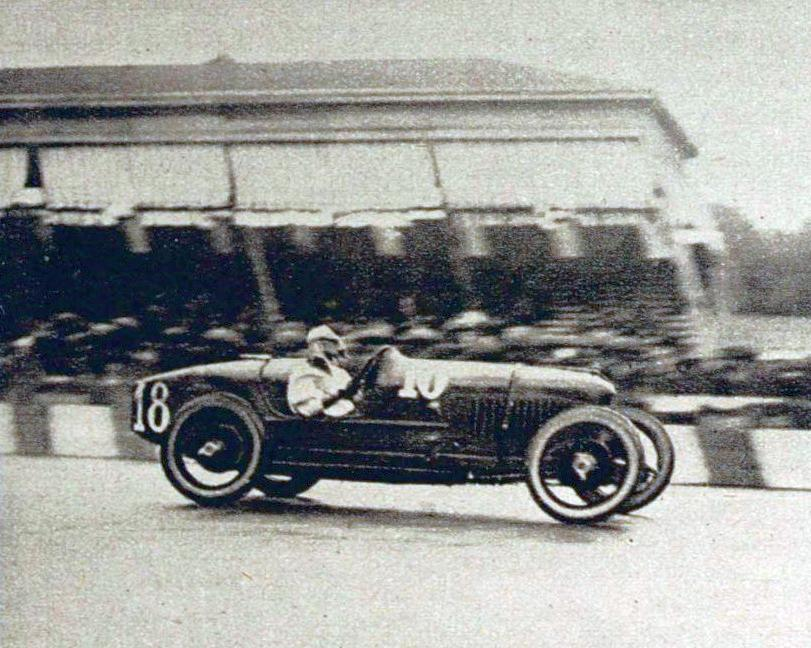
Pietro Bordino, winner of the Italian Grand Prix

The first Italian Grand Prix had been held in 1921 on public roads near Brescia. Following the example set elsewhere, land was leased in the Monza Park north-east of Milan to construct a closed circuit. The combined road course and racing oval was exactly 10 km in total length and built in just 101 days. After FIAT's dominance in France, most teams stayed away for the first Italian Grand Prix held at the Autodromo Nazionale Monza and only eight cars started. This time the junior driver beat the master, with Bordino leading home Nazzaro by two laps. De Vizcaya was the only other finisher, a further two laps back.

At the start of the season, Italian privateer Conte Giulio Masetti won the Targa Florio for a consecutive year, running a 1914 GP Mercedes. A number of manufacturers had sent works teams to this event, but Masetti's local knowledge and driving skill gave him a narrow victory over Jules Goux's Ballot.

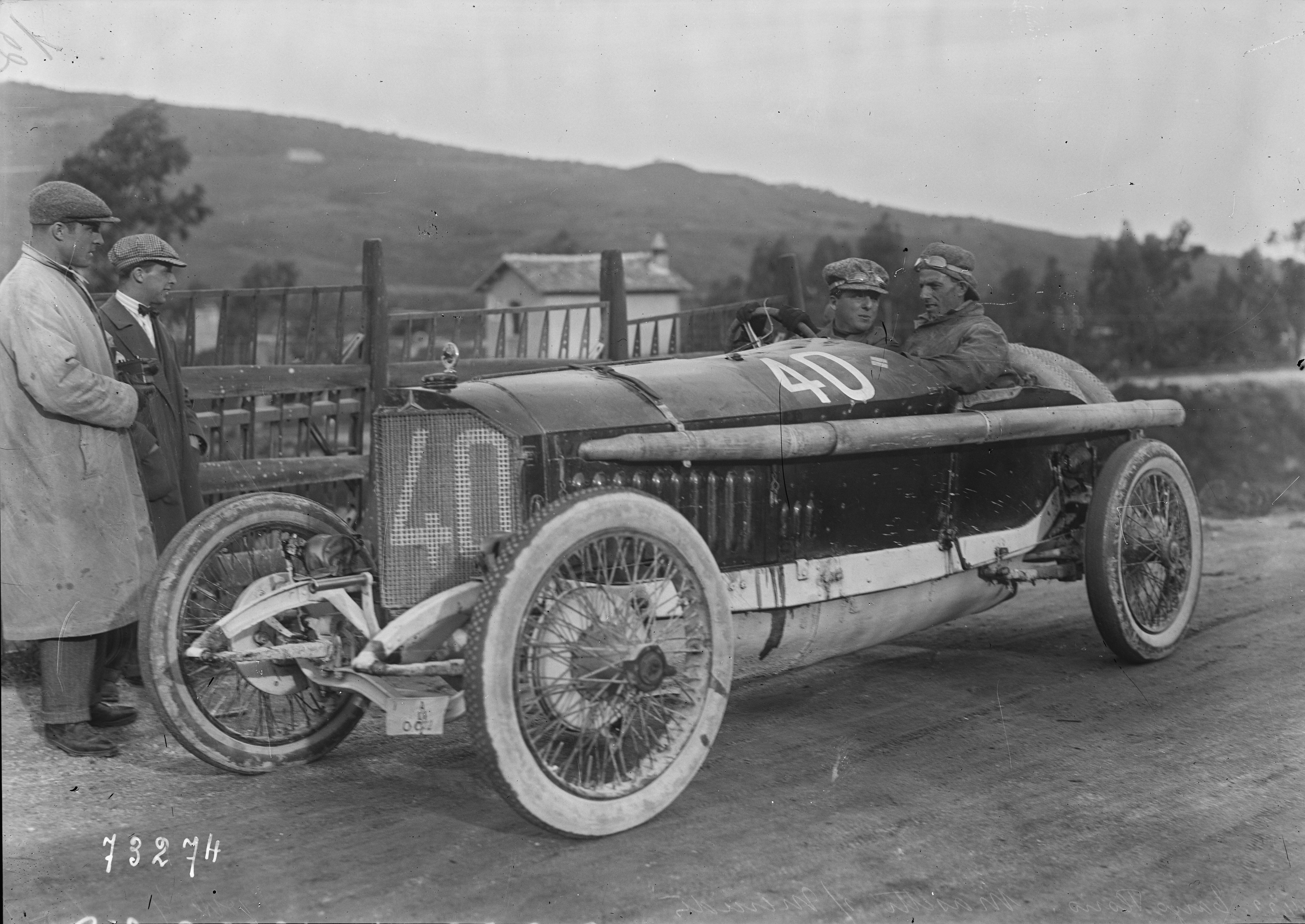
Giulio Masetti, winner of the Targa Florio, ready to start

Jimmy Murphy bought the Duesenberg he had won the French Grand Prix in the previous year and got it fitted with a Miller engine for the Indianapolis 500. There were also significant works teams from Duesenberg and Frontenac. Jules Goux also bought a pair of Ballots from France. Murphy set the fastest practice time and had a dominating drive to win by three minutes from Harry Hartz (Duesenberg) and Eddie Hearn (Ballot). He became the first driver to win the race from pole position. Duesenberg took eight of the top ten places.

== Major races ==
Date	Name	Circuit	Race Regulations	Race Distance	Winner's Time	Winning driver	Winning constructor	Report
2 Apr	(Italy) XIII Targa Florio	Medio Madonie	Targa Florio	430 km	6h 51m	(Italy) Conte Giulio Masetti	Mercedes GP 18/100	Report
30 May	(United States) X International 500 Mile Sweepstakes	Indianapolis	AAA	500 miles	5h 18m	(United States) Jimmy Murphy	Duesenberg-Miller Special	Report
30 May	(Italy) I Circuito Sardo	Cagliari, Sardinia	Formula Libre	500 km	6h 13m	(Italy) Ernesto Ceirano	Ceirano CS2H	Report
5 Jun	(France) II Grand Prix de MCF	Montargis	Cyclecar	325 km	3h 39m	(France) Luis Ramon Bueno	Salmson GP	Report
18 Jun	(Italy) III Circuito di Mugello	Mugello	Formula Libre	390 km	5h 46m	(Italy) Alfieri Maserati	Isotta Fraschini 5.9L Special	Report
22 Jun	(United Kingdom) VI Tourist Trophy	Isle of Man	Formula Libre	300 miles	5h 25m	(France) Jean Chassagne	Sunbeam TT	Report
22 Jun	(United Kingdom) I International 1500 Trophy	Isle of Man	Voiturette	225 miles	4h 15m	(United Kingdom) Algernon Lee Guinness	Talbot-Darracq 56	Report
16 Jul	(France) XVI French Grand Prix	Strasbourg	AIACR	800 km	6h 17m	(Italy) Felice Nazzaro	FIAT 804	Report
29 Jul	(France) II Grand Prix de Boulogne	Boulogne-sur-Mer	Voiturette; Cyclecar	450 km	4h 54m	(France) Lucien Desvaux	Salmson VAL	Report
27 Aug	(Italy) II Coppa Montenero	Montenero	Formula Libre	180 km	2h 53m	(Italy) Giulio Masetti	Bugatti Type 37	Report
3 Sep	(United Kingdom) I Junior Car Club Cyclecar 200	Brooklands	Cyclecar	200 miles	2h 30m	(France) Robert Benoist	Salmson VAL	Report
3 Sep	(United Kingdom) II Junior Car Club 200	Brooklands	Voiturette	200 miles	2h 18m	(United Kingdom) Kenelm Lee Guinness	Talbot-Darracq 56	Report
3 Sep	(Italy) II Gran Premio della Vetturette	Monza	Voiturette	600 km	4h 29m	(Italy) Pietro Bordino	FIAT 502SS	Report
10 Sep	(Italy) II Italian Grand Prix	Monza	AIACR	800 km	5h 43m	(Italy) Pietro Bordino	FIAT 804	Report
16 Sep	(France) IV Grand Prix de l’UMF	Le Mans	Cyclecar	400 km	4h 02m	(France) Robert Benoist	Salmson VAL	Report
18 Sep	(France) X Coupe des Voiturettes	Le Mans	Voiturette	440 km	3h 52m	(United Kingdom) Kenelm Lee Guinness	Talbot-Darracq 56	Report
15 Oct	(Italy) II Circuito del Garda	Salò	Formula Libre	250 km	3h 02m	(Italy) Guido Meregalli	Diatto Tipo 20	Report
22 Oct	(Italy) GP d’Autunno	Monza	Formula Libre	400 km	3h 03m	(France) André Dubonnet	Hispano-Suiza 9.4	Report
(21 May*); 29 Oct	(Spain) II Trofeo Armangué	Tarragona	Cyclecar	360 km	4h 18m	(France) Robert Benoist	Salmson VAL	Report
5 Nov	(Spain) II Gran Premi Penya Rhin	Villafranca	Voiturette	520 km	4h 56m	(United Kingdom) Kenelm Lee Guinness	Talbot-Darracq 56	Report
19 Nov	(Italy) VI Coppa Florio	Medio Madonie	Formula Libre	430 km	7h 09m	(France) André Boillot	Peugeot 174 S	Report

- Note *: = original race stopped and then rescheduled when a driver was in a fatal accident.

== Regulations and technical ==
New regulations set up by the AIACR (forerunner of the FIA) came into force this season for Grand Prix. The previous maximum engine limit of 3.0-litres was reduced down to 2.0-litres. The minimum weight was also correspondingly reduced from 800 to 650kg. The cars were 2-seaters and the weight of the driver and mechanic had to be at least 120kg.

It marked the end of the low-revving, long-stroke motors. The rules aimed to curb the increasing speeds and danger. Research moved into developing better engine alloys to save weight and to handle higher piston speeds. Then, starting with Mercedes, ingenious engineers found a way around these rules by introducing forced induction with the supercharger and speeds were soon at least as fast as they had been in the 3-litre formula.

The American Automobile Association (AAA) chose not to go to the new regulations, staying with the 3-litre limit. To take on the powerful Duesenbergs, innovative engineer Harry Miller built a new 183 cu in (3-litre) straight-8.

Once again the Targa Florio regulations were open to any-sized racing cars. Production cars (with at least 50 examples made), were now split into six classes based on engine-capacity. A maximum time-limit of 10 hours was stipulated, to qualify as a finisher.

Up to now the Automobile Club de France (ACF) had laid sole-claim to dictate the rules for Grand Prix racing. But at the end of the year at the annual general meeting of the AIACR, held in London, a new regulatory body was created – the Commission Sportive Internationale (CSI). Representatives were elected from seven of the major automobile authorities – of France, Italy, Great Britain, Belgium, Spain, Austria and the United States. Their role was to set up international racing regulations, categories and sporting rules. The first chairman of the CSI was Belgian René de Knyff, who went on to hold the position until 1946.

For the new regulations, three French manufacturers developed grand prix racers based on their touring or sports models. Ballot advanced its 2LS sports that Jules Goux had driven in the 1921 French Grand Prix. Bugatti used its 8-cylinder Type 29 (a racing adaptation of the Type 30). New entrants Rolland-Pilain had also developed a straight-8 engine and its A22 was unusual for the time in being left-hand drive.

Having developed an 8-cylinder engine for the short-lived 3-litre formula, FIAT was able to easily adapt it for the 1.5-litre voiturette class. With a simpler two valves per cylinder and putting out 60 bhp, this 1.5-litre straight-four became the benchmark for small-car engines for many years. In the sports-model touring car, the 501 SS, it became a favourite for the Italian amateur racer and the grand prix version was the Type 803. FIAT also introduced the first competitive racing 6-cylinder car: the 2-litre Type 804, using engine construction similar to the successful pre-war Mercedes racing cars utilising light alloys.

Manufacturer	Model	Engine	Power Output	Max. Speed (km/h)	Dry Weight (kg)
(France) Ballot	2LS	Ballot 1994cc S4	90 bhp	165	790
(France) Bugatti	Type 29	Bugatti 1991cc S8	90 bhp	185	750
(Italy) Fiat S.p.A.	804-404	FIAT 1991cc S6	112 bhp	175	660
(Italy) Alfa Romeo	RL	Alfa Romeo 2.0L S6	90 bhp		
(Italy) Diatto	20 S	Diatto 1997cc S4	75 bhp	155	700
(United Kingdom) Sunbeam	TT	Sunbeam 1975cc S4	88 bhp	160	680
(United States) Duesenberg	GP	Duesenberg 3.0L S8	115 bhp	185	1170
(United States) Miller	183	Miller 3.0L S8	125 bhp	185	990
(United States) Frontenac		Frontenac 3.0L S4	120 bhp	185	1030
(France) Talbot-Darracq	56	Talbot 1486cc S4	54 bhp	>150	
(Germany) Mercedes Benz	10/40/65	Mercedes 1.5L S4 supercharged	54 bhp 82 bhp s/ch		

== Season review ==
The first event of the season was the Targa Florio and the degree of interest it generated from manufacturers bode very well for the rest of the year. The liberal rules encouraged works teams from nine companies to put in entries and a huge grid of 42 cars arrived. Still regarded as the premier Italian event, Alfa Corse brought several models for their experienced team: Giuseppe Campari had a 6-litre 40/60; Ugo Sivocci, Antonio Ascari and Enzo Ferrari ran the pre-war 4.2-litre ES model, while Augusto Tarabusti was given the new RL prototype.

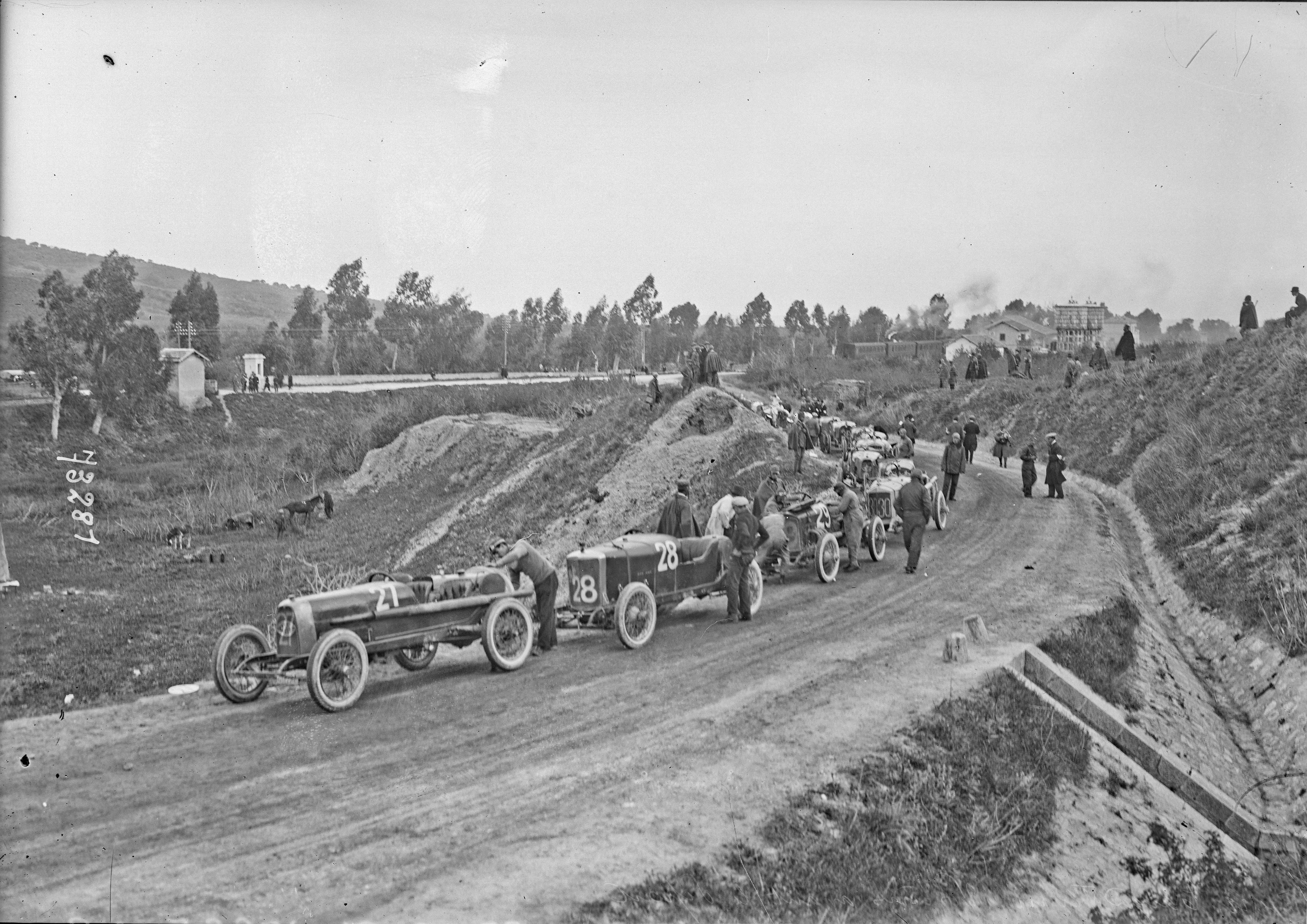
Targa Florio: Preparing to start

FIAT entered an 802 for Biagio Nazzaro, nephew of Felice Nazzaro. Diatto and Ceirano had cars in the under 2-litre classes. But it was the international entry-list that excited the spectators. After Max Sailer's venture the previous year, the Mercedes team turned up in force: Sailer and Christian Werner drove 7.3-litre 28-95 models; Christian Lautenschlager came out of retirement to run a modified version of the 1914 GP model, as did Otto Salzer. Two new 1.5-litre supercharged cars were driven by Ferdinando Minoia and Paul Scheef – this was the first instance of a supercharger was entered in a race. Wanderer Werke also sent a pair of voiturettes. From Austria came teams from Steyr with its 3-litre car, and Austro-Daimler. The new Austro-Daimler Sascha was designed by Ferdinand Porsche. Among the four drivers of the 1.1-litre voiturette included a young Alfred Neubauer.

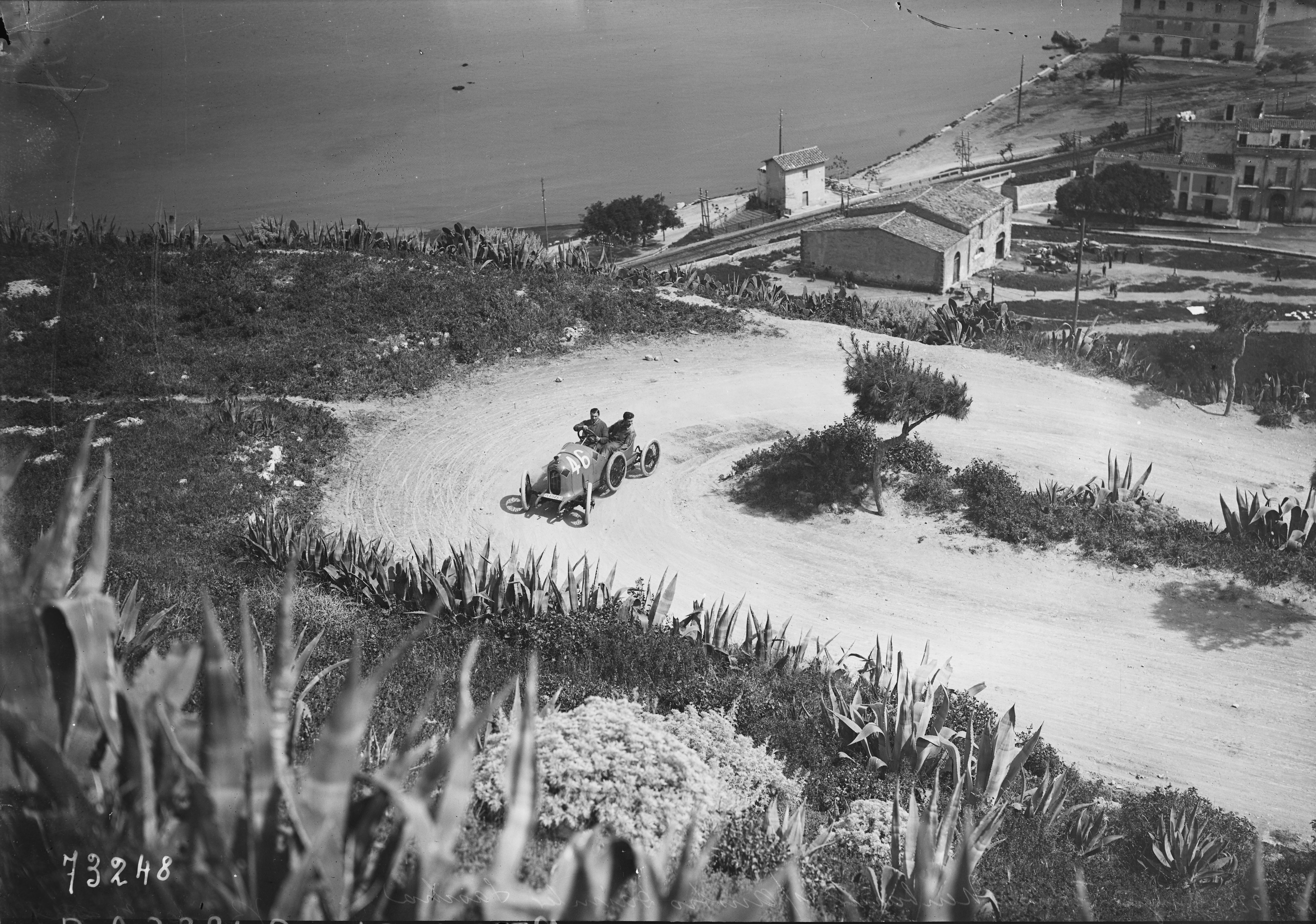
Targa Florio: Neubauer in his Austro-Daimler

The other significant entry was a pair of the new Ballot 2LS. These were prepared for the new 2-litre Grand Prix formula and the French team sent Jules Goux and Giulio Foresti to race them. The field was filled out with a number of privateers. Among them was the previous year's winner, Conte Giulio Masetti, who had swapped his FIAT for one of the Mercedes GP/14 cars.

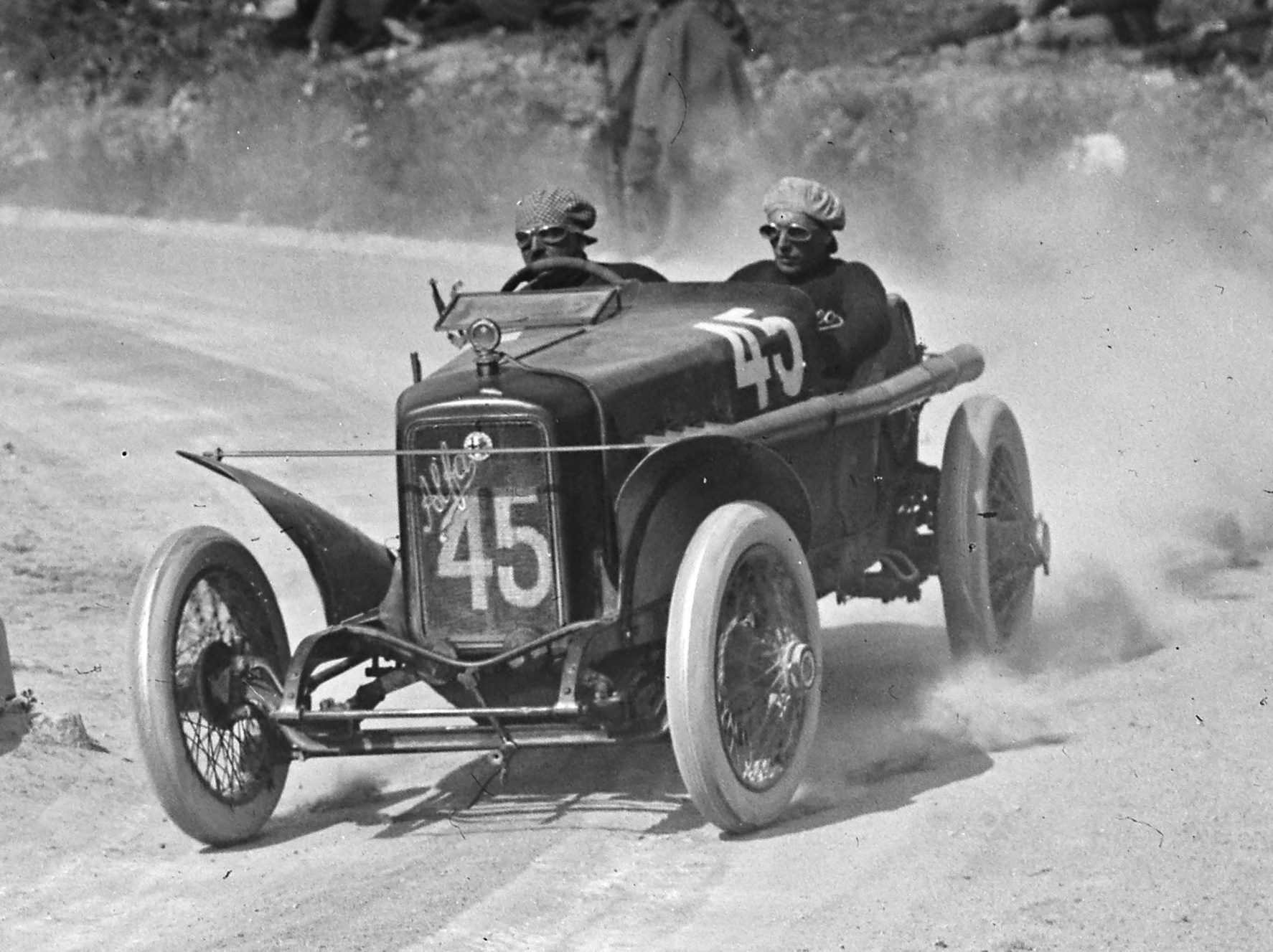
Targa Florio: Giuseppe Campari (Alfa Romeo 40/60)

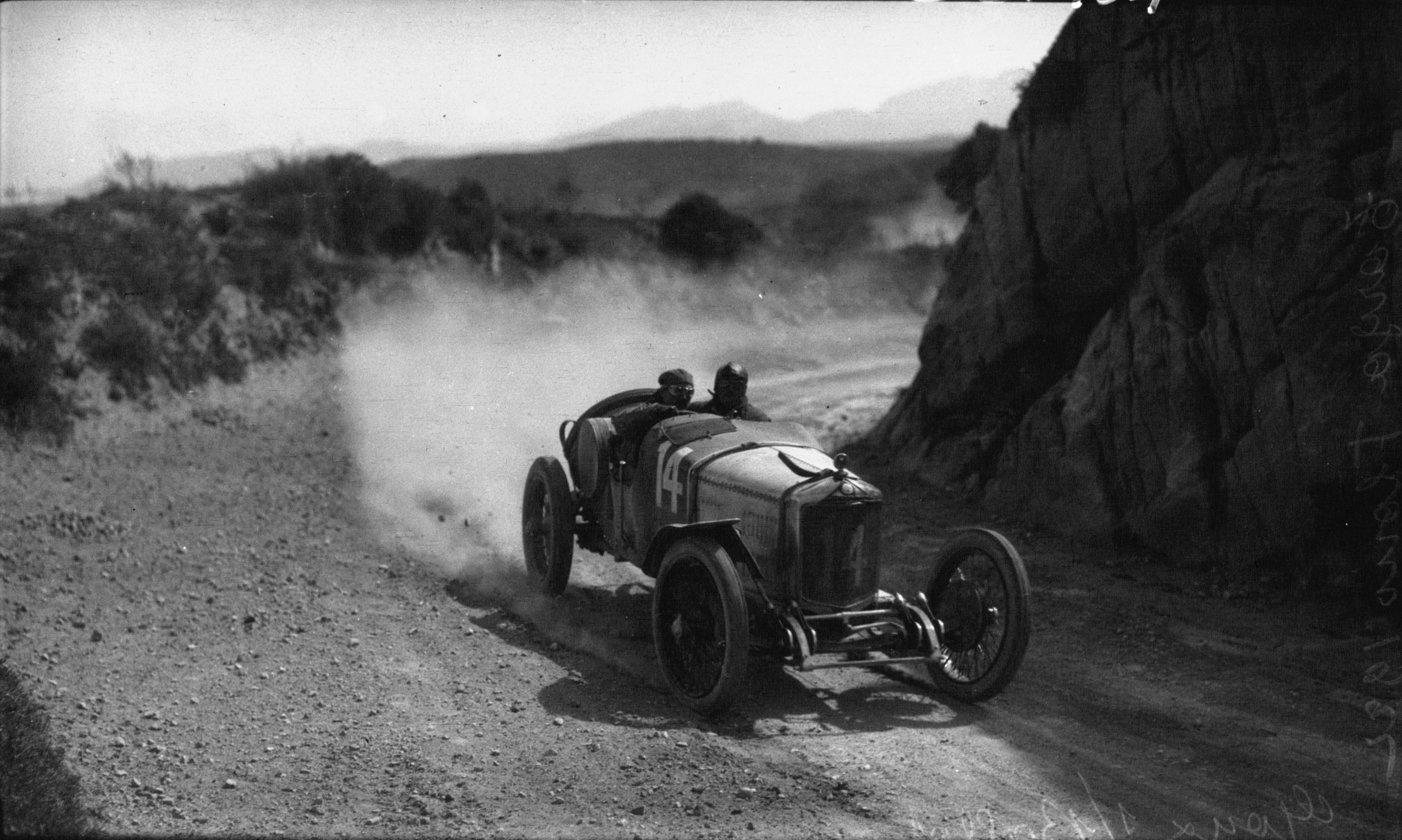
Targa Florio: Jules Goux (Ballot 2LS)

The biggest crowd since the inaugural event in 1907 turned out for the race, run over four laps of the 108km circuit. This ran from the coast near Palermo up into the Madonie mountains. Setting off at one-minute intervals, at the end of a blistering first lap it was Masetti in the lead based on elapsed time. He had set a new lap record and made up over four minutes on Sailer's Mercedes that had started six minutes earlier. Goux, who had started earlier, had also put in a strong opening lap and was pressing on. He took the lead at the end of the second lap when Masetti had to stop at the pits for five minutes to re-affix his bonnet that had flown up. Refuelled and with new tyres he took off after Goux. Going into the fourth and final lap he was two minutes behind. The Ballot's brakes and tyres were getting worn but Goux could not afford to stop. On the downhill run to the coast they finally gave out and put Goux into a ditch. Helped back onto the track by the bystanders, he raced on down the twisting roads then on the coastal straight from Campofelice to the finish at up to 200 km/h. The crowd was ecstatic when Masetti appeared soon after. A great lap gave him the win by just under two minutes after nearly 7 hours of racing. With consecutive victories, Masetti became a national hero. He was the embodiment of the gentleman-racer and named the “Lion of the Madonie”. Goux was second and his teammate Foresti finished third, while Ascari (Alfa), Enrico Giaccone (private FIAT) and Sailer (Mercedes) filled the next places.

After the 1921 French Grand Prix, Jimmy Murphy had bought the Duesenberg he had driven to victory and had it fitted with the new Miller engine for the Indianapolis 500. Cliff Durant and Frank Elliott were running Millers while the previous year's winner, Tommy Milton, ran a Miller engine in his own Milton Special. Jules Goux arrived with two Ballots for himself and Eddie Hearn. The only other European to arrive was Englishman Douglas Hawkes with a Bentley. Howdy Wilcox ran his old pre-war Peugeot. Louis Chevrolet had a strong seven-car team in his Frontenacs led by Roscoe Sarles and veteran Ralph Mulford. Matching them were eight Duesenbergs including perennial privateer Ralph DePalma as well as the six cars of the works team including new star Harry Hartz.

Eleven rookies and four former winners were in the field. Murphy put in the fastest lap in practise, setting a new lap record of 100.5 km/h to claim pole position. Beside him on the front row were Hartz and DePalma. Honorary starter this year was Eddie Rickenbacker. The war hero and former racing driver had competed four times in the Indianapolis 500 and returned from the Great War as the United States’ top-scoring fighter pilot.

Murphy was barely troubled as he romped to victory after leading for 153 of the 200 laps of the race. Hartz, his toughest competition, come in second three minutes back. Hearn's Ballot was third with DePalma fourth. Duesenbergs filled eight of the top ten places. For Chevrolet, it was a disastrous race with his only team car finishing in eleventh (an hour behind the winner) and a privateer in ninth.

Murphy became the first driver to win the race from pole position. With six victories and four seconds, he would comfortably win the 1922 AAA championship when it was retrospectively awarded in 1927. It would be the last time riding mechanics were carried in the race. It was also marked the end for Frontenac, as the formula changed for 1923, but marked the start of the sport's domination for Miller.

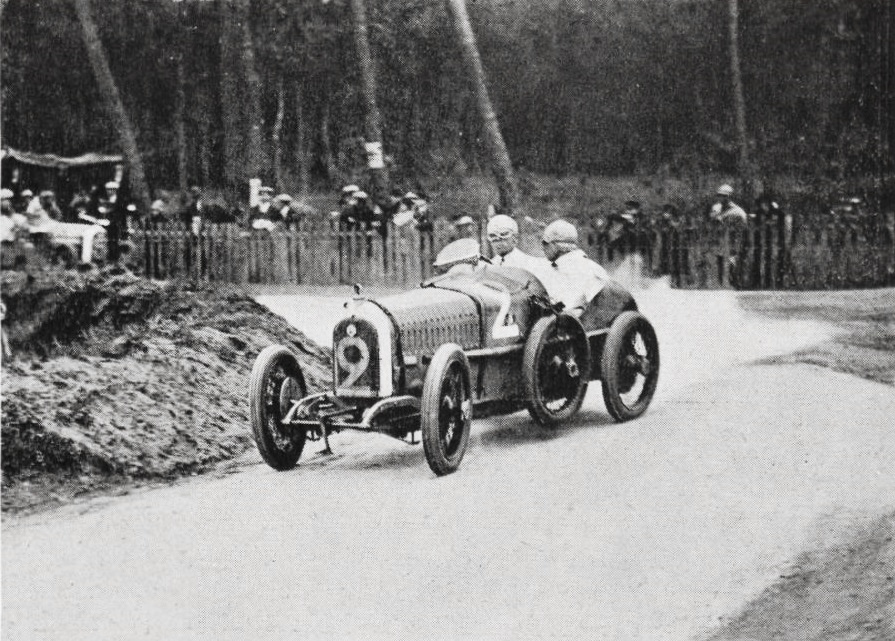
Kenelm Lee Guinness in his Talbot-Darracq 56 at the Coupe des Voiturettes

The sixth, and last, Tourist Trophy held on the Isle of Man for cars was run on June 22. It was won by Jean Chassagne in a 3-litre Sunbeam TT after teammate Segrave had to stop for a puncture and then retired with engine problems. Later in the afternoon, in terrible conditions, Algernon Lee-Guinness won the voiturette race in a Talbot-Darracq 56. This was the dominant car in non-Italian voiturette races (where the FIAT dominated). Algernon's younger brother, Kenelm Lee Guinness, won all three major events – in England (JCC 200), France (the Coupe des Voiturettes) and Spain (Gran Premio do Penya Rhin). Salmson dominated the smaller cyclecar formula through the year.

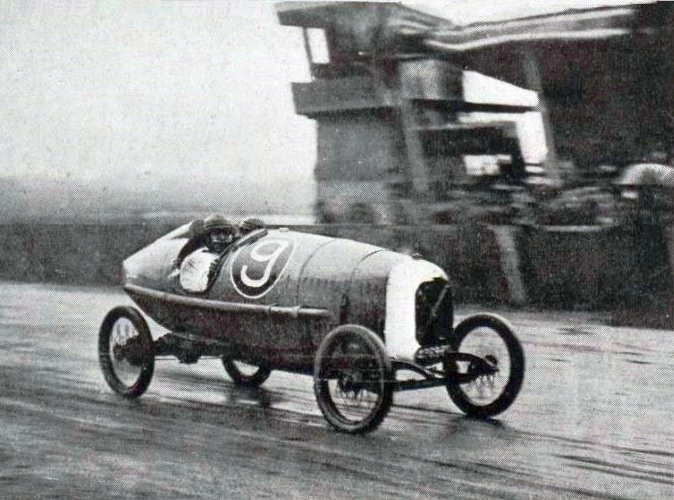
Robert Benoist winning the U.M.F. Cyclecar GP in his Salmson VAL

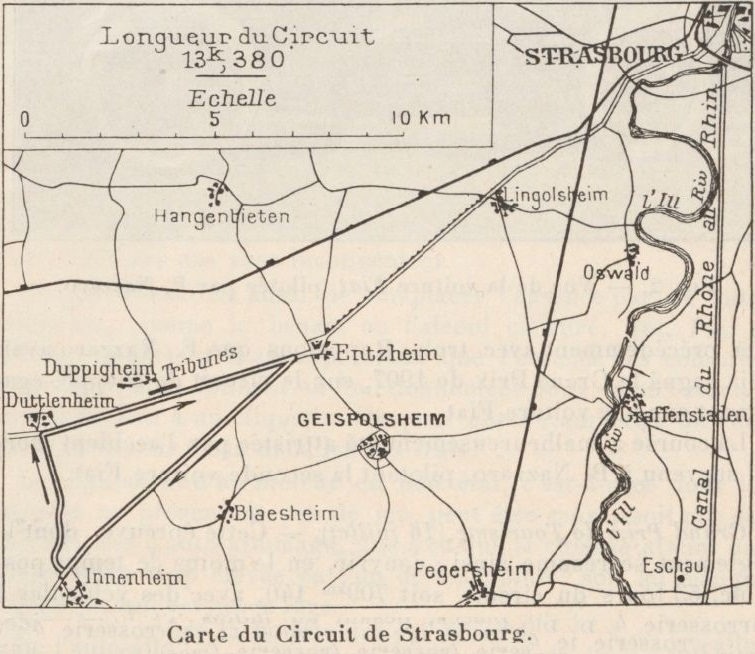
French GP circuit near Strasbourg

American cars were now ineligible for the French Grand Prix. This year the ACF held the race near the Alsatian city of Strasbourg and the home of Bugatti. The circuit was 13.4 km on a roughly triangular track with two very fast 5 km straights, emphasising raw speed over agility, and the race would be 60 laps. Three manufacturers entered to reclaim French honour: Ballot had their team-regulars Goux and Foresti, and invited Giulio Masetti (who had bested them in the Targa Florio) to join them. Bugatti had its new Type 30 for their drivers Ernest Friderich, Pierre de Vizcaya, Jacques Mones-Maurey and Pierre Marco. Both teams' cars bore a striking resemblance to the streamlined design of the American Frontenac cars.

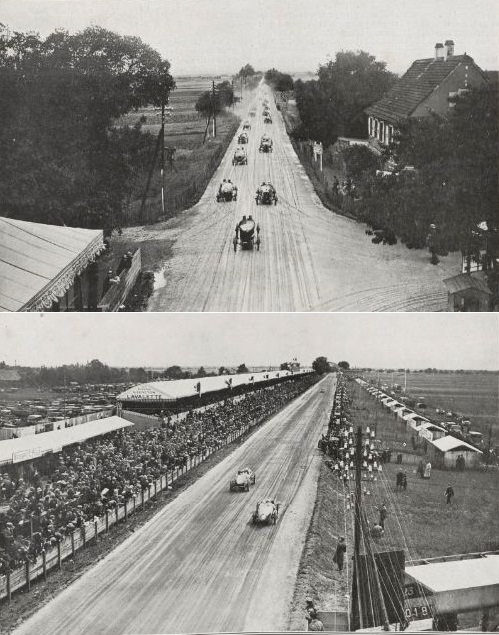
Views of the long main straight of the Strasbourg circuit

A team new to Grand prix racing, Rolland-Pilain had developed its own 2-litre straight-8 A22 and hired veteran drivers Louis Wagner, Victor Hémery and Albert Guyot. Yet again the German teams were not invited but a number of other foreign teams arrived. FIAT came from Italy with its new model, the 804. The team drivers were Felice Nazzaro, his nephew Biagio and the up-and-coming Pietro Bordino. Bordino had formerly been riding mechanic to Nazzaro, Vincenzo Lancia and Ralph DePalma. Great Britain was represented by Sunbeam with Henry Segrave, Kenelm Lee Guinness and Jean Chassagne. Count Louis Zborowski and Clive Gallop drove for the Aston Martin team, running a 1.5-litre car.

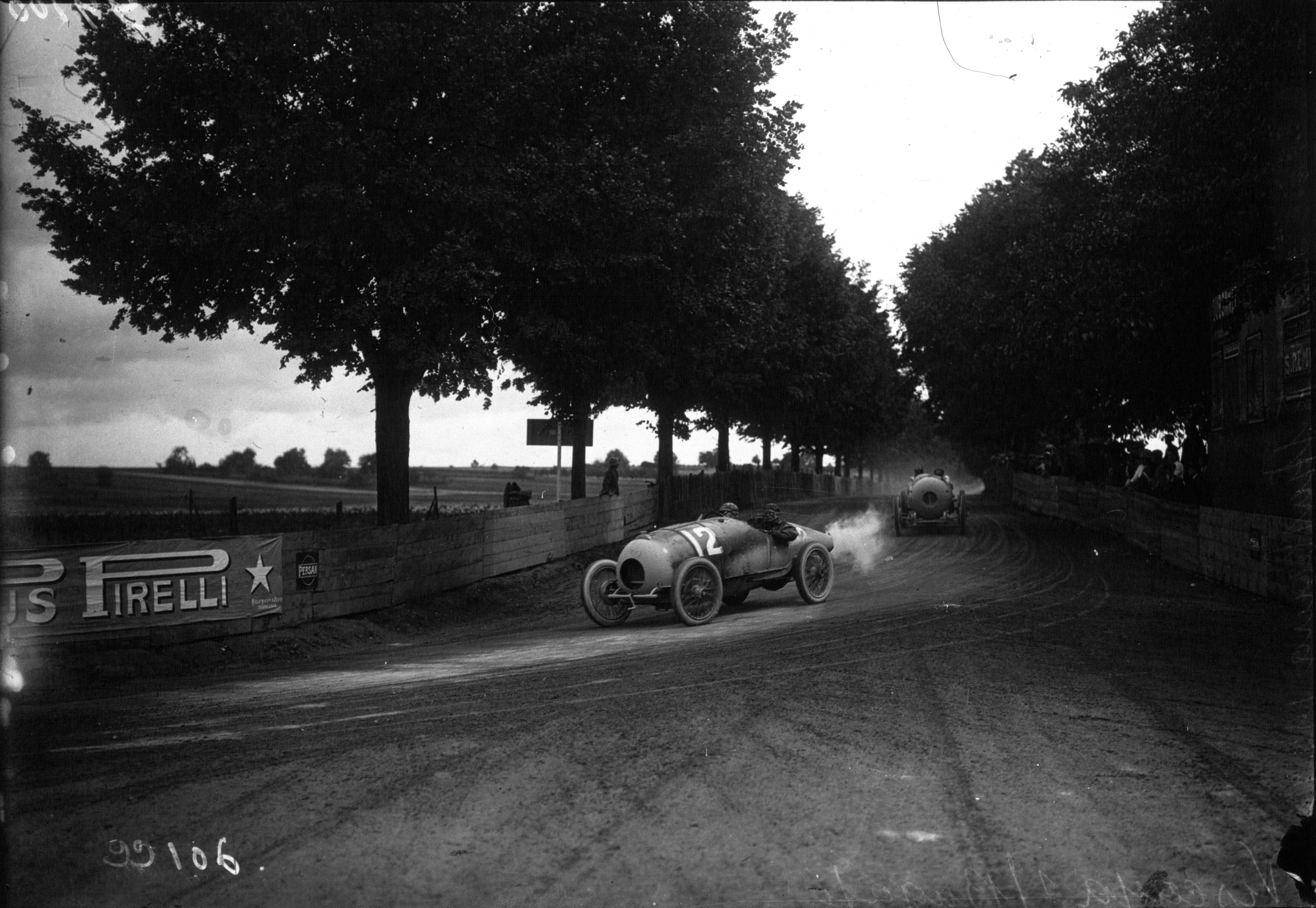
The Ballots of De Vizcaya and Foresti in the French Grand Prix

The FIATs proved fastest in practice. The ACF chose to forego the timed-interval start and adopted the rolling start of the American races. The starting order was still by random ballot although by coincidence Felice Nazzaro drew place #1. Race day had rain, making the track muddy. Nazzaro led the 18 cars in the mass-start and was first to reach the Entzheim hairpin, closely followed by the French cars of Friderich (Bugatti), Guyot (Rolland-Pilain) and Goux (Ballot). The FIATs soon showed their superiority and by the eighth lap were running 1-2-3. Other teams fell by the wayside and soon only Bugatti remained to challenge the red cars. Then as the race wound towards its end everything went terribly wrong for FIAT. On lap 51, Biagio Nazzaro's rear axle snapped at speed as he accelerated out of the Entzheim hairpin. The car somersaulted end-over-end, and the driver and his mechanic were both thrown out and killed. Then five laps later, the rear axle broke on Bordino's car. Fortunately, he was at a slower corner and the crew were injured but survived. The veteran Felice Nazzaro, unaware of the disaster, went on to win his last major race, finishing nearly an hour ahead of de Vizcaya's Bugatti. He was told of his nephew's death after he finished. The mechanics examined his car and found the axle cracked in exactly the same place as the other two FIATs.

Motor-racing was strong in Italy, but street races were difficult to organise and not profitable. The Milan Automobile club followed the example in Britain (Brooklands), the USA (Indianapolis) and Germany (AVUS)– to establish a closed circuit. They purchased a 30-year lease on a portion of the Monza Park, northeast of the city, which had just been bequeathed to the state by the king. An innovative design, combining a paved racing oval and a road circuit (exactly 10 km in total length), was laid out. The first sods of dirt were turned in a formal ceremony on February 26 by Italian racing heroes Felice Nazzaro and Vincenzo Lancia. Controversy started immediately and the Italian Minister of Education put a stop to work. The second Italian Grand Prix was scheduled for September, so after protracted negotiations when construction resumed in May, it had to be completed in exactly 100 days. In fact, it took 101 days and 200000 people came to see the inaugural race - the Gran Premio della Vetturette. A promising international entry list evaporated away in light of FIAT's superiority. In the end only five other cars arrived – three works cars from Chiribiri led by the owner's son Amadeo, and a pair of Austro-Daimler Saschas. The disappointing race, in heavy rain, was won by Bordino in a FIAT 502 with his new teammate Enrico Giaccone in second. Bordino set the first lap record for the track, at 4:08.2.

The second Italian Grand Prix was held at Monza a week later, also provocatively called the first European Grand Prix, that raised the ire of the ACF. FIAT arrived with three 804s for Nazzaro, Bordino and Giaccone. Once again, in what was to prove a common occurrence in the 1920s, the promised entry list of 39 cars was decimated by withdrawals. Teams from Mercedes, Ballot, Rolland-Pilain and Sunbeam failed to show. Bugatti also chose not to attend however Spaniard Pierre de Vizcaya drove his own car from the Molsheim factory to Milan. The only other arrivals were Austro-Daimler and two cars each from Diatto and German company Heim. But this was further reduced when Austro-Daimler driver Gregor “Fritz” Kuhn was killed in an accident during practice and the other two team-cars were withdrawn. De Vizcaya also soon found his tyres were not suited to the high-speed track, but a generous offer from FIAT to give him wheels and tyres (if only to give them some more competition) convinced him to race. Despite another wet race day another huge crowd turned out – including bringing 10000 of the 41000 cars registered in Italy at the time.

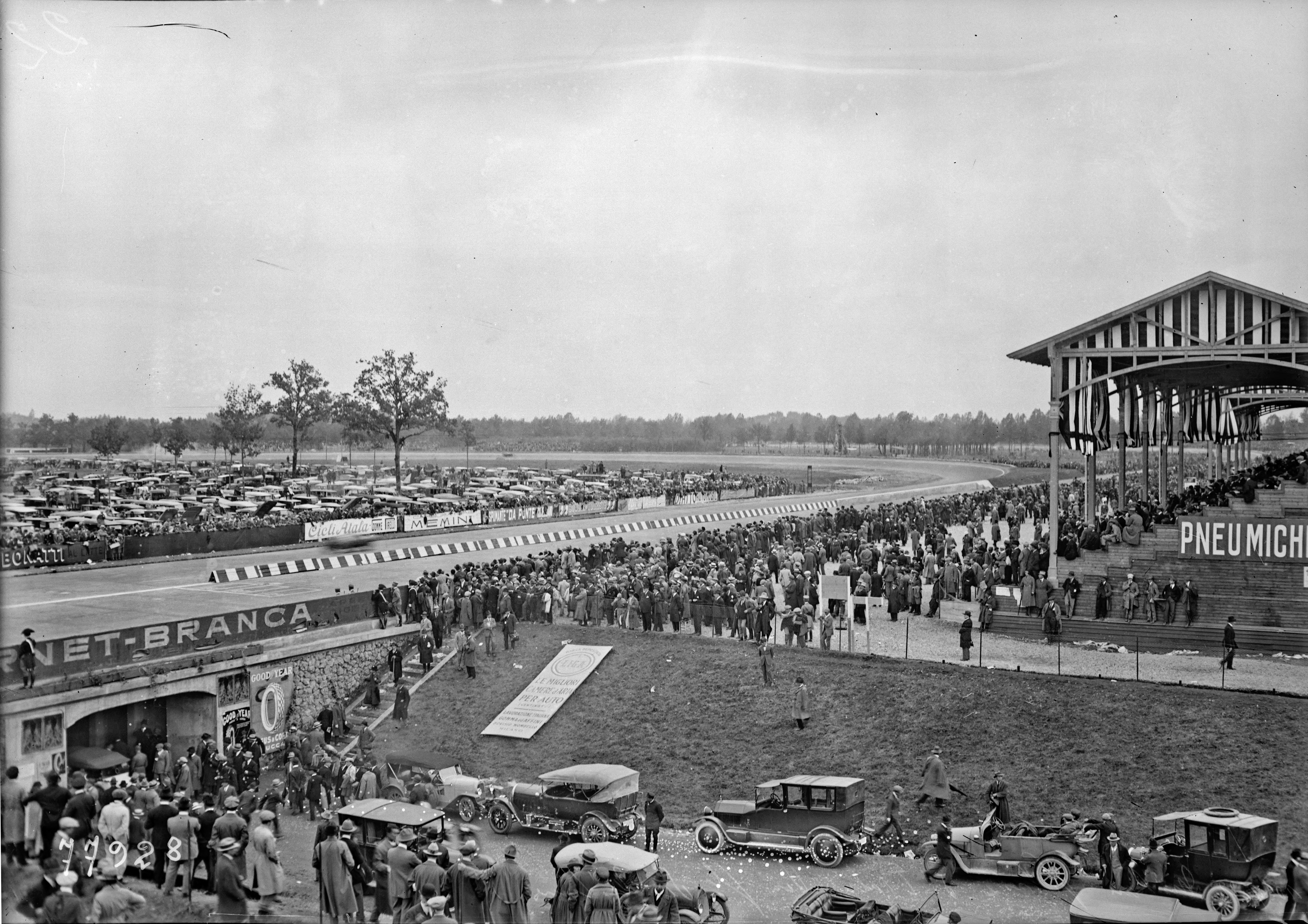
Final corner and main straight at Monza

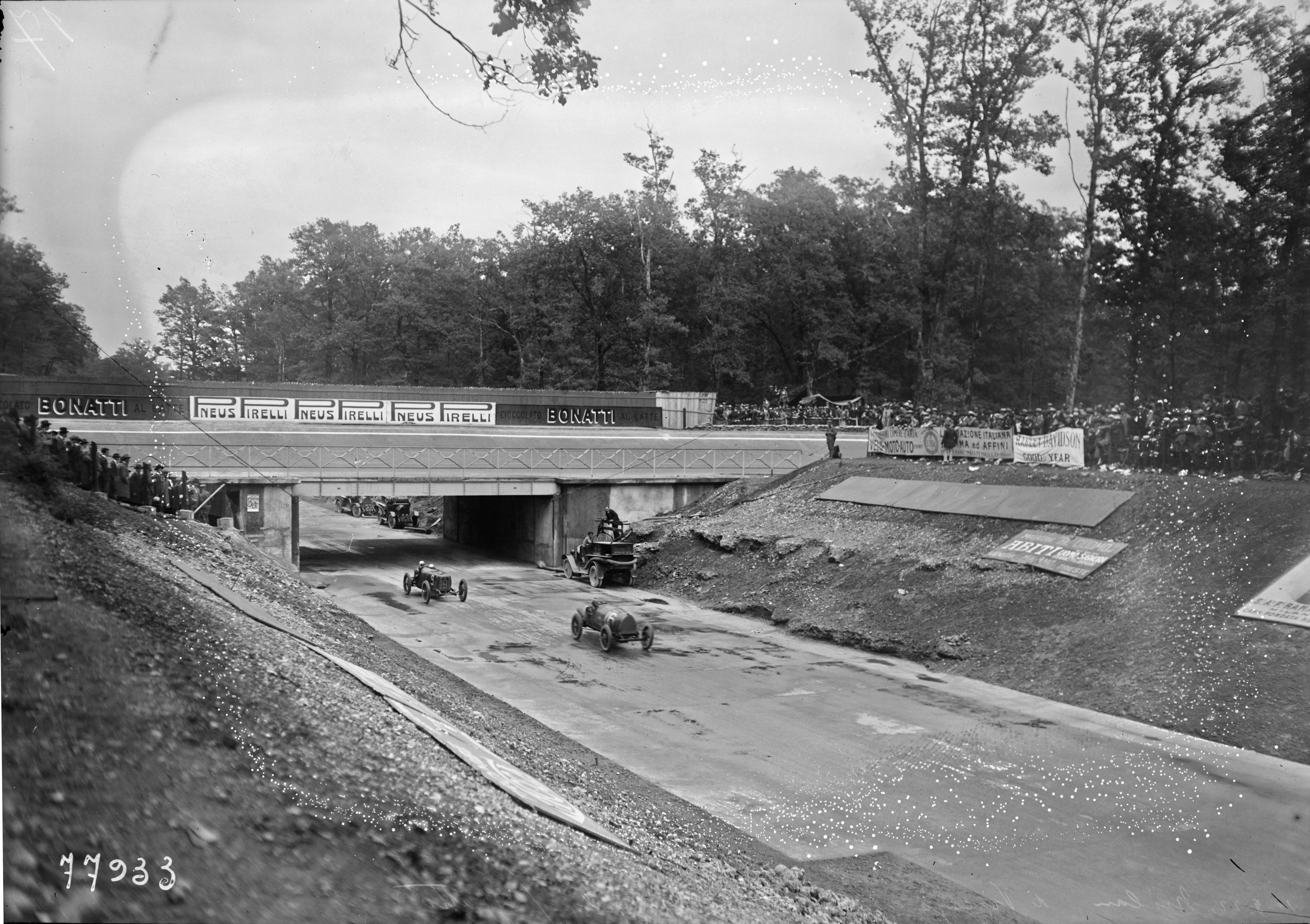
Bridge of the oval track across the back straight at Monza

At the start, Giaccone's FIAT was left on the line with a broken transmission. Meanwhile, the other two roared off into the lead. Both Heims retired early and on lap 27 Alfieri Maserati spun his Diatto at Lesmo from a twisted front axle. When Guido Meregalli retired the other Diatto there only remained three cars for the last third of the race. De Vizcaya was keeping up with Nazzaro until he lost a lap changing spark plugs. The only point of interest was the young Bordino lapping his more esteemed teammate twice on the way to victory.

The last major race of the season was the Coppa Florio – a repeat of the Targa Florio in that it was also run over four laps around the same Madonie circuit in Sicily. There were only nine starters, with Italian teams from Diatto and the new Officine Meccaniche (OM). Segrave and Chassagne came for Sunbeam, while Peugeot made a rare appearance with André Boillot and Maurice Béquet. Campari did not arrive in his Alfa Romeo. The race was started by the former King and Queen of Greece but tragedy struck on the first lap. Guido Meregalli crashed and rolled his Diatto. Henry Segrave stopped and pulled the injured driver from the wreck. His mechanic, Giuseppe Giacchino, however was dead. It occurred at the same corner where Gastone Brilli-Peri had also had a serious accident earlier in the Targa Florio. Boillot went on to win the race in his Peugeot over an hour from Segrave, just ahead of Béquet with no other finishers.

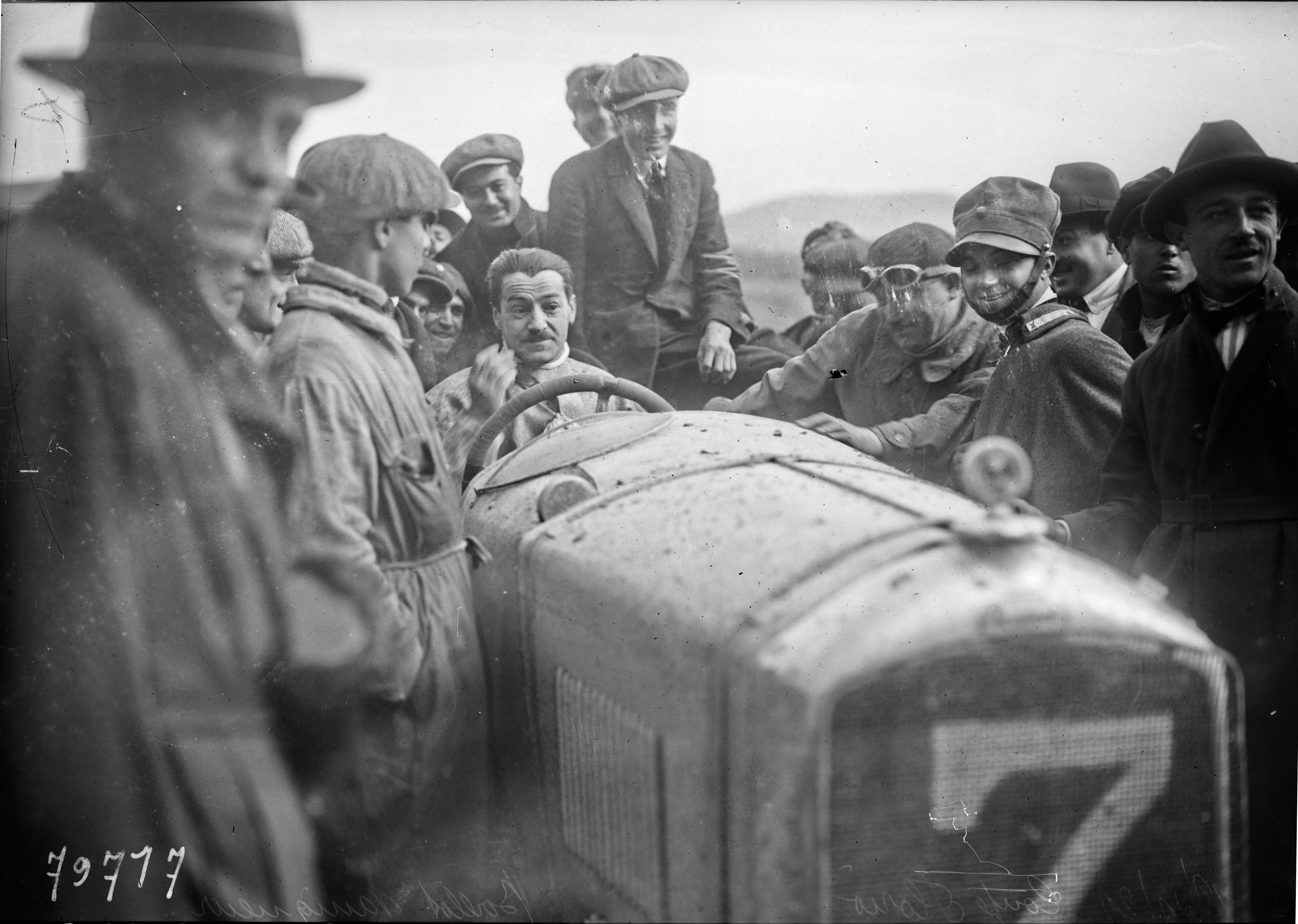
André Boillot winning the Coppa Florio

At the end of the year, with the Austro-Daimler company in financial difficulties, further development of the ADS II-R Sascha was cancelled. Ferdinand Porsche left the company and was picked up by Daimler as their lead designer. The role had opened up when Paul Daimler left his father's company to move on to be a designer for Horch. Porsche was followed soon after by the test driver Alfred Neubauer.

Citations
