= 1922 French Grand Prix =

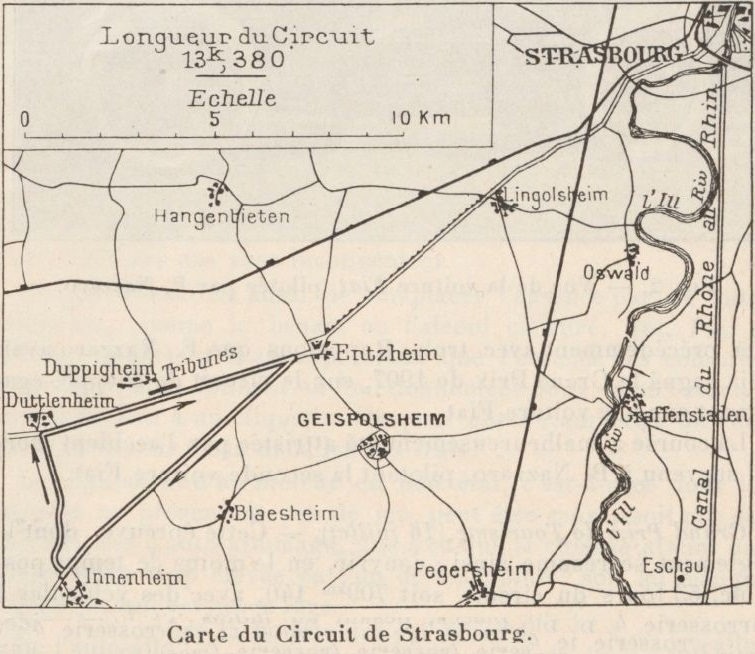

Race details
- Date: 15 July 1922
- Official name: XVI Grand Prix de l'Automobile Club de France
- Location: Strasbourg, France
- Course: Public roads
- Course length: 13.38 km (8.31 miles)
- Distance: 60 laps, 802.88 km (498.89 miles)

Pole position
Driver	(Italy) Felice Nazzaro	Fiat
- Grid positions set by ballot

Fastest lap
Driver	(Italy) Pietro Bordino	Fiat
- Time: 5:43.0

Podium
First	(Italy) Felice Nazzaro	Fiat
Second	(Spain) Pierre de Vizcaya	Bugatti
Third	(France) Pierre Marco	Bugatti

The 1922 French Grand Prix (formally the XVI Grand Prix de l'Automobile Club de France) was a Grand Prix motor race held at Strasbourg on 15 July 1922. The race was run over 60 laps of the 13.38km circuit for a total distance of just over 800km and was won by Felice Nazzaro driving a Fiat. This race is notable as the first Grand Prix to feature a massed start.

The race was run to new Grand Prix regulations, requiring engines no larger than two litres, in cars with two seats and weighing at least 650kg. In practice, the Fiats were dominant, with only the Bugatti drivers close in times (the Bugatti drivers had the advantage of the Bugatti factory being in nearby Molsheim, so had already learned the circuit). After the rolling start, Felice Nazzaro lead Friderich at the end of the first lap, with the other Fiat drivers down in the pack due to their lower starting positions. By lap 4, Bordino had taken the lead, and by lap 10 Biagio Nazzaro was up to third, so Fiat occupied the top three places.

The two lead Fiats would trade the lead several times due to pitstops, with Biagio Nazzaro holding third, the three Fiats continuing to increase their lead whilst many of their competitors retired, until after halfway, Biagio Nazzaro experienced difficulties, and made a slow pitstop, dropping him to fourth until Foresti, who had taken third, retired on lap 44. With nearly all other competitors retired (mostly with engine problems), and the race nearing its end, Biagio Nazzaro's Fiat lost a rear wheel at top speed, then hit a tree, turning the car over and killing him instantly. With just two laps to go, Bordino suffered a similar failure at a much slower part of the track, his car stopping safely with a lost rear wheel. Felice Nazzaro was left to finish the race, winning by nearly an hour. It was later found that on all three Fiats the rear axle casings were faulty, with a large crack developing on Felice Nazzaro's.

== Classification ==
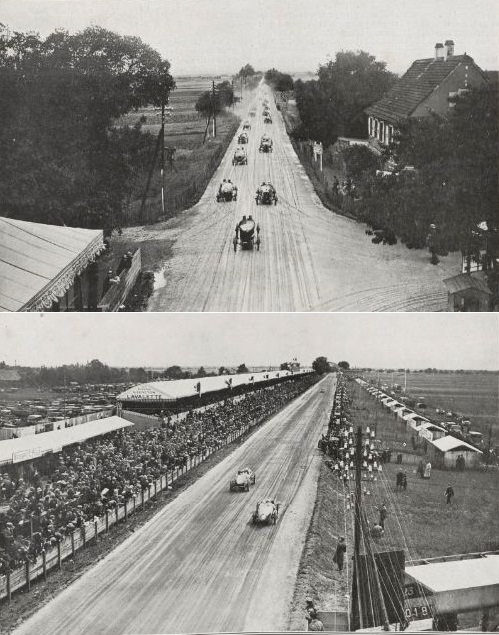
The race start and another shot from the start-finish area

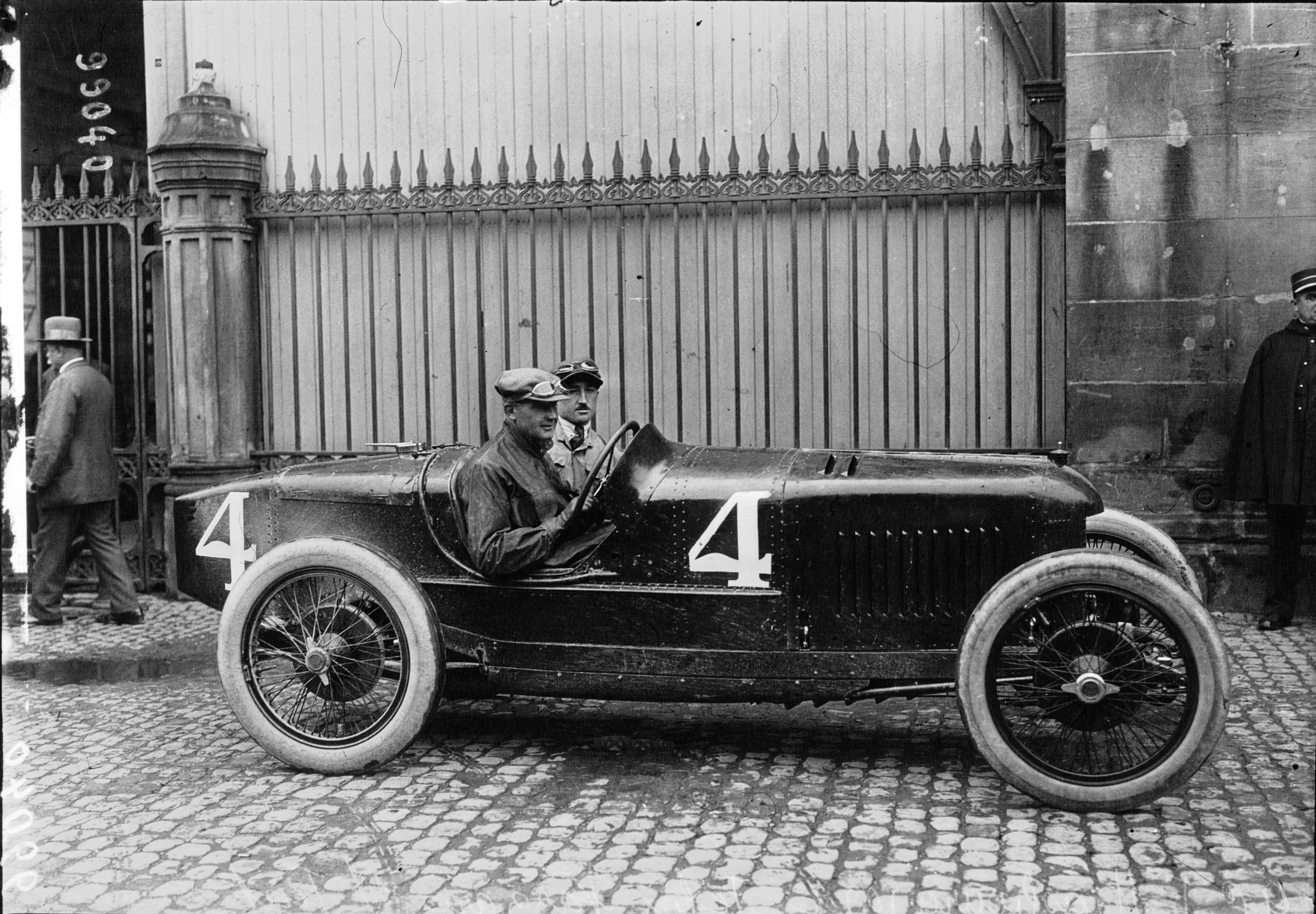
Winner Felice Nazzaro (Fiat 804)

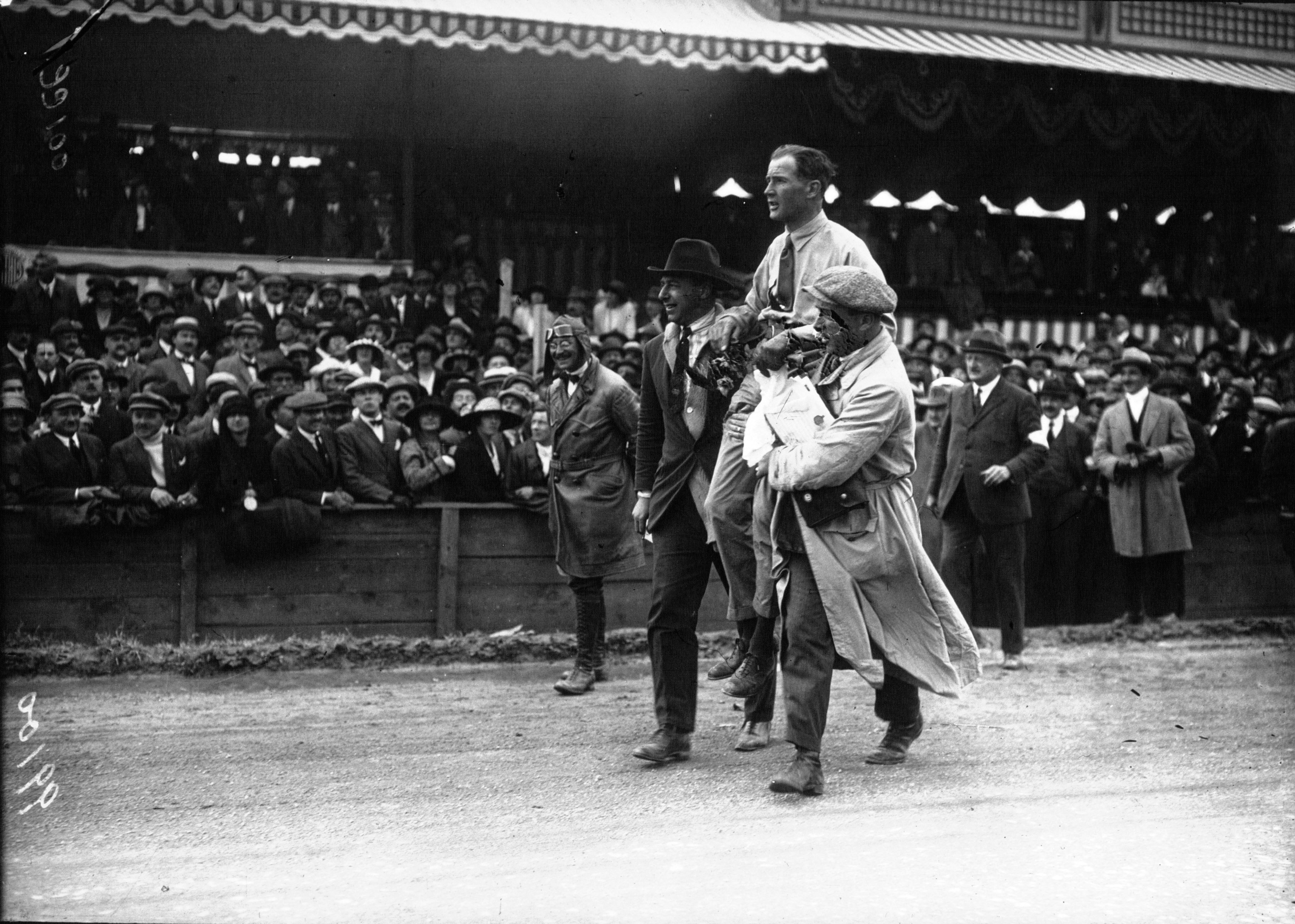
Felice Nazzaro after the race

Pos	No	Driver	Car	Laps	Time/Retired
1	4	(Italy) Felice Nazzaro	Fiat 804	60	6h17m17.0
2	12	(Spain) Pierre de Vizcaya	Bugatti T30	60	7h15m09.8
3	22	(France) Pierre Marco	Bugatti T30	60	7h48m04.2
4	11	(Italy) Pietro Bordino	Fiat 804	58	Rear axle, crash
5	18	(France) Jacques Mones-Maury	Bugatti T30	57	+ 3 laps
Ret	17	(Italy) Biagio Nazzaro	Fiat 804	51	Rear axle, fatal crash
Ret	14	(Italy) Giulio Foresti	Ballot 2LS	44	Engine
Ret	7	(France) Jules Goux	Ballot 2LS	31	Crash
Ret	8	(United Kingdom) Clive Gallop	Aston Martin GP	30	Engine
Ret	21	(United Kingdom) Henry Segrave	Sunbeam	29	Engine
Ret	15	(United Kingdom) Louis Zborowski	Aston Martin GP	19	Engine
Ret	20	(Italy) Giulio Masetti	Ballot 2LS	15	Engine
Ret	5	(France) Ernest Friderich	Bugatti T30	14	Engine
Ret	13	(France) Victor Hémery	Rolland Pilain A22	12	Overheating
Ret	16	(United Kingdom) Kenelm Lee Guinness	Sunbeam	5	Engine
Ret	9	(France) Jean Chassagne	Sunbeam	5	Engine
Ret	6	(France) Albert Guyot	Rolland Pilain A22	2	Engine
Ret	19	(France) Louis Wagner	Rolland Pilain A22	2	Engine

Grand Prix Race
Previous race: 1921 Italian Grand Prix	1922 Grand Prix season Grandes Épreuves	Next race: 1922 Italian Grand Prix
Previous race: 1921 French Grand Prix	French Grand Prix	Next race: 1923 French Grand Prix
