= Fiat 804 =

Italian racing car

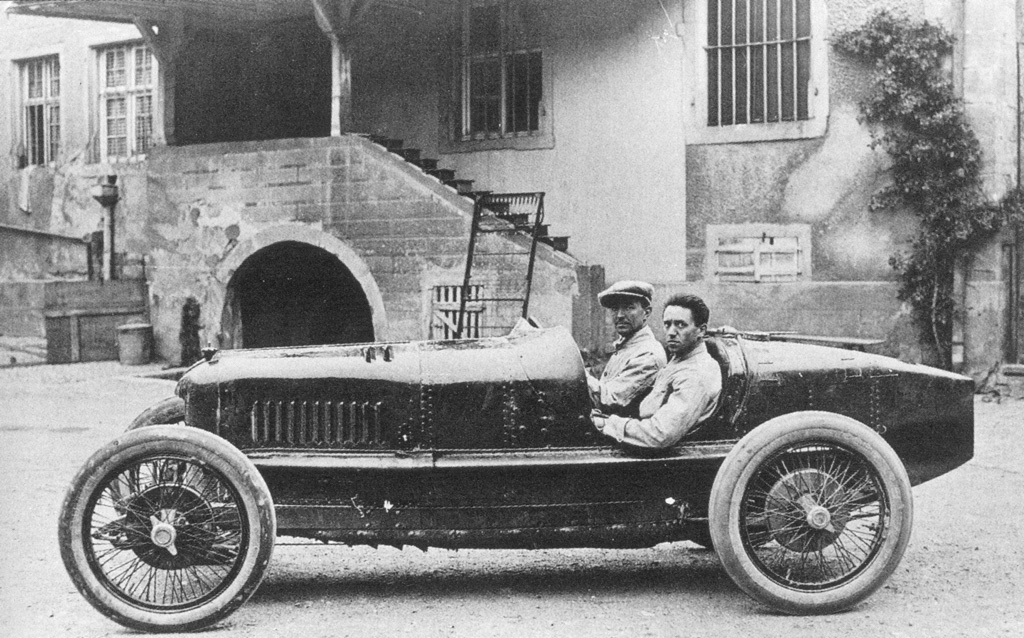
- Pietro Bordino on a Fiat 804 before the 1922 ACF GP.

Overview
- Manufacturer: Fiat
- Production: 1922
- Assembly: ITA

Body and chassis
- Class: Sports Type 404
- Layout: Longitudinal front

Powertrain
- Engine: Straight-six engine
- Transmission: 4-speed
- Hybrid drivetrain: 4-speed Mechanical
- Battery: 67 hp (49 kW) - 92 hp (68 kW)

Dimensions
- Curb weight: 660 kg

The Fiat 804 or 804 Corsa is an early 1920s racing car developed by Italian carmaker Fiat. Designed exclusively for competition, in 1922 it won both the Grand Prix of the Automobile Club of France and the Italian Grand Prix, establishing Fiat's dominance in Grand Prix racing ahead of such prestigious manufacturers as Ballot and Bugatti.

In 1922, the Grand Prix regulations set the maximum displacement of competing cars at 2 liters, so the new Type 404 straight-six engine with a displacement of 1,991 cm^{3} was chosen to power the Fiat 804; in reality, it was simply the engine of the 802, the Type 402, with two cylinders removed and a stroke reduced by 20mm. In contrast to the engine, the chassis - whose name "804" gives the car its name - introduces an innovative and "elegant" configuration.

After the departure of engineer Giulio Cesare Cappa from the management of the Special Studies Section, which had produced the Fiat 804, it was replaced in 1923 by the 805, which was given the task of preserving Fiat's competitiveness in Grand Prix racing.

== Context and development ==
=== Fiat at the Grand Prix ===
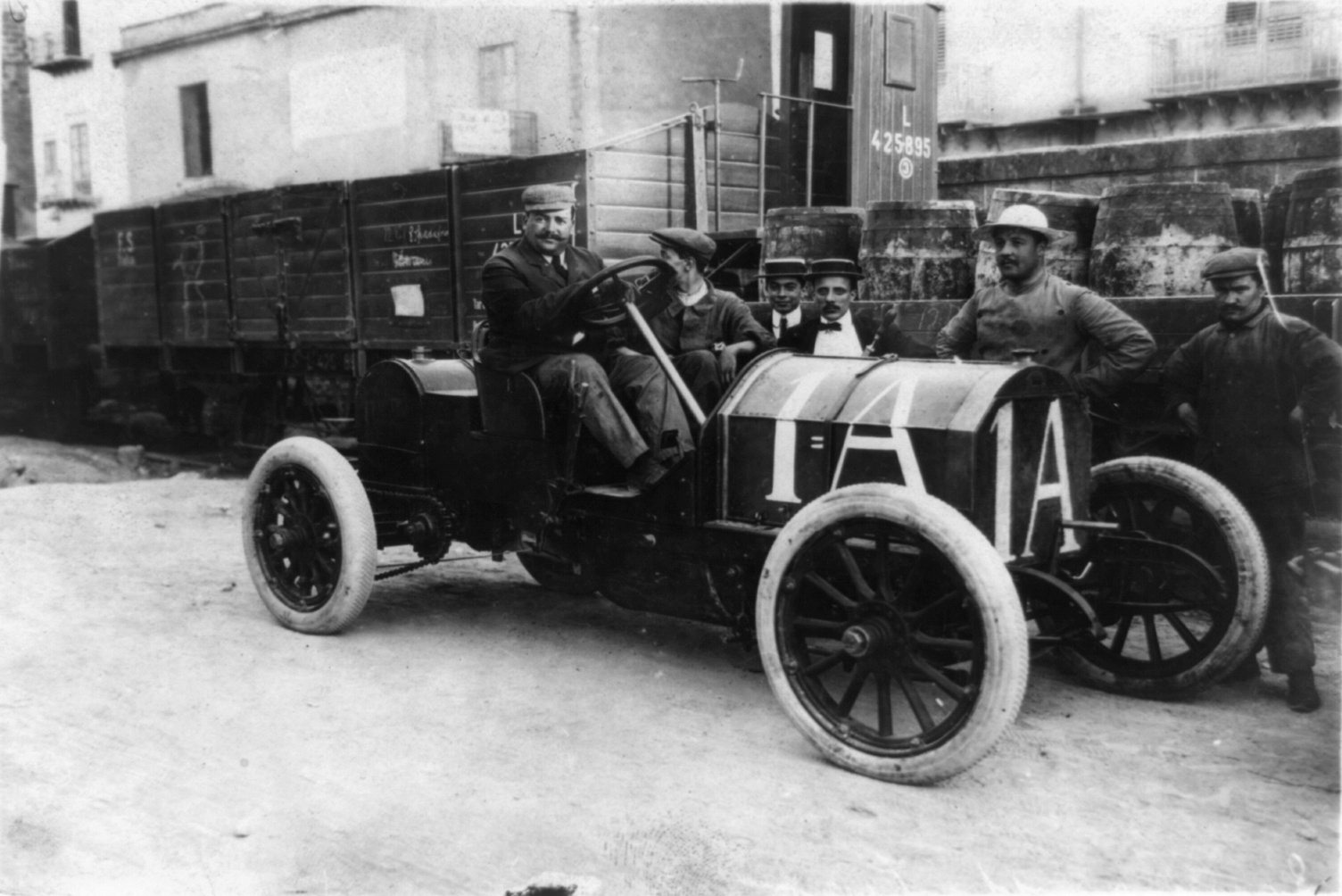
Vincenzo Lancia on a Fiat 50 HP in the Targa Florio, 1908.

For many carmakers in the early 1900s, competition was an extraordinary, if not obligatory, means of making a name for themselves and promoting their models, with a race victory quickly establishing a reputation. At the time, the meeting place for all sports cars was the Grand Prix of the Automobile Club of France, and Giovanni Agnelli, the founder of Fiat, didn't miss this opportunity to "prove the endurance and quality of his cars". To do this, he surrounded himself with two Italian drivers who are still famous today: Vincenzo Lancia and Felice Nazzaro.

Fiat entered two 130 HP cars in the first edition in 1906, and the one piloted by Nazzaro came second, albeit more than thirty minutes behind the winner. Nevertheless, Fiat finished ahead of Lorraine-Dietrich, Panhard, and Brasier, and with this result, the Italian manufacturer not only gained recognition but also assumed the role of a serious competitor. However, Fiat's real competitive heyday came in 1907, when Felice Nazzaro won the ACF GP, the Targa Florio, and the Kaiserpreis, the three most important races of the day.

=== Back to the competition ===
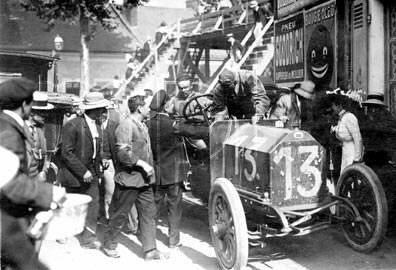
Victory for Victor Hémery on a Fiat S61 at the 1911 ACF GP.

The years that followed were years of transition for Fiat: the two drivers Lancia and Nazzaro left Fiat in early 1910 to set up their own company, the Automobile Club of France was unable to organize a Grand Prix in 1909 due to a lack of participants, and Italy, like many other countries, was preparing for a world conflict that would occupy it until 1918. Although Fiat did achieve some success - Victor Hémery won the 1911 Grand Prix of France on a Fiat touring car - it had to wait until the early 1920s, like other European manufacturers, for its official return to competition.

Surprisingly, it was at the Indianapolis 500 that Fiat made its return to competition, and it wasn't until 1921 that an entirely new car was designed specifically for the European Grands Prix, which had to comply with the regulations laid down by the International Association of Automobile Clubs. In 1922, it set a maximum cubic capacity of two liters and a minimum weight of 650kg for competing cars, to limit accidents: the Fiat 804.

== Technical ==
By 1922, the automobile was less than thirty years old, so it's not surprising that, from a technical point of view, the Fiat 804 was not fundamentally different from the first gasoline-powered automobiles, its mechanical part essentially boiling down to the engine. The latter, called "Type 404", was designed by Italian engineer Giulio Cesare Cappa based on the Type 402 engine, an inline-eight engine that had already proved its worth on other models.

Since Grand Prix regulations limit the displacement of engines entered in a competition to 2 liters, Cappa decided to remove two cylinders from the 402 engine. This modification was not enough to achieve the required displacement, so he also reduced the engine stroke from 120mm to 100mm, giving a stroke/bore ratio of 1.54 for a total displacement of 1,991 cc (121.5 cu in) and 65 mm × 100 mm (2.56 in × 3.94 in)^{3}. Cappa also borrowed the latest technologies from the Type 403 engine - finger follower articulation, three-valve return springs, and perforated pistons - and grafted them onto the 404 engine. In the end, it weighed 170kg.

Although the 804's engine, despite its new 404 name, had adopted no truly innovative architecture, Fiat had introduced a new gearbox, still with 4 gears but with a central lever, replacing those fitted to the Fiat 801, 802, and 501SS. The chassis, called 804, is of "classic construction", but its structure is unusual: the longitudinal members are arranged parallel to the front suspension springs (semi-elliptical leaf springs, as at the rear) before following the bodywork to the "Bordino" tip. Several aerodynamic details also set the 804 apart: the exhausts in particular, which are integrated into a profiled pipe riveted along the left side of the body.

Tested on the test bench on March 14, 1922, the 404 engine develops 67hp (49kW) at 3,000 rpm; however, thanks in part to its reduced stroke, which allows higher engine speeds, it reaches a maximum power of 92hp (68kW) at 5,000 rpm, just 200 rpm before maximum engine speed. As the car's total weight is limited to 660kg, just 10kg over the legal limit, the top speed is 170km/h.

== Sport results ==
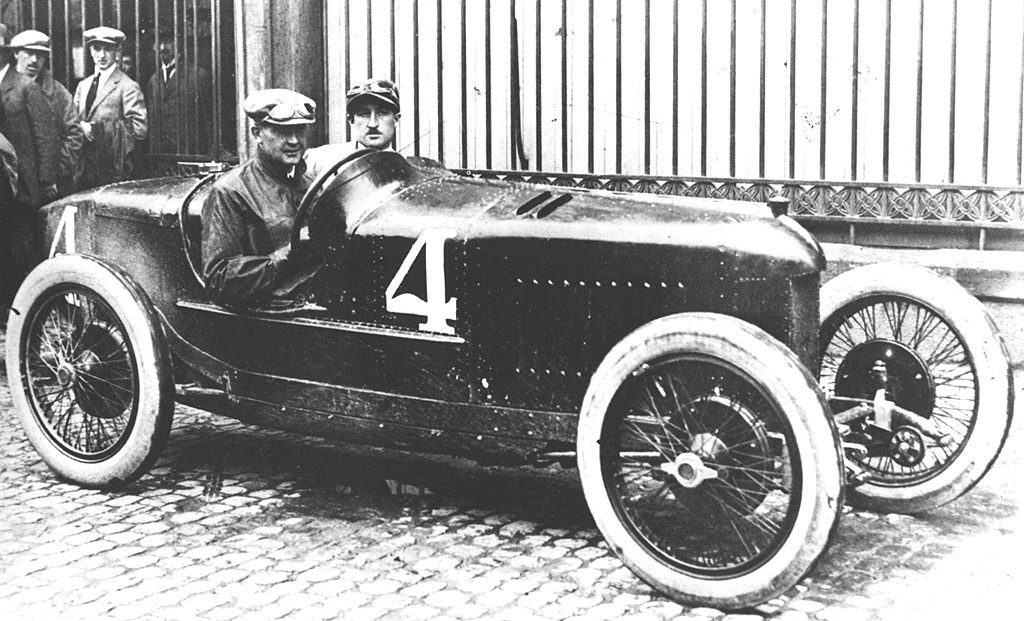
Felice Nazzaro at the wheel of his Fiat 804 in 1922.

In 1922, Fiat entered three 804 cars in the Grand Prix ACF, driven by Pietro Bordino, Biagio Nazzaro and his uncle Felice Nazzaro; the latter, who had already raced for Fiat in the 1900s, signed a new contract with the Italian manufacturer to compete in the 1922 ACF GP and the 1922 Italian Grand Prix. The French event, in which Fiat's two main competitors, Ballot and Sunbeam, took part, was held on July 15 in Strasbourg.

In the pouring rain, the cars started the ACF GP with a grouped start and Felice quickly took the lead, aided by lucky placement. A few laps later, marked in particular by the retirement of two Sunbeams due to a valve problem, he was joined by Bordino and Biago Nazzaro. The three Fiat drivers then led the race for almost forty laps - during which most of the competing cars fell victim to various technical problems - before Biago himself fell victim, on the fifty-third lap, to an accident that was to cost him his life: the rear axle of his 804 broke in a straight and lost a wheel, and the car hit a tree at full speed. On the final lap of the race, Bordino also suffered a similar failure, but managed to stop his car unhurt; he did not finish the race. Felice Nazzaro won the race with an hour's lead over his two Bugatti Type 30 rivals.

Despite Biago's death, Fiat once again fielded three 804 cars - with chassis reworked to avoid the incidents that occurred at the ACF GP - at the start of the Gran Premio d'Italia 1922 (Italian Grand Prix), held on September 10 on the brand-new Monza circuit. Felice Nazzaro and Pietro Bordino were once again present, accompanied by Enrico Giaccone in the third car. Engine power was increased to 112hp (82kW). Unexpectedly, Fiat's domination of the ACF Grand Prix led to a large number of no-shows for the Italian GP: Ballot, Benz, Bianchi, Bugatti, Mercedes, Rolland-Pillain and Sunbeam announced their withdrawal from the race. Austro-Daimler was also forced to withdraw following an accident during practice. In the end, only 7 cars, including 2 Fiat cars, took the start: Giaccone's Fiat 804 was unable to start due to a faulty clutch. After 80 laps, Pietro Bordino finished in the lead, followed by Felice Nazzaro. (Note: Pietro's Bordino victory on a Fiat 804 was in the "Car" category; Bordino had also won the "Car" category on a Fiat 803.)

The Fiat 804's racing record
Year	Race	Position	Pilots	Team	Model
1922	ACF Grand Prix	1st	(Italy) Felice Nazzaro	(Italy) Fiat	Fiat 804 92HP
1922	Italian Grand Prix	1st	(Italy) Pietro Bordino	(Italy) Fiat	Fiat 804 112HP
1922	Italian Grand Prix	2nd	(Italy) Felice Nazzaro	(Italy) Fiat	Fiat 804 112HP

== Impact ==
While the success of the Fiat 804 at the two main Grands Prix of the 1922 season helped to "restore Fiat's reputation", it also caused major upheaval in the Italian manufacturer's design offices. Giulio Cesare Cappa, who was always on the lookout for innovations, wanted to abandon the aging architecture of the 404 engine (derived from the 402 and 403 engines) for a new one. This idea displeased Guido Fornaca, one of Fiat's top executives, who on the contrary considered it preferable to improve existing, tried-and-tested technologies, to guarantee Fiat's further success in competition, vital for touring car sales.

Feeling his hands were tied, Cappa decided to leave his post at the head of the Special Studies Section and devote himself exclusively to touring cars, hoping to combine elegant design with high technical standards; the Fiat 519 and 509 were born of this desire. But once again, this vision clashed with that of Fiat, whose aim was to produce mass-produced models with limited technical requirements. Frustrated, Cappa left Fiat for good on February 6, 1924. For his part, Vincenzo Bertarione, supervisor of the 402/403/404 engines, had left Fiat at the end of 1922 after refusing to accept a pay rise requested following Grand Prix victories.

== See also ==
- Fiat 591
- 1922 French Grand Prix
- 1922 Italian Grand Prix
- Felice Nazzaro
- Vincenzo Lancia
- Pietro Bordino

== Bibliography ==
- Faurès Fustel de Coulanges, Sébastien (2009). Fiat en Grand Prix (in French) (1st ed.). France: ETAI. p. 191. ISBN 978-2-7268-8885-8.
