= Fiat 519 =

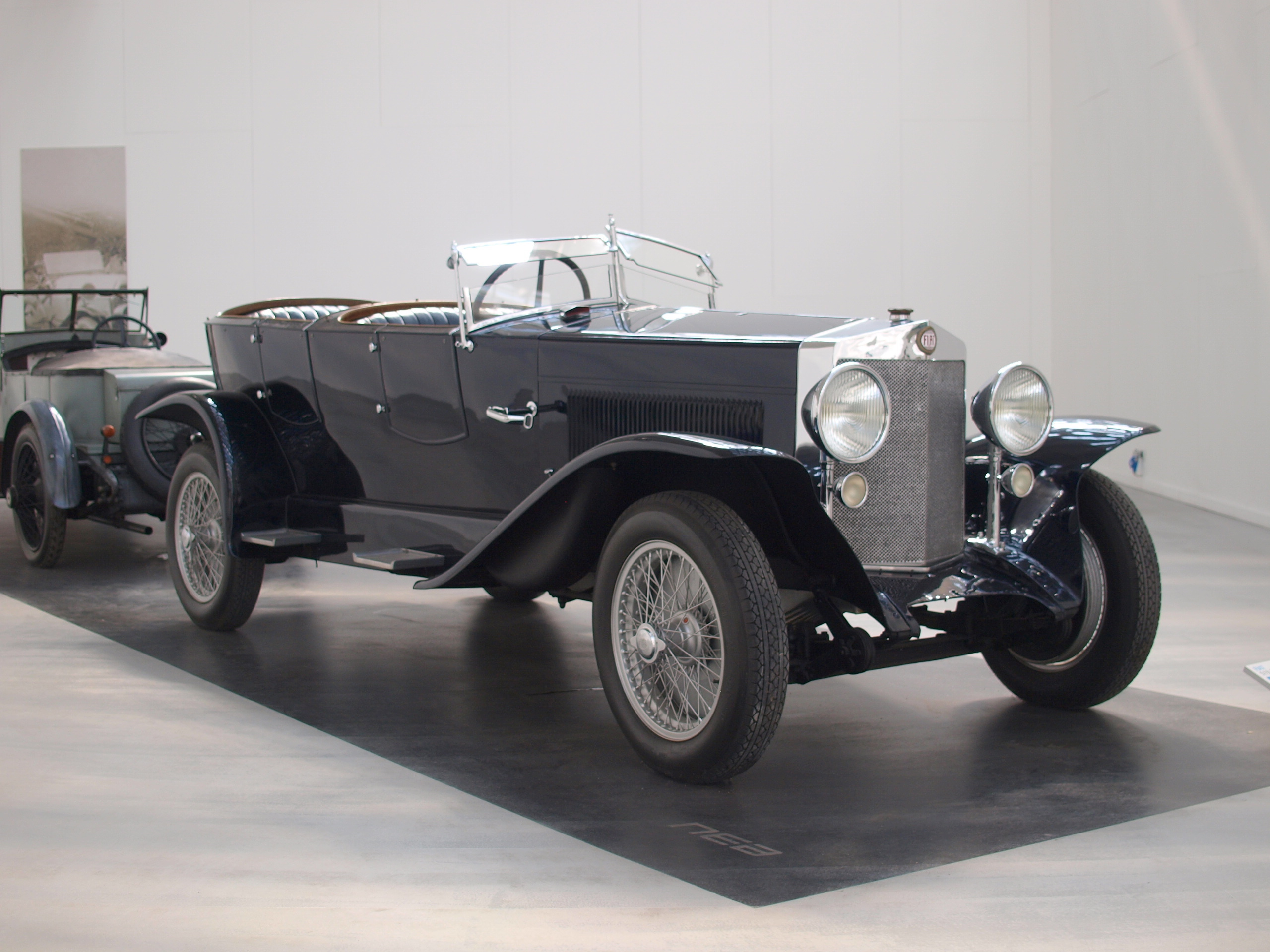
- Fiat 519 S Torpedo

Overview
- Manufacturer: Fiat
- Production: 1922–1927

Body and chassis
- Class: Luxury car
- Body style: 4-door sedan 4-door limousine 4-door cabriolet
- Layout: FR layout

Powertrain
- Engine: straight-6, 4766 cc,
- Transmission: 4-speed manual

Dimensions
- Wheelbase: 360 cm (141.7 in); 300 cm (118.1 in) (519 S)
- Curb weight: 2,000 kg (4,400 lb)

Chronology
- Predecessor: Fiat 520 Superfiat
- Successor: Fiat 525

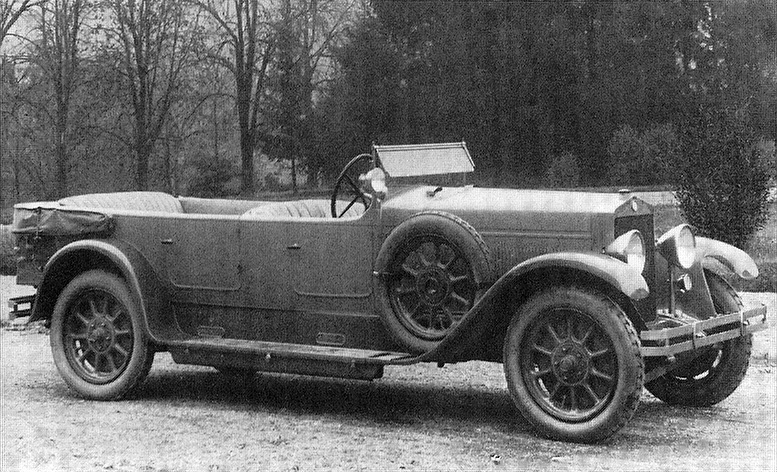
Fiat 519 B Torpedo 1925

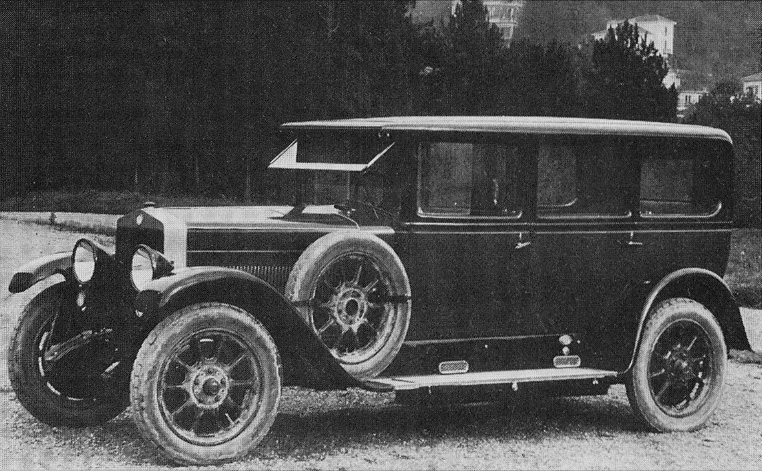
Fiat 519 A Sedan 1924

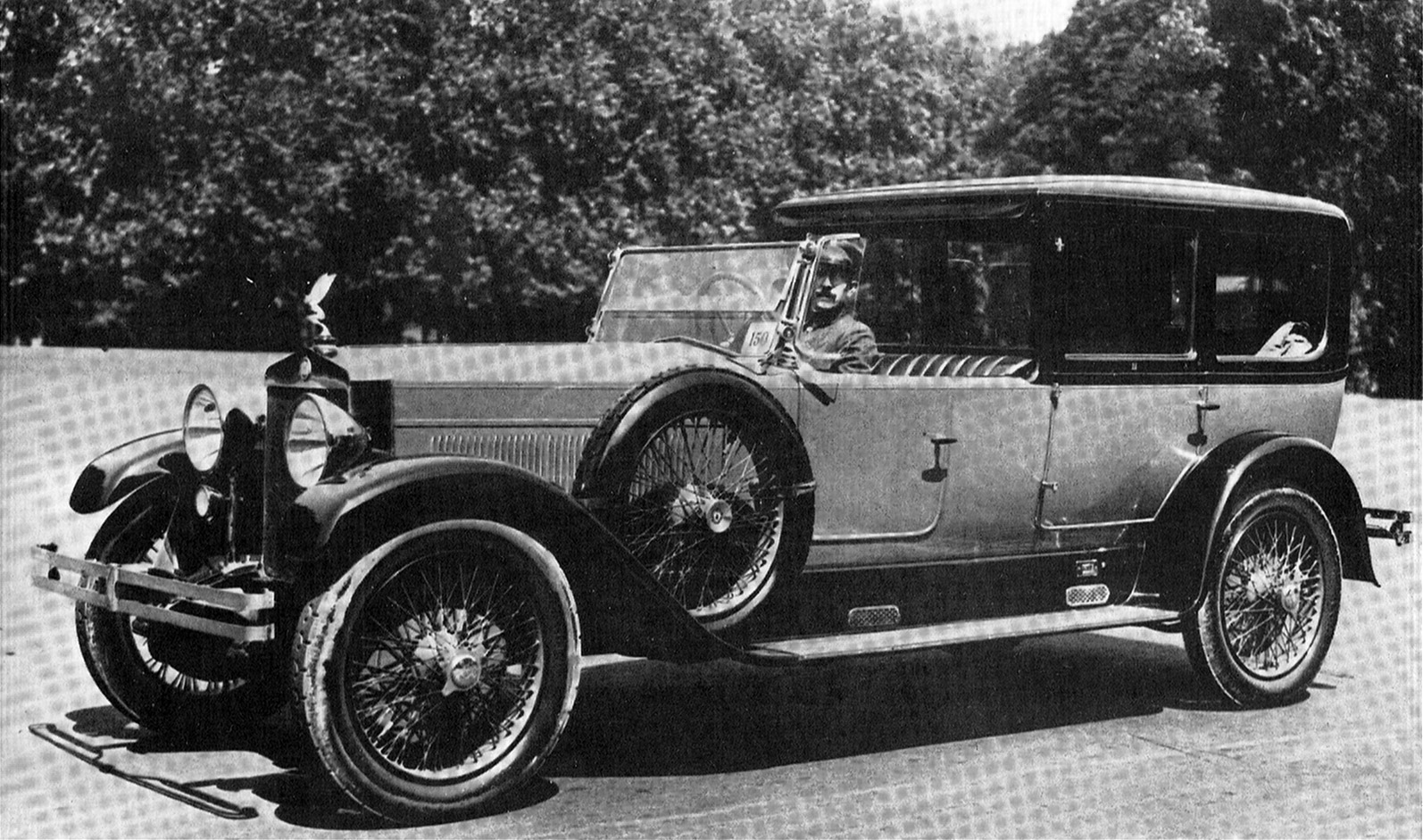
Fiat 519 Series1 Sedanca-de-Ville 1922

The Fiat 519 was a model of car produced by Italian automotive company, Fiat between 1922 and 1927.

2,411 were produced in total. Approximately 25 are known worldwide, of which one is a genuine 519S and three others are shortened 519s. Three have the pointed 519S radiator and the other two are flat.

There are nearly 1,600 nickel plated parts on a Fiat 519 chassis.

== Types ==
- 519, 519A, 519B,519C &519S 4/5S Tourer 4 doors, 2+2 seats
  - 519A had taller radiator and detail changes to engine.-Larger water pump, Rocker oil feed to centre pedestal and rear"anti-rolling leaf" omitted giving conventional rear suspension.
  - 519B had entirely different front brake actuation (perrot)
  - 519C (colonial) had increased Ground clearance. None are known, so may not have been produced although catalogued.
  - 519S Shorter (3,300 mm (129.9 in)) wheelbase and 1,475 mm (58.1 in) track.

== Specifications ==
- Engine Type: Capacity Config Model Bore/Stroke CR
- Engine size: 4766 cc S6 OHV 85 140
- Cylinder: 12 valves total 2 valves per cylinder
- Power: (40 hp)
- Wheelbase: 3,300 mm (129.9 in)
- Track front: 1,475 mm (58.1 in)
- Rear 1,475 mm (58.1 in)
- Length: 4,365 mm (171.9 in)
- Length:wheelbase ratio 1.32
- Kerb weight 2,350 kg (5,181 lb)

== Construction ==
- Bore × stroke 85.00 millimetres (3.35 in) × 140.00 millimetres (5.51 in)
- Bore/Stroke ratio 0.61
- Displacement 4766 cc (290.839 cu in)
- Unitary capacity 794.33 cc/cylinder
- Aspiration Normal
- Compressor type N/A
- Intercooler None
- Max. output 78.1 PS (77.0 bhp) (57.4 kW)
- rpm 2600 rpm
- Specific output 16.2 bhp/litre 0.26 bhp/cu
- Top speed 127 km/h (79 mph)
- Power-to-weight 32.77 bhp/ton

== Collections ==
There is a Fiat 519 in the collections of the Museo Nazionale dell'Automobile in Turin.

== See also ==
- Fiat 804
