= Pierre Marco =

French racing driver (1896–1979)

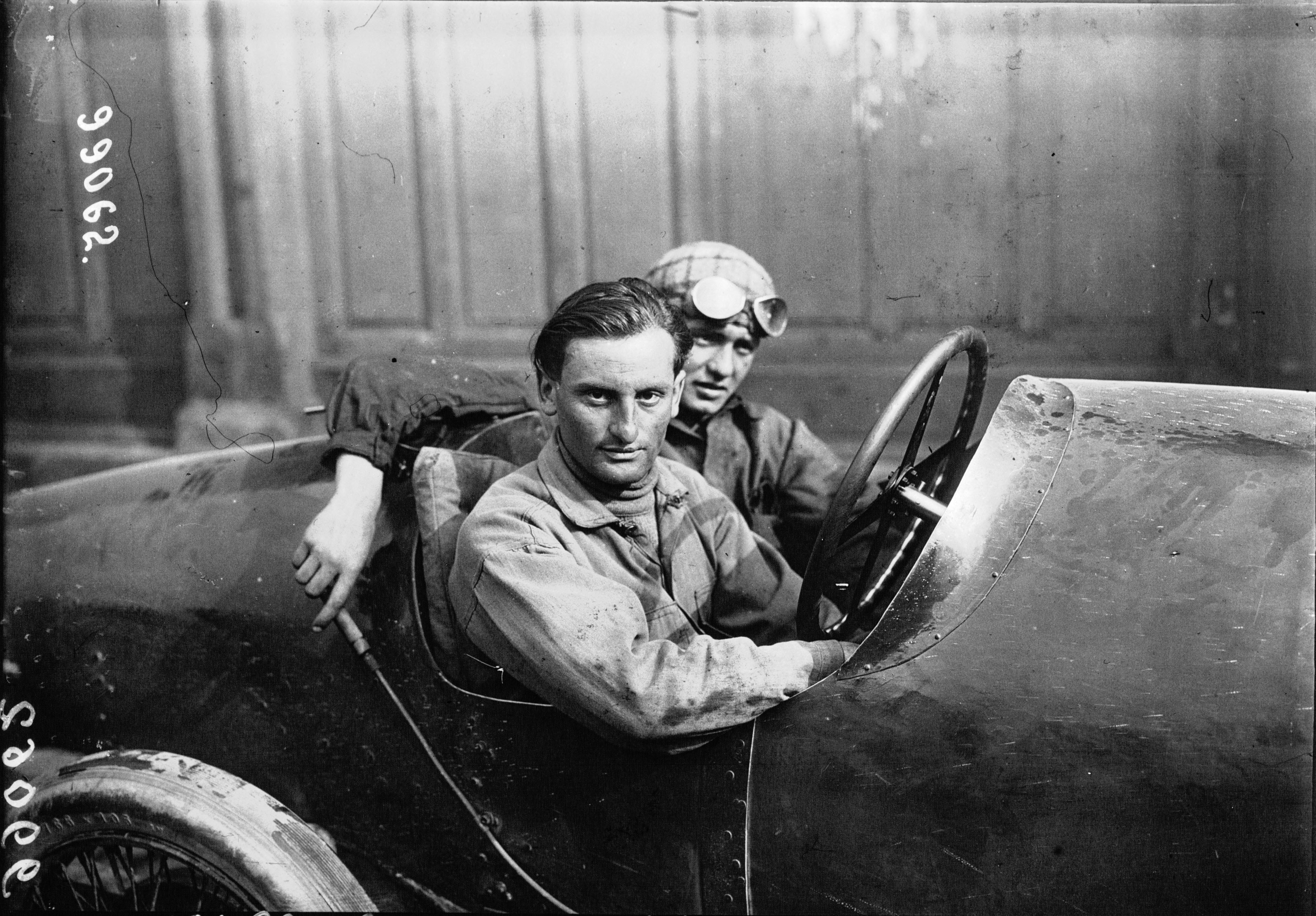
- Marco at the 1922 French Grand Prix
- Born: Pierre Marco; 22 July 1896
- Died: 29 September 1979 (aged 83) Molsheim, France

Pierre Marco (22 July 1896 – 29 September 1979) was a French racing driver.

== Career ==
Marco was promoted from mechanic to driver with the works team in 1920. After coming fourth in the 1921 Gran Premio del Veturette in Brescia in a Bugatti Type 22 (subsequently dubbed the Brescia Bugatti), he was promoted to the Grand Prix team in 1922. His Grand Prix debut, at the 1922 French Grand Prix, saw him drive steadily as other cars retired, and he was flagged off 3rd, the last of the drivers to complete the full distance within the regulation time.

Marco's only other Grand Prix drive came in the 1923 French Grand Prix, the Bugatti Type 30 rebodied with an aerodynamic covering and nicknamed the Tank. However Marco retired after three laps, the Tanks having arrived late, unsorted, untested, and (as it turned out) unreliable.

Afterwards, Marco concentrated on hillclimbs and rallies, winning the Toul-Nancy rally in 1929 and the Course de Côte du Ballon d'Alsace in 1929 and 1930, before retiring to take over the repair department at Bugatti.

== Corporate career ==
After the Second World War, Marco became a Bugatti director, and, after the death of Ettore Bugatti in 1947, works manager, although his time as manager was marred by disputes between him and Ettore Bugatti's oldest daughter, L'Ébé, as Marco was the choice of Bugatti's second wife (L'Ébé's stepmother). Marco left Bugatti in 1959, as a result of the fall-out of the disastrous Type 251 Grand Prix car, which Marco had supported and even demonstrated. Marco died in 1979 and was buried next to Ettore Bugatti, in Dorlisheim cemetery, Bas-Rhin department, France.
