= Biagio Nazzaro =

Italian racing driver (1890–1922)

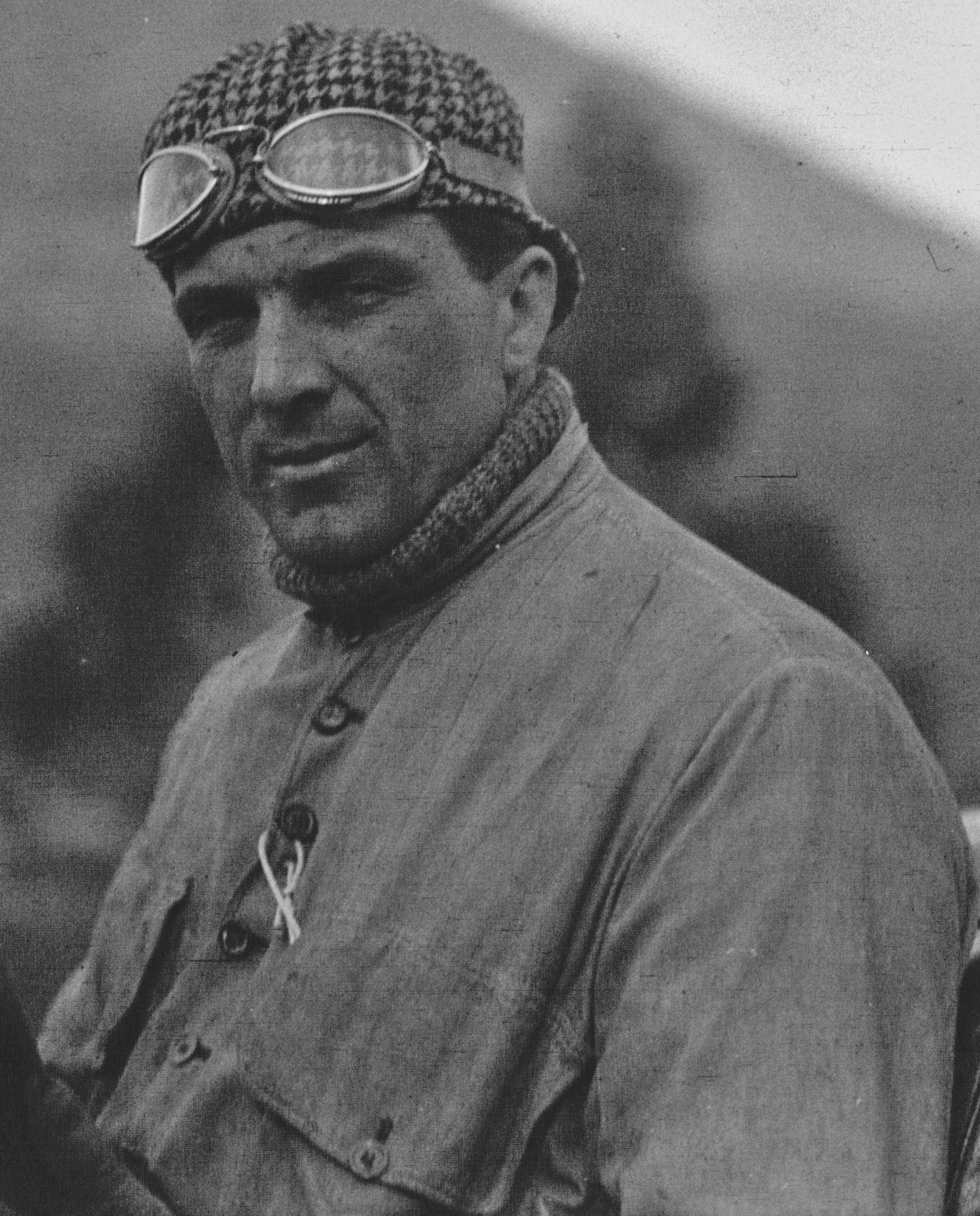
- Nazzaro at the 1922 Targa Florio
- Born: Biagio Nazzaro; 3 July 1890 Turin, Italy
- Died: 15 July 1922 (aged 32) Strasbourg, France

Biagio Nazzaro (July 3, 1890 – July 15, 1922) was an Italian racing driver.

== Career ==
The nephew of 1907 French Grand Prix winner Felice Nazzaro, Biagio was an aircraft pilot in the First World War and took up motorcycle racing after the War, winning the Italian Motorcycle Championship 500cc class in 1920, riding a Della Ferrera, and the 1000cc class in 1921, riding an Indian. In 1922 he switched to four wheels, driving for FIAT, for whom his uncle had a dealership. He won the 3 litre class of the 1922 Targa Florio at an average speed of 52.9 miles per hour.

== Death ==
Biagio made his Grand Prix debut at the 1922 French Grand Prix at Strasbourg, with his uncle as team leader. Running third late in the race, the rear axle on his Fiat 804 broke, sending him into a roll and inflicting injuries which proved fatal. His riding mechanic suffered a broken arm and leg.

A memorial in his honour was unveiled at the Strasbourg circuit 10 years after his death.

== Legacy ==
An association football team from Chiaravalle, ASD Biagio Nazzaro, is named in his honour.
