= Enrico Giaccone =

Italian racing driver (1890–1923)

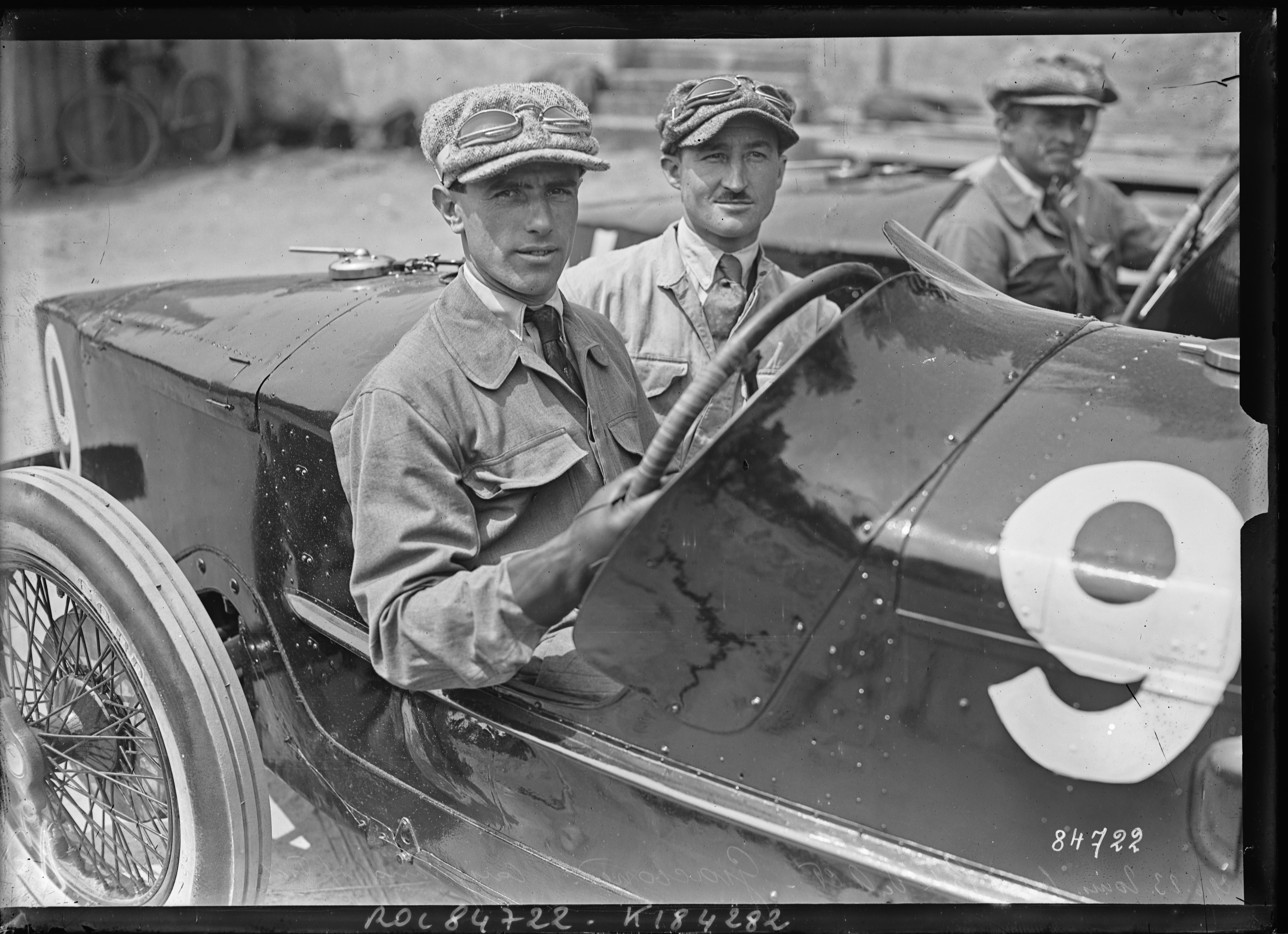
- Giaccone at the 1923 French Grand Prix (with riding mechanic Carignano)
- Born: Enrico Giaccone; 20 July 1890 Turin, Italy
- Died: 26 August 1923 (aged 33) Monza, Italy

Enrico Giaccone (22 July 1896 – 26 August 1923) was an Italian racing driver.

== Career ==
Giaccone had been employed as a test driver for Fiat SpA from a young age, and in 1922 was the marque's sole representative in the Targa Florio, driving his own Fiat 501. Giaccone came 5th overall and won his class. He made his Grand Prix debut at the 1922 Italian Grand Prix in a Fiat 804, although a broken gearbox meant he barely got off the grid. He did however come 2nd at the Gran Premio delle Vetturette, behind team-mate Pietro Bordino.

Giaccone did much better at the 1923 French Grand Prix, leading from laps 14 to 17 (half-distance), but mechanical problems sent him down the field, and he retired with a broken exhaust on lap 19.

== Death ==
On 26 August 1923, during a Fiat team test at the Monza circuit in preparation for the 1923 Italian Grand Prix, Giaccone was riding in a Fiat 804 with Bordino at the wheel. At the start of a five-lap fuel consumption run, the Fiat broke a spindle and lost a wheel, resulting in a collision which injured both drivers; although Bordino recovered enough to race in the Grand Prix, Giaccone died on admission to hospital.
