= Ernest Friderich =

French racing driver (1886–1954)

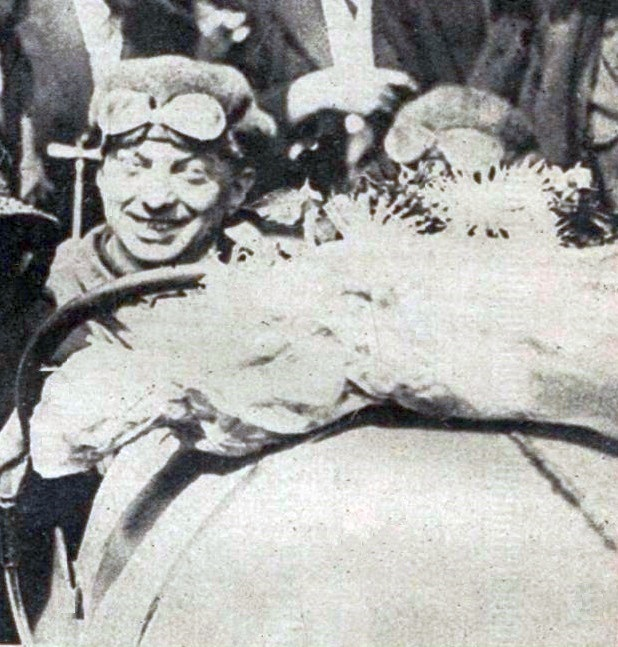
- Friderich (left), circa 1920
- Born: Ernest Jules Friderich; 23 October 1886 18th arrondissement of Paris, France
- Died: 22 January 1954 (aged 67) Nice, Alpes-Maritimes, France

Champ Car career
- 1 race run over 1 year
- First race: 1914 Indianapolis 500 (Indianapolis)
Wins	Podiums	Poles
0	0	0

24 Hours of Le Mans career
- Years: 1932
- Teams: Czaykowski
- Best finish: DNF (1932)
- Class wins: 0

Ernest Jules Friderich (23 October 1886 – 22 January 1954) was a French racing driver.

== Motorsports career results ==
=== Indianapolis 500 results ===
Year	Car	Start	Qual	Rank	Finish	Laps	Led	Retired
1914	34	18	87.730	22	15	134	0	Drive pinion
Totals						134	0	

Starts	1
Poles	0
Front Row	0
Wins	0
Top 5	0
Top 10	0
Retired	1
