= 1927 Grand Prix season =

Third AIACR World Manufacturers' Championship season

1927 AIACR World Manufacturers' Championship

Seasons
- ← 1926 none →

1927 Grand Prix season

Seasons
- ← 1926 1928 →

The 1927 Grand Prix season was the third (and final) AIACR World Manufacturers' Championship season and the second run to a 1.5-litre engine limit. In a dominant display, the championship was won by Delage, with team driver Robert Benoist winning four of the five Grand Prix.

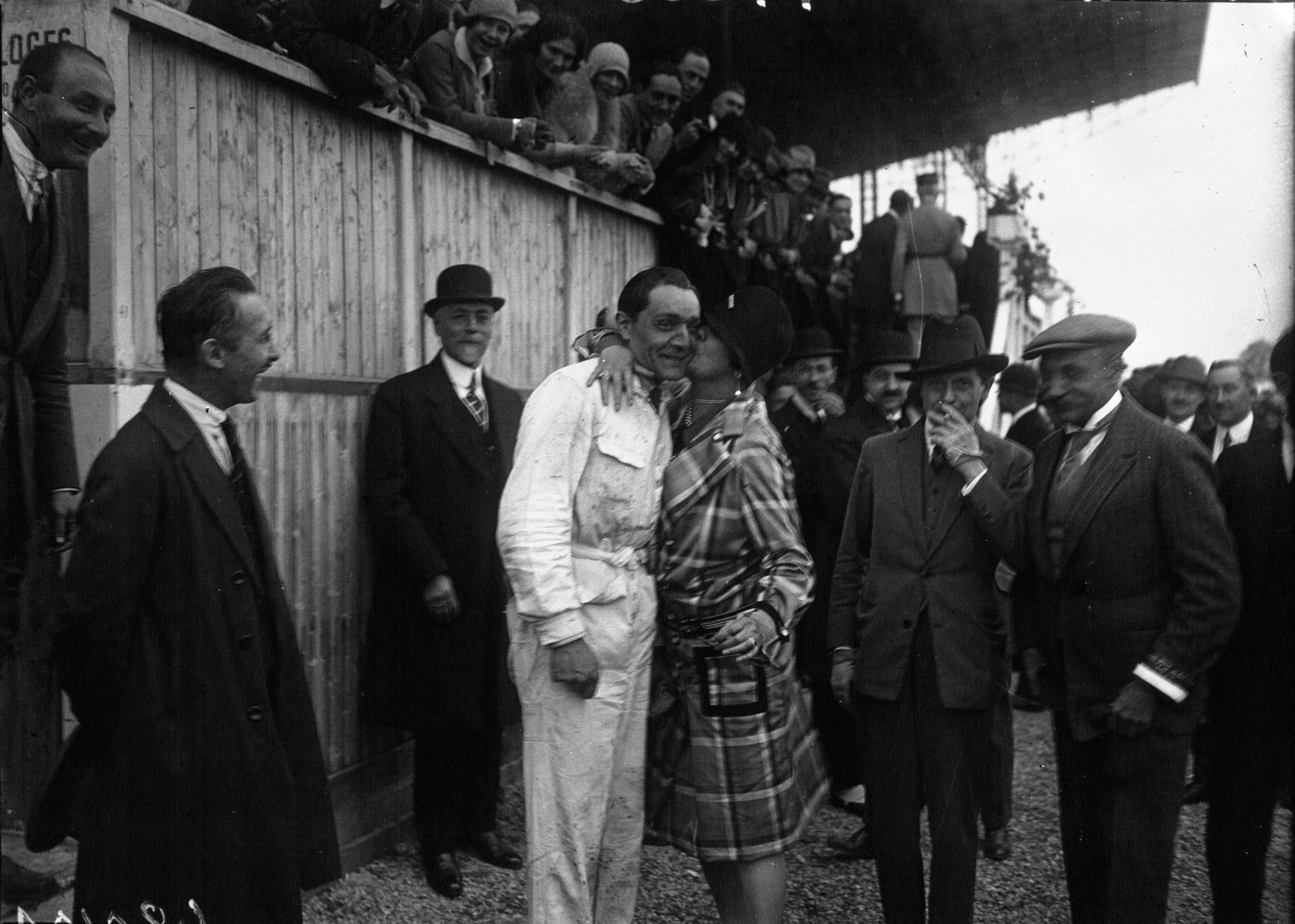
Robert Benoist, winner of four World Championship GPs in 1927

The championship opened with the Indianapolis 500 – once again a contest between Duesenberg and Miller engines. Previous year's winner Frank Lockhart started on pole position and led for over half the race until his car suffered a broken con-rod. Rookie George Souders, driving Peter DePaolo’s 1925 race-winning Duesenberg, came through and took a comfortable victory with an eight lap margin. DePaolo went on to secure the season's AAA Championship with three wins and four second places.

After major re-working over the close season to sort out the chronic exhaust and heating issues, the Delages proved unbeatable. They were the only manufacturer to enter the requisite three races to qualify for the championship. Bugatti and Talbot challenged them at the next Grand Prix, in France, but then the Talbot team was shut down. Three Americans, including Indy-winner George Souders, came over for the mandatory Italian round but their oval-track car-designs were unsuitable for European circuit-racing. The final round, the British Grand Prix attracted a bigger field, but once again Delage was able to romp to a dominating 1-2-3 victory.

It was already readily apparent that the 1.5-litre formula was not attracting consistent manufacturer interest. The AIACR had stated, before the season started, that from 1928 it would not continue this racing format but instead run its Grands Prix to an open Formula Libre, as most other European races were already being done.

The season had opened with the advent of a new road-race across northern Italy – the Mille Miglia was a race for touring cars from Brescia to Rome and back. Ferdinando Minoia led home a triumphant 1-2-3 for OM. In a rain-affected Targa Florio, Emilio Materassi kept control to win for Bugatti. His success continued and he went on to be the winner of Italy's inaugural Driver's Championship. The other significant event of the racing year was the opening of a major new racetrack in Germany. The Nürburgring was over 30 km of winding road with 172 corners, situated near the Ardennes Forest just across the border from the Belgian Spa-Francorchamps circuit. The opening race in June was won by Rudolf Caracciola in a 6.8-litre Mercedes sports-car.

== Manufacturers' World Championship ==
Rnd	Date	Name	Circuit	Race Regulations	Weather	Race Distance	Winner's Time	Winning driver	Winning constructor	Fastest lap	Report
1	30 May	(United States) XV International 500 Mile; Sweepstakes	Indianapolis	AAA	?	500 miles	5h 08m	(United States) George Souders	Duesenberg 91		Report
2	3 Jul	(France) XXI Grand Prix de l’ACF	Montlhéry	AIACR	cloudy	600 km	4h 46m	(France) Robert Benoist	Delage 15 S8	(France) Robert Benoist; Delage	Report
3	31 Jul	(Spain) III Spanish Grand Prix	Lasarte	AIACR	sunny	690 km	5h 21m	(France) Robert Benoist	Delage 15 S8	(France) Robert Benoist; Delage	Report
4	4 Sep	(Italy) VII Italian Grand Prix / V European Grand Prix	Monza	AIACR	rain	500 km	3h 27m	(France) Robert Benoist	Delage 15 S8	(France) Robert Benoist; Delage	Report
5	1 Oct	(United Kingdom) II RAC Grand Prix	Brooklands; Outer circuit	AIACR	cold, showers	530 km	3h 49m	(France) Robert Benoist	Delage 15 S8	not recorded	Report

The Indianapolis 500 also counted towards the 1927 AAA Championship Car season held in the United States

== Other Races ==
Major non-championship races are in bold Sources:

Rnd	Date	Name	Circuit	Race Regulations	Weather	Race Distance	Winner's Time	Winning driver	Winning constructor	Report
	6 Mar	(Italian Libya) III Gran Premio di Tripoli	Tagiura	Formula Libre; Voiturette	sunny	420 km	3h 10m	(Italy) Emilio Materassi	Bugatti Type 35C	Report
	13 Mar	(France) III Grand Prix de l’Ouverture	Montlhéry	Formula Libre cyclecar	rain	250 km	2h 02m	(France) Robert Benoist	Delage 15S8	Report
	20 Mar/ 29 Mar	(Italy) II Circuito del Pozzo	Verona	Formula Libre	sunny	250 km	1h 57m	(Italy) Gaspare Bona	Bugatti Type 35T	Report
	27 Mar	(France) III Grand Prix de Provence	Miramas	Formula Libre	rain then dry	250 km / 25 km*	(12m)	(Monaco) Louis Chiron	Bugatti Type 35B	Report
	17 Apr	(France) II Grand Prix des Voiturettes	Montlhéry	Voiturette	?	250 km	2h 19m	(France) Arthur Duray	Amilcar 6C	Report
A	**24 Apr**	(Italy) **XVIII Targa Florio**	Medio Madonie	Targa Florio	cloudy then rain	540 km	7h 36m	(Italy) Emilio Materassi	Bugatti Type 35C	Report
	8 May	(Italy) IV Circuito di Alessandria	Alessandria	Formula Libre	rain	260 km	2h 47m	(Italy) Gaspare Bona	Bugatti Type 35B	Report
	8 May	(Italy) I Coppa Messina	Monti Peloritani	Formula Libre	sunny	310 km	4h 14m	(Italy) Antonio Caliri	Bugatti Type 37	Report
	15 May	(Italy) V Circuito del Savio	Ravenna	Formula Libre; Cyclecar	sunny	290 km	2h 12m	(Italy) Gaspare Bona	Bugatti Type 35C	Report
	29 May	(Italy) IV Coppa della Perugina	Perugia	Formula Libre; Cyclecar	sunny	330 km	2h 57m	(Italy) Emilio Materassi	Itala Special 5.8L	Report
B	**12 Jun**	(Italy) **III Premio Reale di Roma**	Parioli	Formula Libre	hot	420 km	3h 47m	(Italy) Tazio Nuvolari	Bugatti Type 35	Report
	**12 Jun**	(France) III Grand Prix de Picardie	Péronne	Formula Libre	?	190 km	2h 02m	(France) Philippe Auber	Bugatti Type 37	Report
	19 Jun	(Italy) Premio di Bologna	Bologna	Formula Libre	sunny	120 km	1h 28m	(Italy) Emilio Materassi	Bugatti Type 35C	Report
	2 Jul	(France) Course de Formula Libre de l’ACF	Montlhéry	Formula Libre	rain	125 km	1h 02m	(France) Albert Divo	Talbot 700	Report
	2 Jul	(France) Coupe de la Commission Sportive	Montlhéry	Formula Libre	rain	400 km	3h 53m	(France) André Boillot	Peugeot 176	Report
	10 Jul	(France) III Grand Prix de la Marne	Reims-Gueux	Formula Libre	cloudy	400 km	3h 26m	(France) Philippe Étancelin	Bugatti Type 35B	Report
C	**25 Jul**	(Spain) V **Gran Premio de San Sebastián**	Lasarte	Formula Libre	sunny	690 km	5h 28m	(Italy) Emilio Materassi	Bugatti Type 35C	Report
D	**6 Aug**	**(Italy) IV Coppa Acerbo**	Pescara	Formula Libre; Voiturette	hot	510 km	4h 54m	(Italy) Giuseppe Campari	Alfa Romeo P2	Report
	7 Aug	(France) III Grand Prix du Comminges	Saint-Gaudens	Formula Libre handicap	?	410 km	3h 49m	(Tunisia) François Eysermann	Bugatti Type 37	Report
	14 Aug	(Italy) VII Coppa Montenero	Montenero	Formula Libre	sunny	225 km	2h 47m	(Italy) Emilio Materassi	Bugatti Type 35C	Report
	25 Aug	(France) IV Grand Prix de la Baule	La Baule	Formula Libre	sunny	100 km	50m	(United Kingdom) George Eyston	Bugatti Type 35B	Report
E	**4 Sep**	(Italy) **II Gran Premio di Milano**	Monza	Formula Libre	rain	heats + 50 km final	20m	(Italy) Pietro Bordino	Fiat 806	Report
	10 Sep	(France) VII Grand Prix de Boulogne	Boulogne-sur-Mer	Formula Libre	rain	450 km	4h 09m	(United Kingdom) Capt Malcolm Campbell	Bugatti Type 39A	Report
	18 Sep	(Germany) III Solituderennen	Solitude	Formula Libre	rain	21 km	12m	(Germany) August Momberger	Bugatti Type 35B	Report
	9 Oct	(Italy) V Circuito del Garda	Salò	Formula Libre	sunny	300 km	3h 30m	(Italy) Tazio Nuvolari	Bugatti Type 35	Report
F	**15 Oct**	**(United Kingdom) VII Junior Car Club 200**	Brooklands; Outer circuit	AIACR; Voiturette	cloudy	200 miles	2h 38m	(United Kingdom) Capt Malcolm Campbell	Bugatti Type 39A	Report
	16 Oct	(France) II Grand Prix du Salon	Montlhéry	AIACR	?	50 km	24m	(France) Michel Doré	Corre-La Licorne	Report
	28 Oct	(Italy) Apuano Circuit	Carrara	Formula Libre	?	?	?	(Italy) "Niccoli"	Bugatti	Report

Note: *Race stopped because of crowd-invasion of track

== Teams and drivers ==
These tables only intend to cover entries in the Championship Grands Prix and the major non-Championship races, as keyed above. Sources:

Entrant	Constructor	Chassis	Engine	Tyre	Driver	Rounds
(France) Usines Bugatti	Bugatti	Type 39A; Type 37A; Type 35C	Bugatti 1.5L S8 s/c Bugatti 1.5L S4 s/c Bugatti 2.0L S8 s/c		(Italy) Emilio Materassi	[2], 3, [4], 5; A, C, E
(France) Usines Bugatti	Bugatti	Type 39A; Type 37A; Type 35C	Bugatti 1.5L S8 s/c Bugatti 1.5L S4 s/c Bugatti 2.0L S8 s/c		(Italy) Conte Caberto Conelli	[2], 3, [4], 5; A, C
(France) Usines Bugatti	Bugatti	Type 39A; Type 37A; Type 35C	Bugatti 1.5L S8 s/c Bugatti 1.5L S4 s/c Bugatti 2.0L S8 s/c		(France) André Dubonnet	[2], 3; A, C
(France) Usines Bugatti	Bugatti	Type 39A; Type 37A; Type 35C	Bugatti 1.5L S8 s/c Bugatti 1.5L S4 s/c Bugatti 2.0L S8 s/c		(France) Jules Goux	[2]
(France) Usines Bugatti	Bugatti	Type 39A; Type 37A; Type 35C	Bugatti 1.5L S8 s/c Bugatti 1.5L S4 s/c Bugatti 2.0L S8 s/c		(Monaco) Louis Chiron	3, [4], 5; C
(France) Usines Bugatti	Bugatti	Type 39A; Type 37A; Type 35C	Bugatti 1.5L S8 s/c Bugatti 1.5L S4 s/c Bugatti 2.0L S8 s/c		(Italy) Meo Constantini	[2*]; C*
(France) Usines Bugatti	Bugatti	Type 39A; Type 37A; Type 35C	Bugatti 1.5L S8 s/c Bugatti 1.5L S4 s/c Bugatti 2.0L S8 s/c		(France) “Sabipa” (Louis Charavel)	3*
(France) Usines Bugatti	Bugatti	Type 39A; Type 37A; Type 35C	Bugatti 1.5L S8 s/c Bugatti 1.5L S4 s/c Bugatti 2.0L S8 s/c		(Italy) Ferdinando Minoia	A
(France) Automobiles Delage	Delage	15 S8; 2LCV	Delage 1.5L S8 s/c Delage 2.0L V12 s/c		(France) Robert Benoist	2, 3, 4, 5; [E]
(France) Automobiles Delage	Delage	15 S8; 2LCV	Delage 1.5L S8 s/c Delage 2.0L V12 s/c		(France) Edmond Bourlier	2, 3, 5
(France) Automobiles Delage	Delage	15 S8; 2LCV	Delage 1.5L S8 s/c Delage 2.0L V12 s/c		(France) André Morel	2, 3, 5*
(France) Automobiles Delage	Delage	15 S8; 2LCV	Delage 1.5L S8 s/c Delage 2.0L V12 s/c		(France) Albert Divo	5
(France) Automobiles Delage	Delage	15 S8; 2LCV	Delage 1.5L S8 s/c Delage 2.0L V12 s/c		(France) Robert Sénéchal	2*, 3*, 5*
(France) Automobiles Delage	Delage	15 S8; 2LCV	Delage 1.5L S8 s/c Delage 2.0L V12 s/c		(Belgium) Guy Bouriat	3*
(United States) Duesenberg Bros	Duesenberg	Type 91	Duesenberg 1.5L S8 s/c	F	(United States) Wade Morton	1
(United States) Duesenberg Bros	Duesenberg	Type 91	Duesenberg 1.5L S8 s/c	F	(United States) Benny Shoaff	1
(United States) Duesenberg Bros	Duesenberg	Type 91	Duesenberg 1.5L S8 s/c	F	(United States) Babe Stapp	1
(United States) Duesenberg Bros	Duesenberg	Type 91	Duesenberg 1.5L S8 s/c	F	(United States) Ralph Holmes	1*
(United States) Duesenberg Bros	Duesenberg	Type 91	Duesenberg 1.5L S8 s/c	F	(United States) Fred Winnai	1*
(United States) Duesenberg Bros	Duesenberg	Type 91	Duesenberg 1.5L S8 s/c	F	(United States) George Souders	4; E
(United States) Miller Automobiles	Miller	Type 91	Miller 1.5L S8 s/c	F	(United States) Dutch Baumann	1
(United States) Cooper Engineering	Cooper Miller	FD; Type 91 FD	Miller 1.5L S8 s/c Miller 1.5L S8 s/c	F	(United States) Earl Cooper	4; E
(United States) Cooper Engineering	Cooper Miller	FD; Type 91 FD	Miller 1.5L S8 s/c Miller 1.5L S8 s/c	F	(United States) Pete Kreis	1, 4; E
(United States) Cooper Engineering	Cooper Miller	FD; Type 91 FD	Miller 1.5L S8 s/c Miller 1.5L S8 s/c	F	(United States) Bennett Hill	1
(United States) Cooper Engineering	Cooper Miller	FD; Type 91 FD	Miller 1.5L S8 s/c Miller 1.5L S8 s/c	F	(United States) Bob McDonogh	1
(United States) Cooper Engineering	Cooper Miller	FD; Type 91 FD	Miller 1.5L S8 s/c Miller 1.5L S8 s/c	F	(United States) Jules Ellingboe	1
(United States) Locomobile Junior 8	Miller	Type 91	Miller 1.5L S8 s/c	F	(United States) Frank Elliott	1
(United States) Boyle Valve	Miller	Type 91	Miller 1.5L S8 s/c	F	(United States) Cliff Woodbury	1
(United States) Boyle Valve	Miller	Type 91	Miller 1.5L S8 s/c	F	(United States) Ralph Hepburn	1
(United States) Boyle Valve	Miller	Type 91	Miller 1.5L S8 s/c	F	(United States) Jack Petticord	1
(United States) Fred Clemons / Jynx	Miller	Type 91	Miller 1.5L S8 s/c	F	(United States) Wilbur Shaw	1
(United States) Fred Clemons / Jynx	Miller	Type 91	Miller 1.5L S8 s/c	F	(United States) Louis Meyer	1*
(United States) F. P. Cramer	Miller	Type 91	Miller 1.5L S8 s/c	F	(United States) Earl Devore	1
(United States) F. P. Cramer	Miller	Type 91	Miller 1.5L S8 s/c	F	(United States) Zeke Meyer	1*
(United States) Harry Hartz	Miller	Type 91	Miller 1.5L S8 s/c	F	(United States) Harry Hartz	1
(United States) Harry Hartz	Miller	Type 91	Miller 1.5L S8 s/c	F	(United States) Eddie Hearne	1
(United States) Harry Hartz	Miller	Type 91	Miller 1.5L S8 s/c	F	(United States) Ira Vail	1*
(United States) Bill White Race Cars	Duesenberg	Type 91	Duesenberg 1.5L S8 s/c	F	(United States) George Souders	1
(France) STD Motors Ltd (United Kingdom)	Talbot	700 GPLB	Talbot 1.5L S8 s/c		(France) Albert Divo	2, [3]; [C]
(France) STD Motors Ltd (United Kingdom)	Talbot	700 GPLB	Talbot 1.5L S8 s/c		(France) Louis Wagner	2, [3]; [C]
(France) STD Motors Ltd (United Kingdom)	Talbot	700 GPLB	Talbot 1.5L S8 s/c		(United Kingdom) William Grover-Williams	2, [3]; [C]
(France) STD Motors Ltd (United Kingdom)	Talbot	700 GPLB	Talbot 1.5L S8 s/c		(France) Jules Moriceau	2*
(France) SA des Automobiles; Jean Graf	Jean Graf	Spéciale	Dorman 1.5L S6		(France) Jean Graf	[3]
(Italy) Fiat SpA	Fiat	806	Fiat 1.5L L12 s/c		(Italy) Pietro Bordino	[4], [5]; E
(Italy) Fiat SpA	Fiat	806	Fiat 1.5L L12 s/c		(Italy) Carlo Salamano	[4], [5]
(Italy) Fiat SpA	Fiat	806	Fiat 1.5L L12 s/c		(Italy) Felice Nazzaro	[5]
(Italy) Officine Meccaniche	O.M.	Tipo 8C GP	O.M. 1.5L S 8s/c		(Italy) Ferdinando Minoia	4; E
(Italy) Officine Meccaniche	O.M.	Tipo 8C GP	O.M. 1.5L S 8s/c		(Italy) Giuseppe Morandi	4; E
(United Kingdom) Alvis Car & Engineering Co	Alvis	GP	Alvis 1.5L S8 s/c		(United Kingdom) Maurice Harvey	[5]; F
(United Kingdom) Alvis Car & Engineering Co	Alvis	GP	Alvis 1.5L S8 s/c		(United Kingdom) George Duller	F
(Italy) Officine Alfieri Maserati SpA	Maserati	Tipo 26; Tipo 26B	Maserati 1.5L S8 s/c Maserati 2.0L S8		(Italy) Alfieri Maserati	A
(Italy) Officine Alfieri Maserati SpA	Maserati	Tipo 26; Tipo 26B	Maserati 1.5L S8 s/c Maserati 2.0L S8		(Italy) Ernesto Maserati	A
(Italy) Officine Alfieri Maserati SpA	Maserati	Tipo 26; Tipo 26B	Maserati 1.5L S8 s/c Maserati 2.0L S8		(Italy) Conte Aymo Maggi	A
(Italy) Officine Alfieri Maserati SpA	Maserati	Tipo 26; Tipo 26B	Maserati 1.5L S8 s/c Maserati 2.0L S8		(Italy) Baconin Borzacchini	[D]
(France) SA des Autos et Cycles Peugeot	Peugeot	Type 174 Sport	Peugeot 3.9L S4		(France) André Boillot	A
(France) SA des Autos et Cycles Peugeot	Peugeot	Type 174 Sport	Peugeot 3.9L S4		(France) Louis Rigal	A
(France) Société Nouvelle de l'Automobile Amilcar	Amilcar	C6	Amilcar 1.1L S6		(France) André Morel	C, F
(France) Société Nouvelle de l'Automobile Amilcar	Amilcar	C6	Amilcar 1.1L S6		(France) Charles Martin	C, F
(France) Société Nouvelle de l'Automobile Amilcar	Amilcar	C6	Amilcar 1.1L S6		(United Kingdom) Vernon Balls	F
(France) Bucciali Frères	Bucciali	Buc AB6	Bucciali 1.5L S6		(France) Jean de Maleplane	C
(United Kingdom) Frazer Nash Ltd	Frazer Nash	Slug	Frazer Nash 1.5L S4		(United Kingdom) Archie Frazer Nash	F
(United Kingdom) Frazer Nash Ltd	Frazer Nash	Slug	Frazer Nash 1.5L S4		(United Kingdom) Brian Lewis; Baron Essendon	F
(France) Société des Moteurs; Salmson	Salmson	VAL	Salmson 1.1L S4		(France) Georges Casse	F
(France) Société des Moteurs; Salmson	Salmson	VAL	Salmson 1.1L S4		(France) Pierre Goutte	F
(France) Société des Moteurs; Salmson	Salmson	VAL	Salmson 1.1L S4		(France) Lionel de Marmier	F
(France) Société des Moteurs; Salmson	Salmson	VAL	Salmson 1.1L S4		(United Kingdom) George Newman	F

=== Significant Privateer drivers ===
Entrant	Constructor	Chassis	Engine	Driver	Rounds
Private Entrant	Miller	Type 91	Miller 1.5L S8 s/c	(United States) Pete DePaolo	1
Private Entrant	Miller	Type 91	Miller 1.5L S8 s/c	(United States) “Leon Duray”	1
Private Entrant	Miller	Type 91	Miller 1.5L S8 s/c	(United States) Tony Gulotta	1
Private Entrant	Miller	Type 91	Miller 1.5L S8 s/c	(United States) Frank Lockhart	1
Private Entrant	Halford Bugatti	Special; Type 39A	Halford 1.5L S6 s/c Bugatti 1.5L S8 s/c	(United Kingdom) Capt George Eyston	2, [3], 5; F
Private Entrant	Maserati Bugatti	Tipo 26; Type 35C	Maserati 1.5L S8 s/c Bugatti 2.0L S8 s/c	(Spain) Joaquin Palacio	3; A, [C]
Private Entrant	Bugatti	Type 39A	Bugatti 1.5L S8 s/c	(United Kingdom) Capt Malcolm Campbell	5; [F]
Private Entrant	Thomas	Special	... 1.5L S6	(United Kingdom) Harold Purdy	5; [F]
Private Entrant	Bugatti	Type 35C	Bugatti 2.0L S8 s/c	(Italy) Renato Balestrero	A, B
Private Entrant	Bugatti	Type 35C	Bugatti 2.0L S8 s/c	(France) “Sabipa” (Louis Charavel)	A, C
Private Entrant	Bugatti	Type 35B	Bugatti 2.0L S8 s/c	(Italy) Gaspare Bona	B, D, E
Private Entrant	Bugatti	Type 35B	Bugatti 2.3L S8 s/c	(Italy) Conte Aymo Maggi	B, E
Private Entrant	Bugatti	Type 35C	Bugatti 2.0L S8 s/c	(Italy) Tazio Nuvolari	B, E
Private Entrant	Alfa Romeo	P2	Alfa Romeo 2.0L S8 s/c	(Italy) Giuseppe Campari	D, E

Note: * raced in event as a relief driver. Those in brackets show, although entered, the driver did not race

== Regulations and Technical ==
The AIACR (forerunner of the FIA) kept with its 1.5-litre formula, despite the low manufacturer interest. The only modification to the regulations was that the minimum dry weight of the car was increased from 600 to 700kg. Although two seats were the usual, a single-seat was now also accepted if the seat was a minimum 80cm wide and 25cm high. This year, the European Grand Prix was awarded back to the Italian Automobile Club. Once again, each team had to compete in at least three of the races, including the mandatory Italian Grand Prix to qualify for the championship. All races were supposed to be at least 600km long, however the Italian and British Grand Prix did not meet this, and there is no apparent explanation why. At its October 1926 meeting, the AIACR had faced its reality that the 1.5-litre formula had not worked. The committee therefore agreed that the current format would only extend for one more year, to be replaced in 1928 by an open engine regulation.

With the Targa Florio, the organisers reduced the classes to just three – up to 1100, to 1500 and over 1500. This put the 2-litre Bugattis in the same category as the bigger-engined Peugeot and Alfa Romeo. The 1100cc cars only ran three laps, while the rest did five laps (with a maximum of 9 hours). Two occupants were mandatory for all cars. This year, as part of the ongoing stipulations from Peugeot who had won the Coppa Florio in 1925, that race was not held in conjunction with the Targa Florio. Instead, the Coppa was raced in France as a sports and touring car event.

Motorsport now started getting political. Italian leader Benito Mussolini, a keen follower of motor-racing, saw it as a propaganda advantage and an opportunity to enhance national prestige. So, this year the Italian Automobile Club set up its first national championship. It was to comprise twelve events, including the major races of the Italian and Rome Grands Prix and the Targa Florio, with a view of increasing competition and experience of Italian drivers. To promote Italian car manufacturers, a new event was organised – the Mille Miglia (“1000 Miles”). The concept planned by four wealthy gentlemen-drivers from Brescia, it was a race for touring and sports cars on public roads from Brescia to Rome and back and would soon become an iconic annual event.

=== Technical Innovation ===
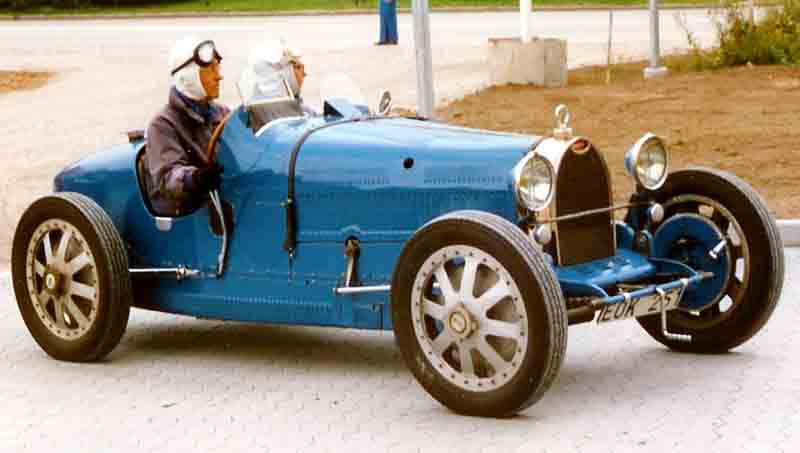
Bugatti Type 35C

Ettore Bugatti had a winning formula with his Type 35 chassis and its variants, and changed little over the close-season aside from fitting a larger supercharger to the Type 39A grand prix car. However, after the exhaust debacle of the previous year, Delage set about making fundamental changes to their car. The two superchargers replaced by a single one, while the engine block was reversed and offset from centre to move the exhaust away from the driver. The result was a greatly improved car.

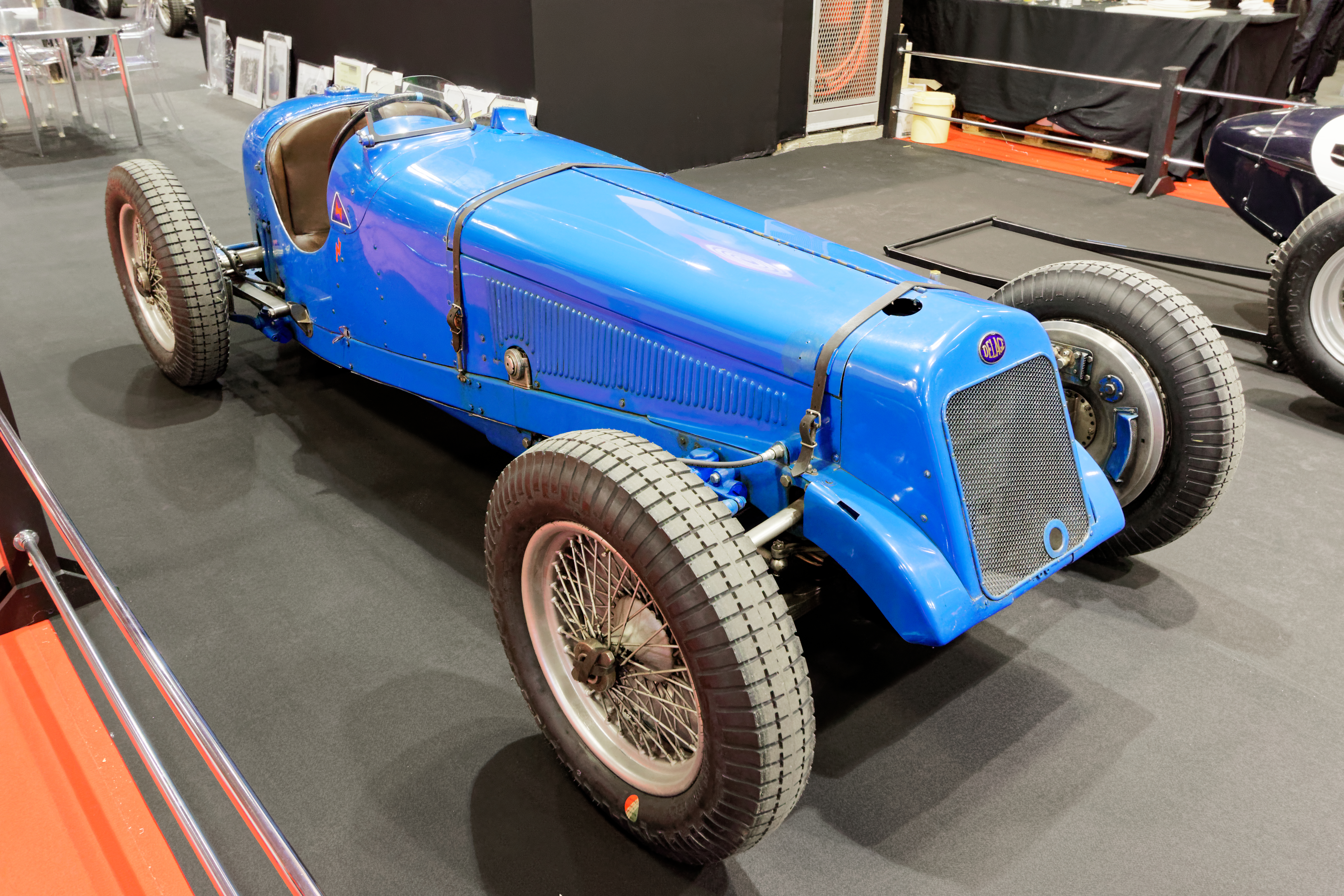
Delage 15 S8

The Maserati Brothers developed their first model, the Tipo 26, as the 26B with its supercharged straight-8 engine bored out to 2.0-litres. Fiat had retired from racing at the end of 1924. Yet in September, the astonishing new 806 model appeared at the Italian Grand Prix weekend. Designed by Carlo Cavalli and Tranquillo Zerbi, the V12 1.5-litre engine had two 6-cylinder engine-blocks mounted side by side on a common crankcase and geared together. With the valves driven by three overhead camshafts it could develop 185 bhp at 8500rpm. The engine unit itself was offset to the left with the driver in the right-hand seat and the fuel-tank beside him. The low profile gave it a blistering top speed of 250 km/h, easily 40 km/h faster than any of the current competition. That it only ever competed in one race left many commentators wondering what might have been.

In the United States, Harry Miller continued to develop his supercharged 1.5-litre engines. Designed for oval-track racing, his streamlined single-seater cars were powered by engines that produced 230 brake horsepower (bhp) when running on alcohol fuel. At the time, this output made Miller's engine among the most powerful racing engines in the world. During the year Eddie Rickenbacker, decorated war-hero and former racing driver, bought the Indianapolis Motor Speedway from Carl Fisher and Jim Allison for $700 000.

On 29 March, Henry Segrave became the first man to break the 200 mph land speed barrier in a Sunbeam 1000 hp Slug. Called Mystery, the car was powered by two 22-litre V12 aircraft engines.

Manufacturer	Model	Engine	Power Output	Max. Speed (km/h)	Dry Weight (kg)
(France) Bugatti	Type 37A	Bugatti 1496cc S4 supercharged	90 bhp	180	720
(France) Bugatti	Type 39A	Bugatti 1492cc S8 supercharged	120 bhp	190	740
(France) Delage	15 S8	Delage 1487cc S8 supercharged	170 bhp	210	750
(Italy) Fiat	806	Fiat 1484cc V12 supercharged	187 bhp	250	700
(Italy) Maserati	Tipo 26	Maserati 1491cc S8 supercharged	120 bhp	200	720
(Italy) Officine Meccaniche	865 GP	OM 1496cc S8 supercharged	118 bhp	195	715
(United States) Miller	Type 91 1927	Miller 1468cc S8 supercharged	230 bhp		
(United States) Duesenberg	Type 91	Duesenberg 1.5L S8 supercharged			
(United Kingdom) Alvis	GP	Alvis 1498cc S8 supercharged	95 bhp	190	750
(France) Talbot	700 GPLB	Talbot 1489cc S4 supercharged	140 bhp	210	700
(France) Bugatti	Type 35B	Bugatti 2.3L S8 supercharged	140 bhp	210	770

== Season review ==
=== The Italian road-races ===
A new event in March started the racing season. Four young gentleman-drivers (including Conte Aymo Maggi and Franco Mazzotti), wanting to restore Brescia's former pre-eminence in Italian motorsport, put a proposal to the government for a national road-race that was promptly approved. The race for touring and sports-cars harked back to the city-to-city races from the turn of the century. Called the Mille Miglia, as it covered a non-stop run across one thousand miles of public roads. It ran from Brescia to Rome via Bologna, before crossing the Apennines to Ancona and back to Brescia via Ferrara, Padua and Vicenza. It attracted many of the top Italian drivers and captured the imagination of country. Aymo Maggi himself, driving an Isotta Fraschini with Alfieri Maserati, was the first away at 8 am as the largest car in the field. Although Gastone Brilli-Peri in his Alfa Romeo led into Rome, after 21 hours, it was Ferdinando Minoia who arrived at Brescia first. In OM's finest hour, their cars finished 1-2-3 in the inaugural race of this iconic event, made all the better as the cars were built in Brescia.

The Targa Florio, in April, was the opening round of the new Italian Championship. Peugeot and Bugatti returned to renew their rivalry. This year Peugeot only had a single 174 S 4-litre sports car for André Boillot. Former Targa winner Bartolomeo Costantini was now the Bugatti team manager and brought four cars. Caberto Conelli had a 1.5-litre Type 37A, while the other drivers, veteran Jules Goux and Ferdinando Minoia, Emilio Materassi and liqueur-heir André Dubonnet, had the new 2-litre Type 35C. They were supported by a squadron of seven privateers making up half the field. In the absence of Fiat and Alfa Romeo, Italian honour would be upheld by Maserati. Alfieri Maserati drove the new Tipo 26B himself, while his brother Ernesto and Aymo Maggi had older Tipo26s. As the initial car was a non-starter, the first car left at 8:04 am. At the beginning Dubonnet and Boillot duelled for the lead. Conelli was first to arrive back at the line, but on elapsed time, Minoia had a five-second lead over Dubonnet with Materassi and female Czech driver Eliška Junková less than a minute behind. But going into the second lap, the order changed significantly. A third of the way around, Junková slid off the road when the steering rod broke. Soon after, Minoia retired with a broken universal joint and Dubonnet was having engine problems. Materassi set a new lap record opening a 6-minute lead over Maserati (who pitted with a flat tyre) and Conelli. Three Bugattis were fighting with the three Maseratis with Boillot's Peugeot in seventh. Rain started falling on the fourth lap making the roads treacherous, and causing several drivers to go off the road. But Materassi kept control throughout with he and Conelli getting a comfortable 1-2 victory for Bugatti, the third straight win for the team. Alfieri Maserati was twenty minutes back with Boillot in fourth, over fifty minutes behind the winner. Only six of the 22 starters were classified at the finish. Two weeks later, another race - the Coppa Messina - was held on the mountain roads of Sicily. Materassi crashed his Bugatti in practice but bought one of the works Maseratis to race instead. A Bugatti won again, but Alfieri Maserati was severely injured when he crashed, blinded by dust, overtaking two other cars. Several major newspapers mistakenly reported his death, however he did slowly recover despite losing a kidney.

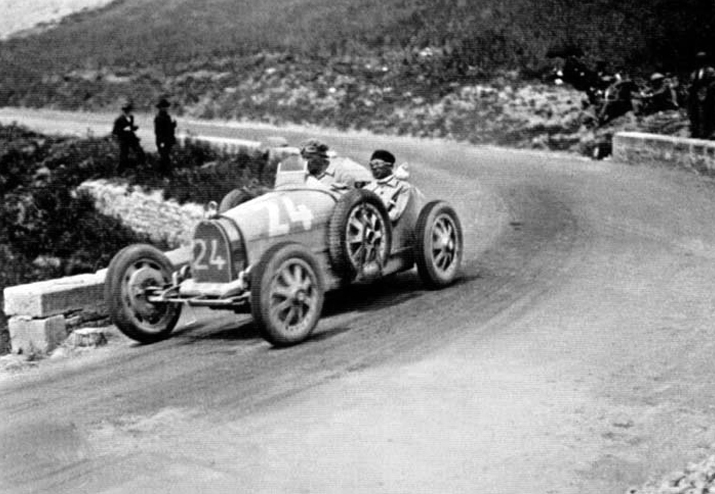
Materassi and his Bugatti, winner of the Targa Florio

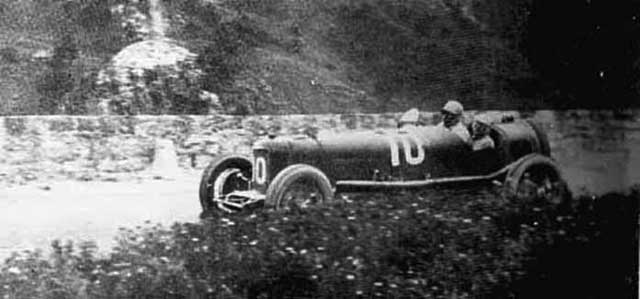
Ernesto Maserati before retiring in the Targa Florio

=== Indianapolis ===
Once again, the Indianapolis 500 would be a two-way contest between Duesenberg and Miller. All cars had either of those two engines. Harry Miller had dramatically developed his engine to an impressive 230 bhp. Rookie Dutch Baumann drove the works car, while a number of customer teams backed them up with experienced drivers like previous winners Frank Lockhart and Peter DePaolo, as well as Ralph Hepburn, Leon Duray, Harry Hartz and Eddie Hearne. The Duesenberg brothers had three works cars for Wade Morton and rookies Babe Stapp and Benny Shoaff. Another ten rookies started this year's race including Wilbur Shaw, Louis Schneider, Cliff Bergere and Fred Frame. Two-time winner Tommy Milton had been working on Cliff Durant’s new Detroit-Miller Special, and when the latter was too ill to race, Milton qualified the car. Former racer and champion Earl Cooper built four Miller-powered front-wheel drive specials, sponsored by the Buick Motor Company. His drivers were Bennett Hill, Pete Kreis, Bob McDonogh and Jules Ellingboe.

In qualifying, the 1927 winner Frank Lockhart set a new lap record of 120.9 mph. Joining him on the front row were DePaolo and Duray. Lockhart dominated the race for 120 laps until he was put out by a broken con-rod. In a race of attrition only ten cars were flagged. Rookie George Souders drove a reliable race in his Duesenberg and came through for the victory. It was the same car that Peter DePaolo had won with in 1925 although Souders had denied that at the time. Duesenberg was in line for a 1-2 finish until, with two laps to go, the rear gearing broke on Babe Stapp’s car that he was running relief for Benny Shoaff. Earl Devore inherited second place, finishing 12 minutes (effectively 8 laps) behind Souders. It was the largest winning margin since 1913 and Souders was the first driver to win the race without the help of a relief driver or a riding mechanic. There were several major incidents in the race. On lap 24, Norman Batten’s Miller caught fire. The driver stood up in his seat to drive it away from the pits to safety before jumping out. Soon after Jules Ellingboe was seriously injured when his car crashed into the wall and rolled.

In an abbreviated season of only 11 races, the 1927 AAA championship was won for the second time by Pete DePaolo, with 3 wins and 4 seconds. That consistency was better than second-placed Frank Lockhart's 4 wins alone. In 1926, after his mathematical work for college football, Professor Frank G. Dickinson at the University of Illinois developed a points system for the AAA. The 1927 championship used that, and the AAA retroactively calculated it on the previous seasons’ results going back to 1909 that would be published in their February 1929 bulletin.

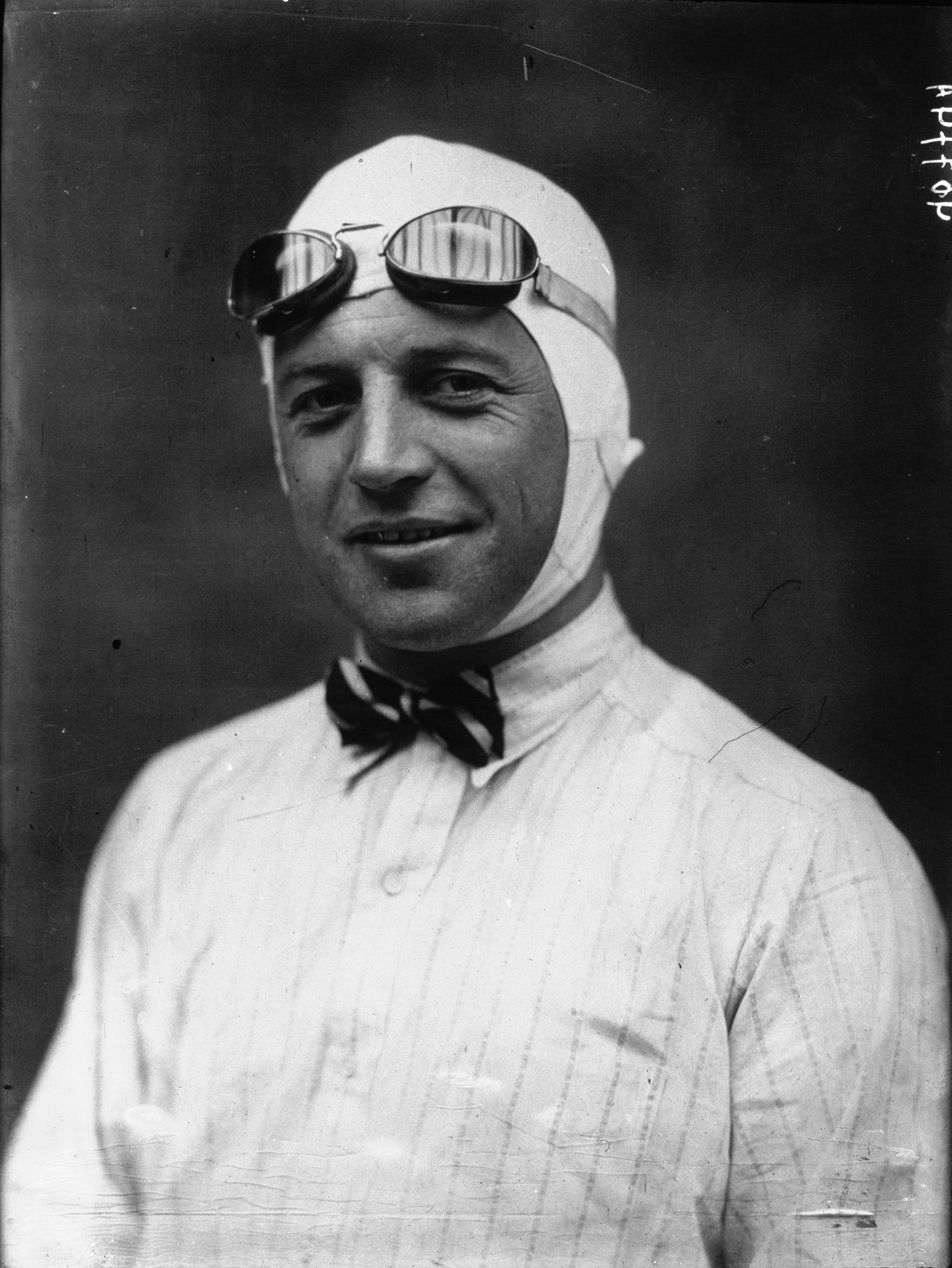
George Souders, winner of the Indianapolis 500

=== The Championship in Europe ===
The start of the European leg of the World Championship was the French Grand Prix, held at Montlhéry. Ten cars were entered, from four manufacturers. Bugatti had their drivers from the Targa Florio – Materassi, Conelli and Dubonnet. The Delage cars had been considerably revised and upgraded over the close-season. The team drivers were Robert Benoist, Edmond Bourlier and André Morel. The third trio was the Talbot team of Albert Divo, veteran Louis Wagner and William Grover-Williams. The final entry was the Halford Special, recently sold by Frank Halford to George Eyston. Earlier in the weekend, Divo had won the Course de Formula Libre in his Talbot, while Wagner and Williams raced Sunbeams but retired. After race-practice, Ettore Bugatti withdrew his team saying his cars were too uncompetitive, much to the anger of the big French crowd. Despite that, there was a close race with Divo leading Benoist and Williams at the end of the first lap. Wagner's Talbot had been left on the start line, unwilling to start, and he lost five minutes getting going. On the fourth lap Benoist and Williams both passed Divo, taking turns setting the fastest lap. But when Williams joined Morel and Eyston in the pits with engine issues, Benoist was able to open up a 2-minute lead over Divo. Just before the halfway point, Divo retired with a failed supercharger and the Talbot challenge was blunted with Wagner now a lap behind. While all the other cars had assorted issues, Benoist kept circulating at a rapid pace. Benoist ran away to lead a 1-2-3 victory for Delage. After the French Grand Prix, Louis Wagner announced his retirement. After a notable career, he was the last active driver from the original 1906 Grand Prix.

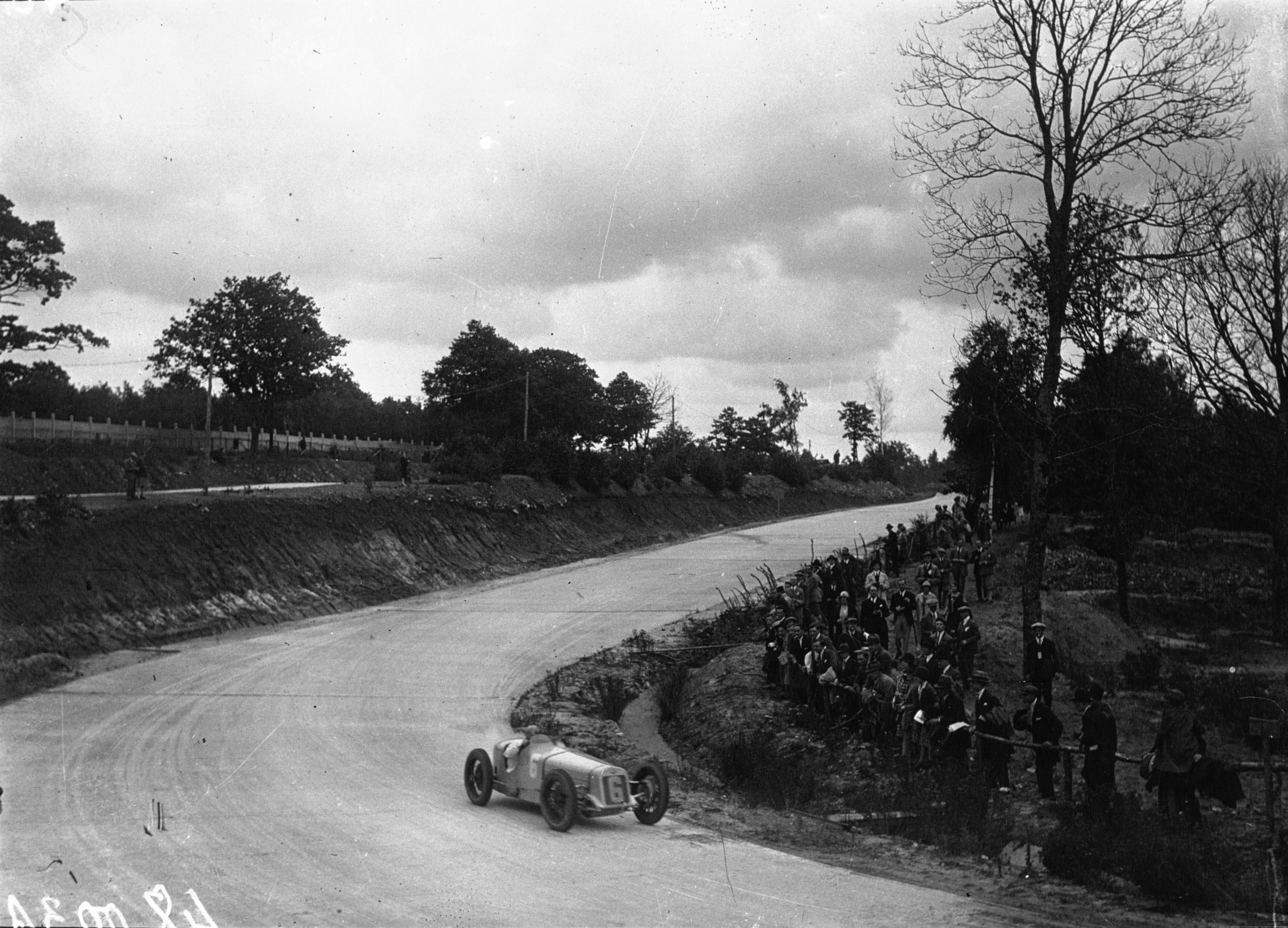
Benoist in the French GP at Montlhéry

By the time of the next Grand Prix, in Spain, Talbot had withdrawn from motor-racing with the company facing an uncertain financial future. Bugatti did arrive to contest the race with Delage. The seventh and final starter was local Bilbao driver José Joaquín Palacio driving a Maserati Tipo 26. At noon, from a rolling start, Benoist took the lead. Palacio's Maserati was immediately in trouble and out of the race. Benoist and Materassi pulled away from the others, over a minute behind by lap 5. Materassi lost a minute when he skidded at a corner and bumped a wall, but pitted early to refuel to get him to the end of the race. At halfway Benoist had his fuel stop and came out less than a minute ahead of Materassi. Conelli was a further minute behind for Bugatti, now well ahead of Louis Chiron (reserve driver for Dubonnet) and Bourlier. When Benoist had to stop again five laps later to change spark plugs, Materassi took the lead. When he then stopped to change a wheel, Materassi came out barely a car-length ahead of Benoist. They duelled back and forth for thirty minutes until Materassi cut a corner too tight, went off the road and hit another wall. Although uninjured, this time his car's suspension was too damaged to continue. Benoist only narrowly missed both the Bugatti and a quarry-wagon. Chiron crashed with four laps to go, and was fortunate not to get a serious head injury as he had chosen to wear a hard crash-helmet. These left only three cars in the race, leaving Benoist to take another comfortable victory, ahead of Conelli's Bugatti, and teammate Bourlier's Delage.

Bugatti failed to show, once again, at the nominally mandatory Italian Grand Prix. Fiat withdrew their entries for Pietro Bordino and Carlo Salamano, citing that the new cars were untested over a grand prix distance. But the Americans returned after a year away, with Indianapolis-winner George Souders in his Duesenberg, and Earl Cooper and Pete Kreis in front-wheel-drive Cooper-Millers. Delage confidence was such that only Benoist was entered. The American cars were designed for oval-racing and unsuited to the European road-courses. Compared to the five-speed gearboxes of the Delage, the Miller (used to rolling starts) only employed a two-speed gearing. It was ironic, that even though there were only six starters, the race had more manufacturers represented than in any GP race of the 2-year 1.5-litre formula.

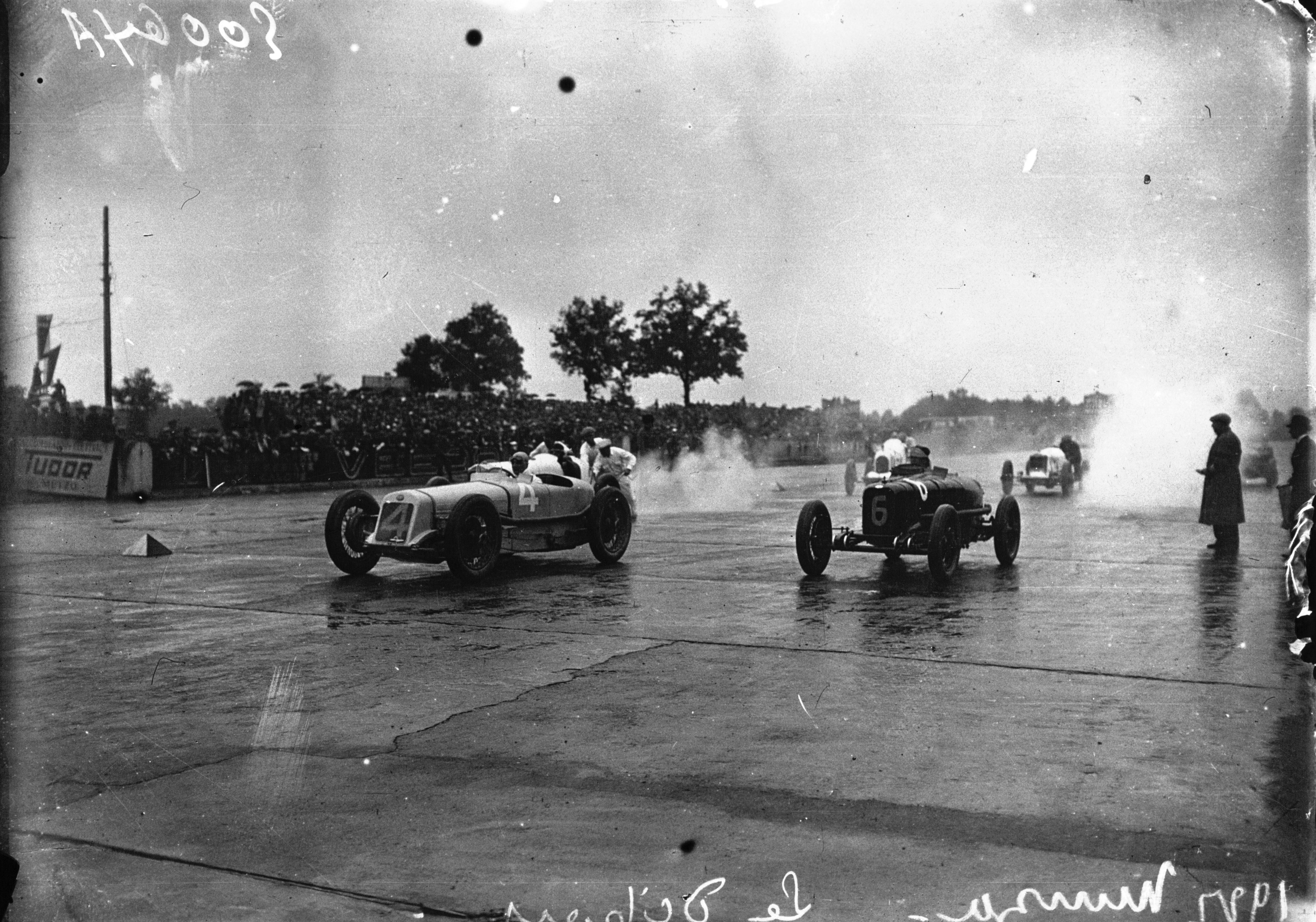
Start of the 1927 Italian GP

The race started in pouring rain, with Benoist jumping into the lead followed by Souders and Minoia. Cooper and Kreis crawled off the line and Morandi's OM would not start. The American cars were very disappointing: Kreis’ Miller did not finish the first lap, retiring with a broken crankshaft. Souders was running in second until he had to retire a dozen laps with rainwater in his fuel. Cooper was finding his car almost undriveable in the wet weather and stopped soon after to be relieved by Kreis. Meanwhile, Benoist had established his dominance, having lapped the field after ten laps and holding a 15-minute lead after thirty (300km). Benoist went on to win by over 20 minutes (4 laps) back to Morandi. Kreis had driven hard and was able to get up to pass Minoia for third on the last lap.

The British Grand Prix at Brooklands would be another Delage-Bugatti contest. This last race of the 1.5-litre formula provided the biggest entry list of any of the European rounds. Souders’ Duesenberg and the Fiats withdrew. The Bugatti team were Materassi, Conelli and Chiron. Delage's cars were driven by Benoist and Bourlier. Albert Divo was hired by Delage after the Talbot team was folded. British car company Alvis entered its latest front-wheel drive Grand Prix car for regular team driver Maurice Harvey. There were also three privateer Bugattis run by Malcolm Campbell, George Eyston and the Parisian-resident Romanian Prince Gheorghe Ghica-Cantacuzino. The final entrants were two Thomas Specials driven by Harold Purdy and William “Bomber” Scott. They were built by J.G. Parry-Thomas, based on the Leyland Eight luxury saloon chassis. The cars had been sold after Parry-Thomas was killed earlier in the year making a Land Speed Record attempt at Pendine Sands. For the sake of the neighbouring farms and houses, all the cars had to be fitted with noise-reducing exhaust mufflers.

The Saturday was cold and wet. In the morning, Harvey's Alvis broke its oil-pump and could not take the start. The remaining eleven cars could be lined up in a single row across the wide Railway Straight. In the heavy rain, Bourlier could not start his Delage, leaving his mechanics working on the car as the flag dropped. Materassi jumped into the lead, yet by the second lap, Bourlier had caught up and taken the lead. After only ten of the 125 laps both Thomas cars had dropped out and Eyston was having the first of many stops for sparkplugs. The Delage team had taken control, with Divo leading Bourlier and Benoist. Around the halfway point, most drivers stopped to refuel but Conelli, running in fourth, ran out of petrol and spent half an hour pushing his car back to the pits in the lashing rain. Chiron inherited his place but was already six laps behind the leader. Louis Delage issued team orders for his cars to finish in numerical order, which by opportune pit-stops was what happened - with Benoist winning from Bourlier and Divo. Chiron finished the 125 laps nearly half an hour later, and Materassi was flagged off still a further seven laps back.

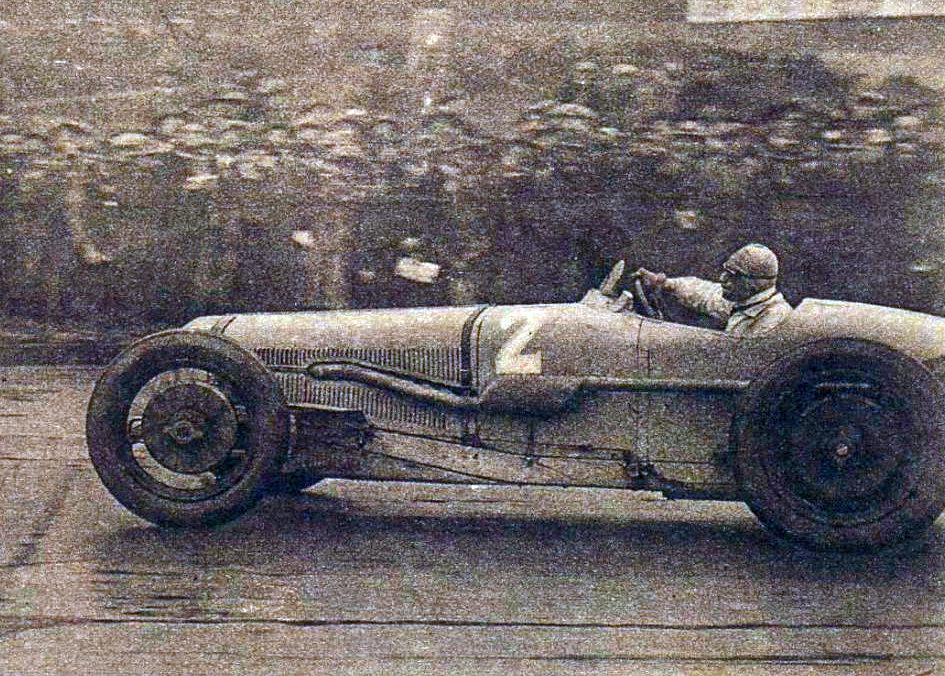
Benoist in his Delage at the British GP

The British drivers returned to Brooklands a fortnight later, in much better weather, for the JCC 200-miles. Campbell and Eyston both ran Bugatti T39As and had a terrific duel for the first half of the race until Eyston retired. This left Campbell to run away with a victory.

=== The other races and a single flash from Fiat ===
Throughout the year, a number of races had promising fields but then many drivers and teams would fail to show up for raceday. This frustrated the spectators, and early on in the season at the Provence Grand Prix, held at the Miramas oval, they expressed their displeasure. Heavy rain in the morning had delayed the qualifying races, then in the warm-up for the final, Robert Benoist crashed his Delage into two other cars forming up on the grid. Bruised and with a damaged car, he could not take the start. When the Talbot team then withdrew from the final, the crowd's disappointment turned to anger. With inadequate communication and security from the organisers, spectators starting spilling onto the track by the third lap. Some drivers kept racing, until the race had to be flagged after the fifth lap when Chiron was in the lead. People got to the Talbot pit and vandalised the cars, forcing Divo and Moriceau to make a hasty exit. After this fiasco, the organising company soon went bankrupt and the circuit fell into disuse. The Marne Grand Prix, held just after the French GP, was a win for Bugatti to a future star: Philippe Etancelin.

The San Sebastián Grand Prix was held the week before the Spanish Grand Prix. Both were held on the 17km Lasarte road circuit in the Basque country of Spain. Run to Formula Libre rules, a big field of 34 was whittled down to 17 starters mainly of 2-litre Bugattis and 1.1-litre voiturettes. Emilio Materassi led home his three Bugatti works teammates leading from start to finish, with Charles Martin finishing almost an hour later in sixth in his works Amilcar, as the first voiturette home.

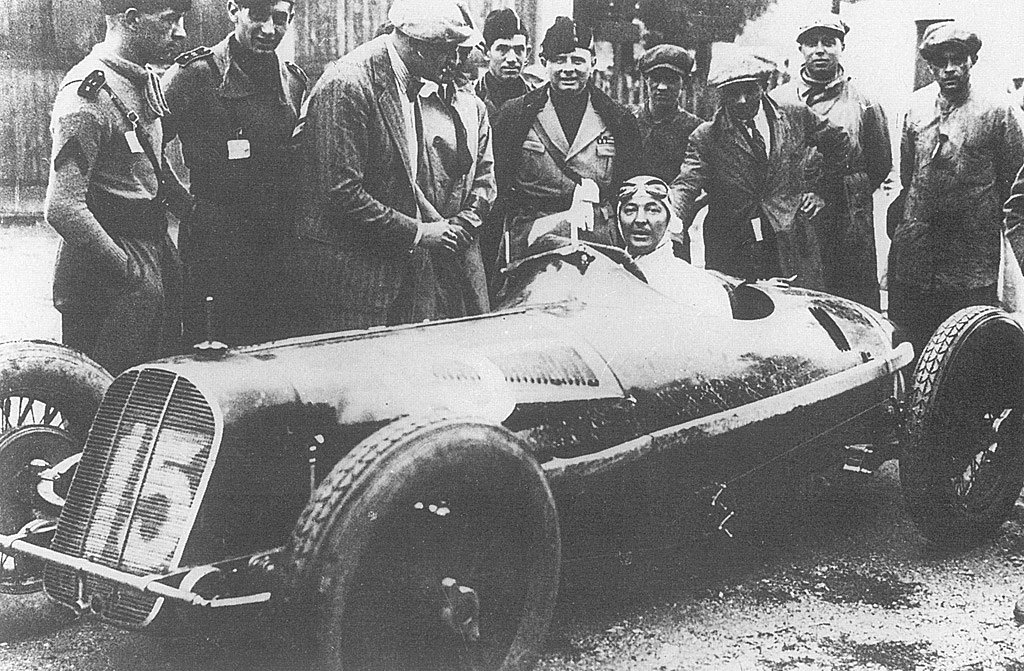
Pietro Bordino and the Fiat 806 at the 1927 Milan GP

Throughout the year, the inaugural Italian Championship had attracted big fields of 20-30 cars and good crowds. The Rome Grand Prix, back on the calendar after a year's absence, was held in the city on a circuit just south of the River Tiber. It was significant as it gave future great racer Tazio Nuvolari his first major win in a car. Previously a motorcycle champion he, like many compatriots, were swapping over to four wheels. His skills in his regular Bugatti, not needing pit-stops, gave him victory over a number of more powerful supercharged Type 35s. Unfortunately, there were several bad crashes when cars went off the road into spectators. They included Materassi, who crashed his Itala special, killing a young boy. Held on the same day as the Italian GP, the Milan Grand Prix saw the surprise appearance of a brand-new Fiat model. The 806 had a supercharged 1.5-litre engine, but Fiat chose not to enter it in World Championship race, despite its obvious power and speed. In a strange format, the 50km final would include the top-three finishers from three heats (divided by engine-class) along with the top-three placings after the fifth lap of the Italian GP. Unsurprisingly, after running a 4-hour, 500km Grand Prix, none of those three qualifiers (Benoist, Souders and Minoia) chose to then run in the Milan GP final.

Despite a slow start, Pietro Bordino was able to bring that power to the fore to easily win the short race.

=== The new Nürburgring ===
The official opening of a major new racetrack in Germany happened in June. The Nürburgring was similar in concept to the 22km Solitudering near Stuttgart: a windy circuit in the hills centred around the local Nürburg castle, near Koblenz. It came from a project driven by the mayor of Cologne to draw tourism to the Ardennes area in the west, as well as creating work for many unemployed in the region. Despite a 2.2 km main straight, the track had 172 corners and comprised the main 23 km Nordschleife as well as the 8 km Sudschleife. The opening race used the combined track and was won by Rudolf Caracciola in a 6.8-litre Mercedes sports-car. A month later, the second German Grand Prix was held at the track. Held for sports cars again, it was won by Otto Merz in a similar car. In Berlin, the AVUS circuit was modified with an intimidating 43 degree banking built on the Nordkurve.

Louis Delage had reportedly invested £36000 in improving his Grand Prix cars and announced his withdrawal from racing at the end of the season, selling the four cars. They continued to be very successful in voiturette racing well into the 1930s and beyond, last appearing in an F1 race in 1950. At Fiat, their pro-racing managing director, Guido Fornaca, died in January. The government-appointed board were shocked to discover the cost of developing the fantastic 806 and immediately closed down the racing department. They also ordered the 806, and earlier 804 and 805 models, destroyed instead of selling them to recover costs to a prospective queue of privateer racers. Italy's 1926 economic depression pushed many of the small manufacturers out of business.

After a successful season running his own Maserati 26, Itala Special 55 and Bugatti 35, Emilio Materassi was declared the first winner of the new Italian national championship. With the shutdown of the Sunbeam-Talbot racing team, Materassi bought the three works Talbot 700s to start his own racing team, the first of its kind. In the United States, Tommy Milton, 1921 AAA champion and two-time Indianapolis winner retired, taking up an engineering position at Packard. For Robert Benoist, with his unbeaten run in the World Championship, the reward was even greater – the president of France awarded him the country's highest honour, making him a Chevalier of the Légion d'Honneur.

The end of the season marked the end of the 1.5-litre formula. Increasing development costs and poor competition had conspired to discouraged manufacturers from entering. The next year would see an open engine limit, although the chassis weight minimum remained to ensure structural integrity and safety.

== Championship final standings ==
The table lists the highest race position for each manufacturer. Only the best finishing car gained points for its manufacturer.
Note: To be eligible for the championship, manufacturers had to take part in three of the five Grand Prix including the Italian GP. * non-participation disqualified the manufacturer from the championship

Pos	Manufacturer	500 (United States)	FRA (France)	ESP (Spain)	ITA (Italy)	GBR (United Kingdom)	Pts
1	(France) Delage		1	1	1	1	10
—	(United States) Miller	2			3	*	[23]
—	(United States) Duesenberg	1			Ret	*	[24]
—	(France) Bugatti			2	*	4	[24]
—	(Italy) O.M.			*	2	*	[26]
—	(United Kingdom) Talbot		4		*	*	[28]
—	(United States) Cooper-Miller	6			*	*	[28]
—	(United States) Detroit-Miller	8			*	*	[28]
—	(United States) Fengler-Miller	Ret			*	*	[29]
—	(United Kingdom) Halford Special		NC		*	*	[29]
—	(Italy) Maserati			Ret	*	*	[29]
—	(United Kingdom) Thomas Special			*	*	Ret	[29]
Pos	Manufacturer	500 (United States)	FRA (France)	ESP (Spain)	ITA (Italy)	GBR (United Kingdom)	Pts

Colour	Result	Points
Gold	Winner	1
Silver	2nd place	2
Bronze	3rd place	3
Green	Other finishers	4
Red	Non-finishers	5
Blank	Did not participate	6

== Results of the season's major races ==
Pos	Driver	Team	TGF (Italy)	IND (United States)	ROM (Italy)	FRA (France)	SEB (Spain)	ESP (Spain)	CAC (Italy)	ITA (Italy)	MIL (Italy)	GBR (United Kingdom)	JCC (United Kingdom)
	(France) Robert Benoist	Automobiles Delage				1		1		1	DNS	1	
	(Italy) Emilio Materassi	Usines Bugatti	1		Ret	DNS	1	Ret	Ret		Ret	Ret	
	(Italy) Giuseppe Campari	Private Entry							1		2		
	(United States) George Souders	Bill White Race Cars; Duesenberg Brothers		1						Ret	DNQ		
	(Italy) Tazio Nuvolari	Private Entry			1						DNQ		
	(Italy) Pietro Bordino	Fiat SpA									1		
	(United Kingdom) Malcolm Campbell	Private Entry										Ret	1
	(Italy) Caberto Conelli	Usines Bugatti	2				3	2				Ret	
	(France) Edmond Bourlier	Automobiles Delage				2		3				2	
	(France) André Morel	Automobiles Delage; Soc.Nouvelle de l'Automobile Amilcar				3	Ret	Ret					2
	(Italy) Carlo Tonini	Officine Alfieri Maserati			5				2				
	(France) André Dubonnet	Usines Bugatti	6			DNS	2	Ret					
	(United States) Earl Devore	F.P. Cramer		2									
	(Switzerland) Mario Lepori	Private Entry	Ret		2								
	(Italy) Giuseppe Morandi	Officine Meccaniche								2	DNQ		
	(Italy) Salvatore Marano	Private Entry	Ret		10				3				
	(Italy) Alfieri Maserati	Officine Alfieri Maserati	3										
	(United States) Tony Gulotta	Private Entry		3									
	(Italy) Renato Balestrero	Usines Bugatti	Ret		3								
	(United States) Earl Cooper	Cooper Engineering								3	DNQ		
	(Italy) Aymo Maggi	Officine Alfieri Maserati; Private Entry	Ret		Ret						3		
	(France) Albert Divo	STD Motors Ltd; Automobiles Delage				Ret						3	
	(United Kingdom) Vernon Balls	Soc.Nouvelle de l'Automobile Amilcar											3
	(Monaco) Louis Chiron	Usines Bugatti					4	Ret				4	
	(France) ? Charles Martin	Soc.Nouvelle de l'Automobile Amilcar					6						4
	(France) André Boillot	SA des Autos et Cycles Peugeot	4										
	(United States) Wilbur Shaw	Fred Clemons / Jynx		4									
	(Italy) Gaspare Bona	Private Entry			4				Ret		DNQ		
	(United Kingdom) William Grover-Williams	STD Motors Ltd				4							
	(Italy) Innocenzo Ciri	Private Entry	DNS						4				
	(Italy) Ferdinando Minoia	Usines Bugatti; Officine Meccaniche	Ret							4	DNQ		
	(Italy) Alfonso Zampieri	Private Entry									4		
	(Spain) Joaquin Palacio	Private Entry	5					Ret					
	(United States) Dave Evans	Private Entry		5									
	(United Kingdom) ? Edward Bret	Private Entry					5						
	(Italy) Guido Ciriaci	Private Entry							5				
	(Italy) Abele Clerici	Private Entry									5		
	(United Kingdom) Harold Purdy	Private Entry										Ret	5
	(United States) Bob McDonogh	Cooper Engineering		6									
	(Italy) Antonio Caliri	Private Entry	Ret		6								
	(United Kingdom) ? Lionel Lipmann	Private Entry									6		
	(United Kingdom) Bill Urquhart-Dykes	Private Entry											6
Pos	Driver	Team	TGF (Italy)	IND (United States)	ROM (Italy)	FRA (France)	SEB (Spain)	ESP (Spain)	CAC (Italy)	ITA (Italy)	MIL (Italy)	GBR (United Kingdom)	JCC (United Kingdom)

italics show the driver of the race's fastest lap.
Only those drivers with a best finish of 6th or better are shown. Sources:

Citations
