= 1927 Targa Florio =

Motorist road race

The 1927 Targa Florio was a Grand Prix motor race held on the 108 km Medio Circuito Madonie in Sicily, Italy on the 24th of April 1927. There were two separate races held simultaneously, one for up to 1100cc Cyclecars held over 3 laps for a total distance of 324 km, and the main race for Formula Libre cars over 5 laps for a total distance of 540 km. The Cyclecar race was won by Baconin Borzacchini driving a Salmson, while the main race was won by Emilio Materassi in his factory entered Bugatti.

== Report ==
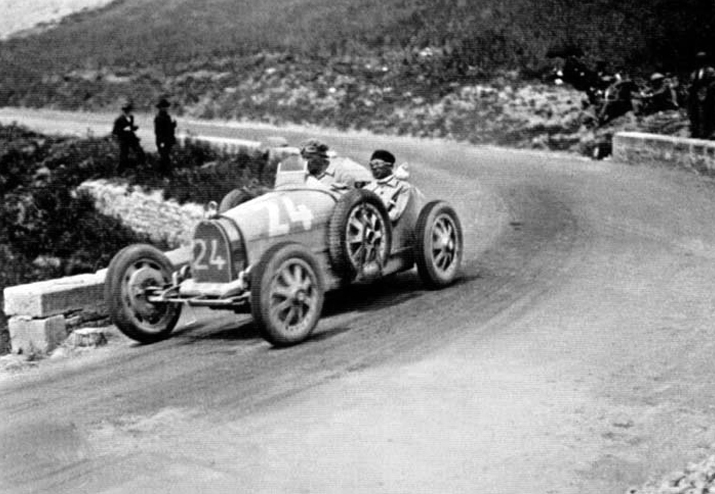
Emilio Materassi in his winning Bugatti

For 1927 entrants were divided into three classes based on engine capacity. Class I was for 1100cc Cyclecars, which would complete just 3 laps. Class II was for cars between 1100cc and 1500cc, and class III was for cars over 1500cc.

Cars started one by one, with class II cars starting first, followed by class III, at four minute intervals, and finally the four class I cars, at two minute intervals. First to depart would have been Innocenzo Ciri but he had crashed in practice, so it was Sabipa who was first away. Sabipa didn't make it far, however, crashing into a ravine on his first lap. Antonio Caliri would also fail to finish the first lap, and the Diatto of Valdes had several issues. The top half of the field was quite close after the first lap, with less than five minutes separating the top 9: Ferdinando Minoia lead, in 1 hour 26 minutes and 30.6 seconds, from Dubonnet and Materassi, all in Bugattis. Elizabeth Junek, also in a Bugatti, impressed many finishing her first lap in fourth place, followed by Alfieri Maserati (in a Maserati), Boillot in the only Peugeot, Lepori, Conelli (both Bugattis) and Maggi in a Maserati. Ernesto Maserati closed out the top 10, another 3 and a half minutes behind. Baconin Borzacchini's Salmson lead the small cars by over five minutes in 13th overall.

On the second lap two of the main contenders had to retire: Junek with a broken steering rod and Minoia with broken differential. Materassi drove the fastest lap of the race (1 hour 25 minutes 48.8) and took the lead, while Alfieri Maserati and Conelli also moved up the order to second and third respectively. Boillot struggled with a damaged exhaust releasing hot exhaust gases onto one tire, forcing him to stop twice to change wheels. Dubonnet also struggled with engine trouble. Borzacchini's lead in the 1100cc class had extended to nearly 7 minutes.

On the third lap, Conelli was able to close in on Materassi thanks to a pit stop for the latter the gap under a minute after three laps. Alfieri Maserati wasn't far behind, while Lepori, Maggi and Boillot were still in contention. Ernesto Maserati had to retire with a broken axle. Borzacchini won the 1100cc race by over 11 minutes, and decided to keep going as he was now seventh overall, although nearly 30 minutes behind Materassi. Fagioli, also in a Salmson, was second in the 1100cc race, but had to push his car over the finish line due to a broken fuel pipe. During the fourth lap, it began to rain. Materassi was able to extend his lead to around five minutes on Conelli, and 10 minutes to Alfieri Maserati. Lepori broke a wheel in an accident, and although he was able to replace the wheel and make it back to the pits still in fourth place, he would retire. Maggi also crashed his Maserati, but much to the surprise of his team was able to get back to the pits, around an hour later than expected, where he too would retire. Borzacchini was unable to finish the race, with a valve failure shortly after starting his fifth lap.

Conelli was the first car to finish the 5 laps, but was left to wait to see if he had won as Materassi had started 36 minutes after him. In the end Materassi would win by just three minutes. Alfieri Maserati lost time but held third followed by Boillot, while Joaquín Palacio was able to overtake Dubonnet for fifth place. Heinrich Eckert and Salvatore Marano both completed the full distance of five laps, but were not classified as they exceeded the maximum allowed time of 9 hours.

== Results ==
=== 1100cc Class ===
Pos	No	Driver	Car	Laps	Time/Retired
1	44	(Italy) Baconin Borzacchini	Salmson	3	4h59m03.0
2	42	(Italy) Luigi Fagioli	Salmson	3	5h10m36.6
3	40	(Spain) Ignacio Zubiaga	BNC	3	6h12m58.0
DNF	46	(Italy) Francesco Starrabba	Amilcar	1	Connecting Rod

=== Targa Florio ===
Pos	No	Class	Driver	Car	Laps	Time/Retired
1	24	III	(Italy) Emilio Materassi	Bugatti	5	7h35m55.4
2	6	II	(Italy) Count Caberto Conelli	Bugatti	5	7h39m06.0
3	26	III	(Italy) Alfieri Maserati	Maserati	5	8h01m36.0
4	36	III	(France) André Boillot	Peugeot	5	8h27m35.0
5	22	III	(Spain) Joaquín Palacio	Bugatti	5	8h33m52.2
6	38	III	(France) André Dubonnet	Bugatti	5	8h37m59.6
NC	14	II	(Weimar Republic) Heinrich Eckert	Bugatti	5	9h15m00.0
NC	8	II	(Italy) Salvatore Marano	Fiat	5	9h27m41.0
DNF	30	III	(Switzerland) Mario Lepori	Bugatti	4	Front axle
DNF	16	II	(Italy) Count Aymo Maggi	Maserati	4	Chassis
DNF	18	III	(Italy) Saverio Candrilli	Steyr	2	Wheel
DNF	10	II	(Italy) Ernesto Maserati	Maserati	2	Front axle
DNF	20	III	(Italy) Renato Balestrero	Bugatti	2	Carburetor
DNF	34	III	(Czechoslovakia) Elizabeth Junek	Bugatti	1	Steering
DNF	32	III	(Italy) Ferdinando Minoia	Bugatti	1	Differential
DNF	28	III	(Italy) Nivolò Valdes	Diatto	1	Driver injured, overheating
DNF	4	II	(France) "Sabipa"	Bugatti	0	Wheel
DNF	12	II	(Italy) Antonio Caliri	Bugatti	0	Oil pump
DNS	2	II	(Italy) Innocenzo Ciri	Bugatti		

== Sources ==
Grand Prix Race
1927 Grand Prix season
Previous race: 1926 Targa Florio	Targa Florio	Next race: 1928 Targa Florio
