= 1927 British Grand Prix =

- Race 5 of 5 in the 1927 World Manufacturers' Championship
- Brooklands circuit layout

Race details
- Date: 1 October 1927
- Official name: Grand Prix of the Royal Automobile Club
- Location: Surrey, England
- Course: Brooklands
- Course length: 4.21 km (2.61 miles)
- Distance: 125 laps, 526.25 km (327.00 miles)

Podium
First	(France) Robert Benoist	Delage
Second	(France) Edmond Bourlier	Delage
Third	(France) Albert Divo	Delage

The second Grand Prix of the Royal Automobile Club, commonly referred to as the 1927 British Grand Prix, was a Grand Prix motor race held at the Brooklands circuit on 1 October 1927. It was the fifth and final race of the 1927 AIACR World Manufacturers' Championship season. The race was won by French driver Robert Benoist. It was his fourth victory from the season's five races, a performance that put the seal on his Delage team's already-unassailable lead in the Championship.

A similar circuit was used as in the race the previous year, that is using the Finishing Straight, on which two sandbank chicanes were constructed. However, the footbridge across the Finishing Straight, which in 1926 had two supports on the track itself, had been rebuilt as a single-span, which enabled the full width of the straight to be used and allowed the layout of the chicane at the top of the Finishing Straight to be altered. The race itself also started half-way around the circuit, on the Railway Straight, rather than from the 1926 start at the junction of the Finishing Straight and the Members' Banking, meaning that the race distance was actually 124 and a half laps.

== Classification ==
Pos	No	Driver	Car	Laps	Time/Retired
1	2	(France) Robert Benoist	Delage 15 S 8	125	3h49m14.6
2	3	(France) Edmond Bourlier	Delage 15 S 8	125	3h49m21.6
3	4	(France) Albert Divo	Delage 15 S 8	125	3h52m20.0
4	12	(Monaco) Louis Chiron	Bugatti 39A	125	4h17m50.0
5	11	(Italy) Emilio Materassi	Bugatti 39A	118	
NC	10	(Italy) Caberto Conelli (United Kingdom) Williams	Bugatti 39A	106	
Ret	1	(United Kingdom) George Eyston (United Kingdom) Sammy Davis	Bugatti 39A	95	Supercharger
Ret	5	(United Kingdom) Malcolm Campbell	Bugatti 39A	93	Valve
Ret	14	(Romania) Jean Ghika-Cantacuzino	Bugatti 37A	28	Valve
Ret	7	(United Kingdom) Harold Purdey	Thomas Special	9	Transmission
Ret	6	(United Kingdom) Bummer Scott	Thomas Special	8	Supercharger
DNS^{1}	9	(United Kingdom) Maurice Harvey	Alvis GP		Oil pump
DNA	8	(United States) George Souders	Duesenberg		

Note: Fastest lap wasn't recorded.

Notes

- ^1 - Maurice Harvey did not start as they broke an oil pump in practice.

Grand Prix Race
Previous race: 1927 Italian Grand Prix	1927 Grand Prix season Grandes Épreuves	Next race: 1928 Indianapolis 500
Previous race: 1926 British Grand Prix	British Grand Prix	Next race: 1948 British Grand Prix
