= 1927 Spanish Grand Prix =

- Race 3 of 5 in the 1927 World Manufacturers' Championship
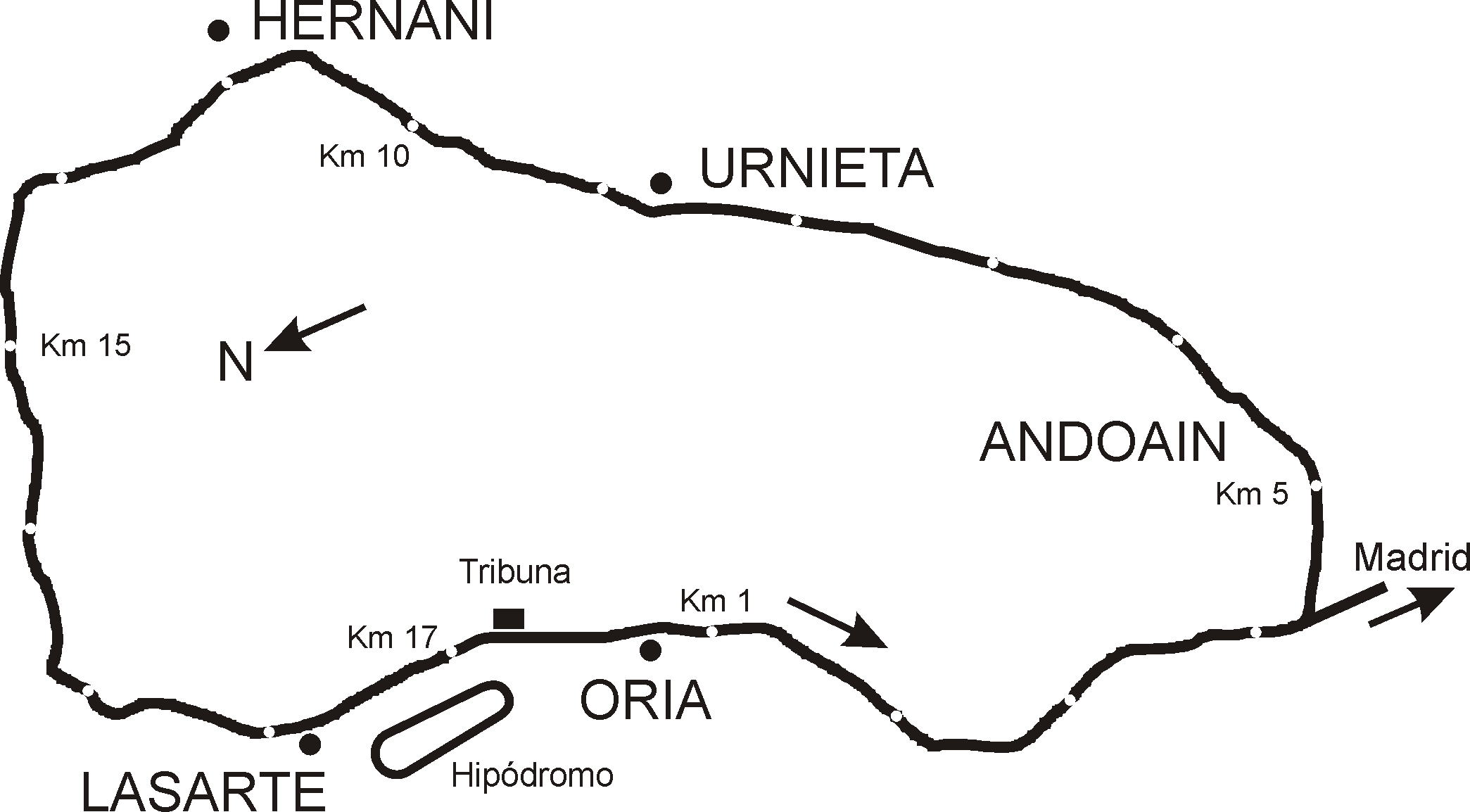

Race details
- Date: 31 July 1927
- Official name: III Gran Premio de España
- Location: San Sebastián, Spain
- Course: Circuito Lasarte
- Course length: 17.32 km (11.76 miles)
- Distance: 40 laps, 692.6 km (430.4 miles)

Pole position
Driver	(Italy) Emilio Materassi	Bugatti
- Grid positions set by car number

Fastest lap
Driver	(France) Robert Benoist	Delage
- Time: 7:33.2

Podium
First	(France) Robert Benoist	Delage
Second	(Italy) Caberto Conelli	Bugatti
Third	(France) Edmond Bourlier	Delage

The 1927 Spanish Grand Prix (formally the III Gran Premio de España) was a Grand Prix motor race held at Circuito Lasarte on 31 July 1927. The race was held over 40 laps of a 17.315 km circuit, for a total race distance of 692.600 km. The race was won by Robert Benoist driving a Delage.

== Classification ==
Pos	No	Driver	Car	Laps	Time/Retire
1	6	(France) Robert Benoist	Delage 15 S 8	40	5h20m45
2	9	(Italy) Caberto Conelli	Bugatti 39A	40	5h23m02
3	10	(France) Edmond Bourlier	Delage 15 S 8	40	5h28m12
Ret	12	(France) André Dubonnet (Monaco) Louis Chiron	Bugatti 39A	36	Crash
Ret	4	(Italy) Emilio Materassi	Bugatti 39A	31	Crash
Ret	14	(France) André Morel	Delage 15 S 8	15	Mechanical
Ret	8	(Spain) Joaquín Palacio	Maserati 26 (8C-1500)	5	Engine

Grand Prix Race
Previous race: 1927 French Grand Prix	1927 Grand Prix season Grandes Épreuves	Next race: 1927 Italian Grand Prix
Previous race: 1926 Spanish Grand Prix	Spanish Grand Prix	Next race: 1928 Spanish Grand Prix
