= 1926 Targa Florio =

The 1926 Targa Florio was a Grand Prix motor race held on the 108km Medio Circuito Madonie in Sicily, Italy on 25 April 1926. There were two separate races held simultaneously, one for up to 1100cc Cyclecars held over 3 laps for a total distance of 324km, and the main race for Formula Libre cars over 5 laps for a total distance of 540km. The longer race also featured the 1926 Coppa Florio which was open only to factory entered cars. The Cyclecar race was won by Baconin Borzacchini driving a Salmson, while the longer race and Coppa Florio were won by Meo Costantini in his factory entered Bugatti.

== Report ==
Competitors were divided into four classes based on engine capacity. Class I were the up to 1100cc cyclecars, Class II was for cars up to 1500cc, Class III for cars up to 2000cc, and Class IV for cars over 2000cc.

Cars started the race individually in order of race number, with a three minute interval between each car starting with class II, then class III, class IV and finally the class I competitors who only needed to complete 3 laps.

During his first lap, 2-time Targa Florio winner Giulio Masetti's Delage overturned, severely injuring him. He died shortly afterwards.

The main race was dominated by Meo Costantini's Bugatti, who lead from the start and never lost the lead, setting a fastest lap of 1 hour and 26 minutes on his fifth and final lap. Behind him, fellow factory Bugatti driver Ferdinando Minoia drove to a mostly unchallenged second place. Behind them the race was much closer. After the first lap, third to eighth place were separated by less than two minutes, with Emilio Materassi's Itala Special in third followed by Wagner, Dubonnet, Divo, Goux and Maserati. Dubonnet and Goux charged up the order on the second lap, moving up to third and fourth places respectively, making it a Bugatti 1-2-3-4, while Materassi dropped to sixth due to a pit stop. By the end of lap three, Materassi had pushed back up to third place, while Dubonnet had dropped to seventh as he made a pitstop.

Factory Delage drivers Divo and Benoist would then retire, mourning the loss of teammate Masetti. Goux was able to pass Materassi on the fourth lap, giving the Bugatti factory team a 1-2-3 which they would hold until the end, with Materassi finishing fourth, while Dubonnet was fifth, and first in Class II. After setbacks which dropped him as low as 12th, Maserati finished 8th and won Class III.

== Results ==
=== 1100cc Class ===
Pos	No	Driver	Car	Laps	Time/Retired
1	33	(Italy) Baconin Borzacchini	Salmson	3	5h14m40.4
2	32	(Italy) Ezio Rallo	Salmson	3	+19m16.4
3	30	(Italy) Ignazio Zubiaga	Austin	3	+22m39.6
4	29	(Italy) Gino Geri	Salmson	3	+33m02.0
5	35	(Italy) Francesco Starrabba	Amilcar	3	+49m49.4
6	34	(Italy) Claudio Sandonnino	Citroën	3	+1h15.44.6
DNF	31	(Italy) Salvatore Casano	Amilcar	1	
DNF	36	(Italy) Salvatore Comella	Salmson	0	

=== Targa Florio ===
Entrants who competed for the Coppa Florio shown in bold.

Pos	No	Class	Driver	Car	Laps	Time/Retired
1	**27**	**IV**	**(Italy) Meo Costantini**	**Bugatti**	5	7h20m45.0
2	**21**	**IV**	**(Italy) Ferdinando Minoia**	**Bugatti**	5	+10m04.0
3	**18**	**IV**	**(France) Jules Goux**	**Bugatti**	5	+15m11.4
4	19	IV	(Italy) Emilio Materassi	Itala Special	5	+23m41.6
5	15	III	(France) André Dubonnet	Bugatti	5	+24m13.0
6	**22**	**IV**	**(France) Louis Wagner**	**Peugeot**	5	+31m40.2
7	25	IV	(Italy) Renato Balestrero	OM	5	+59m50.0s
8	**5**	**II**	**(Italy) Alfieri Maserati**	**Maserati**	5	+1h16m26.0
9	8	IV	(Italy) Pasquale Croce	Bugatti	5	+1h24m36.8
10	6	II	(Italy) Antonio Caliri	Bugatti	5	+1h30m01.6
11	9	III	(Italy) Supremo Montanari	Bugatti	5	+1h38m36.4
12	23	IV	(Italy) Saverio Candrilli	Steyr	5	+2h15m10.0
DNF	20	IV	(Italy) Diego de Sterlich	Diatto	4	
DNF	1	II	(Austria) Edgar Morawitz	Bugatti	4	Crash
DNF	3	II	Pietro Mucera	Ceirano	4	
DNF	**12**	**III**	**(France) Albert Divo**	**Delage**	4	Withdrawn
DNF	10	III	(Switzerland) Mario Lepori	Bugatti	4	
DNF	**17**	**III**	**(France) Robert Benoist**	**Delage**	3	Withdrawn
DNF	4	II	Silvio de Vitis	Bugatti	3	Crash
DNF	28	IV	(Italy) Amedeo Sillitti	Alfa Romeo	3	
DNF	**14**	**III**	**(France) René Thomas**	**Delage**	2	Withdrawn
DNF	26	IV	(Italy) Giuseppe Vittoria	Diatto	1	
DNF	**24**	**IV**	**(France) André Boillot**	**Peugeot**	0	Engine sump
DNF	11	III	(Italy) Lorenzo Messeri	Bugatti	0	
DNF	13	III	(Italy) Giulio Masetti	Delage	0	Fatal crash
DNF	7	II	(Italy) Nicolò Maraini	Bugatti	0	Crash

== Sources ==
Grand Prix Race
1926 Grand Prix season
Previous race: 1925 Targa Florio	Targa Florio	Next race: 1927 Targa Florio
