= 1927 Rome Grand Prix =

Race details
- Date: 12 June 1927
- Official name: III Reale Premio Di Roma
- Location: Rome, Italy
- Course: Circuito Parioli
- Course length: 4.2 km (2.61 miles)
- Distance: 100 laps, 420 km (261 miles)

Pole position
Driver	(Italy) Emilio Bonamico	Bugatti
- Grid positions set by car number

Fastest lap
Driver	(Italy) Emilio Materassi	Itala
- Time: 2:04.0

Podium
First	(Italy) Tazio Nuvolari	Bugatti
Second	(Switzerland) Mario Lepori	Bugatti
Third	(Italy) Renato Balestrero	Bugatti

The 1927 Rome Grand Prix (formally the III Reale Premio Di Roma) was a Grand Prix motor race held at Circuito Parioli on 12 June 1927. The race was held over 100 laps of a 4.2 km circuit, for a total race distance of 420 km. The race was won by Tazio Nuvolari driving a Bugatti. This race marked the first and only time the Rome Grand Prix was held in Parioli.

== Classification ==
Pos	No	Driver	Car	Laps	Time/Retired
1	28	(Italy) Tazio Nuvolari	Bugatti	100	3h47m28.0
2	18	(Switzerland) Mario Lepori	Bugatti	100	+45.0
3	20	(Italy) Renato Balestrero	Bugatti	100	+6m03.0
4	4	(Italy) Gaspare Bona	Bugatti	100	+14m09.8
5	36	(Italy) Carlo Tonini	Maserati	100	+21m33.4
6	22	(Italy) Antonino Carliri	Bugatti	100	+22m49.2
7	26	(Italy) Adolfo Sansoni	Bugatti	100	+23m05.0
8	44	(Italy) Cesare Pastore	Bugatti	100	+24m41,2
9	46	(Italy) Diego de Sterlich	Maserati	100	+33m46.0
10	34	(Italy) Salvatore Marano	Bugatti	100	+34m24.4
DNF	16	(Italy) Luigi Forte	Bugatti	85	
DNF	24	(Italy) Aymo Maggi	Bugatti	60	Clutch
DNF	12	(Italy) Domenico Antonelli	Bugatti	59	
DNF	8	(Italy) Louise Vernier	Hudson	42	Withdrawn
DNF	50	(Italy) Giovanni Cutelli	Bugatti	41	Withdrawn
DNF	2	(Italy) Emilio Bonamico	Bugatti	30	Withdrawn
DNF	6	(Italy) Emilio Materassi	Itala Special	30	Crash
DNF	42	(Italy) Pietro Pino	Bugatti	9	Ignition
DNF	10	(Italy) Giorgio Ceratto	Delage	1	Crash
