= 1927 Italian Grand Prix =

- Race 4 of 5 in the 1927 World Manufacturers' Championship

Race details
- Date: 4 September 1927
- Official name: VII Gran Premio d'Italia; V Gran Premio d'Europa
- Location: Monza, Italy
- Course: Autodromo Nazionale di Monza
- Course length: 10.00 km (6.21 miles)
- Distance: 50 laps, 500 km (310.7 miles)
- Weather: Rain

Pole position
Driver	(United States) Pete Kreis	Cooper-Miller
- Grid positions set by car number

Fastest lap
Driver	(France) Robert Benoist	Delage
- Time: 3:57.2

Podium
First	(France) Robert Benoist	Delage
Second	(Italy) Giuseppe Morandi	OM
Third	(United States) Earl Cooper; (United States) Pete Kreis	Cooper-Miller

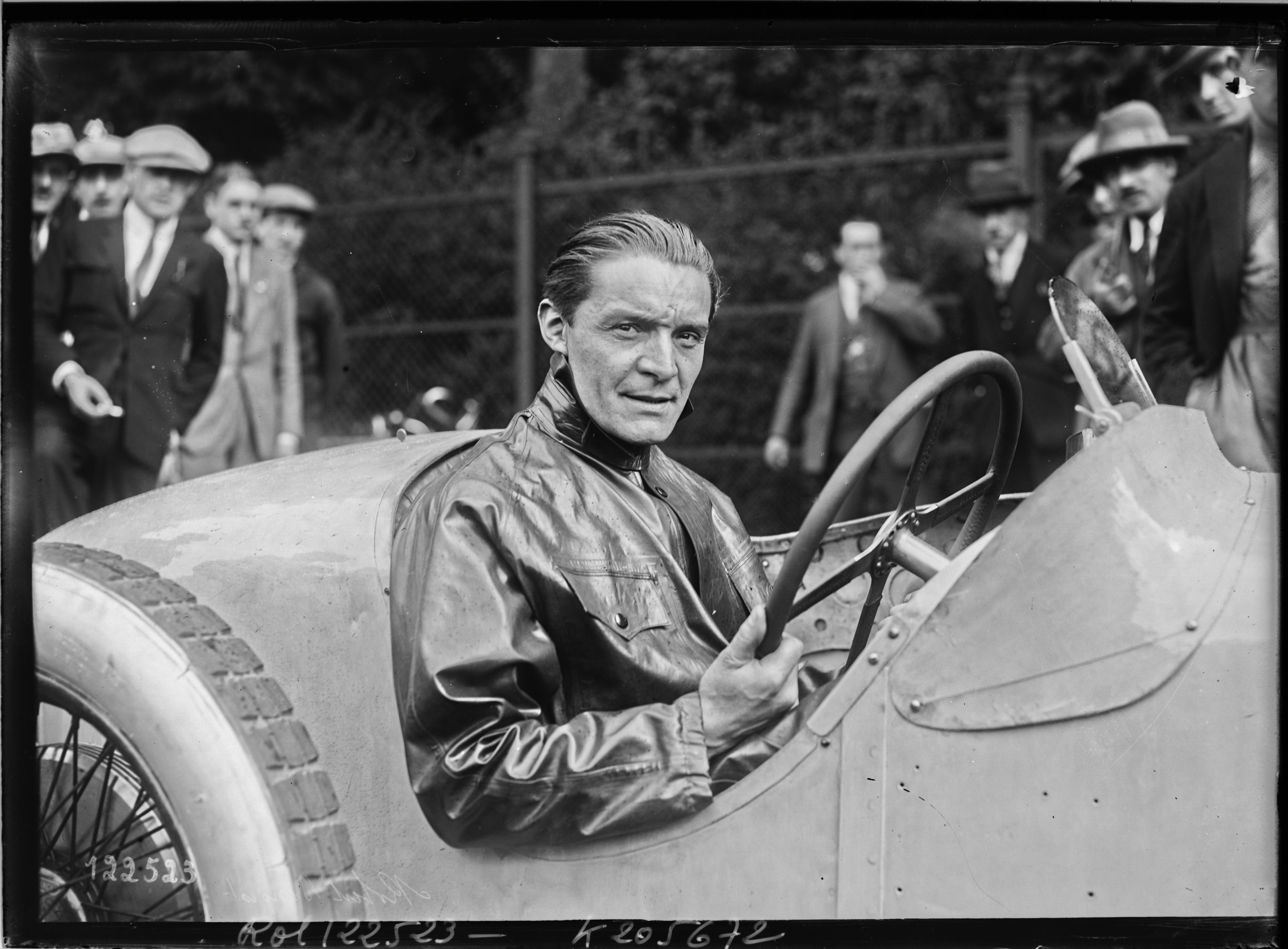
Robert Benoist

The 1927 Italian Grand Prix was a Grand Prix motor race held at Monza on 4 September 1927.

It was part of the 1927 AIACR World Manufacturers' Championship season.

== Classification ==
Pos	No	Driver	Car	Laps	Time/Retired
1	4	(France) Robert Benoist	Delage 15 S 8	50	3h26m59.8
2	12	(Italy) Giuseppe Morandi	OM 8C GP	50	3h49m32.6
3	10	(United States) Earl Cooper	Cooper-Miller Special	50	4h02m05.8
3	10	(United States) Pete Kreis	Cooper-Miller Special	50	4h02m05.8
4	6	(Italy) Ferdinando Minoia	OM 8C GP	50	4h02m28.6
Ret	8	(United States) George Souders	Duesenberg Special	13	Water in fuel
Ret	2	(United States) Pete Kreis	Cooper-Miller Special	1	Engine

Grand Prix Race
Previous race: 1927 Spanish Grand Prix	1927 Grand Prix season Grandes Épreuves	Next race: 1927 British Grand Prix
Previous race: 1926 Italian Grand Prix	Italian Grand Prix	Next race: 1928 Italian Grand Prix
Previous race: 1926 San Sebastián Grand Prix	European Grand Prix (Designated European Grand Prix)	Next race: 1928 Italian Grand Prix
