= 1927 French Grand Prix =

Race 2 of 5 in the 1927 World Manufacturers' Championship
← Previous race	Next race →

Race details
- Date: 3 July 1927
- Official name: XXI Grand Prix de l'Automobile Club de France
- Location: Montlhéry, France
- Course: Autodrome de Montlhéry
- Course length: 12.5 km (7.8 mi)
- Distance: 48 laps, 600 km (370 mi)

Pole position
Driver	(United Kingdom) George Eyston	Halford
- Grid positions set by ballot

Fastest lap
Driver	(France) Robert Benoist	Delage
- Time: 5:41.0

Podium
First	(France) Robert Benoist	Delage
Second	(France) Edmond Bourlier	Delage
Third	(France) André Morel	Delage

The 1927 French Grand Prix (formally the XXI Grand Prix de l'A.C.F.) was a Grand Prix motor race held at Montlhèry on 3 July 1927. The race was held over 48 laps of a 12.50 km course for a total distance of 600.00 km and was won by Robert Benoist driving a Delage.

== Background ==
The World Championship was carried out for the third time in 1927. The regulations remained more or less the same as in 1926 with minor changes reported for the 1927 World Championship. On October 27, 1926, the AIACR & CSI debated at their Paris meetings the regulations and announced for 1927 that the 1.5-liter formula would remain only until the end of 1927 because of the bad experiences made so far, to be relieved with the free formula for 1928. The minimum weight was increased from 600 to 700 kg. The supercharger was allowed and the two-seat body remained for 1927, though single-seat bodied cars would be allowed as long as the body showed a minimum width of 80 cm to be measured at the seat area for a height of not less than 25 cm. The minimum distance for the great international races was now fixed at 600 km.

== Classification ==
Pos	No	Driver	Car	Laps	Time/Retire
1	6	(France) Robert Benoist	Delage 15 S 8	48	4h45m41.2
2	12	(France) Edmond Bourlier	Delage 15 S 8	48	4h53m55.6
3	18	(France) André Morel	Delage 15 S 8	48	5h11m31.4
4	10	(United Kingdom) "Williams" (France) Jules Moriceau	Talbot 700	48	5h24m30.0
NC	16	(France) Louis Wagner	Talbot 700	42	Engine
NC	2	(United Kingdom) George Eyston	Halford	36	+12 laps
Ret	4	(France) Albert Divo	Talbot 700	23	Supercharger
DNA	8	(France) André Dubonnet	Bugatti 39A		Car not competitive
DNA	14	(Italy) Emilio Materassi	Bugatti 39A		Car not competitive
DNA	20	(France) Jules Goux	Bugatti 39A		Car not competitive
DNA		(Czechoslovakia) Eliška Junková	Bugatti 39A		Did not appear
DNA		(Italy) Conelli	Bugatti 39A		Did not appear
DNP		(France) Jules Moriceau	Talbot 700		Reserve driver
DNP		(France) Robert Senechal	Delage 15 S 8		Reserve driver
DNP		(Italy) Caberto Conelli			Reserve driver

Fastest Lap: Robert Benoist, 5m41.0 (131.96 km/h)

Note - Starting grid based on car number order, positions being drawn. 3x3 formation.

Grand Prix Race
Previous race: 1927 Indianapolis 500	1927 Grand Prix season Grandes Épreuves	Next race: 1927 Spanish Grand Prix
Previous race: 1926 French Grand Prix	French Grand Prix	Next race: 1928 French Grand Prix
