= Rome Grand Prix =

- Vallelunga

Race information
- Number of times held: 40
- First held: 1925
- Last held: 1991
- Most wins (drivers): (Italy) Ernesto Brambilla (2)
- Most wins (constructors): (United Kingdom) March (12)
- Circuit length: 3.222 km (2.002 miles)
- Race length: 193.32 km (120.12 miles)
- Laps: 60

Last race (1991)

Pole position
- (Brazil) Christian Fittipaldi; Reynard-Mugen; 1:03.236

Podium
- 1. (Italy) A. Zanardi; Reynard-Mugen; 1:06:05.152; 2. (Brazil) C. Fittipaldi; Reynard-Mugen; +11.648s; 3. (Italy) A. Tamburini; Reynard-Mugen; +15.724s

Fastest lap
- (Italy) Alessandro Zanardi; Reynard-Mugen; 1:04.939

The Rome Grand Prix (Italian: Gran Premio di Roma), also known as the Premio Reale di Roma (1925–1932) and Gran Premio di Roma (1947–1991), was an automobile race held in Rome, Italy from 1925 until 1991.

Through the years a number of different regulations and circuits were used, with the majority being Formula Two races at the ACI Vallelunga Circuit. In 1954 and 1963 the Rome Grand Prix was run to Formula One rules, but neither event was included in the World Championship.

The 1947 race was notable as it marked the first win for Ferrari with a car of their own construction, the Ferrari 125 S.

In 1985 the European Grand Prix was originally scheduled to take place in the EUR district of Rome as a round of the 1985 Formula 1 World Championship scheduled to take place on 6 October but the race was moved to the UK where it was held at Brands Hatch. But in the late 2000s this was revived, as plans were being made for a Rome Grand Prix to be added to the Formula One World Championship in 2013. A street circuit around the EUR district of Rome was to be the location of the race. However, speculation that the race would threaten the Italian Grand Prix at Monza, as well as a lack of support from local residents, led to the plans being abandoned in early 2011. Since 2018, Formula E has held the Rome ePrix in the area, using some parts of the route proposed for the Formula 1 race.

== Race winners ==
The winners of the Rome Grand Prix from its inception in 1925 are:

Year	Driver	Constructor	Class	Location	Report
1925	(Italy) Carlo Masetti	Bugatti	Formula Libre	Monte Mario	Report
1926	(Italy) Aymo Maggi	Bugatti	Formula Libre	Valle Giulia	Report
1927	(Italy) Tazio Nuvolari	Bugatti	Formula Libre	Parioli	Report
1928	(Monaco) Louis Chiron	Bugatti	Grand Prix	Tre Fontane	Report
1929	(Italy) Achille Varzi	Alfa Romeo	Grand Prix	Tre Fontane	Report
1930	(Italy) Luigi Arcangeli	Maserati	Grand Prix	Tre Fontane	Report
1931	(Italy) Ernesto Maserati	Maserati	Grand Prix	Littorio	Report
1932	(Italy) Luigi Fagioli	Maserati	Grand Prix	Littorio	Report
1933 - 1946	Not held				
1947	(Italy) Franco Cortese	Ferrari	Sports Car	Terme di Caracalla	Report
1948	Not held				
1949	(Italy) Luigi Villoresi	Ferrari	Formula Two	Terme di Caracalla	Report
1950	(Italy) Alberto Ascari	Ferrari	Formula Two	Terme di Caracalla	Report
1951	(Italy) Mario Raffaeli	Ferrari	Formula Two	Terme di Caracalla	Report
1952	Not held				
1953	Not held				
1954	(Argentina) Onofre Marimón	Maserati	Formula One	Castelfusano	Report
1955	Not held				
1956	(France) Jean Behra	Maserati	Sports Car	Castelfusano	Report
1957 - 1962	Not held				
1963	(United Kingdom) Bob Anderson	Lola	Formula One	Vallelunga	Report
1964	(France) Jo Schlesser	Brabham	Formula Two	Vallelunga	Report
1965	(United Kingdom) Richard Attwood	Lola	Formula Two	Vallelunga	Report
1966	(Italy) Ernesto Brambilla	Brabham	Formula Three	Vallelunga	Report
1967	(Belgium) Jacky Ickx	Matra	Formula Two	Vallelunga	Report
1968	(Italy) Ernesto Brambilla	Ferrari	Formula Two	Vallelunga	Report
1969	(France) Johnny Servoz-Gavin	Matra	Formula Two	Vallelunga	Report
1970	Not held				
1971	(Sweden) Ronnie Peterson	March	Formula Two	Vallelunga	Report
1972	Not held				
1973	(France) Jacques Coulon	March	Formula Two	Vallelunga	Report
1974	(France) Patrick Depailler	March	Formula Two	Vallelunga	Report
1975	(Italy) Vittorio Brambilla	March	Formula Two	Vallelunga	Report
1976	(France) Jean-Pierre Jabouille	Elf	Formula Two	Vallelunga	Report
1977	(Italy) Bruno Giacomelli	March	Formula Two	Vallelunga	Report
1978	(Republic of Ireland) Derek Daly	Chevron	Formula Two	Vallelunga	Report
1979	(Switzerland) Marc Surer	March	Formula Two	Vallelunga	Report
1980	(United Kingdom) Brian Henton	Toleman	Formula Two	Vallelunga	Report
1981	(Sweden) Eje Elgh	Maurer	Formula Two	Vallelunga	Report
1982	(Italy) Corrado Fabi	March	Formula Two	Vallelunga	Report
1983	(Italy) Beppe Gabbiani	March	Formula Two	Vallelunga	Report
1984	(New Zealand) Mike Thackwell	Ralt	Formula Two	Vallelunga	Report
1985	(Italy) Emanuele Pirro	March	Formula 3000	Vallelunga	Report
1986	(Italy) Ivan Capelli	March	Formula 3000	Vallelunga	Report
1987	(Italy) Stefano Modena	March	Formula 3000	Vallelunga	Report
1988	(Switzerland) Gregor Foitek	Lola	Formula 3000	Vallelunga	Report
1989	(Italy) Fabrizio Giovanardi	March	Formula 3000	Vallelunga	Report
1990	Not held				
1991	(Italy) Alessandro Zanardi	Reynard	Formula 3000	Vallelunga	Report
