= Edmond Bourlier =

French racing driver (1895–1936)

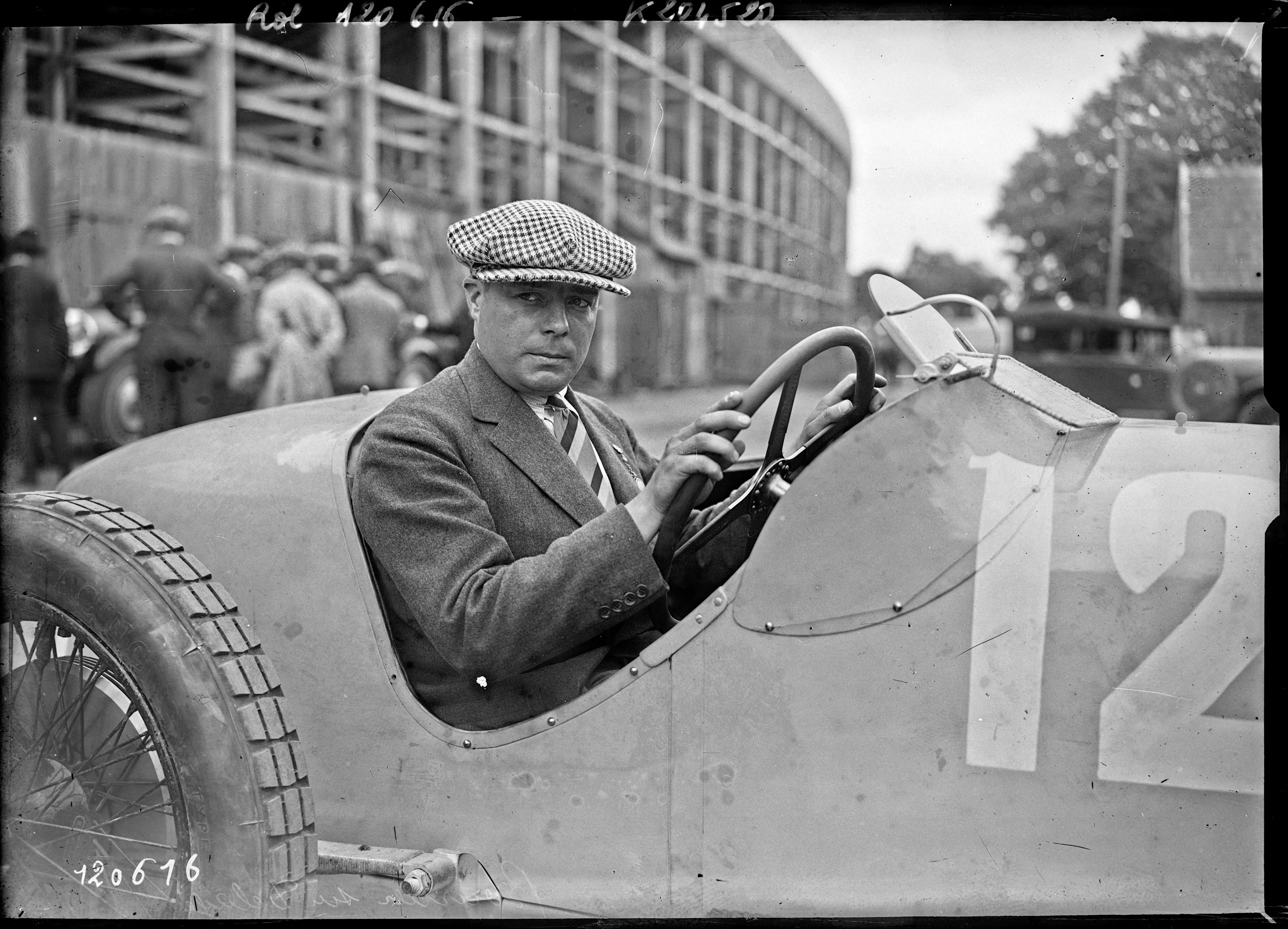
- Bourlier at the 1927 French Grand Prix
- Born: Edmond Jules Bourlier; 5 October 1895 Boulogne-Billancourt, Hauts-de-Seine, France
- Died: 25 March 1936 (aged 40) Puteaux, Hauts-de-Seine

Edmond Bourlier (5 October 1895 – 25 March 1936) was a French racing driver, who took part in Grand Prix motor racing before the Second World War.

== Career ==
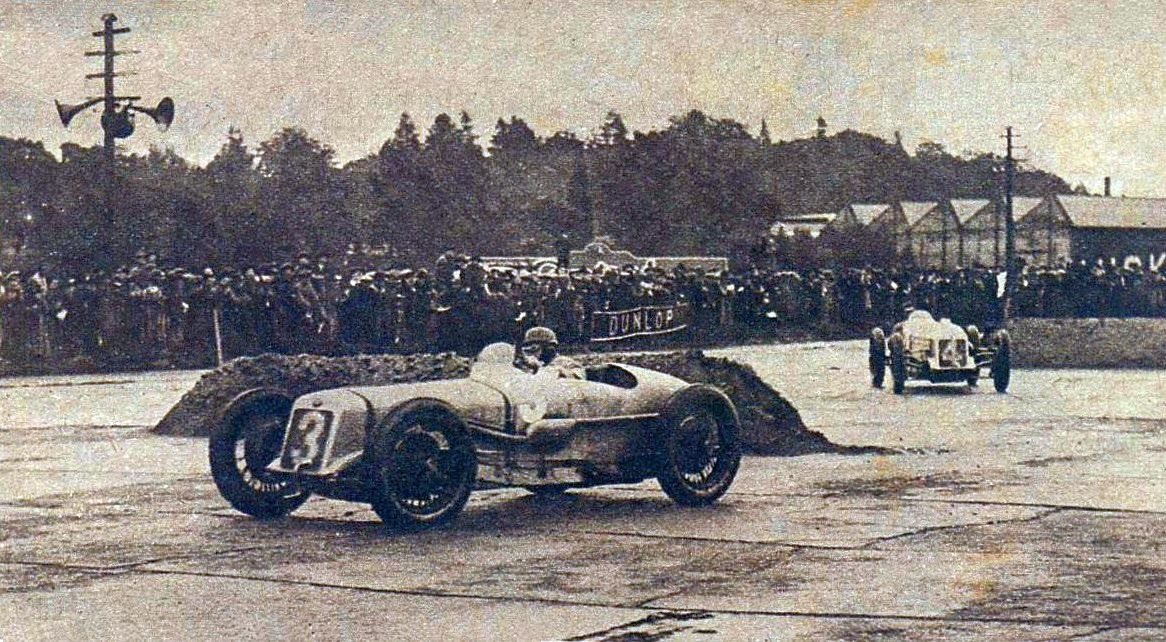
Ahead of team-mate Albert Divo at the 1927 British Grand Prix

Bourlier first came to attention with a victory in the 1,500cc class of the 1924 Toul-Nancy race, only his second-ever race, driving a Talbot entered by the Sunbeam-Talbot-Darracq combine; the modest Bourlier suggested to eager journalists looking for information about "le jeune" that they should interview overall winner Albert Divo instead. In 1925, Bourlier was given a taste of Grand Prix racing by being named as Sunbeam's reserve driver at the French Grand Prix.

He was given a drive for Talbot in the 1926 Grand Prix de Provence "in order to see how they shaped as drivers" - the move backfired slightly as Bourlier's perforance, in winning the 1,500cc heat ahead of Henry Segrave and running up front in the final before retiring, led to his being signed by the Delage Grand Prix team shortly afterwards. He made his Grand Prix debut at the 1926 Grand Prix d'Europe at San Sebastian; struggling with the heat in his Delage, which, owing to a design fault, was burning his feet, Bourlier pulled into the pits for a relief driver, and Robert Sénéchal, present for the touring car support race, volunteered to step in. Sénéchal did so well - helping the duo finish 2nd - that Delage offered him a drive.

The following season, Robert Benoist won all the European events in the 1927 World Manufacturers' Championship, Bourlier following him home at the French Grand Prix and British Grand Prix; the gap at Brooklands was a mere seven seconds.

Bourlier enjoyed success outside Grand Prix racing. He won a number of hillclimb events, including the 1927 La Turbie in a Delage 2LCV, and was one of those who finished the 1933 Tour de France et Belgique rally without penalty, driving a Chenard et Walcker.

On 25 March 1934, Bourlier, who had been suffering from a long-term illness, committed suicide, by taking an overdose of sleeping pills.

== Grand Prix results ==
- 1926 (Delage 15 S 8): 2nd, European Grand Prix
- 1927 (Delage 15 S 8): 2nd, French Grand Prix; 3rd, Spanish Grand Prix; 2nd, British Grand Prix
- 1928 (Bugatti Type 35C): ret, San Sebastián Grand Prix
- 1929 (Bugatti Type 35C): 5th, San Sebastián Grand Prix
- 1931 (Bugatti Type 35C): ret, French Grand Prix

== Le Mans results ==
Year	Team	Co-Drivers	Car	Class	Laps	Pos.	Class Pos.
1925	(France) Talbot	(France) Jules Moriceau	Talbot 2SC	1.5	98	ret	ret
1930	(France) Parke	(France) Philippe de Rothschild	Stutz DV32	8.0	42	ret	ret
