= Itala Special =

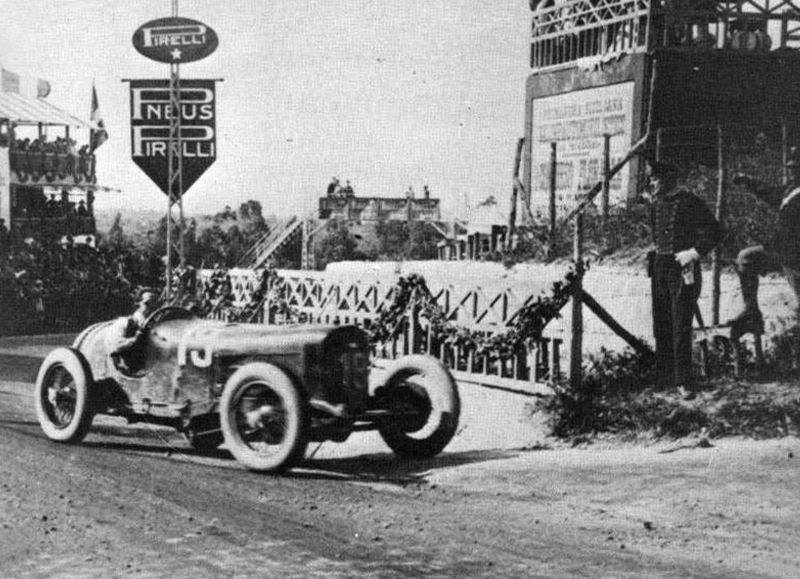

Overview
- Manufacturer: Itala
- Production: 1924–1927

Body and chassis
- Class: Grand Prix
- Layout: FR layout

Powertrain
- Engine: 5.8 L (350 cu in) Hispano-Suiza-derived I4 8-valve SOHC naturally-aspirated
- Transmission: 4-speed manual

Dimensions
- Wheelbase: 2,950–3,250 mm (116–128 in)

The Itala Special was a special custom-built Grand Prix race car, designed, developed, produced, and raced by Emilio Materassi, which competed between 1924 and 1927. It with an Isotta Fraschini chassis and Itala bodywork, and used half of an Hispano-Suiza aircraft engine.
