= George Souders =

American racing driver (1900–1976)

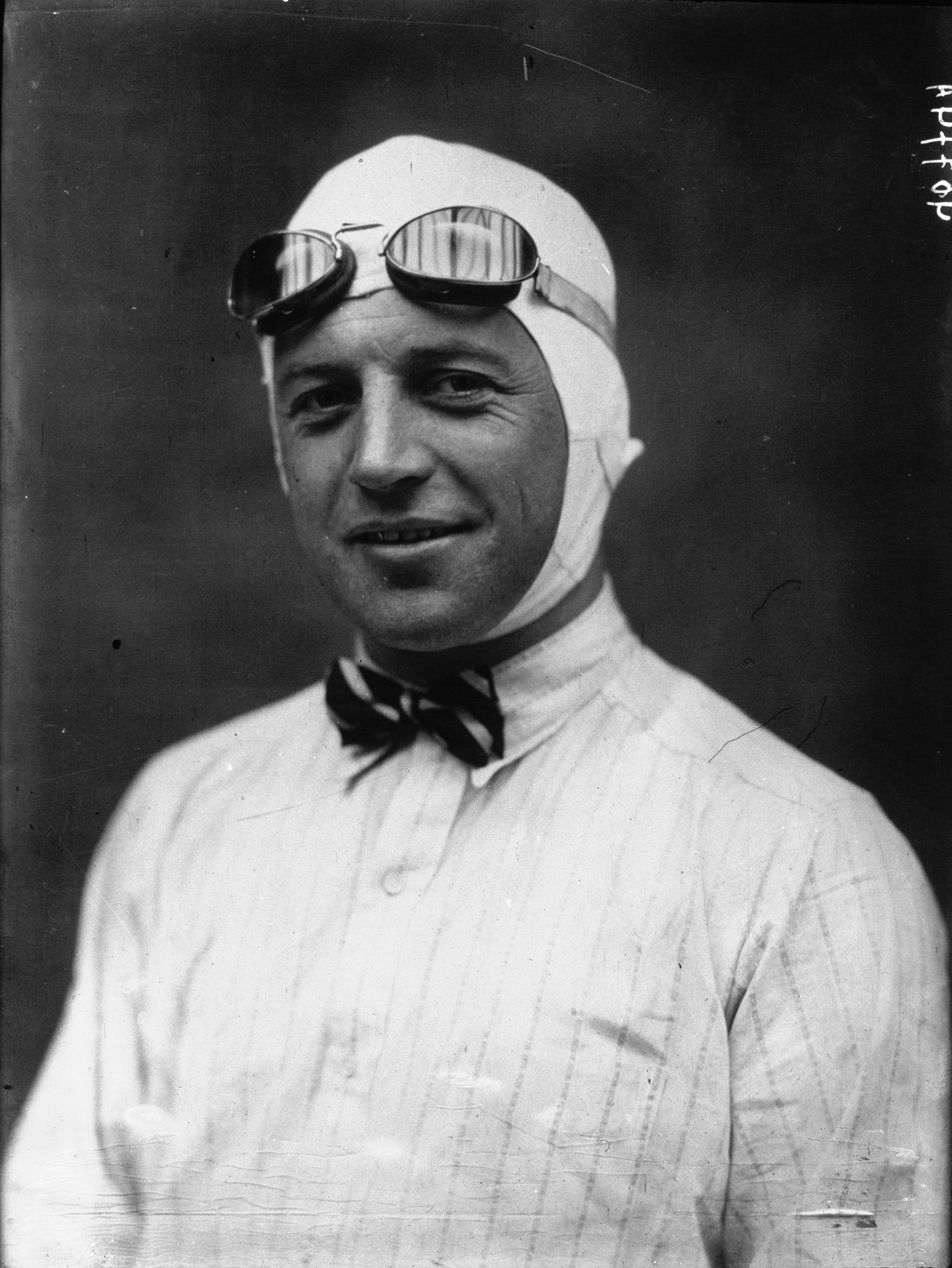
- Souders in 1927
- Born: George Raymond Souders; September 11, 1900 Lafayette, Indiana, U.S.
- Died: July 26, 1976 (aged 75) Indianapolis, Indiana, U.S.

Championship titles
- Major victories Indianapolis 500 (1927)

Champ Car career
- 3 races run over 2 years
- Best finish: 3rd (1927)
- First race: 1927 Indianapolis 500 (Indianapolis)
- Last race: 1928 Detroit 100 (Detroit)
- First win: 1927 Indianapolis 500 (Indianapolis)
Wins	Podiums	Poles
1	2	0

George Raymond Souders (September 11, 1900 – July 26, 1976) was an American racing driver who won the 1927 Indianapolis 500.

Born in Lafayette, Indiana, Souders led the last 51 laps of the 1927 race after starting in 22nd position as a race rookie.

== Early life ==
Souders attended Jefferson High School, in Lafayette, Indiana, graduating in 1918 as class president. He then attended Purdue University, studying mechanical engineering.

== Driving career ==
For a book on the history of the "500," Souders offered a summation of his career:

"I quit Purdue when my father died. I worked in a garage and rode on dirt tracks. That car I rode on 1927, it was smooth handling. And the engine was the smallest to ever win at Indianapolis. The piston displacement was just under 90 (cubic inches). The car was the most expensive the Duesenbergs ever built for racing. It cost around $50,000, I was told. A year later (1928) I finished third at Indianapolis. In the summer of '28 I raced in Detroit--a $1000 race, nothing much, and was guaranteed $750 just for showing up--but...you want to win. Anyway, I had an awful spill. I was unconscious six months and never raced after that."

== Death ==
Souders died in Indianapolis, Indiana on July 26, 1976.

== Motorsports career results ==
=== Indianapolis 500 results ===
Year	Car	Start	Qual	Rank	Finish	Laps	Led	Retired
1927	32	22	111.551	12	1	200	51	Running
1928	3	12	111.444	16	3	200	16	Running
Totals						400	67	

Starts	2
Poles	0
Front Row	0
Wins	1
Top 5	2
Top 10	2
Retired	0

Preceded by Frank Lockhart	Indianapolis 500 Winner; 1927	Succeeded by Louis Meyer
