= Aymo Maggi =

Italian racing driver (1903–1961)

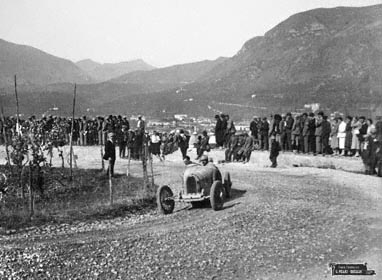
- Nationality: Italy
- Born: 30 July 1903 Brescia
- Died: 23 October 1961 (aged 58)

Aymo Maggi (30 July 1903 – 23 October 1961) was an Italian racing car driver from Brescia and co-organiser of the first Mille Miglia automobile race in 1927. He was an active member of the Fascist Party since 1921, participating and leading the local fascist militia. He was also secretary for many years of the local Fascist Party.

== History ==
Aymo Maggi was born to Berardo Tommaso Francesco Maggi, count of Gradella, and his wife, countess Anna Vignati, in the Maggi family palazzo at Via Musei on 30 July 1903 in Brescia, Italy, the son and heir of a dynasty which would be traced back to the beginning of the 13th century. His younger brother, Camillo Maggi, was born a year later in 1904, but died from tuberculosis at the age of 18 in 1922.

Among his ancestors were Emanuele Maggi, who became the mayor of Brescia in 1243; Berardo Maggi, who became the bishop and prince of Brescia from 1274 to 1308; Sebastian Maggi, who became vicar-general for the province of Lombardy in 1441, and was beatified by Pope Clement XIII in 1760; and Onofrio Maggi and Jerome Maggi, who received the title of "Count of Gradella" from King Charles II of Spain (1661–1700), who had jurisdiction over the Duchy of Milan (1450–1796).

From an early age, Aymo Maggi was trained in hunting, shooting and equestrian sports by his father, who was an avid horseman. When only 10-and-a-half months old, Maggi was placed on horseback for the first time as an infant; by the time he was 3 years old, he was practising show jumping on his pet donkey over obstacles set on the Maggi estate grounds. The Maggi estates were also filled with horses and four-in-hand horse carriages, which Maggi's father drove all over continental Europe. However, Maggi himself was more interested in the latest automobiles driven by his father and the family's wealthy friends, and was taught how to drive by his family's chauffeur.

Maggi also grew up alongside the future Count Franco Mazzotti, the son of a wealthy banker from Milan, Italy, who had a summer estate at Chiari, Lombardy, and the two were childhood friends. By the age of 12 in 1915, the two boys were obsessed with cars, speed, and automobile racing. The two also became skilled mechanics and engineers through joint projects working on motorcycles, cars, and early airplanes and airships. Maggi was also trained as an airplane pilot, and achieved a pilot's license, which gained him the nickname of Il Pilote Gente. However, unlike Mazzotti, Maggi preferred driving and automobile racing to aviation.

After World War I (1914–1918), the Maggi family relocated to Rome. There, Maggi attended the Military College (or Academy) as a cavalry cadet until 1919, when the family returned to Brescia. While not enthusiastic about horses or horseback riding, Maggi was still a very competent rider, and won a bet placed by his friends at the Academy for breaking in a "particularly fiery black stallion, which did its best to throw him across the cobbled yard".

From 1921 to 1922, Maggi completed his required year of compulsory military service in an Italian cavalry regiment. Maggi started competing in automobile racing in 1922, and had his first important victory in his hometown 1924 race between Gargnano-Tignale. He won at the Circuito del Garda in 1925 and 1926, as well as the Rome Grand Prix in 1926. Maggi drove in a Bugatti Type 35 and Bugatti Type 36 alongside Ettore Bugatti and Bartolomeo Costantini.

With Mazzotti and two others, he was the organiser of the first Mille Miglia in 1927, as Brescia in 1921 had lost the role of hosting the Italian Grand Prix to Milan and the Autodromo Nazionale Monza. In this race, he won 6th place driving an Isotta Fraschini 8A SS in 1927 with Bindo Maserati.

When Italy entered World War II on the side of the Axis powers in 1940, Maggi joined the Regiment "Savoia Cavalleria" (3rd) as a captain. He served in the mountains north of Turin, and later defended the strategically important town of Gaeta. However, shortly after being stationed at Gaeta, Maggi experienced severe stomach pains and was diagnosed with acute ulcers in his lower intestine. He was medically discharged in 1941 and eventually recovered. Mazzotti would be killed in action while serving as a pilot and commanding officer of a special combat group in the Italian Air Force in the winter of 1941, aged 38.

Maggi was also close friends with Scuderia Ferrari and Ferrari founder Enzo Ferrari, and Ferrari viewed Maggi's Mille Miglia fondly, even years after the race was discontinued after the disastrous 1957 Mille Miglia. Ferrari called Maggi the "father of the Mille Miglia...who created the finest motor race in the world", and penned a memoir about Maggi for Peter Miller's book Conte Maggi's Mille Miglia shortly before his death in 1988.

Maggi survived his first heart attack in 1959, but died from his second in 1961.

== Personal life ==
On 23 April 1931, Maggi married the 21-year-old nobile Camilla Martinoni Caleppio (b. 1910), whose father had been one of the early motoring pioneers in Brescia in the early 1900s. The wedding was attended only by relatives and close friends, including both Mazzotti and Arturo Ferrarin, aviator of the Rome-to-Tokyo record flight and of Schneider Cup fame. The couple resided at the Maggi family estates in Gradella and Calino in Lombardy, and had no known children.

Maggi's mother died in 1928, and his father died in 1929, at which time the 25-year-old Aymo inherited the title of "Count of Gradella" and the Maggi family estates. The Maggis loved to travel throughout Europe and Africa, and would do so throughout their lifetimes. The couple also enjoyed sailing, swimming, water skiing, shooting, hunting and tennis.

The Maggis made anonymous grants to many churches, youth centres, playing fields and schools over the years, and Maggi loved encouraging sports with local children.

Ten years after Maggi's death, his widow went into business as a wine producer. In 1982, she sold all her properties in Gradella (including Villa Maggi), thus ending the 700-year presence in the village of the Maggi family. Countess Maggi died in 2004 at the age of 94.
