= André Dubonnet =

French flying ace and athlete (1897–1980)

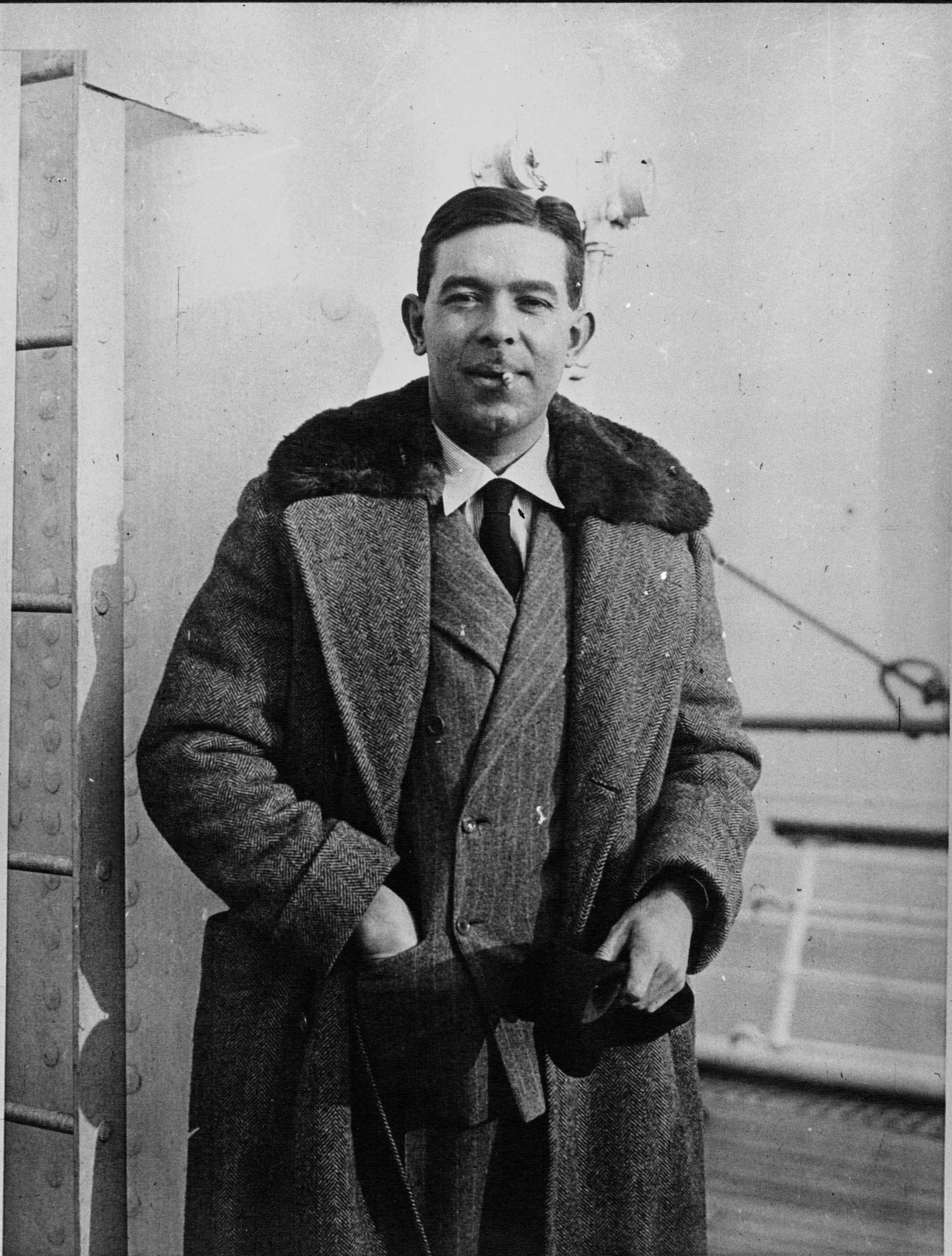
- Dubonnet in 1933
- Born: 28 June 1897; Paris, France
- Died: 20 January 1980 (aged 82)
- Military career
- Allegiance: France
- Branch: Aviation
- Rank: Sergent
- Unit: Escadrille 3
- Awards: Légion d'honneur, Médaille militaire, Croix de Guerre

André Dubonnet (28 June 1897 – 20 January 1980) was a French flying ace, athlete, race car driver, and inventor. He was the grandson of Joseph Dubonnet, founder of the Dubonnet apéritif firm, from which he inherited substantial wealth.

== Early life and military service ==
Dubonnet was born in Paris on 28 June 1897. He began his military service as an artilleryman, but switched to aviation.

He was credited with six aerial victories as a pilot during World War I. Flying a SPAD XIII, he shared two out of his three May 1918 victories with Frank Baylies, teamed up with Fernand Henri Chavannes to destroy an observation balloon on 13 June, and split a pair of wins on 16 August 1918 with Joseph de Sevin and Captain Battle.

== Between the world wars ==
In December 1922, Dubonnet married Claude Sampieri, daughter of Count Charles Sampieri and of Irène Cahen d'Anvers, whose father was the banker Louis Cahen d'Anvers. Together, they had two daughters, France and Lorraine.

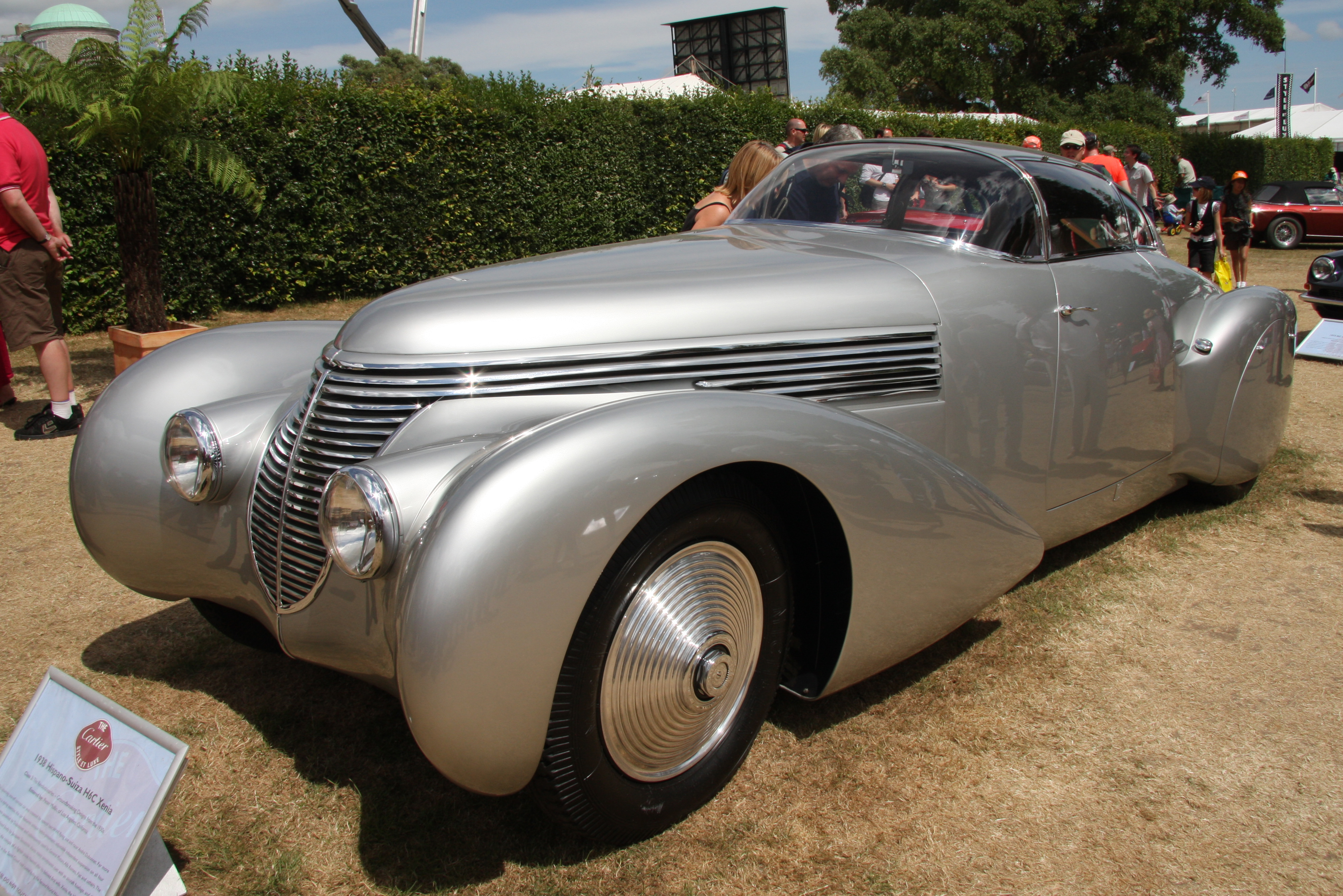
Dubonnet commissioned several unique cars to be built, such as this 1938 Hispano-Suiza H6B Dubonnet Xenia, named after his first wife

During the 1920s, Dubonnet competed in Olympic bobsledding, as well as racing cars for Bugatti and Hispano-Suiza. He later spent much of his fortune developing inventions. He successfully sold an automobile suspension system (système Dubonnet) to General Motors, but nearly went bankrupt late in life while working on solar energy. He also developed several aerodynamic studies and commissioned some special aerodynamic cars to be built for him.

In 1932, Dubonnet married Xenia Howard-Johnston, who died not long afterward. He met his third wife, the American Ruth Obre, during his dealings with GM's Alfred P. Sloan, who was famed for his visions of the automaker's incremental product levels and planned obsolescence.

Dubonnet became a Chevalier of the Légion d'honneur in January 1936.

== World War II and beyond ==
He returned to service during World War II, serving in GCI/2.

André Dubonnet died on 20 January 1980 in Paris.
