= Caberto Conelli =

Italian racing driver (1889–1974)

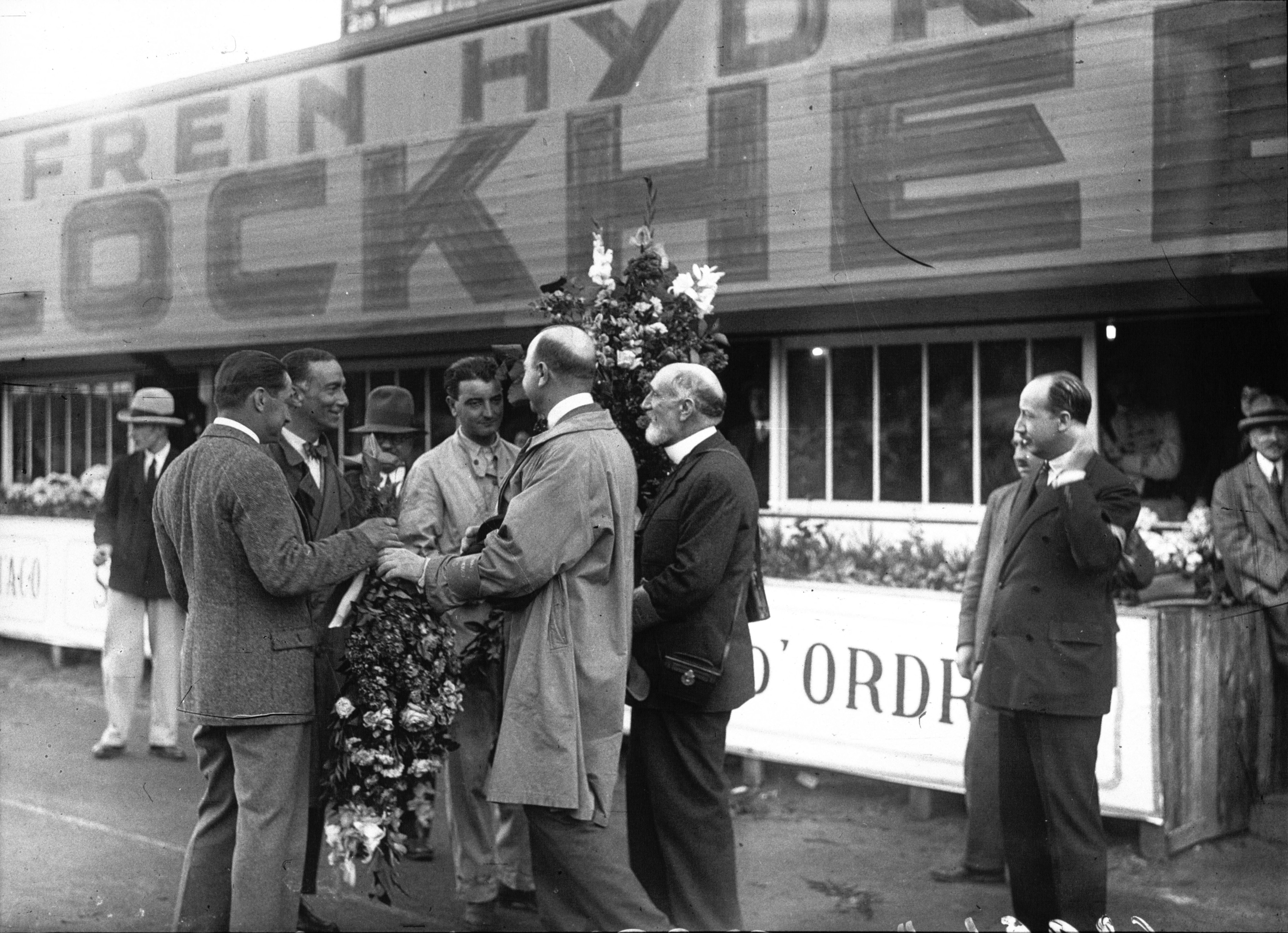
Conelli at the 1929 French Grand Prix

Carlo Alberto Conelli, count de Prosperi, best known as Caberto Conelli (Born in Belgirate, Piedmont 28 August 1889 – 25 August 1974) was a sometime Italian racecar driver.

== Career ==
Conelli first raced for Bugatti in 1920 and his greatest achievement was winning 1931 Belgian Grand Prix with William Grover-Williams under the 10-hour European Championship formula, the duo keeping a careful pace for the first half of the race, but speeding up in the second half to beat the Alfa Romeo of Tazio Nuvolari and Baconin Borzacchini by nearly a lap.

He died at 84 years old.
