= Frank Lockhart (racing driver) =

American racing driver (1903–1928)

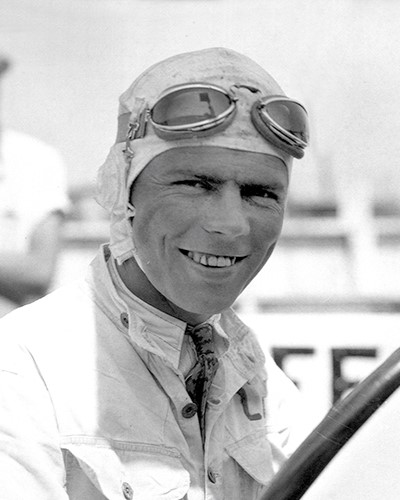
- Lockhart in 1927
- Born: Frank Stallworth Lockhart; March 5, 1903 or March 8, 1903 Dayton, Ohio, U.S.
- Died: April 25, 1928 (aged 25) Daytona Beach, Florida, U.S.

Championship titles
- Major victories Indianapolis 500 (1926)

Champ Car career
- 24 races run over 2 years
- Best finish: 2nd (1926, 1927)
- First race: 1926 Indianapolis 500 (Indianapolis)
- Last race: 1927 75-mile Race (Rockingham Park)
- First win: 1926 Indianapolis 500 (Indianapolis)
- Last win: 1927 75-mile Race (Rockingham Park)
Wins	Podiums	Poles
9	13	7

Frank Stallworth Lockhart (March 5, 1903 or March 8, 1903 – April 25, 1928) was an American racing driver active in the 1920s, considered by many historians to be a legend in the sport on par with Jim Clark, 1960s British World Drivers' Champion. During a "remarkable if all too short" career, Lockhart won numerous races on both dirt and board tracks, and the 1926 Indianapolis 500. In all, he scored nine AAA championship race wins and two vice-championships in two years of competition. Having set a world land speed record at the Muroc dry lake in April 1927, Lockhart was killed during another speed record attempt at Daytona Beach a year later.

== Driving career ==
Lockhart was raised in Southern California. He had a strong engineering and motor building ability that he used to build custom cars throughout his career.

Lockhart began his career in Frontenac-prepared Fords (Fronty Fords) at dirt track events, where he showed remarkable speed against the dominating Duesenbergs and Millers for two seasons.

=== 1926 ===
Lockhart's big break came when he was signed as a relief driver for Pete Kreis's eight-cylinder supercharged Miller at the 1926 Indianapolis 500. He convinced Kreis to allow him to take some "warm up" laps, and he clocked quicker times than Kreis (120.919 mph (194.600 km/h)). He set a new unofficial track record on his first official qualifying lap (a three-lap average was used to set a track record). He cut down a tire and crashed on the second qualifying lap. He also had mechanical problems on his second attempt. He slowed down on his third and final attempt, and qualified 20th overall with a speed of 95.780 mph (154.143 km/h). On race day, he moved from 20th to fifth by Lap 5, having passed 14 cars on that lap alone. He moved up to second on Lap 16. Lockhart took the lead from Dave Lewis shortly after a rain delay on Lap 72. Lewis and Lockhart battled for the lead for the next 20 laps, until Lewis dropped out. Lockhart nearly stretched out a two-lap lead before rain ended the race on Lap 160, becoming the fourth rookie to win the Indianapolis 500.

Lockhart bought the car. He later bought a second Miller car, and he set track records almost everywhere he went. He won four more AAA championship races in 1926, and finished second in the standings.

=== 1927 ===
Lockhart's car was the first car equipped with an intercooler. The intercooler added 8 mph (13 km/h) to his speed at his first race at Culver City in March with Lockhart finishing fourth after starting from the pole position.

Lockhart qualified on the pole for the 1927 Indianapolis 500 in his Perfect Circle Miller. He led the opening 81 laps, and a full 107 before his car broke a connecting rod, setting an opening lap-leader record that stood for 64 years. He won four AAA championship races in 1927, and repeated the vice-championship.

=== Championship car career summary ===
In his racing career, Lockhart set the all-time qualifying speed record at the Atlantic City Speedway, a record first exceeded at Indianapolis in 1960.

Lockhart competed in 22 board track races in his career, with eight wins and fourteen top-five finishes, and is 25th on the all-time lap leader board at Indianapolis.

== Land speed record and death ==
On April 11, 1927, Lockhart took one of his tiny 91 cubic inch (1491 cc) supercharged, intercooled Millers out at the Muroc dry lake and set a land speed record of 160.01 mph (257.51 km/h) for a two-way average in the mile (1.6 km), with a peak speed of 171 mph (275 km/h).

Backed by Stutz Motor Company, Lockhart combined two supercharged 91 ci (1.5 L) DOHC Miller motors, producing about 380 hp (280 kW), the smallest-displacement car ever to make the attempt, to set a new land speed record in the 122–183 cubic inch (2–3 litre) class at Daytona Beach. On April 25, 1928, Lockhart's Stutz Black Hawk Special streamliner (named for the Indiana town that was home to Stutz's factory) turned a warmup run of 198.29 mph (319.12 km/h), with his first official pass at 203.45 mph (327.42 km/h), well below the 207.552 mph (334.023 km/h) mark set earlier in the year by Ray Keech in his 81-litre (4178 ci) Triplex Special. On Lockhart's return pass the Black Hawk Special right rear tire exploded due to a blister which had formed during his first pass at speed, went out of control and tumbled violently across the sand, throwing Lockhart from the car and killing him instantly.

== Awards and honors ==
Lockhart has been inducted into the following halls of fame:

- Auto Racing Hall of Fame (1965)
- National Sprint Car Hall of Fame (1990)
- Motorsports Hall of Fame of America (1999)

== Motorsports career results ==
=== Indianapolis 500 results ===
Year	Car	Start	Qual	Rank	Finish	Laps	Led	Retired
1926	15	20	95.780	19	1	160	95	Running
1927	2	1	120.100	1	18	120	110	Rod
Totals						280	205	

Starts	2
Poles	1
Front Row	1
Wins	1
Top 5	1
Top 10	1
Retired	1

Preceded by Peter DePaolo	Indianapolis 500 Winner; 1926	Succeeded by George Souders
