= 1926 AAA Championship Car season =

Auto racing season

- AAA National Championship Trail

Season
- Races: 26
- Start date: February 22
- End date: November 11

Awards
- National champion: (United States) Harry Hartz
- Indianapolis 500 winner: (United States) Frank Lockhart

The 1926 AAA Championship Car season consisted of 24 races, beginning in Miami Beach, Florida on February 22 and concluding in Pineville, North Carolina on November 11. There were also 7 non-championship races. The AAA National Champion was Harry Hartz and the Indianapolis 500 winner was Frank Lockhart.

The season suffered two fatalities. Herbert Jones died at Indianapolis during a practice session. Jack Foley died at Salem during qualifying for the second race.

== Schedule and results ==
All races running on Dirt/Brick/Board Oval.

Rnd	Date	Race name	Track	Location	Type	Pole position	Winning driver
1	February 22	(United States) Carl G. Fisher Trophy - 300	Fulford–Miami Speedway	Miami Beach, Florida	Board	(United States) Ralph Hepburn	(United States) Peter DePaolo
2	March 21	(United States) Culver City Race - 250	Culver City Speedway	Culver City, California	Board	(United States) Bob McDonogh	(United States) Bennett Hill
NC	April 15	(United States) Raisin Day Classic - 50	Fresno Speedway	Fresno, California	Board	—	(United States) Peter DePaolo
3	May 1	(United States) Atlantic City Race - 300	Atlantic City Speedway	Hammonton, New Jersey	Board	(United States) Bob McDonogh	(United States) Harry Hartz
4	May 10	(United States) Charlotte Race - 250	Charlotte Speedway	Pineville, North Carolina	Board	(United States) Harry Hartz	(United States) Earl Devore
5	May 31	(United States) International 500 Mile Sweepstakes^{A}	Indianapolis Motor Speedway	Speedway, Indiana	Brick	(United States) Earl Cooper	(United States) Frank Lockhart
6	June 12	(United States) Altoona Race 1 - 250	Altoona Speedway	Tyrone, Pennsylvania	Board	(United States) Peter DePaolo	(United States) Dave Lewis
NC	June 27	(United States) Detroit Race 1 - 100	Michigan State Fairgrounds	Detroit, Michigan	Dirt	—	(United States) Frank Lockhart
7	July 5	(United States) Independence Day Classic Semi - 50	Rockingham Park	Salem, New Hampshire	Board	(United States) Peter DePaolo	(United States) Peter DePaolo
8	July 5	(United States) Independence Day Classic Main - 200	Rockingham Park	Salem, New Hampshire	Board	(United States) Peter DePaolo	(United States) Earl Cooper
9	July 17	(United States) Sesquicentennial Classic Heat 1 - 60	Atlantic City Speedway	Hammonton, New Jersey	Board	—	(United States) Harry Hartz
10	July 17	(United States) Sesquicentennial Classic Heat 2 - 60	Atlantic City Speedway	Hammonton, New Jersey	Board	—	(United States) Norman Batten
11	July 17	(United States) Sesquicentennial Classic Semi - 60	Atlantic City Speedway	Hammonton, New Jersey	Board	—	(United States) Fred Comer
12	July 17	(United States) Sesquicentennial Classic Main - 60	Atlantic City Speedway	Hammonton, New Jersey	Board	—	(United States) Harry Hartz
13	August 23	(United States) Charlotte Heat 1 - 25	Charlotte Speedway	Pineville, North Carolina	Board	(United States) Bob McDonogh	(United States) Earl Cooper
14	August 23	(United States) Charlotte Heat 2 - 25	Charlotte Speedway	Pineville, North Carolina	Board	—	(United States) Dave Lewis
15	August 23	(United States) Charlotte Semi - 50	Charlotte Speedway	Pineville, North Carolina	Board	—	(United States) Frank Lockhart
16	August 23	(United States) Charlotte Main - 150	Charlotte Speedway	Pineville, North Carolina	Board	(United States) Dave Lewis	(United States) Frank Lockhart
NC	September 4	(United States) Syracuse - 50	New York State Fairgrounds	Syracuse, New York	Dirt	—	(United States) Ralph DePalma
NC	September 11	(United States) Detroit Race 2 - 100	Michigan State Fairgrounds	Detroit, Michigan	Dirt	—	(United States) Frank Lockhart
17	September 18	(United States) Altoona Race 2 - 250	Altoona Speedway	Tyrone, Pennsylvania	Board	(United States) Harry Hartz	(United States) Frank Lockhart
NC	October 2	(United States) Fresno Heat 1 - 25^{B}	Fresno Speedway	Fresno, California	Board	—	(United States) Peter DePaolo
18	October 2	(United States) Fresno Heat 2 - 25	Fresno Speedway	Fresno, California	Board	—	(United States) Bennett Hill
19	October 2	(United States) Fresno Race - 50	Fresno Speedway	Fresno, California	Board	—	(United States) Frank Lockhart
20	October 12	(United States) Rockingham Race 1 - 25	Rockingham Park	Salem, New Hampshire	Board	—	(United States) Bennett Hill
21	October 12	(United States) Rockingham Race 2 - 25	Rockingham Park	Salem, New Hampshire	Board	—	(United States) Leon Duray
22	October 12	(United States) Rockingham Race 3 - 200	Rockingham Park	Salem, New Hampshire	Board	—	(United States) Harry Hartz
NC	October 24	(United States) Detroit Race 3 - 100	Michigan State Fairgrounds	Detroit, Michigan	Dirt	—	(United States) Sam Ross
23	November 11	(United States) Charlotte Heat 1 - 25	Charlotte Speedway	Pineville, North Carolina	Board	(United States) Bennett Hill	(United States) Frank Lockhart
24	November 11	(United States) Charlotte Heat 2 - 25	Charlotte Speedway	Pineville, North Carolina	Board	(United States) Harry Hartz	(United States) Dave Lewis
25	November 11	(United States) Charlotte Semi - 50	Charlotte Speedway	Pineville, North Carolina	Board	(United States) Bennett Hill	(United States) Harry Hartz
26	November 11	(United States) Charlotte Main - 100	Charlotte Speedway	Pineville, North Carolina	Board	(United States) Frank Lockhart	(United States) Leon Duray

Non-championship race
- Indianapolis 500 was AAA-sanctioned and counted towards the 1926 AIACR World Manufacturers' Championship title.

^A Scheduled for 500 miles, stopped due to rain on the lap 160.
^B The IZOD IndyCar Series 2011 Historical Record Book listed the all time race winners. On the page 77 counted only two of the three October 2, 1926 Fresno races, what won by Bennett Hill and Frank Lockhart.

== Final points standings ==
Note: Drivers had to be running at the finish to score points. Points scored by drivers sharing a ride were split according to percentage of race driven. Starters were not able to score points as relief drivers, if a race starter finished the race in another car, in a points scoring position, those points were awarded to the driver who had started the car.
The final standings based on reference.

Pos	Driver	MIA (United States)	CUL (United States)	ATL1 (United States)	CHA1 (United States)	INDY (United States)	ALT1 (United States)	SAL1 (United States)	SAL2 (United States)	ATL2 (United States)	ATL3 (United States)	ATL4 (United States)	ATL5 (United States)	CHA2 (United States)	CHA3 (United States)	CHA4 (United States)	CHA5 (United States)	ALT2 (United States)	FRE1 (United States)	FRE2 (United States)	SAL3 (United States)	SAL4 (United States)	SAL5 (United States)	CHA6 (United States)	CHA7 (United States)	CHA8 (United States)	CHA9 (United States)	Pts
1	(United States) Harry Hartz	2	3	1	**2**	2	11	2	4	1			1		3	2		**4**			2	2	1*		**2***	1	4	2954
2	(United States) Frank Lockhart RY					1*	DNS		DSQ	4			10	2		1*	1*	1	2	1	3	3	9	1*		12	**7**	1830
3	(United States) Peter DePaolo	1	2	2	14	5	**8**	**1**	**3**		4			6				DNP	4	4	7	9	16		5	5	6	1500
4	(United States) Bennett Hill	5	1*	10	11	12	6		2	2			11		2		6	7	1	2	1	5	8	**2**		4	DNS	1050
5	(United States) Frank Elliott	4	5	16	5	6	7*	4	5		2		8	4		4	2	8			14	12	5	3		6	2	747
6	(United States) Fred Comer	14	14	7	3	4	4		4		9	1	2	7				6			12	11	13		4	11	5	659
7	(United States) Dave Lewis	17	13			15	1		14	7					1	DNQ	**7**	14	3	3	5	4	14		1	3	8	645
8	(United States) Norman Batten		8	14	4	7	2		6		1		3	5		7	8	18			18	8	15					620
9	(United States) Pete Kreis	11	11	4	7	DNS	DNS										DNS	2			13	10	2	5		8		590
10	(United States) Earl Devore	6	15	11	1	DNP	15	8	DNQ		5				6		4	11			17		17					585
11	(United States) Leon Duray	10*	10			23	DNS		DNQ								DNS	3			11	1*	3	6		2	1	555
12	(United States) Earl Cooper	18				**16**	13	6	1		6	5	12	1		9		16									DNQ	465
13	(United States) Bob McDonogh	3	**12**	**3***	12	8	9		10	11				**3**		6		5			15						DNP	416
14	(United States) Cliff Woodbury R		9	13	10	3	12		DNQ	9		3	5		5*	3	9	17			4	6	12		3			360
15	(United States) Eddie Hearne		4	6	15	17	5		15	3					7		3	9										305
16	(United States) W. E. Shattuc	8	16	9	8	27	DNS	5	8	8		2	13		4	5	5	10			10		6	4		7	3	280
17	(Canada) John Duff R					9	3		13				Wth															155
18	(United States) Ralph Hepburn	**16**	6	5	16	8	9	3	DNQ		7	6					DNS	DNQ			6	13	11		6	9	9	144
19	(United States) Dave Evans	9	7	8	13		DNS		16	6			7				10	DNQ			9	7	4					120
20	(United States) Ben Jones R	7		12	9	18	10		11		3		9			8	11											80
21	(United States) Phil Shafer					10	DNS	7	9	5			4				DNS	DNP										72
22	(United States) Wade Morton					4			7												9		10					67
23	(United States) Harlan Fengler					DNP	14		12		8	4	6	8				12										45
24	(United States) Zeke Meyer R	13		DNQ	6																							35
25	(United States) Tony Gulotta R					11	DNS											15			16		7				DNP	15
-	(United States) Daniel O'Brien R					DNP	17		17		10						Wth											0
-	(United Kingdom) Ernest Eldridge R					19	DNS		DNQ	10																		0
-	(United States) Louis Meyer R																									10		0
-	(United States) Jerry Wunderlich	12	14																									0
-	(United States) Thane Houser					13			18																			0
-	(United States) Fred Lecklider R					24												13										0
-	(United Kingdom) Douglas Hawkes					14	DNS		DNQ				DNQ															0
-	(United States) Tommy Milton	15																										0
-	(Russia) Vladimir Rashevskiy R			15																								0
-	(United Kingdom) Jack Foley R					DNQ	16		DNQ																			0
-	(United States) Cliff Durant					17																						0
-	(United States) Herschell McKee R					19																						0
-	(United States) L. L. Corum					20																						0
-	(United States) Steve Nemesh R					21																						0
-	(United States) Jules Ellingboe					22																						0
-	(United States) Jack McCarver R					25																						0
-	(Canada) Bon MacDougall R					26																						0
-	(France) Albert Guyot					28																						0
-	(United Kingdom) Thomas Pickard					DNQ			DNQ				DNQ					DNQ										0
-	(United States) Ralph DePalma			DNQ		DNQ																						0
-	(United States) Frank Farmer			DNQ																								0
-	(France) Jean de Marguenat			DNQ																								0
-	(United States) Dan Cain					DNQ																						0
-	(United States) Herbert Jones					DNQ																						0
-	(United States) Ralph Mulford					DNQ																						0
-	(United States) Charles Shambaugh					DNQ																						0
Pos	Driver	MIA (United States)	CUL (United States)	ATL1 (United States)	CHA1 (United States)	INDY (United States)	ALT1 (United States)	SAL1 (United States)	SAL2 (United States)	ATL2 (United States)	ATL3 (United States)	ATL4 (United States)	ATL5 (United States)	CHA2 (United States)	CHA3 (United States)	CHA4 (United States)	CHA5 (United States)	ALT2 (United States)	FRE1 (United States)	FRE2 (United States)	SAL3 (United States)	SAL4 (United States)	SAL5 (United States)	CHA6 (United States)	CHA7 (United States)	CHA8 (United States)	CHA9 (United States)	Pts

Color	Result
Gold	Winner
Silver	2nd place
Bronze	3rd place
Green	4th & 5th place
Light Blue	6th-10th place
Dark Blue	Finished (Outside Top 10)
Purple	Did not finish (Ret)
Red	Did not qualify (DNQ)
Brown	Withdrawn (Wth)
Black	Disqualified (DSQ)
White	Did not start (DNS)
Blank	Did not participate (DNP)
Blank	Not competing

**In-line notation**
**Bold**	Pole position
Italics	Ran fastest race lap
*	Led most race laps
Rookie of the Year
Rookie

== See also ==
- 1926 Indianapolis 500
