= 1903 in motorsport =

The following is an overview of the events of 1903 in motorsport including the major racing events, motorsport venues that were opened and closed during a year, championships and non-championship events that were established and disestablished in a year, and births and deaths of racing drivers and other motorsport people.

== Births ==
Date	Month	Name	Nationality	Occupation	Note	Ref
8	April	Frank Lockhart	American	Racing driver	Indianapolis 500 winner (1926).	
23	May	Ernst Klodwig	German	Racing driver	The first East German Formula One driver.	
9	June	Felice Bonetto	Italian	Racing driver	1952 Targa Florio winner.	
1	October	Pierre Veyron	French	Racing driver	24 Hours of Le Mans winner (1939).	
23	November	Juan Jover	Spanish	Racing driver	The first Spanish Formula One driver.	
5	December	Kelly Petillo	American	Racing driver	Indianapolis 500 winner (1935).	
