= Ben Jones (racing driver) =

American racing driver (1903–1938)

- Born: Benjamin Lafayette Jones IV; April 2, 1903 Schlater, Mississippi, U.S.
- Died: December 23, 1938 (aged 35) near Uniontown, Alabama, U.S.

Champ Car career
- 10 races run over 2 years
- Best finish: 20th (1926)
- First race: 1926 Carl G. Fisher Trophy (Fulford)
- Last race: 1926 Charlotte 150 (Charlotte)
Wins	Podiums	Poles
0	1	0

Benjamin Lafayette Jones IV (April 2, 1903 – December 23, 1938) was an American racing driver.

== Motorsports career results ==
=== AAA Championship car results ===
Season	Class	Team	Race	Win	Podium	Pole	FLap	Pts	Plcd
1926	AAA National Championship	Duesenberg	10	0	1	0	0	80	20th

=== Indianapolis 500 results ===
Year	Car	Start	Qual	Rank	Finish	Laps	Led	Retired
1926	29	18	92.142	24	18	54	0	Crash

Starts	1
Poles	0
Front Row	0
Wins	0
Top 5	0
Top 10	0
Retired	1
