= Earl Devore =

American racing driver (1889–1928)

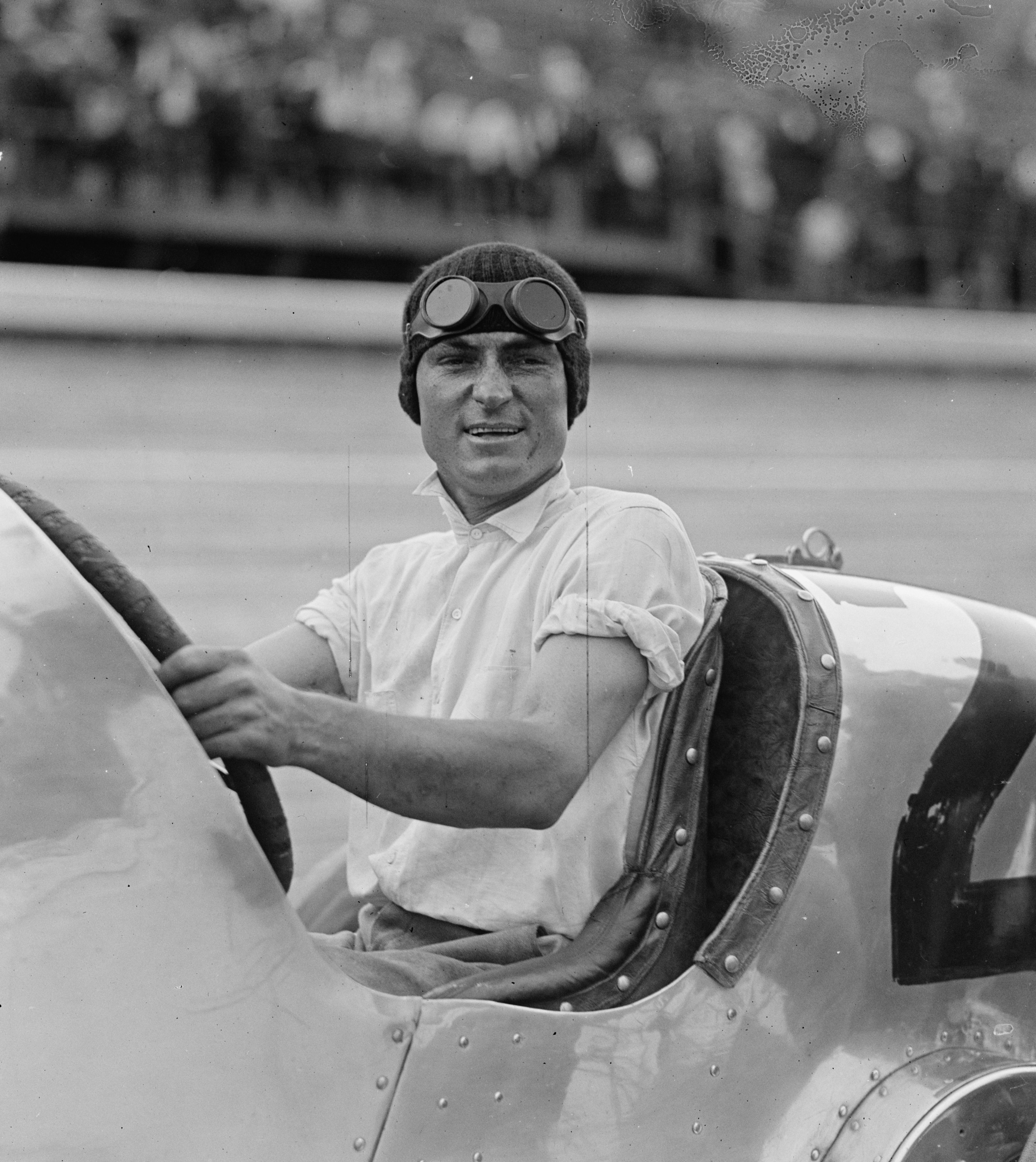
- DeVore, circa 1925
- Born: Francis Earl Devore; December 2, 1889 Macksville, Kansas, U.S.
- Died: November 12, 1928 (aged 38) 200 miles off the coast of Hampton Roads, Virginia, U.S.

Champ Car career
- 43 races run over 7 years
- Best finish: 6th (1927)
- First race: 1912 Jepsen Trophy (Santa Monica)
- Last race: 1928 International Motor Classic (Rockingham Park)
- First win: 1926 Charlotte 250 (Charlotte)
Wins	Podiums	Poles
1	5	0

Francis Earl Devore (occasionally spelt DeVore, December 2, 1889 – November 12, 1928) was an American racing driver. DeVore and fellow driver Norman Batten were aboard the SS Vestris ocean liner when it sank. He is credited with saving the lives of his wife, and Batten's wife. Both Batten and DeVore were lost at sea. Devore's son, Billy, also became a racing driver.

== Motorsports career results ==
=== Indianapolis 500 results ===
Year	Car	Start	Qual	Rank	Finish	Laps	Led	Retired
1925	24	15	97.799	19	13	198	0	Flagged
1927	10	15	107.497	23	2	200	0	Running
1928	6	24	109.810	18	18	161	0	Crash T1
Totals						559	0	

Starts	3
Poles	0
Front Row	0
Wins	0
Top 5	1
Top 10	1
Retired	1
