= Zeke Meyer =

American racing driver (1891–1962)

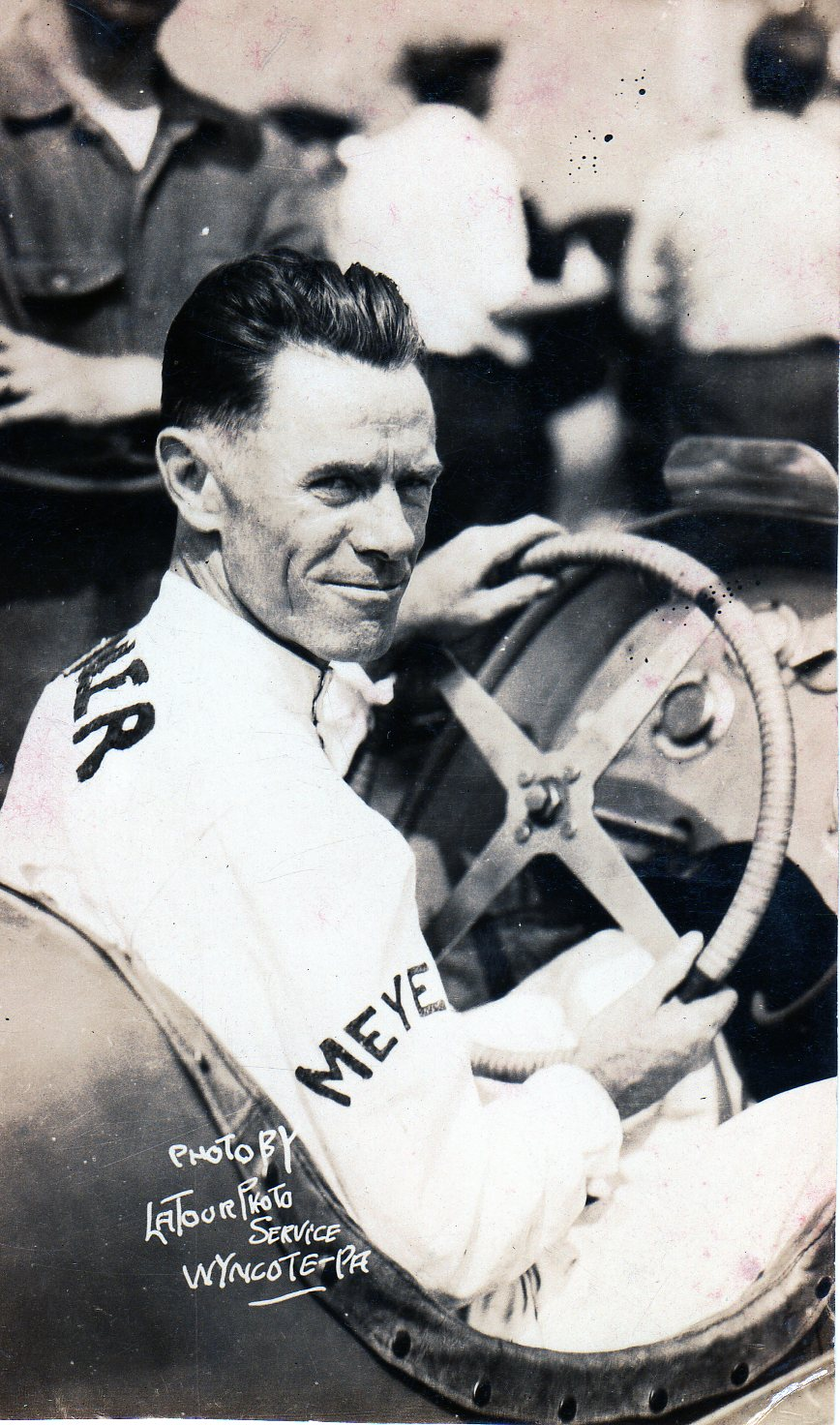
- Born: Herbert Ernest Meyer; March 19, 1891 Cranston, Rhode Island, U.S.
- Died: April 27, 1962 (aged 71) Philadelphia, Pennsylvania, U.S.

Champ Car career
- 17 races run over 12 years
- Best finish: 9th (1932)
- First race: 1926 Carl G. Fisher Trophy (Fulford)
- Last race: 1936 Indianapolis 500 (Indianapolis)
Wins	Podiums	Poles
0	2	0

Herbert Ernest "Zeke" Meyer (March 19, 1891 – April 27, 1962) was an American racing driver.

Meyer was not related to fellow racer Louis Meyer.

== Motorsports career results ==
=== Indianapolis 500 results ===
Year	Car	Start	Qual	Rank	Finish	Laps	Led	Retired
1930	21	34	95.357	26	16	115	0	Rod
1932	37	38	110.745	24	6	200	0	Running
1933	9	16	111.099	25	9	200	0	Running
1936	53	32	111.476	30	9	200	0	Running
Totals						715	0	

Starts	4
Poles	0
Front Row	0
Wins	0
Top 5	0
Top 10	3
Retired	1

== Gallery ==
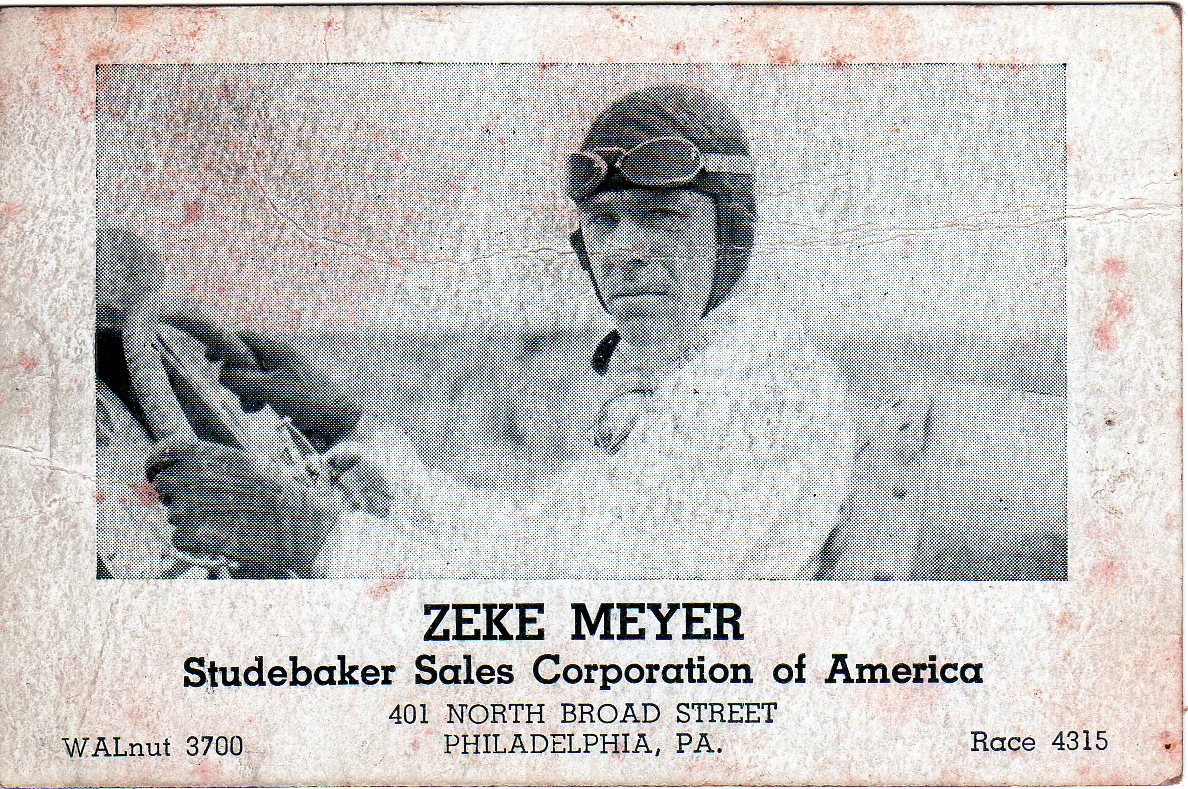
Zeke Meyer Studebaker Business Card

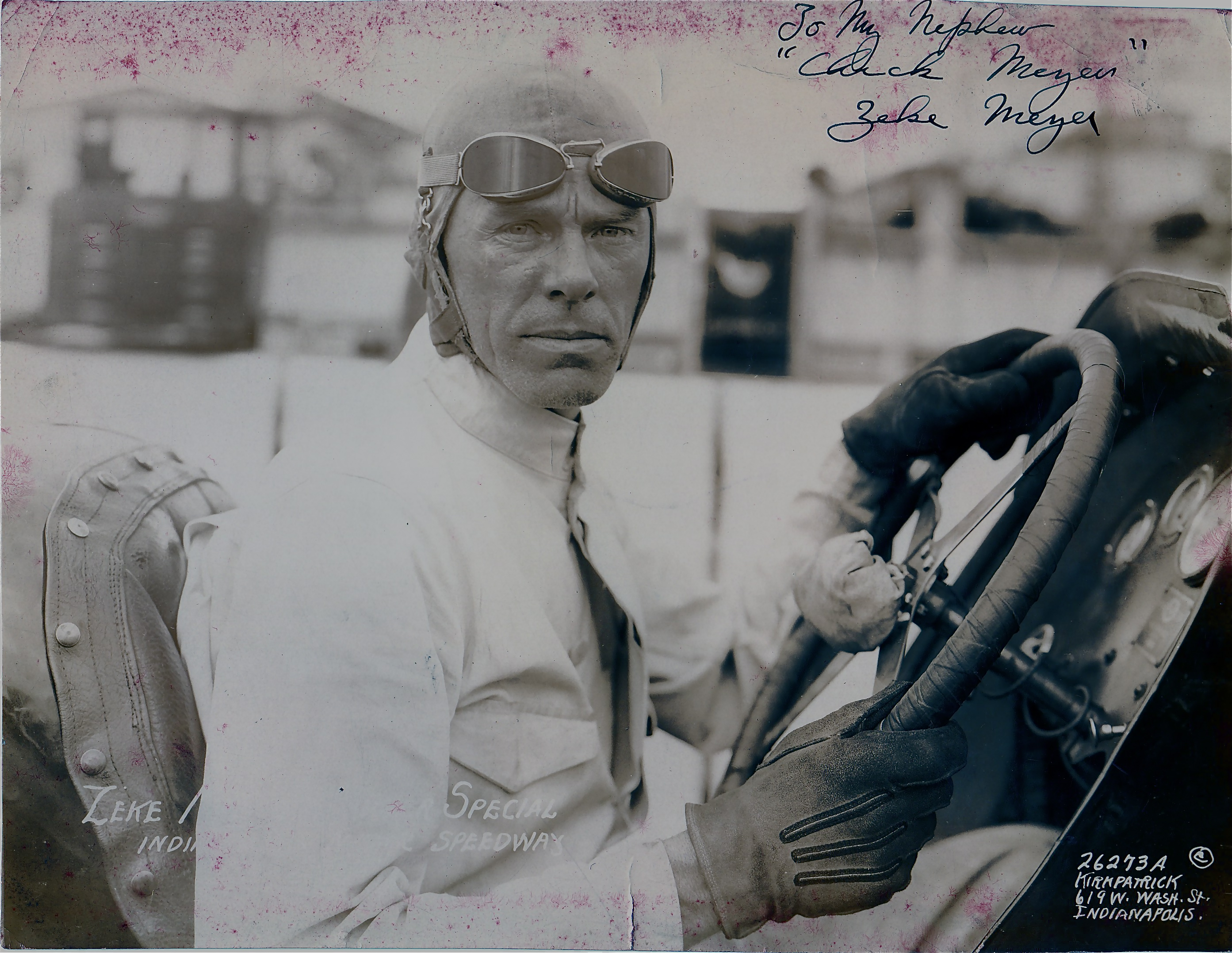
Zeke Meyer

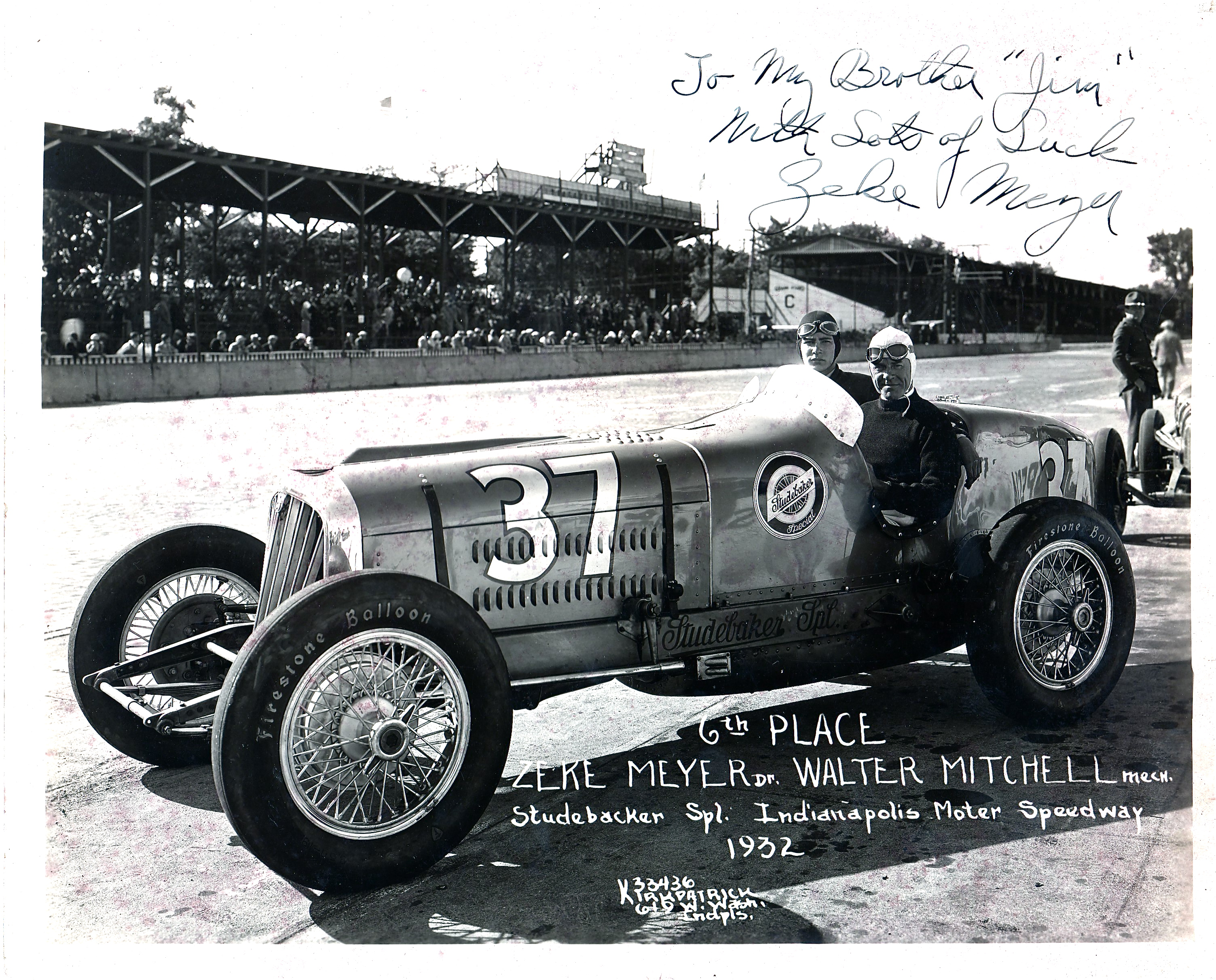
Zeke Meyer 6th place in 1932
