= Harry Hartz =

American racing driver (1896–1974)

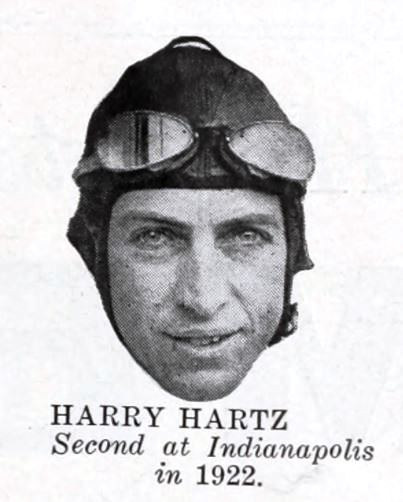
- Hartz, circa 1924
- Born: Harry Henry Hartz; December 24, 1896 Pomona, California, U.S.
- Died: September 26, 1974 (aged 77) Indianapolis, Indiana, U.S.

Championship titles
- AAA Championship Car (1926)

Champ Car career
- 74 races run over 7 years
- Best finish: 1st (1926)
- First race: 1921 Beverly Hills 250 (Beverly Hills)
- Last race: 1927 65-mile Race (Rockingham Park)
- First win: 1922 Golden State Motor Derby (San Carlos)
- Last win: 1926 50-mile Semi-Final (Charlotte)
Wins	Podiums	Poles
7	39	3

Harry Henry Hartz (December 24, 1896 – September 26, 1974) was an American racing driver and auto mechanic. He was the 1926 American Automobile Association (AAA) Contest Board sanctioned national driving champion.

== Career ==
Hartz was born in Pomona, California, and grew up in the Los Angeles area. At age eighteen, he began to drive in support events for the car races of the time. He was a mechanic, but sought to be a race car driver and signed on with the Duesenberg brothers after World War I. Hartz made his debut at the 1921 Indianapolis 500 race as Eddie Hearne's riding mechanic.

The following year, Hartz was behind the wheel of the Duesenberg and finished in second place. In 1923, he finished in second place again in a Cliff Durant Special, and placed in fourth position next year. On Thanksgiving Day of that same year, he was driving during pre-race test run at a track in Los Angeles when he struck and killed both a photographic journalist, and George L. Wade, constructor and owner of the car driven by Harlan Fengler.

In 1925, Hartz purchased his own 121 cu in (2.0 L) Miller, finishing fourth, and returned the next year with his 90 cu in (1.5 L) Miller Special to capture second place. His car had a mechanical failure in 1927. He is the only driver to come in second in the Indianapolis 500 three times, but never to win the race in his six attempts.

Hartz was successful in board track racing. He finished in the top five positions 46 times out of the 69 major events he started, and won seven championship events.

Hartz was badly burned and injured in a crash in 1927 at the Rockingham Speedway in Salem, New Hampshire, requiring him to spend the next two years in hospitals. The stock market crash of 1929 also inflicted heavy financial losses for him. He retired from racing to become a team owner and chief mechanic. Hartz bought a used 1927 Miller 91 front-drive race car, and built the car for the junk-formula by widening the chassis and installing a bored-out Miller 122 (151 cu in). Together with Billy Arnold as driver, the combination was successful, and they won the 1930 Indy 500 race and also took the national championship for the year.

Hartz appeared in the racing sequences for the 1932 movie The Crowd Roars.

Hartz worked for Studebaker for many years. After Chrysler began using auto racing as a promotional tool to sell its cars, in 1933 DeSoto recruited Hartz for a publicity stunt by driving a car backwards across the country. During mid-August 1934, he set 72 new AAA stock car records at the Bonneville Salt Flats course in Utah in a Chrysler Imperial Airflow coupe. At the end of the month, Hartz drove the same car from Los Angeles to New York City and set an economy record of 18.1 miles per US gallon (13.0 L/100 km; 21.7 mpg_{‑imp}), and without having to add water at any time during all of these performance runs. Another source credits him with driving the newly introduced DeSoto Airflow 3,114 miles (5,011 km) from New York to San Francisco, and averaging 21.4 mpg_{‑US} (11.0 L/100 km; 25.7 mpg_{‑imp}), with a total fuel bill of US$33.06 for the run. He also appeared at the 1933 Chicago World's Fair as a stunt driver at the Chrysler Exhibit.

After having much success, Hartz retired in 1940. Later, he had a serious automobile accident from which he never fully recovered. He died in Indianapolis, Indiana at age 77. He is buried at Crown Hill Cemetery in Indianapolis, Indiana. (Garden Mausoleum, Lot C-18)

== Awards and honors ==
Hartz was inducted into the Auto Racing Hall of Fame (1963) and the National Sprint Car Hall of Fame (1998).

Hartz also received the Automotive Hall of Fame Distinguished Service Citation (1967).

== Motorsports career results ==
=== Indianapolis 500 results ===
Year	Car	Start	Qual	Rank	Finish	Laps	Led	Retired
1922	12	2	99.970	2	2	200	42	Running
1923	7	2	103.700	3	2	200	6	Running
1924	4	2	107.130	2	4	200	0	Running
1925	6	3	112.433	3	4	200	3	Running
1926	3	2	109.542	2	2	158	6	Flagged
1927	1	4	116.739	4	25	38	0	Crankshaft
Totals						996	57	

Starts	6
Poles	0
Front row	5
Wins	0
Top 5	5
Top 10	5
Retired	1
