= Atlantic City Speedway =

Oval racing track in Hammonton, New Jersey

Amatol Race Track
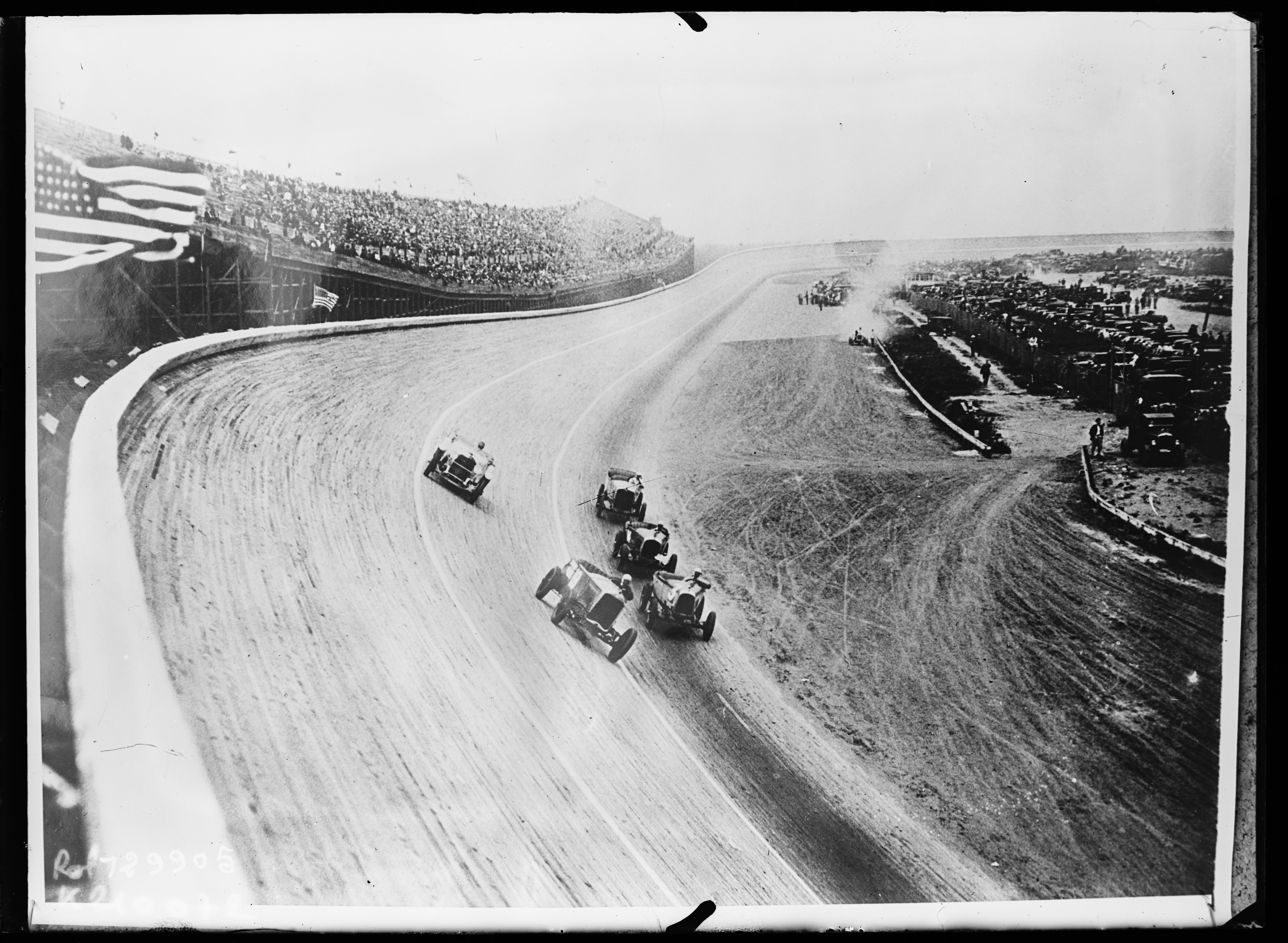
- Race in june 1928
- Location: Hammonton, New Jersey
- Coordinates: 39°36′12″N 74°44′28″W
- Capacity: 310,000
- Operator: Atlantic City Motor Speedway Association
- Opened: 1926
- Closed: 1933

Oval
- Surface: Board
- Length: 2.4 km (1.5 mi)
- Banking: 45°

The Atlantic City Speedway was a board oval racing track located near Hammonton, New Jersey. The track was built in 1926, and hosted eight American Automobile Association sanctioned races before the track was demolished in 1933.

As of 2025, the scar that the track left behind can still faintly be seen on Google Maps.

== AAA Champ Car race winners ==
Season	Date	Winning Driver	Chassis	Engine
1926	May 1	Harry Hartz	Miller	Miller
1926	July 17	Harry Hartz	Miller	Miller
1926	July 17	Norman Batten	Miller	Miller
1926	July 17	Fred Comer	Miller	Miller
1926	July 17	Harry Hartz	Miller	Miller
1927	May 7	Dave Lewis	Miller	Miller
1928	July 4	Freddie Winnai	Duesenberg	Duesenberg
1928	September 16	Ray Keech	Miller	Miller
