= 1926 Indianapolis 500 =

American motor race

14th Indianapolis 500
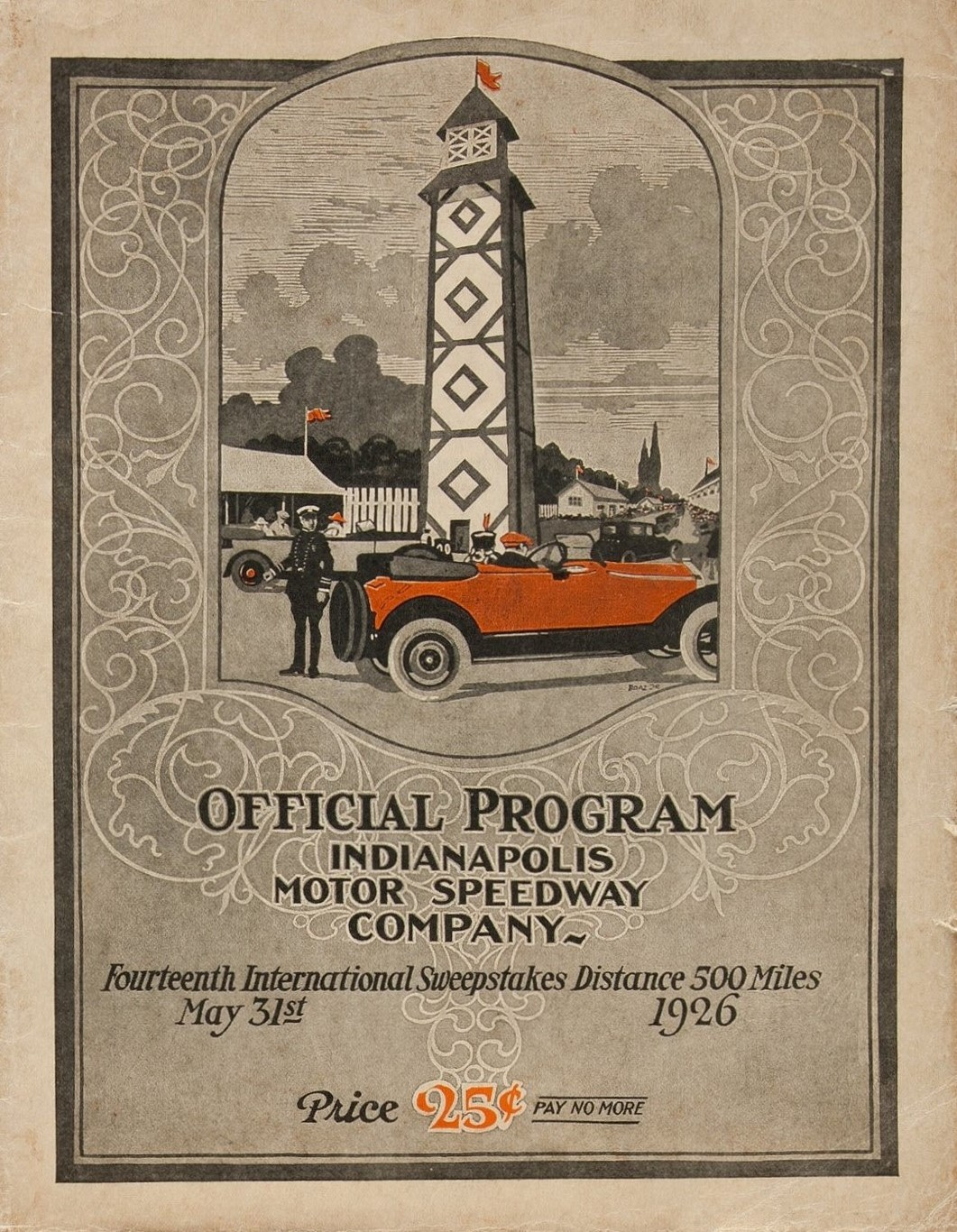

Indianapolis Motor Speedway

Indianapolis 500
- Sanctioning body: AAA
- Date: May 31, 1926
- Winner: Frank Lockhart
- Winning Entrant: Pete Kreis
- Winning Chief Mechanic: Jimmy Lee
- Winning time: 4:10:14.95
- Average speed: 95.904 mph (154.343 km/h)
- Pole position: Earl Cooper
- Pole speed: 111.735 mph (179.820 km/h)
- Most laps led: Frank Lockhart (95)

Pre-race
- Pace car: Chrysler Imperial 80
- Pace car driver: Louis Chevrolet
- Starter: Seth Klein
- Honorary referee: Arthur Brisbane
- Estimated attendance: 135,000

Chronology
Previous	Next
1925	1927

The 14th International 500-Mile Sweepstakes Race was held at the Indianapolis Motor Speedway on Monday, May 31, 1926. Louis Chevrolet drove the Chrysler pace car for the start.

Rain halted the race at lap 72, and officials waited for the track to dry out. The race was resumed over an hour later. Rain fell again, and the race was called at the 400 mile mark (160 laps).

Rookie Frank Lockhart moved up from 20th to fifth by lap 5, having had passed 14 cars on that lap alone. He moved up to second on Lap 16. After the rain delay, Lockhart and Dave Lewis battled for the lead for about 20 laps, until Lewis dropped out. After Lewis retired with a broken valve, Harry Hartz closed on Lockhart and briefly took the lead at about 250 miles as the crowd roared. But soon afterward Hartz was forced to make an unscheduled pit stop. Lockhart then stretched out a two-lap lead when the race was called, and he was declared the winner. It was the first rain-shortened race in "500" history, and Lockhart was the fourth rookie to win the race. Lockhart may have actually completed as many as 163 laps (407.5 miles), but official scoring results reverted to the completion of lap 160.

== Time trials ==
Four-lap (10 mile) qualifying runs were utilized. Earl Cooper won the pole position. Frank Lockhart set a new 1-lap track record during his first attempt at 115.488 mph, but the run was aborted after a tire failure on the second lap. He later blew an engine during another attempt, and finally put a car in the field 20th on the grid.

Qualifying Results
Date	Driver	Lap 1 (mph)	Lap 2 (mph)	Lap 3 (mph)	Lap 4 (mph)	Average Speed (mph)
5/27/1926	Earl Cooper	113.68	112.97	111.32	109.09	111.735

== Starting grid ==
Row	Inside		Middle		Outside	
1	5	(United States) Earl Cooper	3	(United States) Harry Hartz	10	(United States) Leon Duray
2	1	(United States) Dave Lewis	4	(United States) Phil Shafer	7	(United States) Jules Ellingboe
3	16	(United States) Bennett Hill	6	(United States) Frank Elliott	34	(Canada) Bon MacDougall R
4	22	(United States) W. E. Shattuc	9	(United States) Cliff Durant	31	(United States) Tony Gulotta R
5	8	(United States) Fred Comer	36	(United States) Cliff Woodbury R	19	(United States) Ralph Hepburn
6	14	(United States) Norman Batten R	27	(United Kingdom) Douglas Hawkes	29	(United States) Ben Jones R
7	29	(France) Albert Guyot	15	(United States) Frank Lockhart R	33	(United States) Thane Houser R
8	24	(United States) Steve Nemesh R	43	(United Kingdom) Ernest Eldridge R	23	(United States) L. L. Corum W
9	28	(United States) Jack McCarver R	17	(United States) Fred Lecklider R	12	(United States) Pete DePaolo W
10	18	(Canada) John Duff R				

R Indianapolis 500 rookie
W Indianapolis 500 winner

== Box score ==
1926 Indianapolis 500 pace car

The 1926 winning car

Finish	Start	No	Name	Entrant	Car	Qual	Rank	Laps	Status
1	20	15	(United States) Frank Lockhart R	Pete Kreis	Miller	95.780	19	160	95.904 mph
2	2	3	(United States) Harry Hartz	Harry Hartz	Miller	109.542	2	158	Flagged
3	14	36	(United States) Cliff Woodbury R	Cliff R. Woodbury	Miller	105.109	10	158	Flagged
4	13	8	(United States) Fred Comer (Wade Morton 71–139)	Harry Hartz	Miller	100.612	16	155	Flagged
5	27	12	(United States) Pete DePaolo W	Duesenberg Brothers	Duesenberg	96.709	18	153	Flagged
6	8	6	(United States) Frank Elliott (Leon Duray Laps 76–104)	Frank Elliott	Miller	105.873	8	152	Flagged
7	16	14	(United States) Norman Batten R	Norman Batten	Miller	101.428	15	151	Flagged
8	15	19	(United States) Ralph Hepburn (Bob McDonogh Laps 25–65)	Ralph Hepburn	Miller	102.517	14	151	Flagged
9	28	18	(Canada) John Duff R	Al Cotey	Miller	95.549	20	147	Flagged
10	5	4	(United States) Phil Shafer (Fred Lecklider Laps 52–54) (Fred Lecklider Laps 113–146)	Phil Shafer	Miller	106.647	5	146	Flagged
11	12	31	(United States) Tony Gulotta R	Harry Hartz	Miller	102.789	13	142	Flagged
12	7	16	(United States) Bennett Hill (Jules Ellingboe Laps 39–40) (Jules Ellingboe Laps 78–113)	Harry A. Miller	Miller	105.876	7	136	Flagged
13	21	33	(United States) Thane Houser R	George G. Abell	Miller	93.672	22	102	Flagged
14	17	27	(United Kingdom) Douglas Hawkes (Ernest Eldridge Laps 57–73)	E. A. D. Eldridge	Eldridge–Anzani	94.977	21	91	Camshaft
15	4	1	(United States) Dave Lewis (Earl Cooper Laps 90–91)	Harry A. Miller	Miller	107.009	4	91	Valve
16	1	5	(United States) Earl Cooper	Harry A. Miller	Miller	111.735	1	73	Transmission
17	11	9	(United States) Cliff Durant (Eddie Hearne 42–60)	R. Cliff Durant	Fengler–Locomobile	104.855	12	60	Fuel tank leak
18	18	29	(United States) Ben Jones R	Duesenberg Brothers	Duesenberg	92.142	24	54	Crash
19	23	26	(United Kingdom) Ernest Eldridge R (Herschel McKee Laps 22–32)	E. A. D. Eldridge	Eldridge–Anzani	89.777	25	45	Tie rod
20	24	23	(United States) L. L. Corum W	Albert Schmidt	Schmidt–Argyll	88.849	26	44	Shock absorbers
21	22	24	(United States) Steve Nemesh R	Albert Schmidt	Schmidt–Argyll	92.937	23	41	Transmission
22	6	7	(United States) Jules Ellingboe	F. P. Cramer	Miller	106.376	6	39	Supercharger
23	3	10	(United States) Leon Duray	R. Cliff Durant	Fengler–Locomobile	109.186	3	33	Broken axle
24	26	17	(United States) Fred Lecklider R	Earl Devore	Miller	100.398	17	24	Rod
25	25	28	(United States) Jack McCarver R	Chevrolet Brothers	Fronty-Ford T	86.418	28	23	Rod
26	9	34	(Canada) Bon MacDougall R	R. G. McDougall	Miller	105.180	9	19	Valve
27	10	22	(United States) W. E. Shattuc	Dr. W. E. Shattuc, M.D.	Miller	104.977	11	15	Valve
28	19	39	(France) Albert Guyot	Albert Schmidt	Schmidt–Argyll	88.580	27	8	Piston

Note: Relief drivers in parentheses

W Former Indianapolis 500 winner

R Indianapolis 500 Rookie

=== Race statistics ===
Lap Leaders
Laps	Leader
1-15	Phil Shafer
16–21	Dave Lewis
22	Phil Shafer
23–59	Dave Lewis
60–100	Frank Lockhart
101–106	Harry Hartz
107–160	Frank Lockhart

Total laps led
Leader	Laps
Frank Lockhart	95
Dave Lewis	43
Phil Shafer	16
Harry Hartz	6

== Race details ==
- For 1926, riding mechanics were optional, however, no teams utilized them.
- First alternate: none
- This would be the first Indy 500 where a driver from the inaugural Indy 500 did not compete.

Grand Prix Race
Previous race: 1925 Italian Grand Prix	1926 Grand Prix season Grandes Épreuves	Next race: 1926 French Grand Prix
Previous race: 1925 Indianapolis 500	Indianapolis 500	Next race: 1927 Indianapolis 500
