= Steve Nemesh =

American racing driver (1896–1975)

- Born: István Nemes; December 31, 1896 Szécsény, Nógrád County, Hungary, Austro-Hungarian Empire
- Died: September 18, 1975 (aged 78) San Bernardino, California, U.S.

Champ Car career
- 1 race run over 1 year
- Best finish: 24th (1927)
- First race: 1926 Indianapolis 500 (Indianapolis)
Wins	Podiums	Poles
0	0	0

Stephen Nemesh (born István Nemes, December 31, 1896 – September 18, 1975) was an American racing driver.

== Biography ==
Nemesh was born István Nemes but anglicized his name after immigrating to the U.S. He became a U.S. citizen in 1924.

Nemesh competed in the 1921 Pikes Peak Hill Climb, driving a Paige Special as a teammate to Ralph Mulford.

Nemesh's only American Championship car racing start was the 1926 Indianapolis 500, where he drove an Argyle powered Schmidt chassis. He started 22nd and was sidelined after completing 41 laps by transmission failure. He was credited with 21st place. He drove as a relief driver in the 1927 Indianapolis 500 for Dave Evans.

== Motorsports career results ==
=== Indianapolis 500 results ===
Year	Car	Start	Qual	Rank	Finish	Laps	Led	Retired
1926	24	22	92.937	23	21	41	0	Transmission
Totals						41	0	

Starts	1
Poles	0
Front Row	0
Wins	0
Top 5	0
Top 10	0
Retired	1
