= Dave Lewis (racing driver) =

American racing driver (1881–1928)

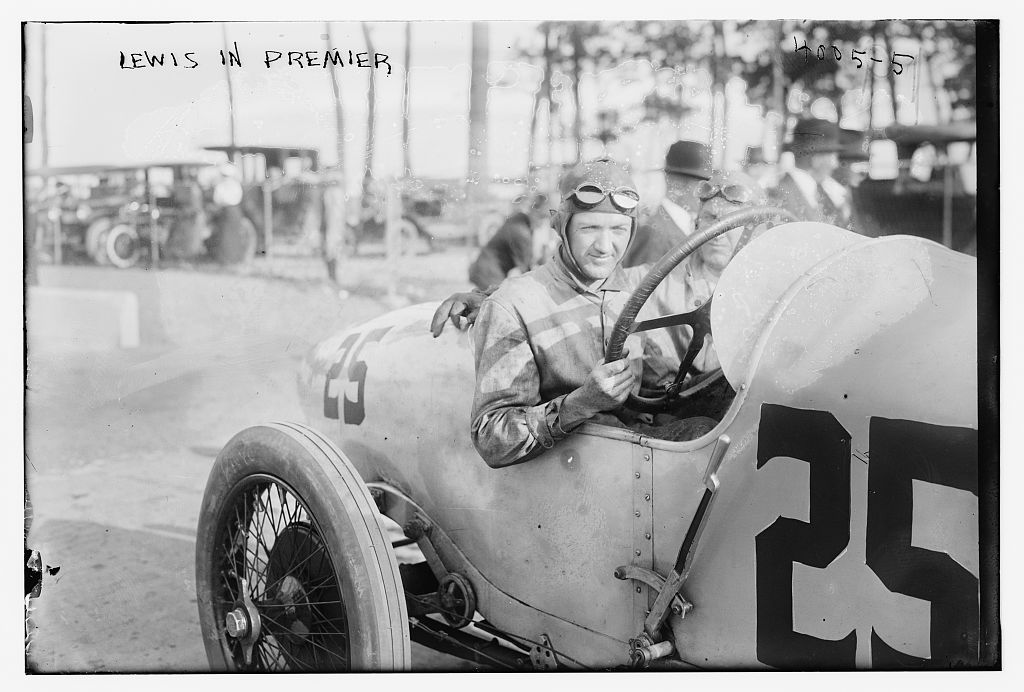
- Lewis at the 1916 Astor Cup
- Born: May 11, 1881 Los Angeles, California, U.S.
- Died: May 13, 1928 (aged 47) Saugus, California, U.S.

Champ Car career
- 76 races run over 14 years
- Best finish: 7th (1925, 1926)
- First race: 1911 Dick Ferris Trophy (Santa Monica)
- Last race: 1927 Altoona 200 #1 (Altoona)
- First win: 1919 Independence Auto Derby, Heat #2 (Uniontown)
- Last win: 1927 Atlantic City 200 (Atlantic City)
Wins	Podiums	Poles
5	21	3

Dave Lewis (May 11, 1881 – May 13, 1928) was an American racing driver. He was born in Los Angeles, California. He competed in the Indianapolis 500 four times, with a best finish of second in 1925. His appearance in the 1925 race with a Miller car was the first time that a front-wheel drive car had competed in the Indianapolis 500.

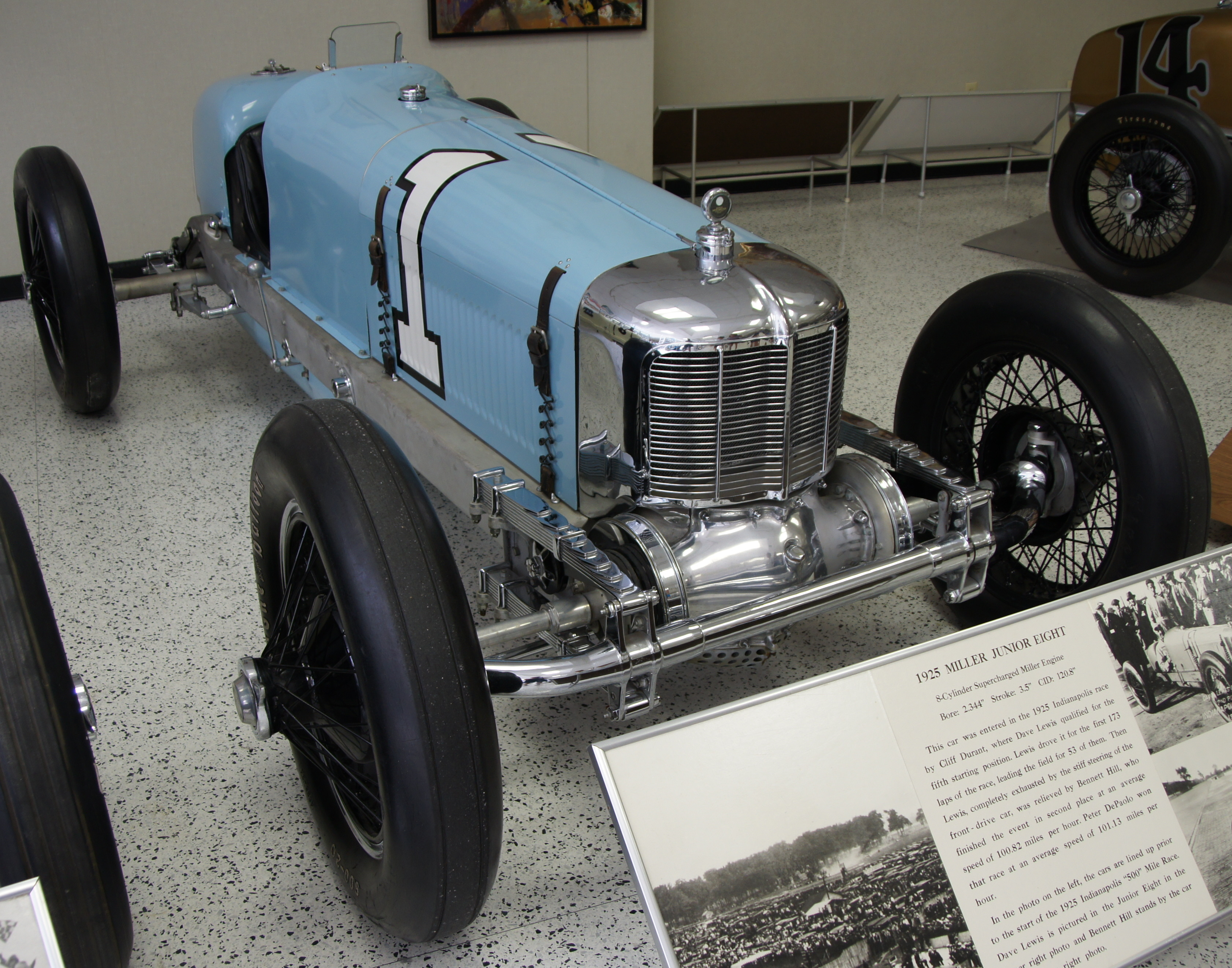
Lewis drove this car to a second-place finish in the 1925 Indianapolis 500

== Personal life ==
Lewis was the brother-in-law of Harry Miller. Lewis committed suicide in La Joya Lodge, California, located near the present day Green Valley, with a shotgun after a brush fire on his ranch got out of control.

== Motorsports career results ==
=== Indianapolis 500 results ===
Year	Car	Start	Qual	Rank	Finish	Laps	Led	Retired
1916	25	18	83.120	20	14	71	0	Gas tank
1925	1	5	109.061	5	2	200	50	Running
1926	1	4	107.009	4	15	91	43	Valve
1927	7	8	112.275	9	33	21	0	Front axle
Totals						383	93	

Starts	4
Poles	0
Front Row	0
Wins	0
Top 5	1
Top 10	1
Retired	3
