= Jack McCarver =

American racing driver (1896–1959)

- Born: William Clarence John McCarver; December 19, 1896 Fort Worth, Texas, U.S.
- Died: June 21, 1959 (aged 62) Waco, Texas, U.S.

Champ Car career
- 1 race run over 1 year
- First race: 1926 Indianapolis 500 (Indianapolis)
Wins	Podiums	Poles
0	0	0

William Clarence John McCarver (December 19, 1896 – June 21, 1959) was an American racing driver.

McCarver worked for Chevrolet for nearly 20 years as an engineer and test driver, and his work with them led to him taking up a racing career. He later worked as a used car salesman in Dallas, Texas, before retiring due to ill health in 1957 - ill health taking his life two years later.

== Motorsports career results ==
=== Indianapolis 500 results ===
Year	Car	Start	Qual	Rank	Finish	Laps	Led	Retired
1926	28	25	86.418	28	25	23	0	Rod
Totals						23	0	

Starts	1
Poles	0
Front Row	0
Wins	0
Top 5	0
Top 10	0
Retired	1
