= M. L. Fredericks =

American motorcycle racer

M. L. Fredericks, nicknamed "Curley" (or "Curly"), was an American motorcycle racer.

Fredericks was born in Denver, Colorado. In 1921, he became the American Motorcycle Association's Class A (stock) champion, riding for Indian.

On August 21, 1926, riding an Indian Altoona racing bike at Rockingham Park in Salem, New Hampshire, Fredricks turned a 1.25 mi (2.01 km) lap in 37.4 seconds. In doing so, he set a record of 120.3 mph (193.6 km/h), fastest ever on a board track. The record still stands.

Fredericks was also 1928 AMA National Champion, on a 45 cu in (740 cc) Indian. His victory on 4 August 1928 would be the last ever recorded on a board track. Fredericks was inducted into the AMA Hall of Fame in 1998

== Sources ==
- AMA Hall of Fame Museum
- Harley-Davidson online
- Pioneers of American Motorcycle Racing (Daniel K. Statnekov website)
