= Fulford–Miami Speedway =

Race track in North Miami Beach, Florida, U.S.

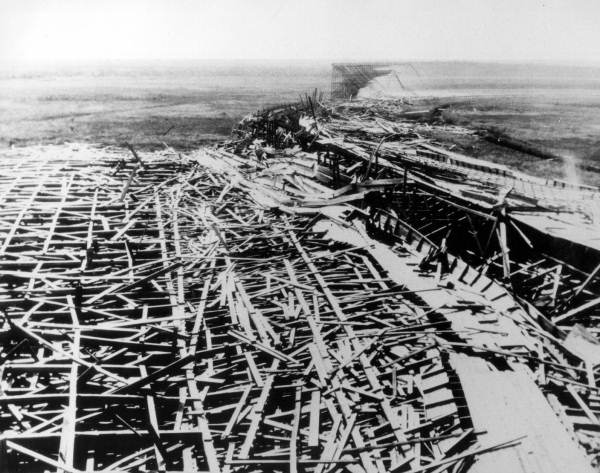
- Remains of the track after the 1926 Miami hurricane
- Location: North Miami Beach, Florida, United States
- Coordinates: 25°57′09″N 80°10′01″W
- Broke ground: 1925
- Opened: 1926
- Closed: 1926
- Architect: Carl Fisher; Ray Harroun
- Major events: Carl G. Fisher Trophy

Oval
- Surface: Wood
- Length: 2.01 km (1.25 mi)
- Turns: 4
- Banking: 50°

The Fulford–Miami Speedway was a AAA Championship Car wood race track located in North Miami Beach, Florida. It was the first speedway built in South Florida. The 1.25 mi (2.01 km) track was built in 1925 by Indianapolis Motor Speedway co-founder Carl Fisher, who was also developing the city. To help build the track, Fisher hired 1911 Indianapolis 500 winner Ray Harroun, who also served as general manager of the track. The track's banking was at 50°, and as a result, cars had to drive at a speed of 110 mph (180 km/h) in order to remain on the track without sliding off. In comparison, the Daytona International Speedway's banking is 31°. Because of the speed the track's configuration produced, the track was considered as the fastest in the world.

The track held only one event, the Carl G. Fisher Trophy in the 1926 AAA Championship Car season. The race was 240 laps and 300 mi (480 km), and was held on February 22, 1926, with a crowd of 20,000. The race's official starter was Barney Oldfield. The pole position was won by Tommy Milton with a lap speed of 142.93 mph (230.02 km/h), while the race was won by 1925 Indianapolis 500 winner Peter DePaolo, with Harry Hartz finishing second, less than a minute behind. Out of the 19 cars competing, only six finished the race. On September 17, 1926, the track was destroyed by the Great Miami Hurricane; the lumber that comprised the track's surface was scattered across the neighborhood, and was later, after being recovered, used by the city for reconstruction. After its destruction, the area was taken over by the Presidential County Club. South Florida did not have a major auto race again until 1983, when the Grand Prix of Miami was held on a street circuit in downtown Miami. Two years later, open wheel racing returned when CART used a street course at Tamiami Park for their season finale, the Beatrice Indy Challenge.
