= Board track racing =

Type of motorsport

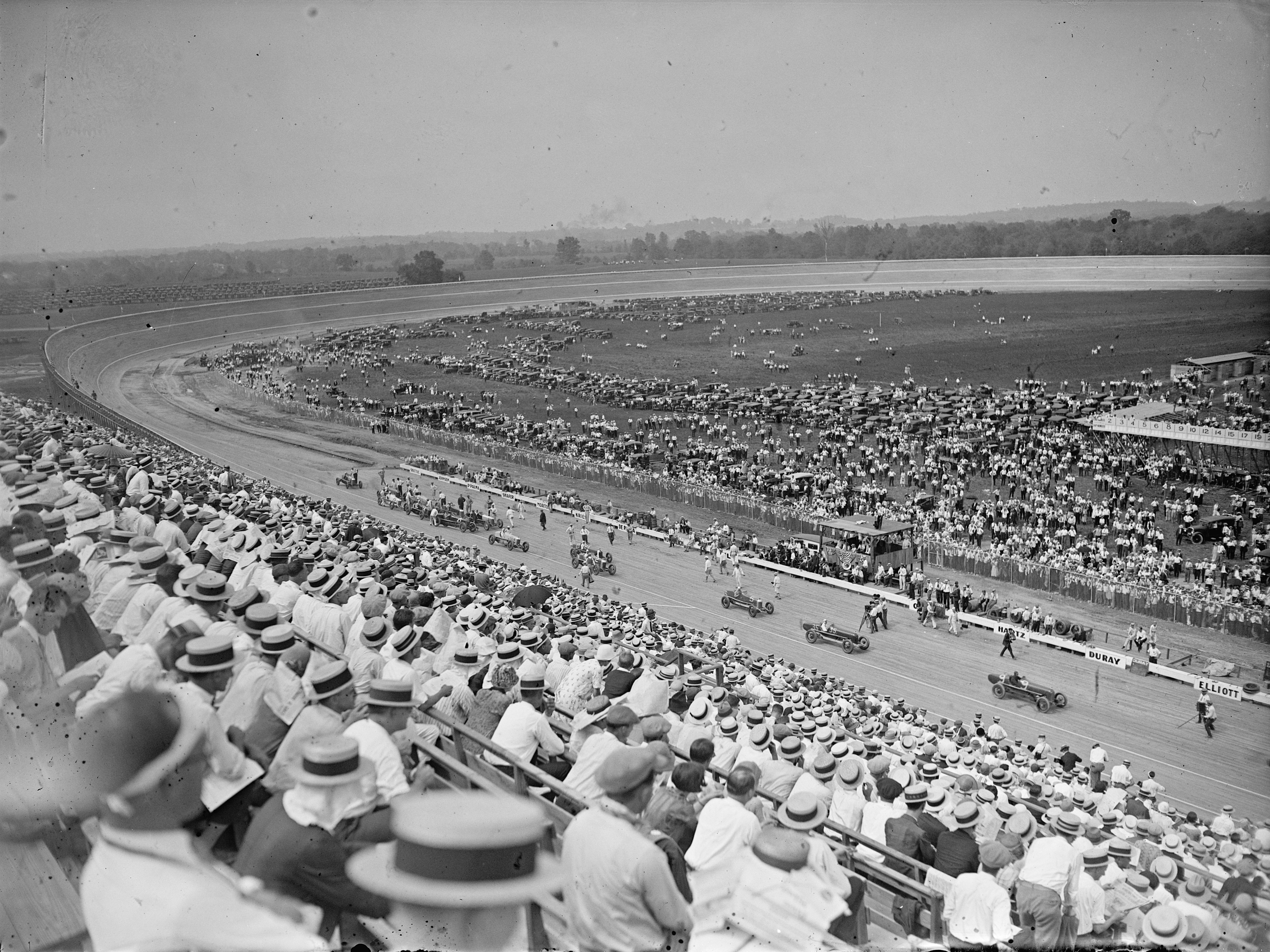
Race teams grid-up for the start of a race at Baltimore-Washington Speedway in 1925.

Board track racing was a type of motorsport popular in the United States during the 1910s and 1920s. Competition was conducted on circular or oval race courses with surfaces composed of wooden planks. This type of track was first used for motorcycle competition, wherein they were called motordromes, before being adapted for use by various different types of racing cars. The majority of the American national championship races were contested at such venues during the 1920s.

Board tracks proliferated in part because they were inexpensive to construct, but they lacked durability and required a great deal of maintenance to remain usable. Many of the tracks survived for as little as three years before being abandoned.

With the onset of the Great Depression in the early 1930s, board track racing disappeared rapidly. However, several of its most notable aspects have continued to influence American motorsports up to the present day, including: a technical emphasis on raw speed produced by the steep banking; ample track width to allow steady overtaking between competitors; and the development of extensive grandstands or stadium-style spectator seating surrounding many of the courses.

== History ==
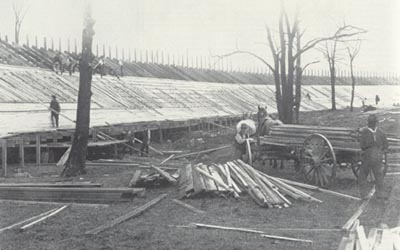
Construction of a board track at Uniontown, Pennsylvania in 1916

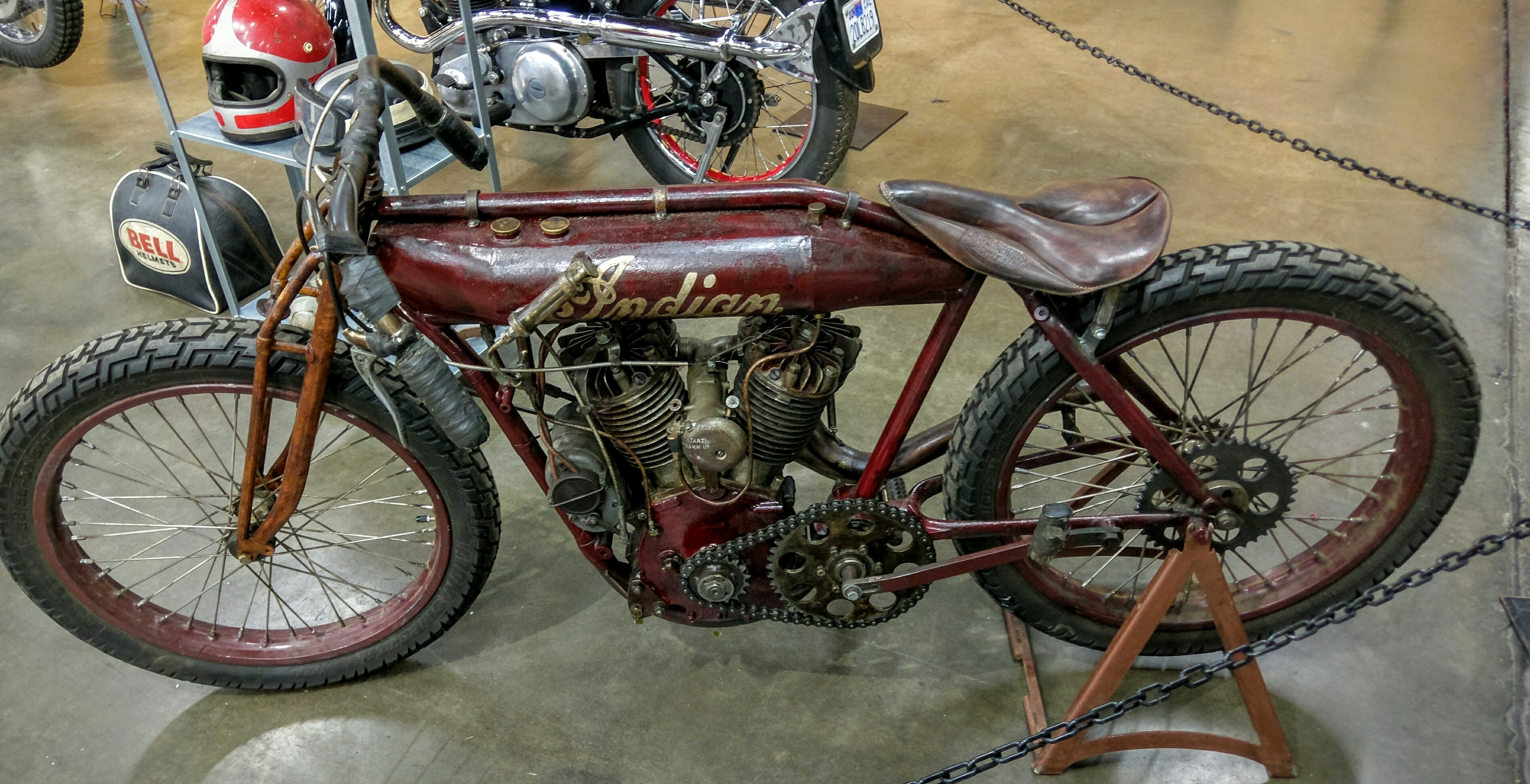
1912 Indian Board Track Racer, on display at the California Automobile Museum

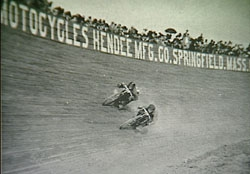
Motorcycles racing on a board track in 1911

Some early board tracks were circular. This is a view of the Los Angeles Motordrome, the first of its kind.

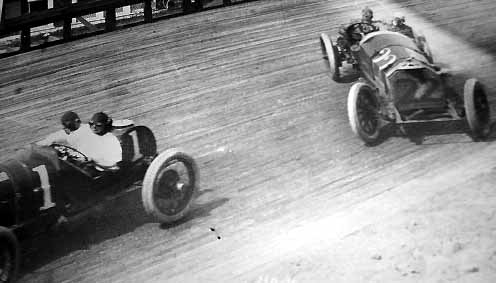
Barney Oldfield (left) racing a car on a board track in 1915

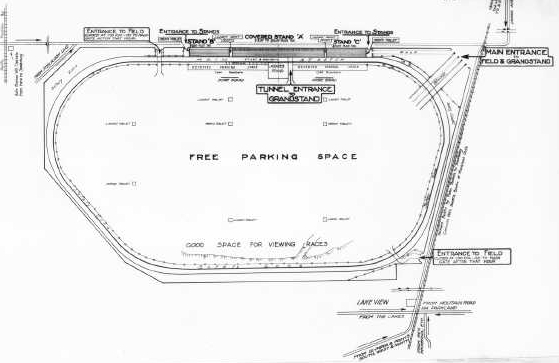
Qualifying speeds at two-mile Tacoma Speedway were sometimes higher than those at Indianapolis.

The first board track for motor racing was the circular Los Angeles Motordrome, built in 1910 in the area that would later become the city's Playa del Rey district. Based on the same technology as European velodromes used for bicycle racing, this track and others like it were constructed with 2×4 boards, often with turns banked at up to 45°. In some cases, such as the track at Culver City, banking was 50° or more. Longer tracks were later built – some up to 2 miles (3.2 km) long by 1915 - and lap speeds exceeding 100 miles per hour became commonplace.

Interest in motorsport was exploding during this period and by 1929, at least 24 board tracks had been built around the country, although by 1931, 20 of the 24 had been shut down or abandoned, and from 1932 on there were no more championship-level races run on boards. The tracks were relatively inexpensive to construct compared to more permanent facilities – the total facility cost of the 2-mile (3.2 km) Tacoma Speedway was just $100,000 in 1915, compared to the $700,000 spent in 1909 just to pave the 2.5-mile (4.0 km) Indianapolis Motor Speedway.

| Name | Location | Track length | Years active |
|---|---|---|---|
| Los Angeles Motordrome | Playa del Rey, California | 1.0 mile (1.6 km) | 1910–1913 |
| Oakland Motordrome | Elmhurst, California | 0.5 miles (0.80 km) | 1911–1912 |
| Speedway Park | Chicago, Illinois | 2.0 miles (3.2 km) | 1915–1918 |
| Des Moines Speedway | Valley Junction, Iowa | 1.0 mile (1.6 km) | 1915–1917 |
| Omaha Speedway | Omaha, Nebraska | 1.25 miles (2.01 km) | 1915–1917 |
| Sheepshead Bay Speedway | Brooklyn, New York | 2.0 miles (3.2 km) | 1915–1919 |
| Tacoma Speedway | Tacoma, Washington | 2.0 miles (3.2 km) | 1915–1922 |
| Uniontown Speedway | Hopwood, Pennsylvania | 1.125 miles (1.811 km) | 1916–1922 |
| Cincinnati Motor Speedway | Sharonville, Ohio | 2.0 miles (3.2 km) | 1916–1919 |
| Beverly Hills Speedway | Beverly Hills, California | 1.25 miles (2.01 km) | 1920–1924 |
| Fresno Speedway | Fresno, California | 1.0 mile (1.6 km) | 1920–1927 |
| San Francisco Speedway | San Carlos, California | 1.25 miles (2.01 km) | 1921–1922 |
| Cotati Speedway | Santa Rosa, California | 1.25 miles (2.01 km) | 1921–1922 |
| Kansas City Speedway | Kansas City, Missouri | 1.25 miles (2.01 km) | 1922–1924 |
| Altoona Speedway | Tipton, Pennsylvania | 1.25 miles (2.01 km) | 1923–1931 |
| Charlotte Speedway | Pineville, North Carolina | 1.25 miles (2.01 km) | 1924–1927 |
| Culver City Speedway | Culver City, California | 1.25 miles (2.01 km) | 1924–1927 |
| Rockingham Park | Salem, New Hampshire | 1.25 miles (2.01 km) | 1925–1928 |
| Baltimore-Washington Speedway | Laurel, Maryland | 1.125 miles (1.811 km) | 1925–1926 |
| Fulford–Miami Speedway | Fulford, Florida | 1.25 miles (2.01 km) | 1926–1927 |
| Atlantic City Speedway | Hammonton, New Jersey | 1.5 miles (2.4 km) | 1926–1928 |
| Akron-Cleveland Speedway | Northampton Township, Ohio | 0.5 miles (0.80 km) | 1926–1930 |
| Pittsburgh-Bridgeville Speedway | Bridgeville, Pennsylvania | 0.5 miles (0.80 km) | 1927–1930 |
| Woodbridge Speedway | Woodbridge, New Jersey | 0.5 miles (0.80 km) | 1929–1931 |

Racing on these tracks often drew large crowds of paying spectators. In 1915, a crowd of 80,000 was reported in Chicago, three weeks after only 60,000 had attended the Indianapolis 500. Relatively small and isolated Tacoma (population 83,000 in 1910) had turned out 35,000 to see a race the year before. To attract both competitors and fans, race promoters offered what were then considered sensational amounts of prize money - a total purse of $25,000 was not unusual around the time of World War I.

After World War I, the Automobile Association of America's Contest Board resumed and re-organized the National Championship system. From the beginning of the 1920 season to the end of 1931, the AAA sanctioned a total of 123 championship racing events on 24 different race tracks, and 82 of those races were run on wooden surfaces. (Of the remainder, 12 were on the bricks of Indianapolis, and the other 29 were on dirt tracks or road courses.)

== Safety ==
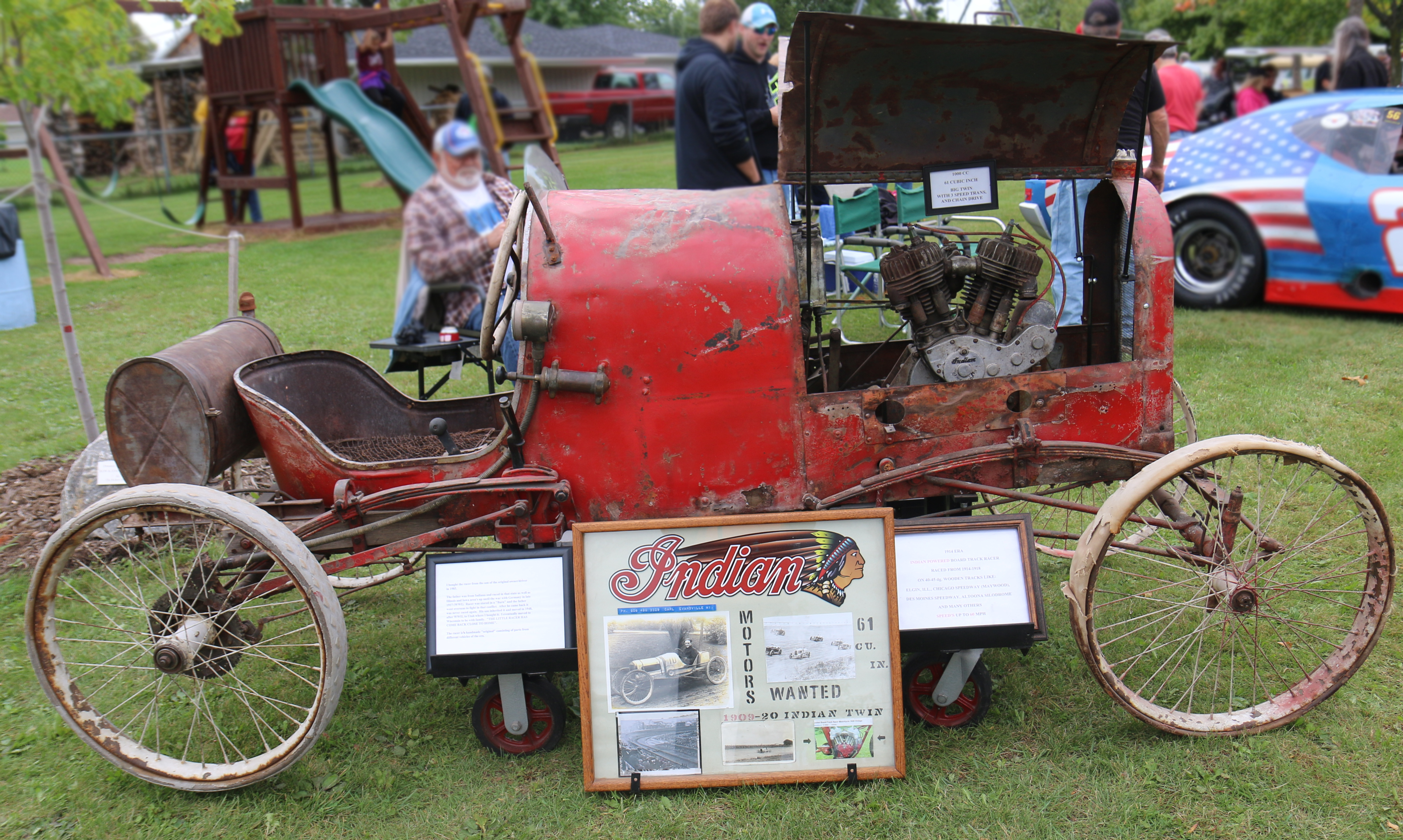
Car raced at several board tracks

The first track in Playa del Rey was banked at a 3:1 pitch (about 20 degrees), but later tracks were built with higher banking and some motorcycle tracks were banked up to 60 degrees. Even though the physics of such track designs were intuitively obvious, it was not until construction of the Beverly Hills track in 1919 that builders began to incorporate engineering knowledge that had been known to railroads for decades. At Beverly Hills, designer Art Pillsbury, who eventually worked on more than half of the championship-caliber board tracks nationwide, first employed the Searle Spiral Easement Curve, and the effect on car handling was pronounced. According to Pillsbury, a correctly engineered track could be driven without steering input from the driver – the car would steer itself, simply due to the track geometry.

The effects of these changes were higher cornering speeds and higher G-forces on drivers, but not necessarily greater safety. Driver fatalities continued to mount on board tracks into the 1920s, and included four Indianapolis 500 winners, three of which occurred at the Altoona track (another Pillsbury design) in Tipton, Pennsylvania, and three in the same years in which the driver won at Indianapolis. Winner of the 1919 Indianapolis 500 Howdy Wilcox died in an Altoona race on September 4, 1923, while co-1924 winner Joe Boyer and 1929 winner Ray Keech both suffered fatal accidents at the facility in the same years as their Indianapolis 500 wins – Keech's occurring only seventeen days after, on June 15, 1929. Gaston Chevrolet, winner of the 1920 Indianapolis 500, perished that same autumn, on November 25, 1920, in a Thanksgiving Day race at Beverly Hills.

Even when the cars did not crash, racing on a board track was exceedingly dangerous due to flying wood splinters and debris, and due to the primitive tire technology and head protection of the era. In one oral history taken from a driver, he told a tale of wooden shards driven into the faces of drivers and riding mechanics, and sudden catastrophic tire failures caused by track conditions. Cars were fitted with anti-splinter devices to protect their radiators. Other safety devices also hadn't been invented yet (seat belts, roll bars, or fire protection). Drivers often were ejected from their cars and would fall tens of feet (several meters). Drivers and riding mechanics often were driven over by their own or another car. Pete DePaolo wrote in his book Wall Smacker that racing on boards was "a great sensation, tearing around a board speedway dodging holes and flying timber."

On the motorcycling motordromes, the situation was also very dangerous and the danger was aggravated by the riders' lack of proper safety equipment. Fans sat above the top of the track, looking down at the racers. When a rider lost control, he could slip up off the track and into the crowd. Many fatalities occurred, often involving spectators. The Nutley Velodrome at Nutley, New Jersey, a 1/8 mi (200 m) oval banked at 45 degrees (generating lap times of 8 seconds or less) and built from 1 in × 12 in (25 mm × 300 mm) lumber on edge, was "unquestionably the deadliest". On September 8, 1912, "Texas Cyclone" Eddie Hasha was killed at a motordrome in Newark, New Jersey in an accident which also killed another racer and four spectators, and injured ten more. The deaths made the front page of The New York Times, and the press started calling the short 1/4 and 1/3 mile circuits "murderdromes". The 1913 motorcycle championship races were moved to a dirt track because dirt was safer. The national organization overseeing motorcycle racing banned all competitions on board tracks shorter than 1-mile (1.6 km) in 1919. One by one, the manufacturers withdrew their support due to the negative publicity.

== The end of board tracks ==
A major contributor to the demise of board tracks was the high cost of maintenance. There was no suitable wood preservative available, and depending on climate, tracks needed new boards every five years on average. Resurfacing required as much as a million board feet of new lumber per 1.25 miles (2.01 km) of track, which would have cost around $125,000 at the prices prevalent at the time. Thus, during the last decade of the board tracks, carpenters would repair the tracks from below, sometimes even during a race, while the cars raced overhead at 120 mph (190 km/h) or faster.

An additional factor was that as speeds increased, overtaking became more difficult - the fastest car would almost always win the race, as long as it held together long enough to finish. This led to spectators turning their attention to the less-predictable racing that was taking place on dirt tracks.

Though board tracks disappeared from the National Championship scene in 1932, a few smaller tracks did continue to operate for some years afterward. For instance, the Coney Island Velodrome hosted midget racing until at least 1939, and Castle Hill Speedway in the Bronx ran midgets into the 1940s.

== See also ==
- Centrifugal force
- Plank road
- Sport venue
- Superelevation
- Velodrome
