= Charlotte Speedway (board track) =

Motorsport track in the United States

- Location: Pineville, North Carolina
- Coordinates: 35.098°N 80.888°W
- Opened: October 25, 1924
- Closed: September 19, 1927
- Construction cost: $380,000
- Major events: AAA Champ Car

Oval
- Surface: Wood
- Length: 1.25 mi (2.01 km)
- Banking: 40°

Charlotte Speedway was a wooden board track in Pineville, North Carolina, near Charlotte. It operated from 1924 to 1927, hosting AAA national championship trail races.

== History ==
Financed by local businessmen, the speedway cost $380,000. Nearly 30,000 spectators attended the inaugural event in October 1924, which was won by Tommy Milton. A fatal accident had occurred in practice for the 250-mile race when Ernie Ansterburg lost control of his car at 106 miles per hour (171 km/h).

The May 1925 event drew 55,000 people, but attendance figures had dwindled to 7,500 by November 1926 when the AAA national championship trail visited the track for the third time that season. The final races were held in September 1927. Today, the Southland Industrial Park is situated at the former site of the racing plant, which Charlotte Motor Speedway has replaced as the area's predominant racing venue.
