= Rockingham Park =

Defunct horse racing track in the U.S. state of New Hampshire

Coordinates: 42°46′17″N 71°13′36″W

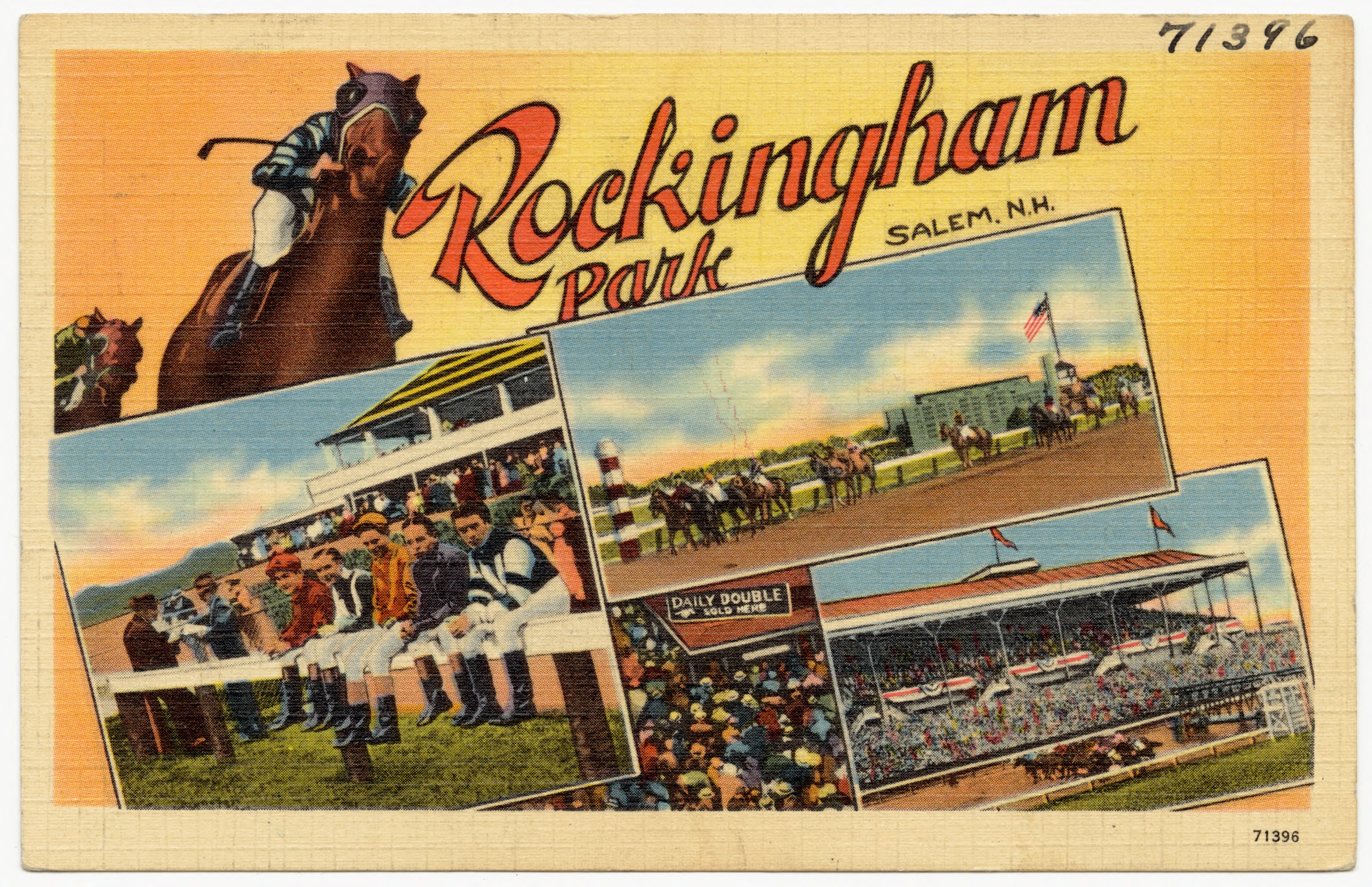
Rockingham Park on a postcard

Rockingham Park was a 1-mile (1.6 km) horse racing establishment in Salem, New Hampshire, in the United States. Notable horses to run at Rockingham Park included Seabiscuit, who raced there in 1935 and 1936, and Mom's Command, who ran in her first race and gained her first victory there in 1984.

== History ==
On June 28, 1906, a tiny outpost near the Salem train depot began a 21-day tenure as host to a Thoroughbred meet. Over 10,000 people from as far away as New York City flocked to the small New Hampshire town. Their rave reviews proclaimed the site "the finest racecourse in the world". Although Alyth, a two-year-old, won the first Thoroughbred race at the site, gambling was still illegal at the time in New Hampshire, and betting was shut down after three days. Underground wagering continued throughout the meet, but the track sat idle for five years after the meet's conclusion; however, these humble beginnings would lead to the formation of a staple of New England culture rich with the history of the "sport of kings."

In between its stints as a racecourse, the site served as host to a number of historical occurrences. Before the return of racing, Rockingham Park hosted the first aviation meet in northern New England in 1911, where Lieutenant Milling set a new altitude record of 1,600 feet (490 m) in his biplane.

The track served as the base for the 14th United States Army Corps of Engineers during World War I. The racecourse served as a bivouac for soldiers prior to voyages to France.

The New Hampshire Sweepstakes (now New Hampshire Lottery) was originated in 1964 and raced here from 1964 to 1967. The race was brought back in 1984 (though not connected with sweepstakes tickets) and was the feature event of the summer racing meet.

In 1973, New Hampshire native and popular local jockey Henry Wajda died as the result of a racing accident at Rockingham Park. Riding Zabush on July 28, 1973, Wajda fell from his mount after his right stirrup broke at the start of a race; he was kicked by the horse, and suffered a punctured lung. He died the next day following surgery in Methuen, Massachusetts.

The racetrack was idled again when on July 29, 1980, a fire destroyed the grandstand. The track remained closed until May 26, 1984.

Tom and Joe Carney, along with their partners Edward Keelan and Max Hugel (operating as Rockingham Venture Inc.), bought Rockingham Park on August 22, 1983. They purchased the Salem, New Hampshire track for $12.5 million following a devastating fire and successfully reopened it in 1984.

The Carney family and their partners invested over $20 million to rebuild a state-of-the-art facility. They converted the old harness track into a brand-new turf course, paving the way for high-class thoroughbred racing.

Mom's Command Debut (July 17, 1984): One of the most famous early moments after the reopening was the debut of owner Peter Fuller’s champion filly, Mom's Command, who shocked the crowd by winning and paying out $91 to win.

The New England Classic (July 20, 1991): The newly constructed turf course eventually hosted "The New England Classic". This $500,000 stakes race was part of the American Championship Racing Series and featured the largest purse in New England history at the time. Broadcast nationally on ABC, it was won by Bobby Frankel's legendary horse, Marquetry

In 1991, The Mall at Rockingham Park, which became the largest mall in northern New England, was constructed adjacent to the racetrack; owned and managed by Simon Property Group, it was not affiliated with the racetrack.

Rockingham Park also hosted simulcasting and charity gaming. The last live horse racing at the track occurred in 2009. Rockingham Park closed its doors for good on August 31, 2016, and was sold for redevelopment of the property. The racetrack was demolished in the summer of 2017. It was redeveloped as part of the Tuscan Village project.

=== Motor racing venue ===
The establishment also hosted motorized racing. On July 4, 1925, the track was used for a 100-mile (160 km) race with an average speed of 76.8 miles per hour (123.6 km/h). Motorcycle races were also held. With the success of the events, a 1.25-mile (2.01 km) board track was built, sanctioned by the AAA, the most recognized sanctioning body of the day. A mechanic was killed in practice for the 250-mile (400 km) Autumn Classic car race, which was staged on October 31, 1925. On August 21, 1926, M. L. "Curly" Fredericks, on an Altoona, set the record for the fastest speed (120.3 miles per hour [193.6 km/h]) that a motorcycle would attain on an oval board track. In 1928, the track held the final motorcycle national championships to be competed on a board track. With the rotten wood removed, the 1929 Labor Day and Columbus Day auto races held at the restored dirt track drew 45,000 and 52,000 spectators, respectively.
