= Harry Miller (auto racing) =

American race car designer and builder

Harold Arminius Miller
- Miller in 1932
- Born: Harold Arminius Miller; December 9, 1875; Menomonie, Wisconsin, U.S.
- Died: May 3, 1943 (aged 67); Detroit, Michigan, U.S.
- Known for: Harry A. Miller Manufacturing Company
- Spouse: Edna Inez Lewis
- Awards: Motorsports Hall of Fame; Automotive Hall of Fame

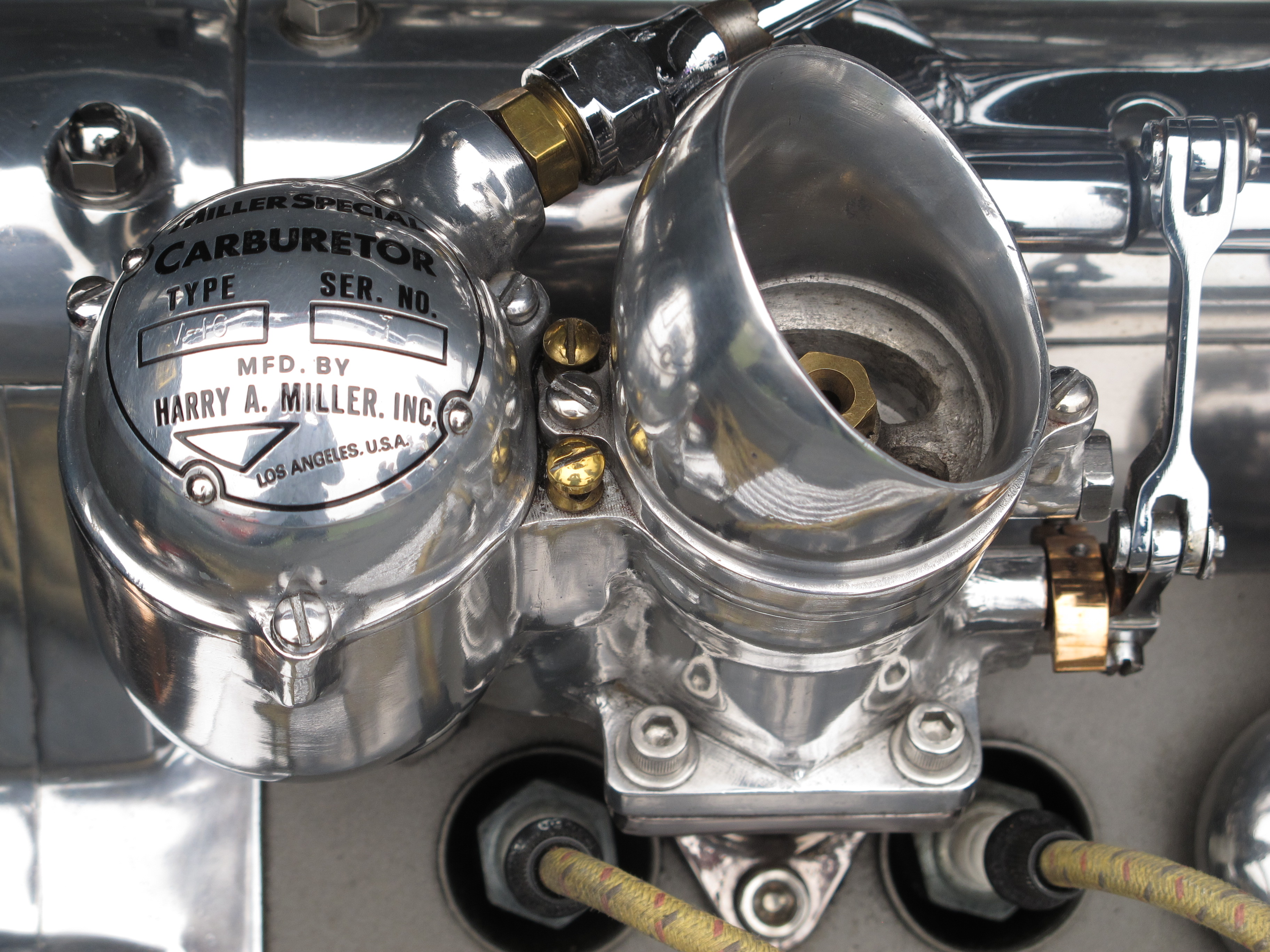
A Miller carburetor

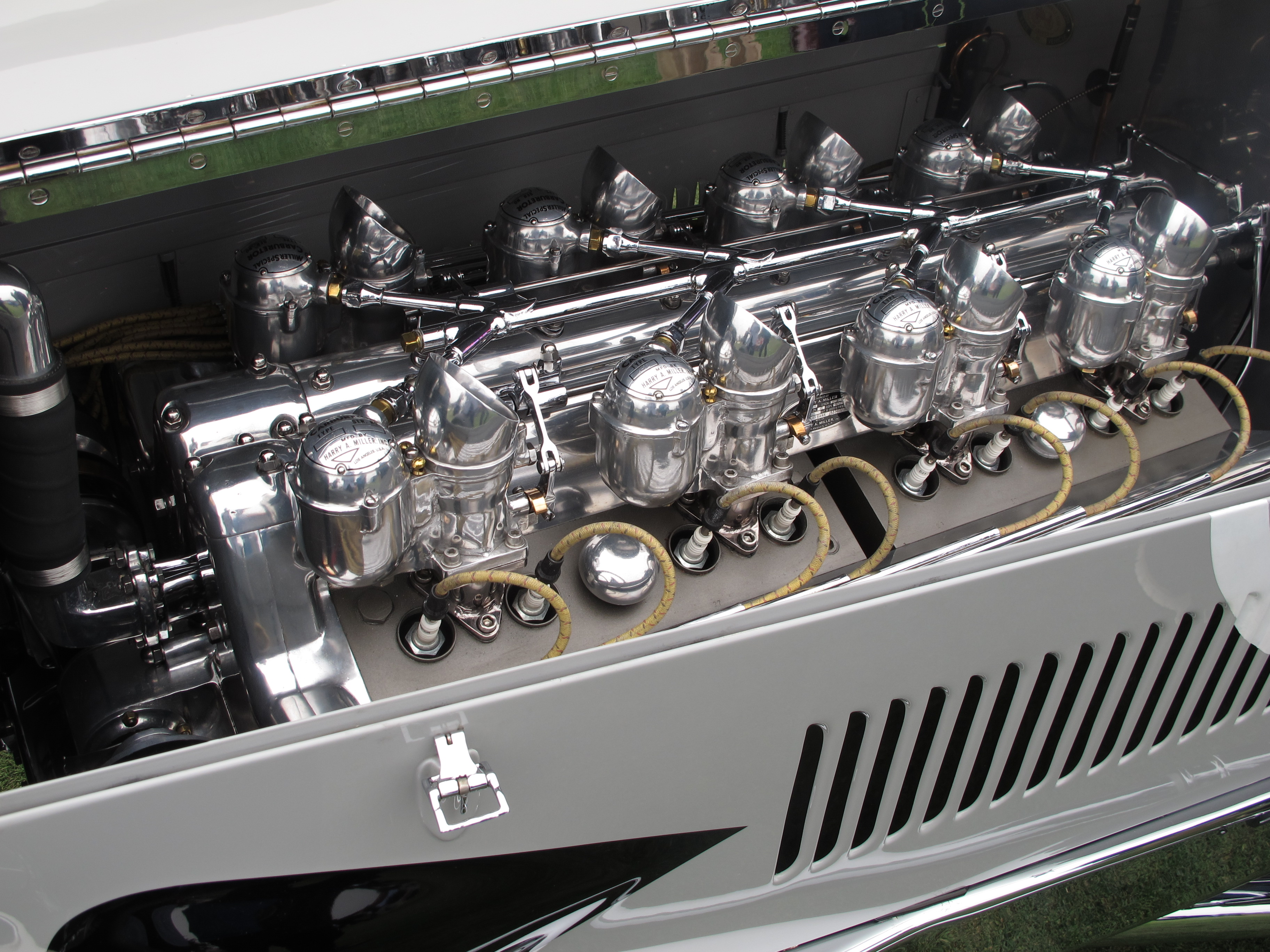
The Miller eight cylinder racing engine

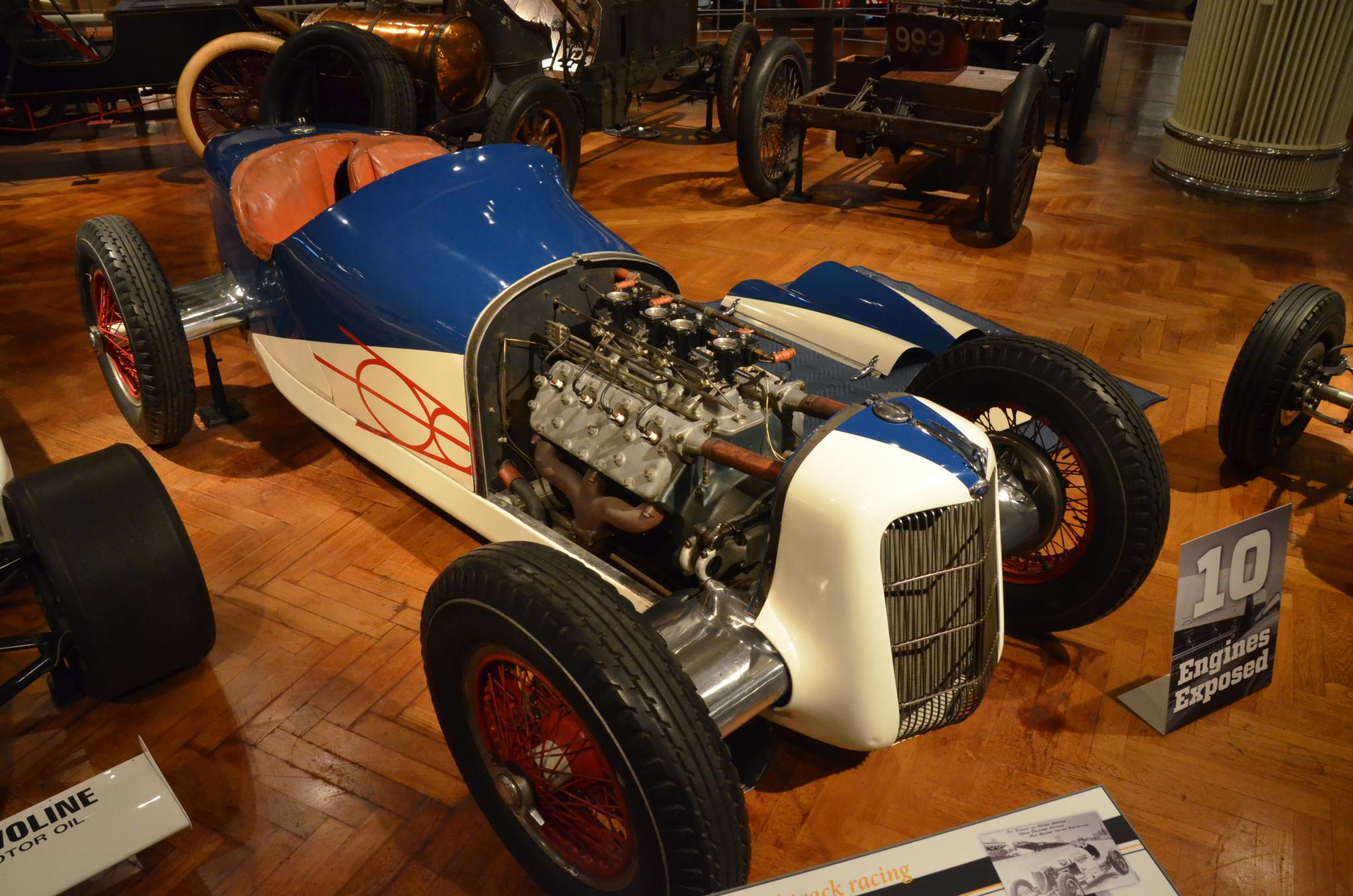
The 1935 Miller IndyCar chassis was the first to use a Ford engine

Harold Arminius Miller (December 9, 1875 – May 3, 1943) was an American race car designer and builder who was most active in the 1920s and 1930s. Griffith Borgeson called him "the greatest creative figure in the history of the American racing car". Cars built by Miller won the Indianapolis 500 nine times, and other cars using his engines won three more. Millers accounted for 83% of the Indy 500 fields between 1923 and 1928.

== Biography ==
Miller was born on December 9, 1875, in Menomonie, Wisconsin, to Jacob Miller (1833–1900) and Martha Ann (Tuttle) Miller (c1835–1922).

Miller's first work in the automotive business was with the short-lived Yale Automobile Company. From Yale he moved to Lansing, Michigan, to work for motoring pioneer Ransom E. Olds at Oldsmobile, where he was employed as a race mechanic during the early Vanderbilt cup races. After a poor 1906 race season, Miller left for Los Angeles, California, to open a small machine shop specializing in carburetor production.

Among Miller's innovations include his involvement with the first outboard motor. Miller built a 4 cylinder engine and mounted it on a boat. His neighbor, Ole Evinrude, removed two cylinders and patented the first outboard motor. Miller also produced the first aluminum pistons, developed the aluminum alloys still used in engine development today, and the first carburetors and induction system to use Helmholtz resonators.

His involvement with the racing side of his carburetor business led first to repairing and then building race cars. In the 1910s, Miller was making $1 million per year through sales of his carburetors. In the early 1920s, he built his own 3.0 litre (183 in³) engine. Inspired by multiple engine designs including Duesenberg and Peugeot engines which had been serviced in his shop, it had 4 cylinders, dual overhead camshafts and 4 valves per cylinder. Tommy Milton supplied the financial backing to produce this engine but it was Jimmy Murphy who first won with it. It powered Jimmy Murphy's Duesenberg to victory in the 1922 Indianapolis 500.

Miller then progressed to building Miller single-seater race cars that used supercharged versions of his 2.0 and 1.5 liter (122 and 91 in³) engines. The engines took four more wins in the 500 up to 1929, twice (1926 and 1928) in Miller chassis, and won the race another seven times between 1929 and 1938 (twice again, in 1930 and 1932, in Miller chassis).

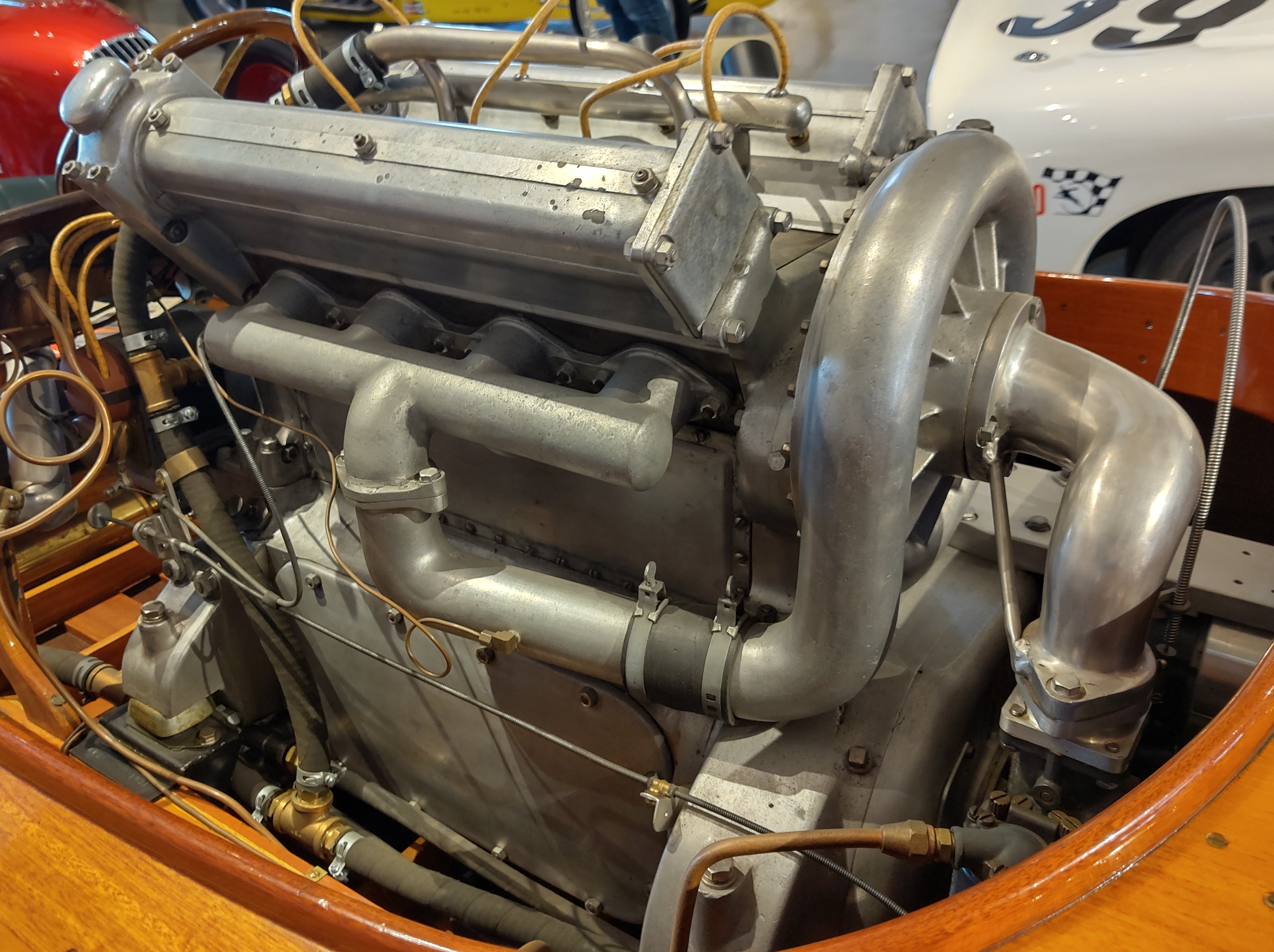
A Miller 151 cu.in. 4 cylinder marine engine. Note the large centrifugal supercharger

In the 1920s and 1930s, Miller engines also powered speedboats to several race wins and world water speed records. Among those that won with his engines on the water was the great Gar Wood.

Miller declared bankruptcy in 1933. His shop foreman and chief machinist Fred Offenhauser purchased the business and continued development of the engine as the Offenhauser which raced successfully until the 1980s.

After bankruptcy, Miller built race cars with Indianapolis 500 enthusiast Preston Tucker, and in 1935 they formed Miller and Tucker, Inc., whose first job was to build ten modified Ford V-8 racers for Henry Ford. With insufficient time available for their development and testing, all these cars dropped out when the steering boxes, installed too close to the exhaust, overheated and locked up. The design was later perfected by privateers, and examples ran at Indianapolis through 1948.

Miller and Tucker, Inc., moved to Indianapolis and continued race car development and construction. In the late 1930s, Miller and Tucker also developed the Tucker Combat Car and tried unsuccessfully to sell it to the Dutch and U.S. governments. The car was capable of 115 mph (185 km/h) on pavement and 65 mph (105 km/h) on rough terrain, and had several innovative features including a power-operated gun turret, which the U.S. government bought and used in numerous applications including the B-17 and B-29, PT boats, and landing craft.

The Miller 122 racing car

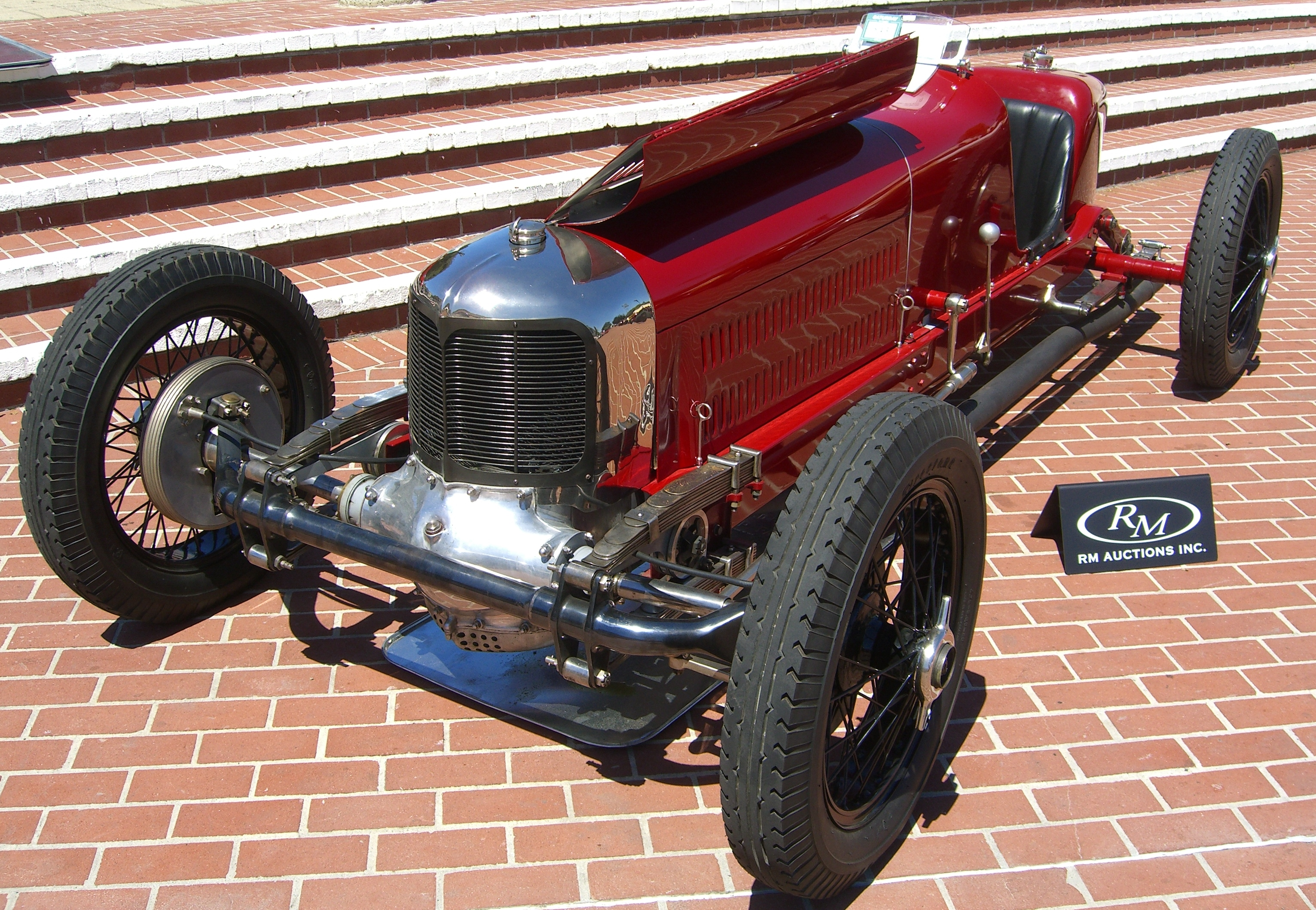
1925 Indianapolis front wheel drive racer

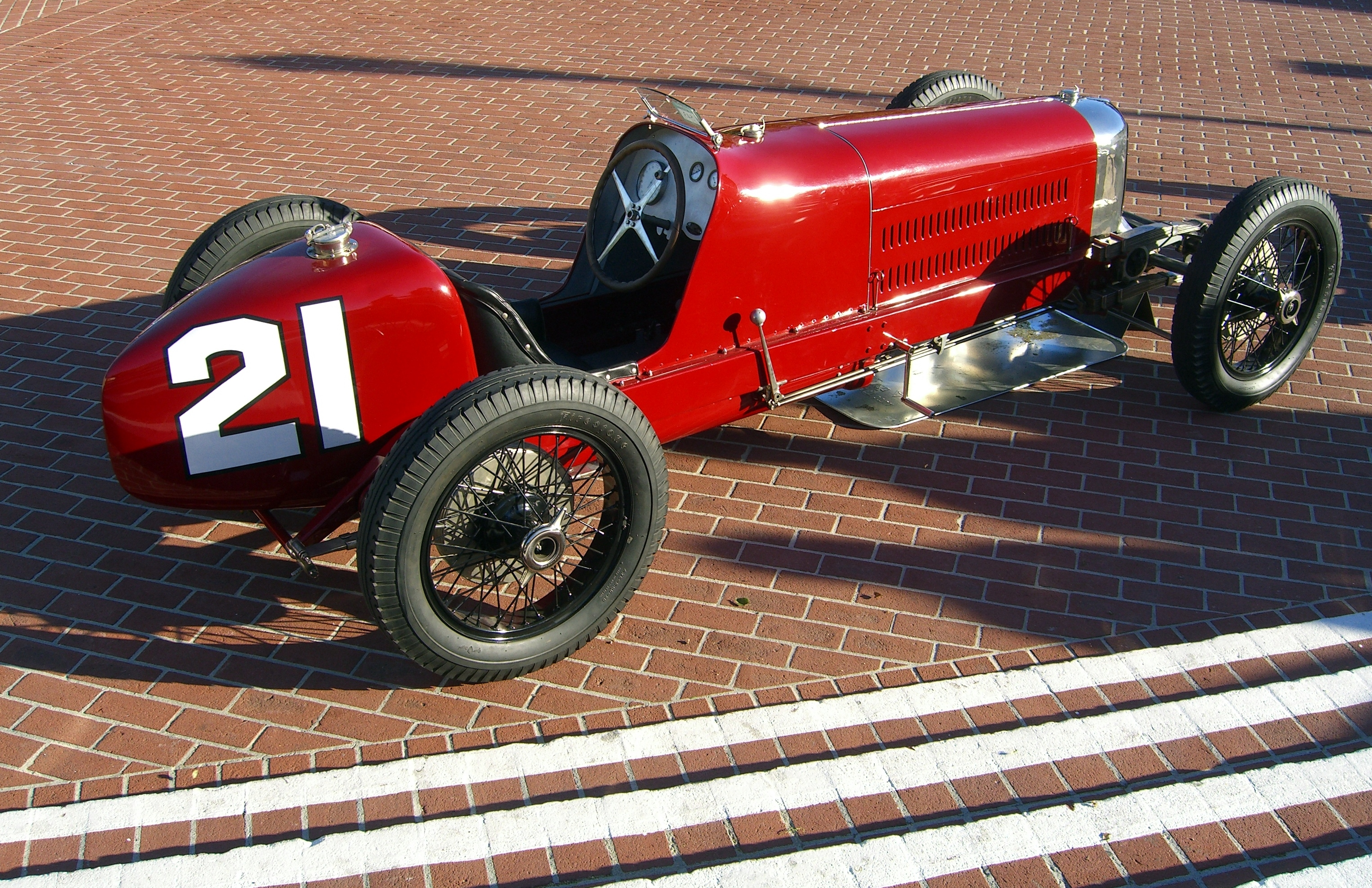
1925 Indianapolis front wheel drive racer

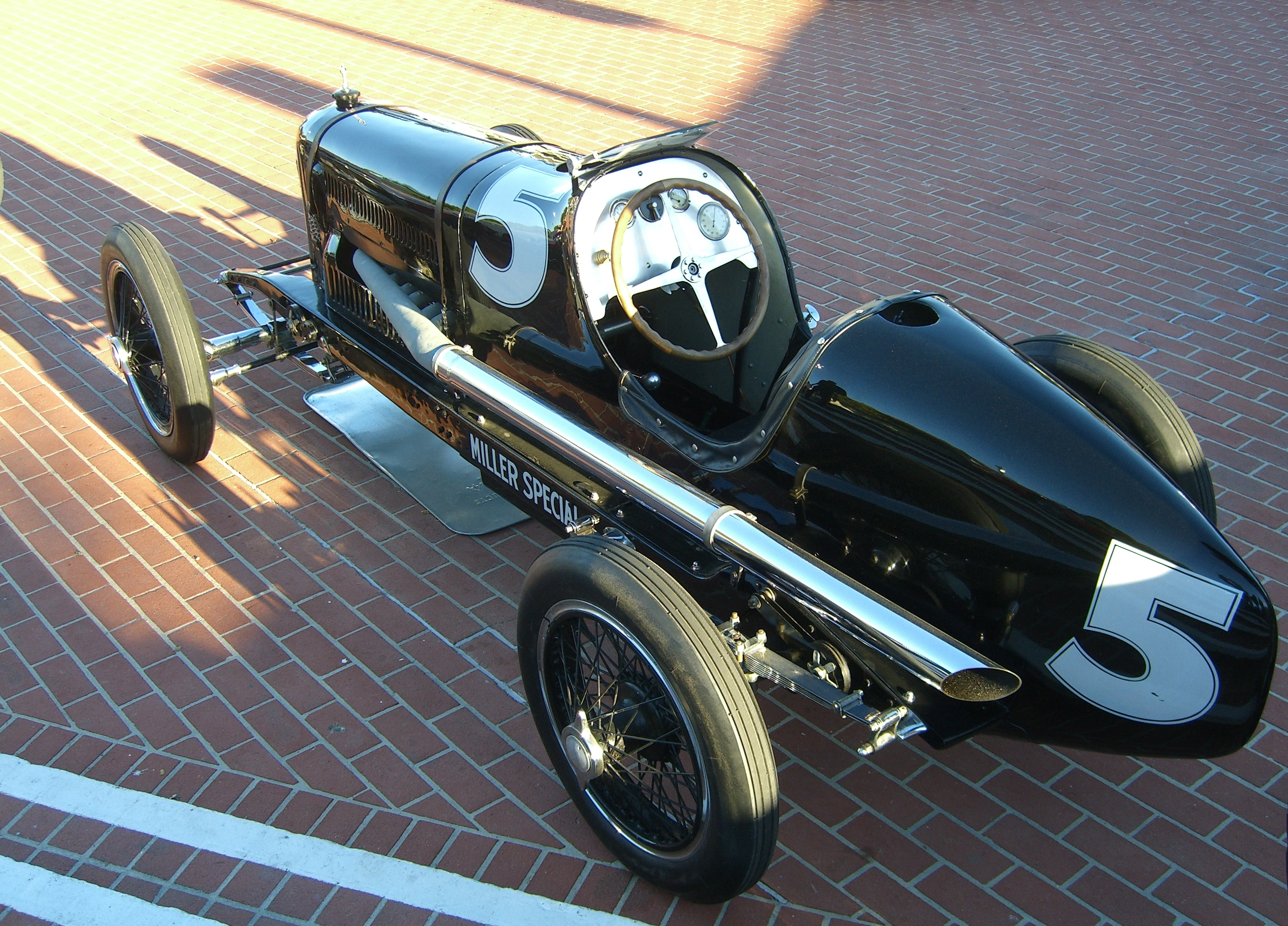
1924 Miller 122/183 "Convertible" (designed to be converted quickly from one engine to another) ran at 151.26 mph, at Muroc Dry Lake

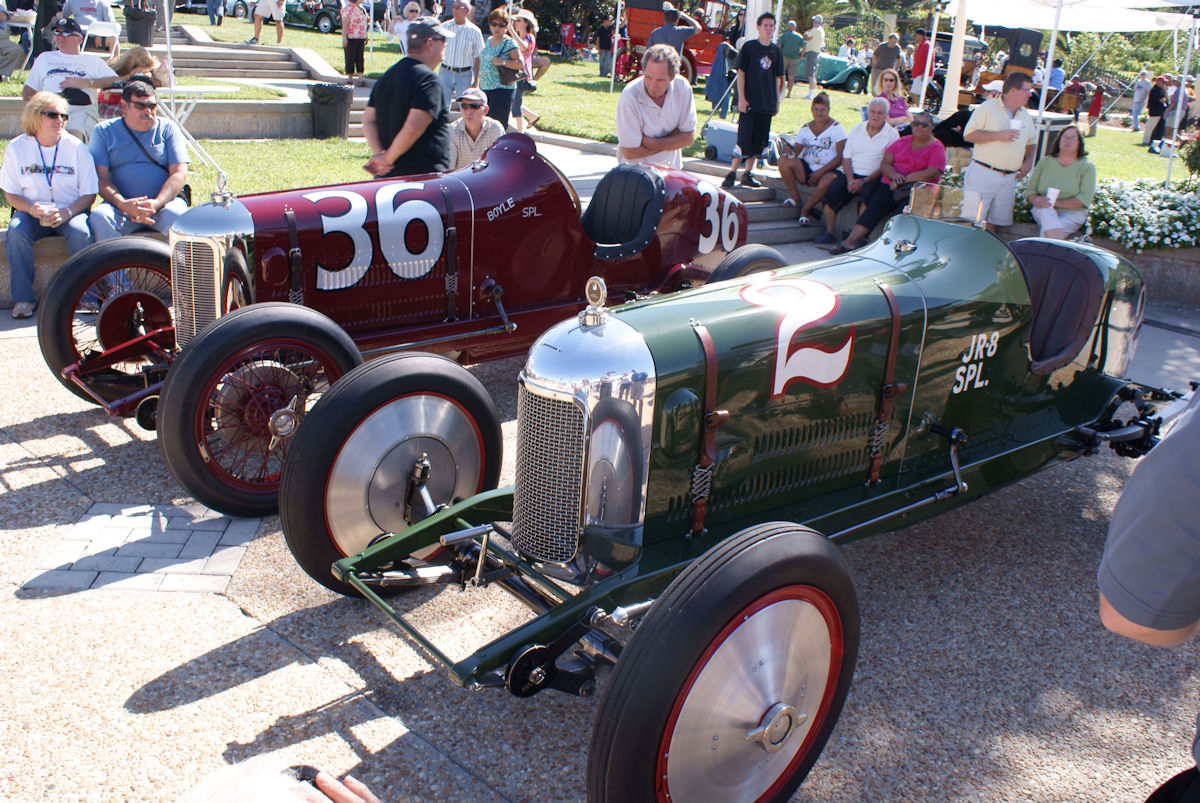
1922 Miller 122 Boyle Special

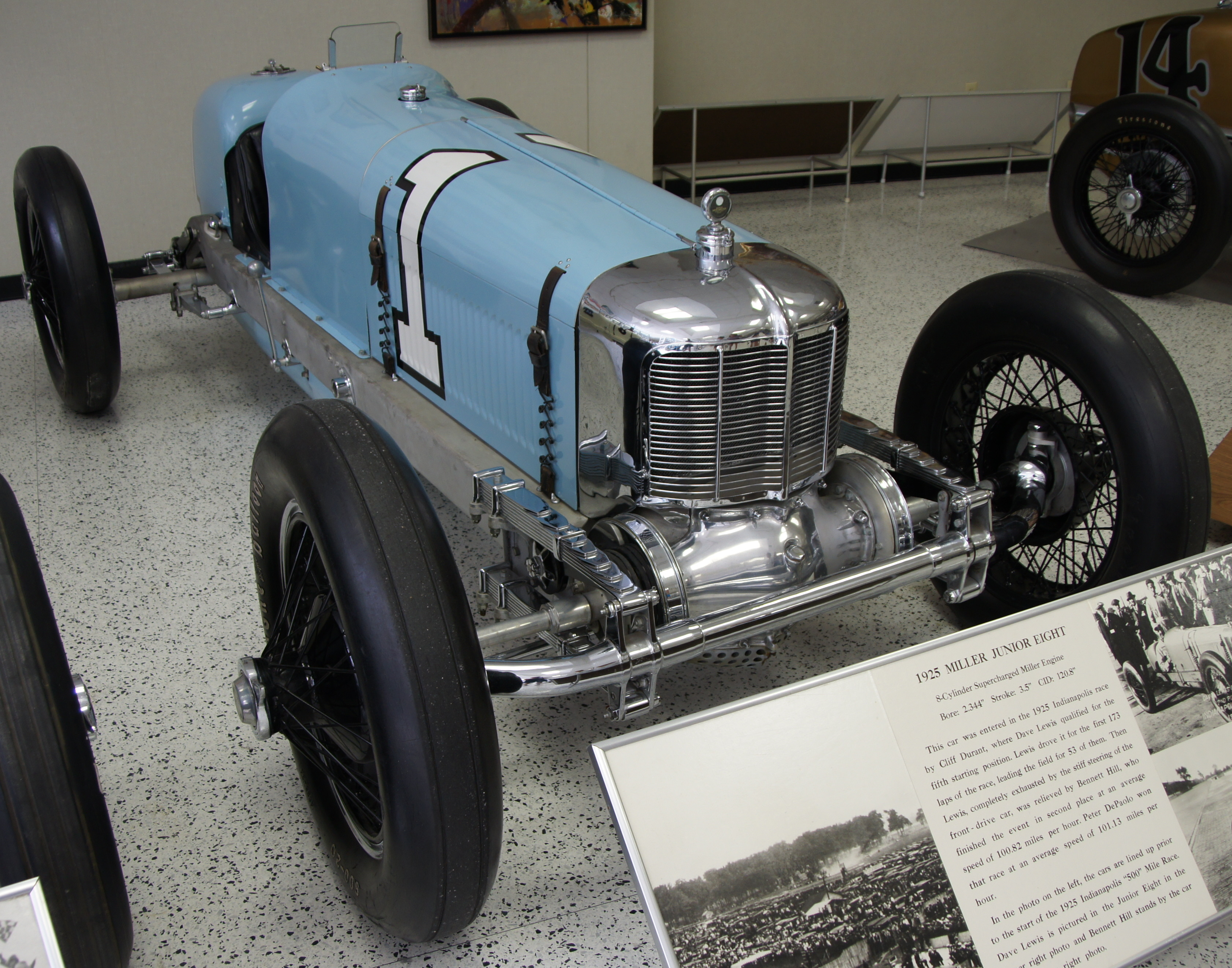
1925 Miller Junior Eight

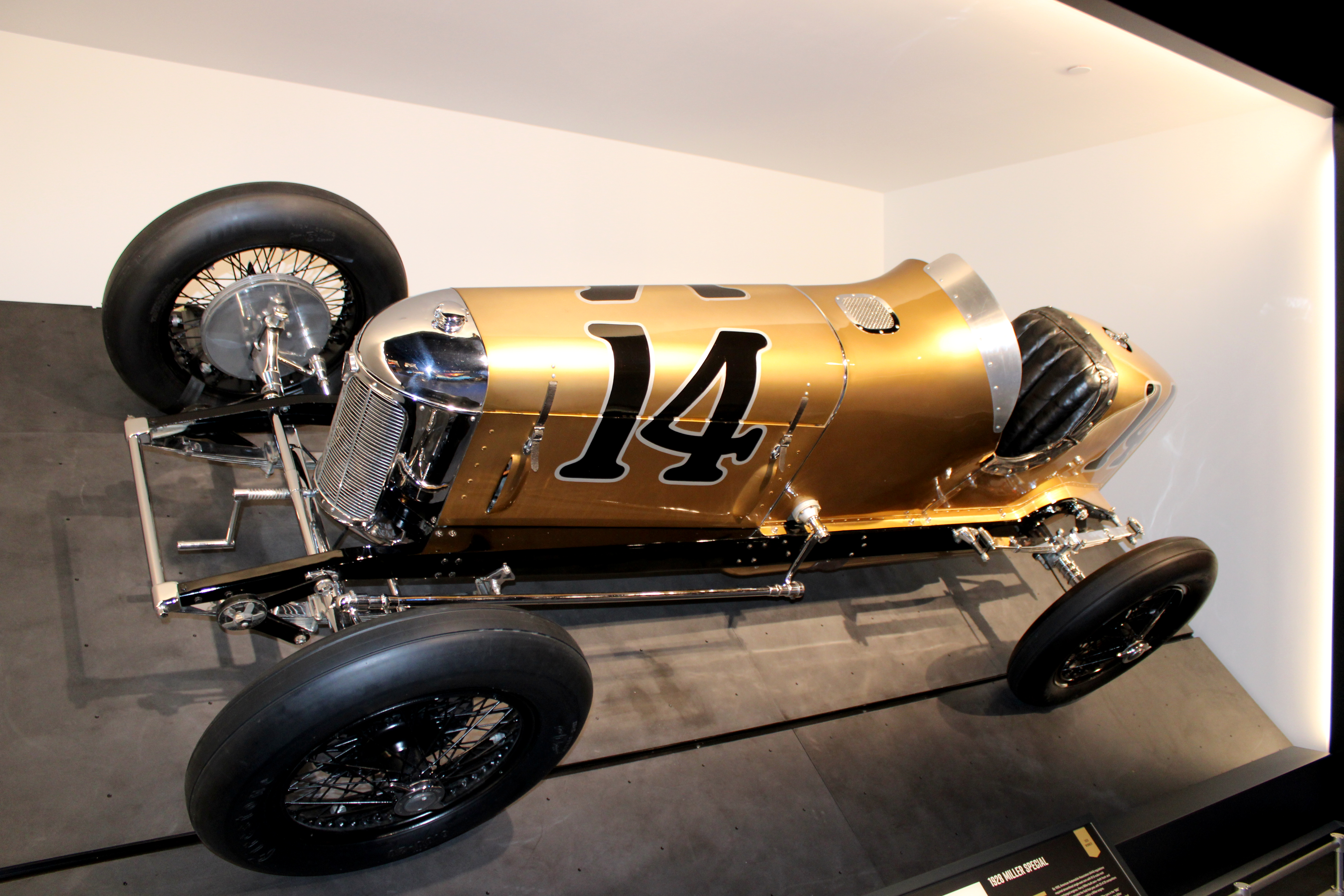
1928 Miller Special

Miller took some of the design elements from the Tucker Combat Car, notably the suspension, to American Bantam, where he was involved with the development of the first Jeep.

Tucker and Miller worked together off and on until Miller's death in 1943. Tucker helped Miller's widow pay the funeral costs. It was while working with Miller that Tucker had met chief mechanic John Eddie Offutt, who would later help him develop and build the first prototype of the 1948 Tucker Sedan.

Miller died on May 3, 1943, at Grace Hospital in Detroit, Michigan, at age 67.

== Awards ==
- He was named to the National Sprint Car Hall of Fame in 1990.
- He was inducted into the Motorsports Hall of Fame of America in 1999.
- He was inducted into the Automotive Hall of Fame in 2003.

== Tribute ==
Miller was honored at the 1993 Monterey Historic Automobile Races
