= Battersby (surname) =

Battersby is an English surname. It is a toponymic surname based on Battersby, North Yorkshire. Notable people with this surname include:

- Sir Alan Battersby (1925–2018), British organic chemist
- Ashley Battersby (born 1988), American professional skier
- Bradley Battersby (born 1953), American film director and screenwriter
- Christine Battersby (born 1946), British philosopher
- Edmund Battersby (1949–2016), American classical pianist
- Eileen Battersby, chief literary critic of The Irish Times
- James Battersby (born 1958), Australian rower
- James Johnson Battersby (1875–1949), British hat manufacturer
- James Larratt Battersby (1907–1955), British fascist and pacifist
- Jean Battersby (1928–2009), Australian arts executive
- Lee Battersby (born 1970), Australian author
- Martin Battersby (1914–1982), British trompe l'oeil artist and theatrical set decorator
- Mary Battersby (fl. 1801–1841), Irish artist and naturalist.
- Matthew Battersby (1841–1899), Australian politician
- Robert Battersby (1924–2002), British soldier, linguist, diplomat and politician
- Roy Battersby (1936–2024), British TV director
- Sydney Battersby (1887–1974), English swimmer
- Terence Battersby (1893–1972), English cricketer and British Army officer
- Tim Battersby (born 1949), English composer and performer of children's music
- Tony Battersby (born 1975), English footballer
- William John Battersby (1839–1915), British hat manufacturer

== Fictional characters ==
From Coronation Street:

- Cilla Battersby-Brown
- Janice Battersby
- Leanne Battersby
- Les Battersby
- Toyah Battersby

== See also ==
- Archie Battersbee (2010–2022), English schoolboy, subject of the Archie Battersbee case
- Thomas Battersbee (1791–1865), schoolmaster and English cricketer
