= W. G. Barlow =

British racing driver and fascist

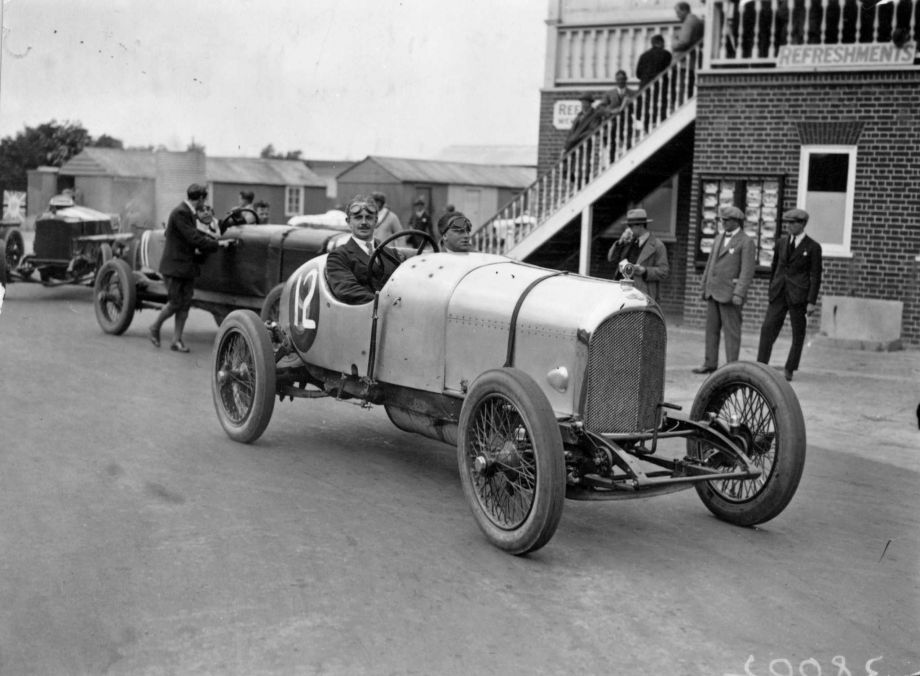
W. G. Barlow in a Bentley at Brooklands, August 1922.

Lieutenant William Geoffrey Barlow (28 December 1891 – 19 January 1975) was a Royal Flying Corps pilot during the First World War, a racing driver in the 1920s, and a fascist before and after the Second World War. He was detained by the British government under Defence Regulation 18B during the Second World War.

== Family and personal life ==
Barlow was born at Ashford, Wilmslow, Cheshire, the son of barrister William Wycliffe Barlow and Emily Jardine Barlow. The family home was Pitt Manor in Winchester. In 1925, he married Dora Naomi Elizabeth Bayford.

He died on 19 January 1975 in Bridport, Dorset.

== First World War ==
During the First World War, Barlow served as a Second Lieutenant with the 28th London Regiment and as a pilot with the Royal Flying Corps as a Lieutenant.

== Motor racing ==
In the early 1920s, Barlow was a regular competitor at the Brooklands motor racing circuit. In 1920, he drove an ex-Tuck Humber in the August bank holiday event. In August 1922, he was pictured in a Bentley. In 1923, he competed in a Halford Special at least three times. He also raced an Aston Martin.

== Fascism ==
Barlow joined Oswald Mosley's British Union of Fascists (BUF) sometime before the Second World War. During the war, he was one of those detained by the British government under the newly introduced Defence Regulation 18B.

After the end of the war, Barlow was a worshipper and the financial backer of the religious community known as Kingdom House, at River, West Sussex, where they worshiped Adolf Hitler as Christ returned. According to information given to Brian Simpson by Robert Row, the worshipers also included James Larratt Battersby, Captain Thomas Baker MC, and A.J. Schneider.
