= Conty =

- Commune
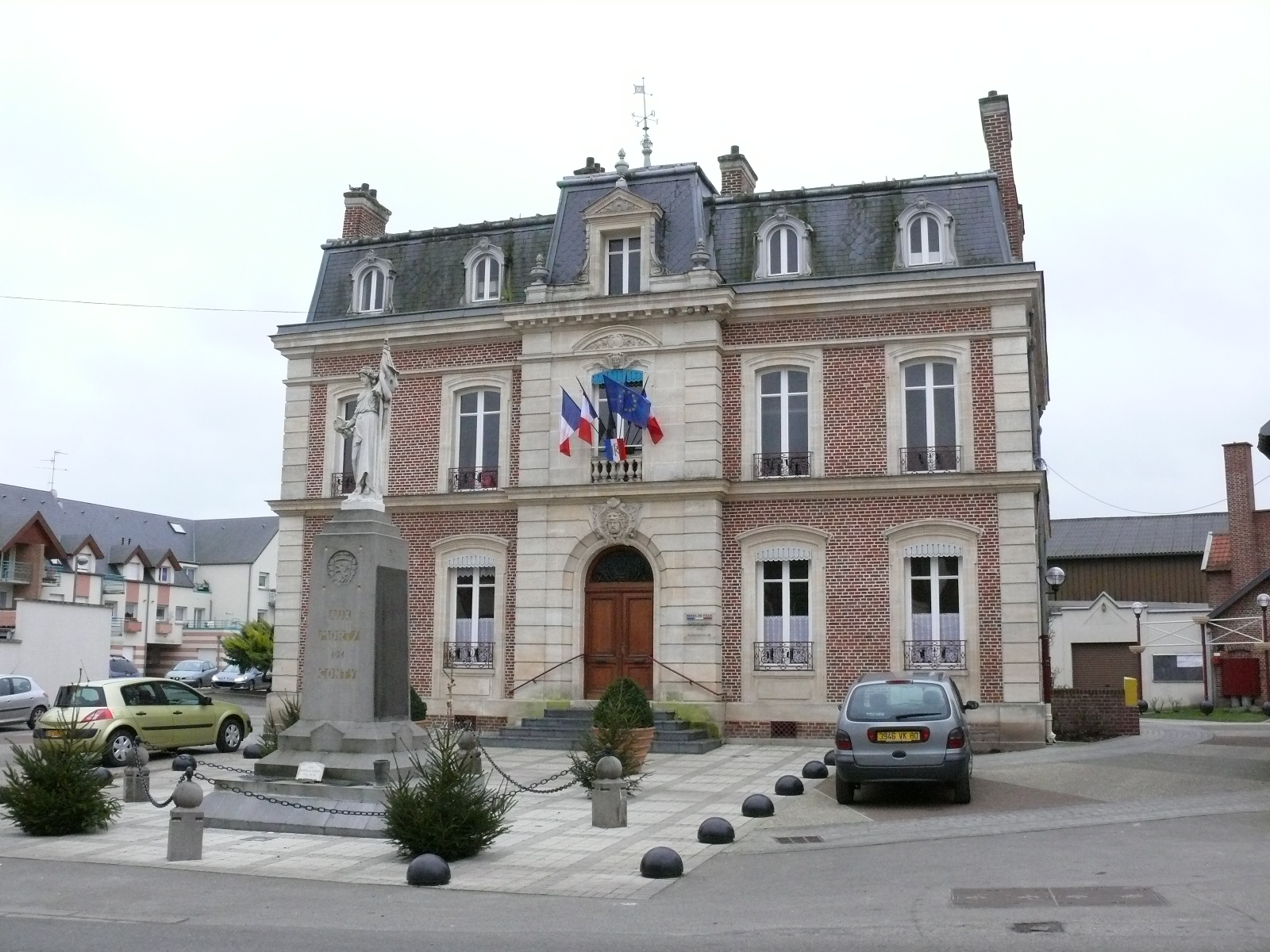
- Town hall

- Coat of arms
- Location of Conty
- Location within France Location within Hauts-de-France
- Coordinates: 49°44′29″N 2°09′09″E
- Country: France
- Region: Hauts-de-France
- Department: Somme
- Arrondissement: Amiens
- Canton: Ailly-sur-Noye
- Intercommunality: CC Somme Sud-Ouest

Government
  - Mayor (2020–2026): Pascal Bohin
- Area^{1}: 23.72 km^{2} (9.16 sq mi)
- Elevation: 58 m (190 ft)
- Highest elevation: 182 m (597 ft)
- Lowest elevation: 46 m (151 ft)
- Population (2023): 1,660
  - Density: 70.0/km^{2} (181/sq mi)
- Time zone: UTC+01:00 (CET)
  - Summer (DST): UTC+02:00 (CEST)
- INSEE/Postal code: 80211 /80160
- ^{1} French Land Register data, which excludes lakes, ponds, glaciers > 1 km^{2} (0.386 sq mi or 247 acres) and river estuaries.

Conty (French pronunciation: [kɔ̃ti]) is a commune in the Somme department in Hauts-de-France in northern France.

== Origin of the name ==
Conty comes from cond (confluence) (of the rivers and streams in the valley). The Princes of Conti, a minor branch of French royalty, took their name from Conty.

== Geography ==
The commune comprises the village Conty and two hamlets: Luzières and Wailly (since 1973). Situated on the D920 road, some 15 miles (24 km) southwest of Amiens. Junction 17 of the A16 autoroute is just 3 miles (5 km) away.

Nestling by the banks of the river Selle (a tributary of the Somme) that, at Conty, comprises several small branches that converge here.

== Economic and tourist activities ==
- The Ateliers du Val de Selle, created in 1970, is a centre for those artisans involved with horses, riding and carriage-driving.
- The SIC (Société industrielle de Conty), created in 1928, specialises in non-ferrous foundry work,
- The Selle sawmills.
- The Coulée verte, a public right-of-way, is used by ramblers, cyclists and riders alike. For over 10 miles, it follows part of an old railway line between Beauvais and Amiens, which closed in 1979.
- The Cabinet du Dr Dutilloy, a classic example of 20th-century French medical architecture, is worth visiting. Guided tours on request.

== Population ==
Historical population

Year	Pop.	±% p.a.
1793	710	—
1800	759	+0.96%
1806	690	−1.58%
1821	853	+1.42%
1831	857	+0.05%
1836	920	+1.43%
1841	923	+0.07%
1846	903	−0.44%
1851	958	+1.19%
1856	966	+0.17%
1861	1,007	+0.83%
1866	976	−0.62%
1872	980	+0.07%
1876	1,025	+1.13%
1881	1,097	+1.37%
1886	1,127	+0.54%
1891	1,110	−0.30%
1896	1,169	+1.04%
1901	1,329	+2.60%

Year	Pop.	±% p.a.
1906	1,284	−0.69%
1911	1,394	+1.66%
1921	1,396	+0.01%
1926	1,346	−0.73%
1931	1,276	−1.06%
1936	1,267	−0.14%
1946	1,392	+0.95%
1954	1,373	−0.17%
1962	1,463	+0.80%
1968	1,512	+0.55%
1975	1,554	+0.39%
1982	1,434	−1.14%
1990	1,541	+0.90%
1999	1,659	+0.82%
2007	1,714	+0.41%
2012	1,719	+0.06%
2017	1,735	+0.19%
2023	1,660	−0.73%

Source: EHESS and INSEE (1968-2023)

== History ==
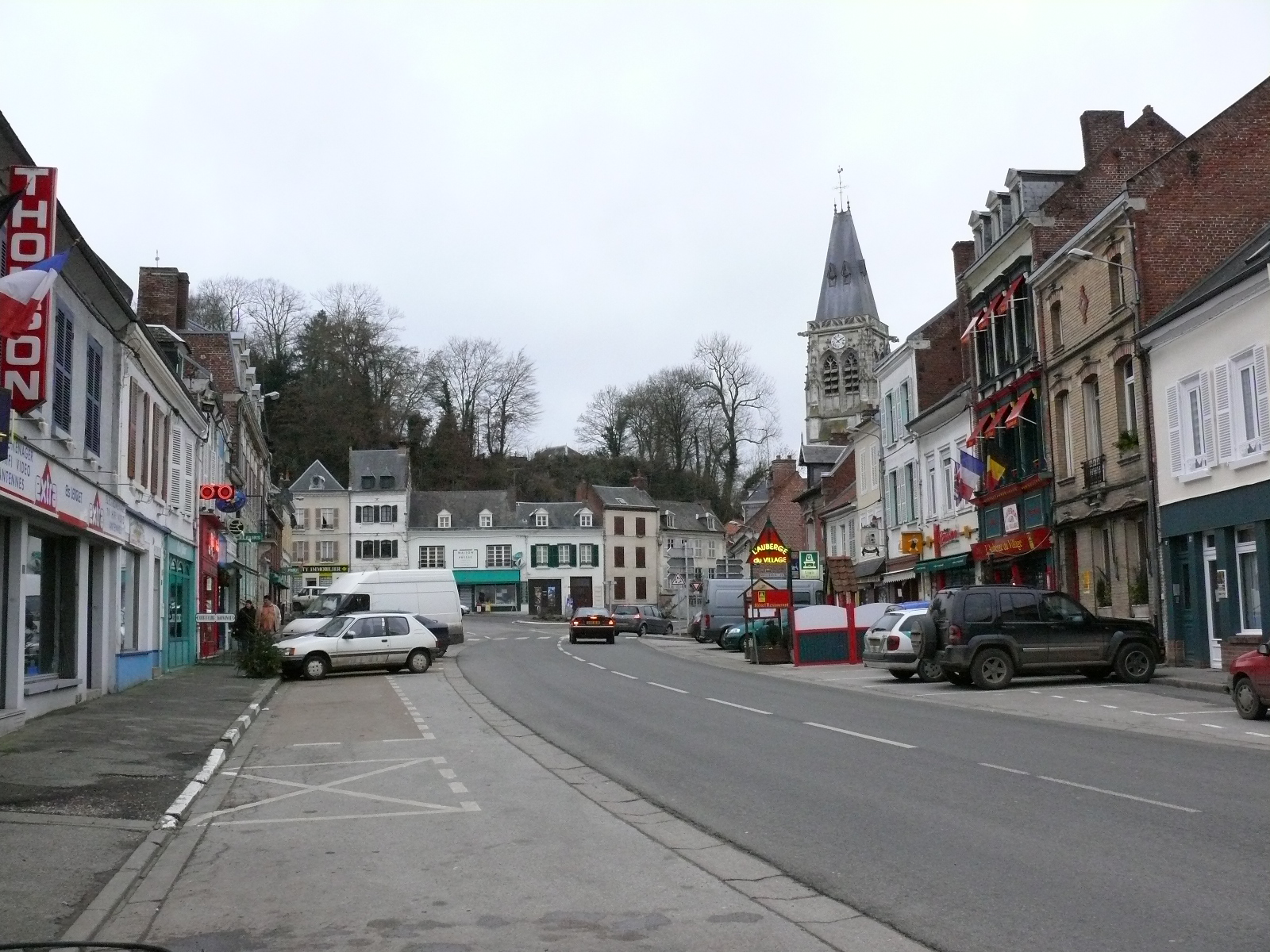
Looking towards the town square

The river, the woods and the promontory, which dominates the valley, were the contributing factors for populating the area. Recent quarrying has exposed evidence of prehistoric life in the district, in the shape of bones and tools.
Conty is on the old Roman road to Beauvais. Gallo-Roman remains have been found, in the form of burial sites.
In the 10th century, the Norman feudal system was in place at Conty. The first 'seigneur' Oger de Conty, is mentioned in 1044.
During the Middle Ages, the wars between France and its neighbours affect Conty as it did many northern French towns
In 1589, the castle was taken by the Catholic League of Amiens.
Fires burned the village down several times, in 1691, 1709, 1734, 1809, 1812, 1825 and 1827
In 1758, melting snow created a major flood throughout the town.
In 1790, because of rioting, the National guard were called to the town to restore order.
1832 and cholera breaks out. The marshy nature of the ground is blamed for the epidemic.
Around 1850, the new market hall was built, replacing an old wooden structure. Constructed of brick and roofed with slate by the architect Firmin Lombard. It was not just a market, but the council chamber, Mayor's office and a court.

In 1907, Battersby Hats, a hat manufacturer of Stockport, England, bought a second factory in Conty, and it was managed by William John Battersby's son, Ernest.

1876 saw the coming of the railway to the town. By 1939, it was closed to all but freight traffic and it shut down completely in 1979.

== Places of interest ==
- The castle

The first castle, built after the rampages of Attila the Hun around 450, was later laid waste by the Normans. Colart de Mailly rebuilt it in 1430. It was seized on 23 October 1589 by the Catholic League from Amiens, who decided to pull it down. Conty's inhabitants refused to participate in the demolition. Jehan de Morlencourt and a Captain Saint-Jean were charged with the mission by the council of Amiens. It took eight days hard work to complete the task. All that's apparent nowadays is a mound with a notice board with 'motte féodale' on it.

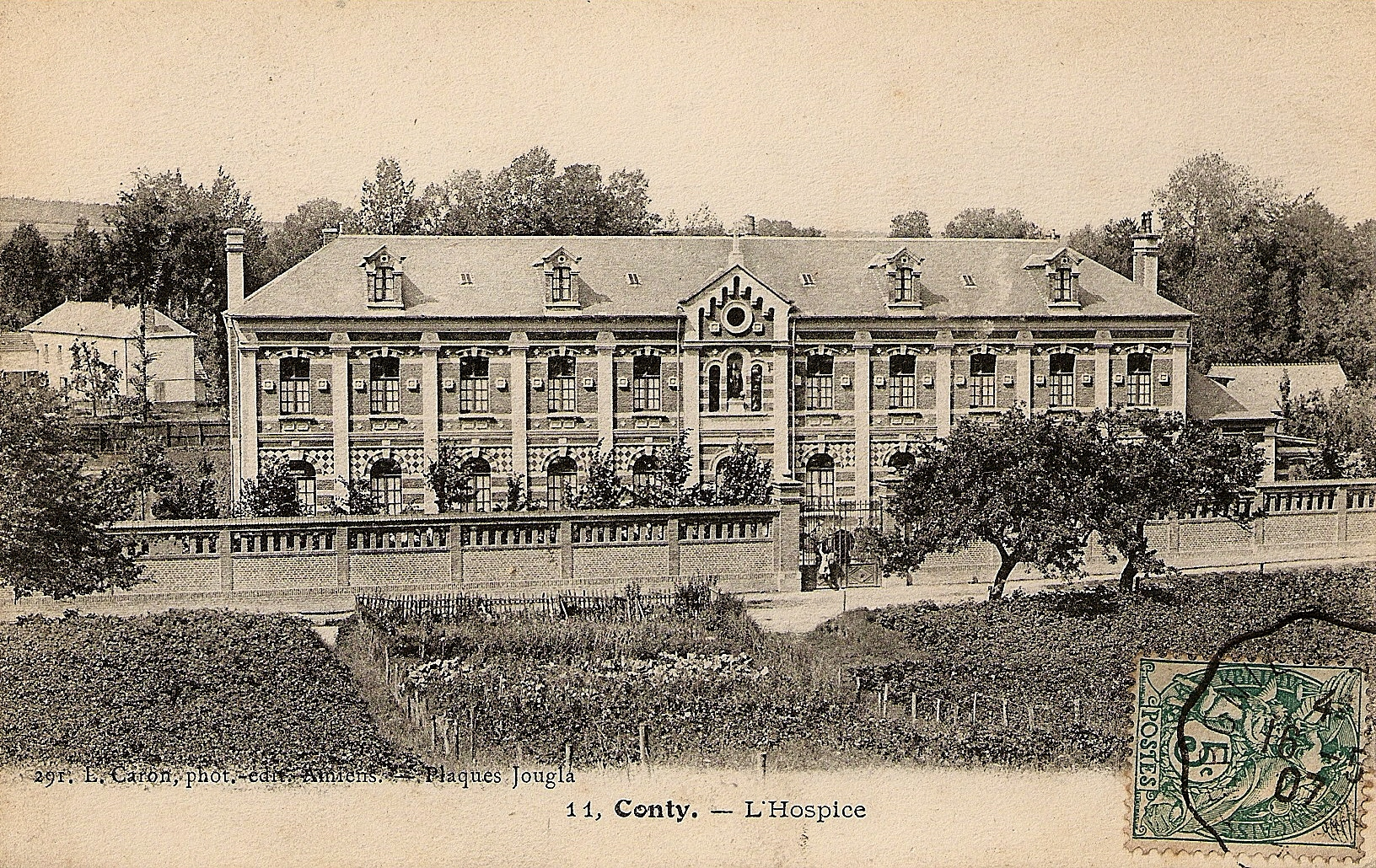
Saint-Antoine's hospice

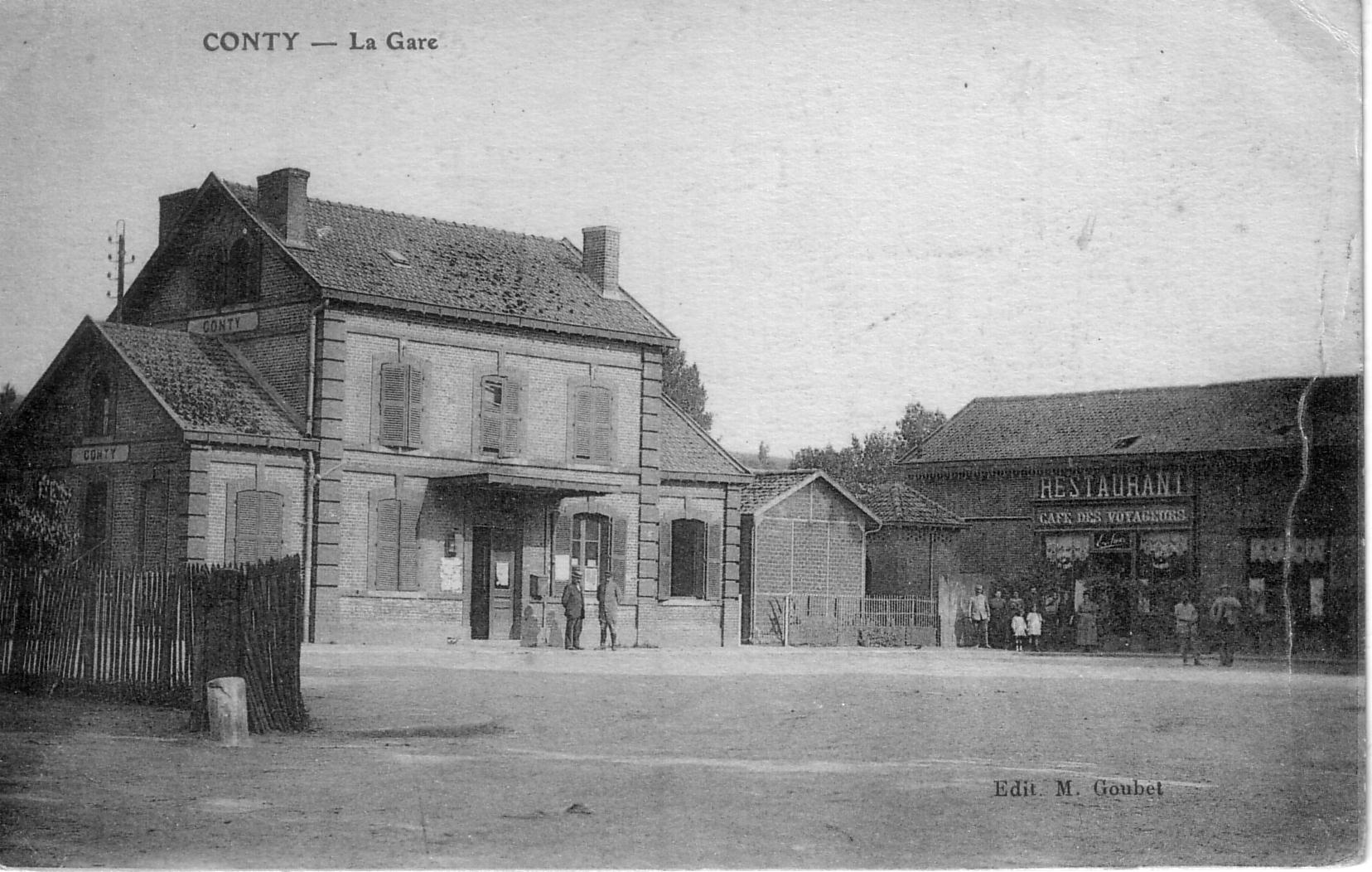
The old railway station

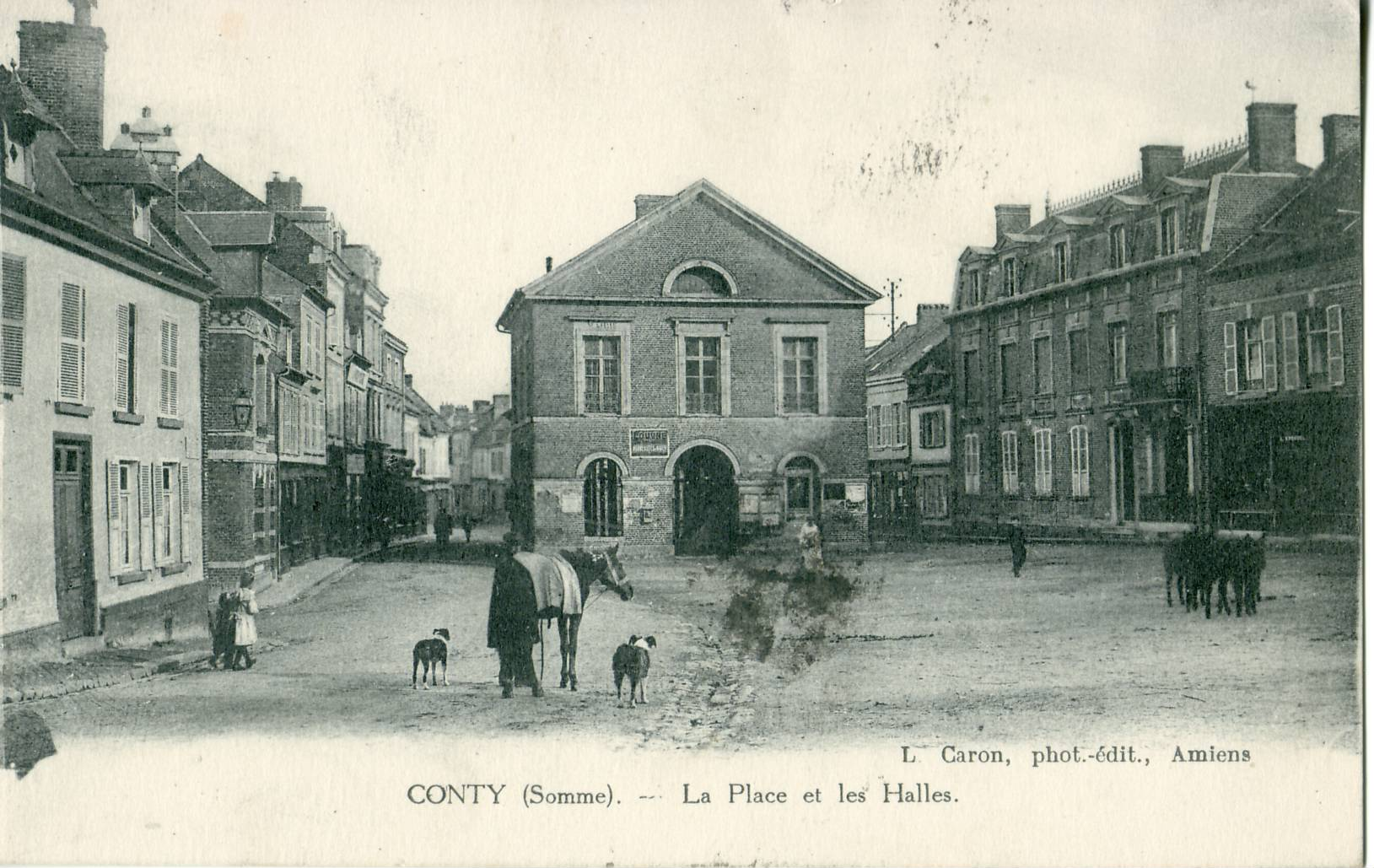
The old market building
- Church of Saint-Antoine

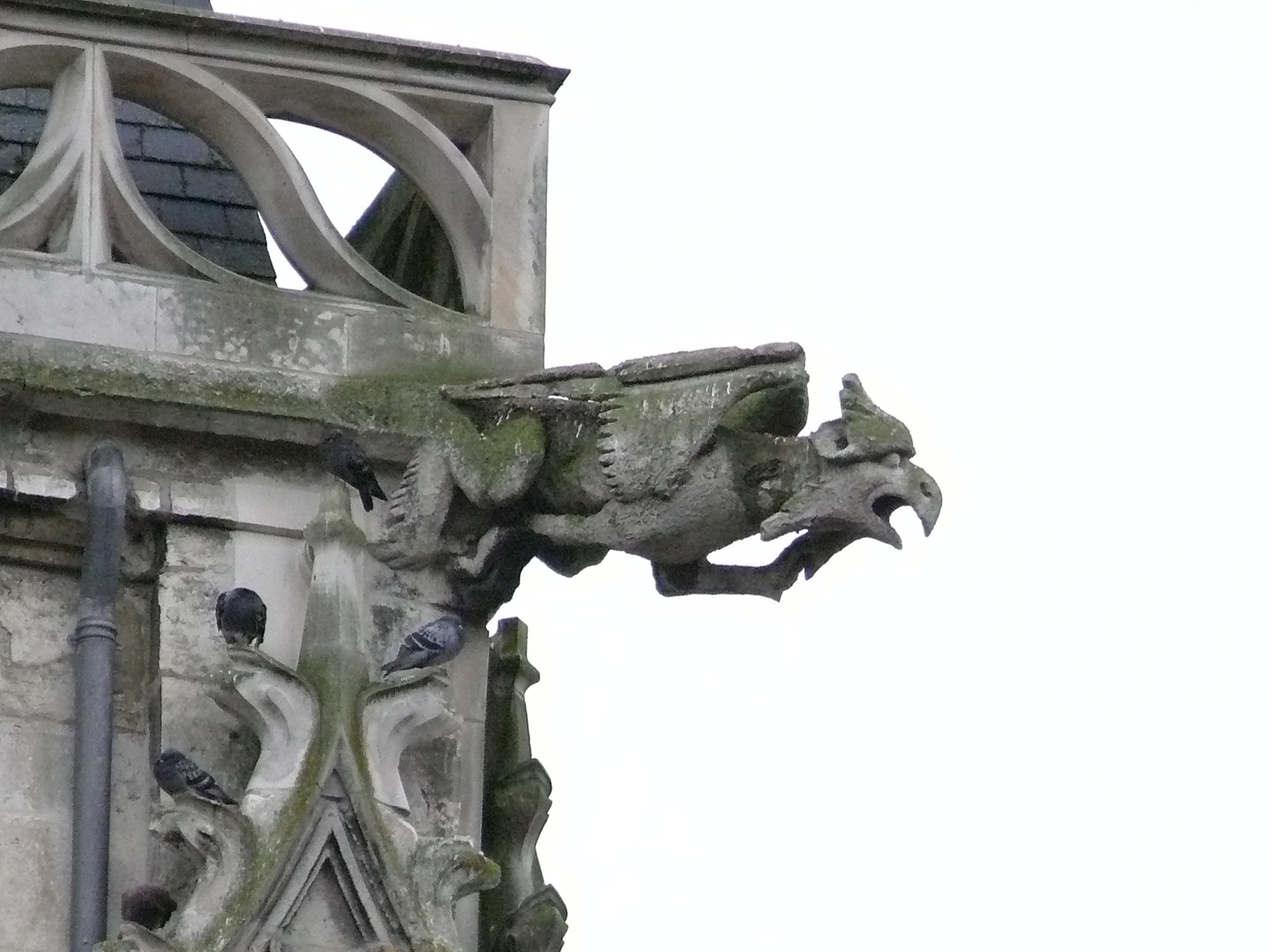
A gargoyle on the church of Saint-Antoine

Dating from the 15th and 16th century, the stone church is in the Flamboyant Gothic style. The plan is the shape of a cross, about 30 meters long by 21 metres wide. The magnificent square tower is 33 metres high. The hanging sculptures in the vaulting and the gargoyles on the tower are deemed worthy of a look. The coat of arms of the Conti family, who were 'seigneurs' of Conty, can be seen in the left transept. Some 18th-century wooden statues decorate the area around the altar.

- Chateau of Wailly

In the town, at the end of a grand avenue, is to be found the remains, in brick and stone, of the old château of Wailly. Built in Louis XIII style, in a semi-circular design. Very few archives exist relating the history of the construction of the château. Building began about 1640 and continued to 1690. Around 1785, a new building was constructed next to the ruins of the old one. In September 1944, Bernard Montgomery established his general headquarters here.

- Chateau of Luzières

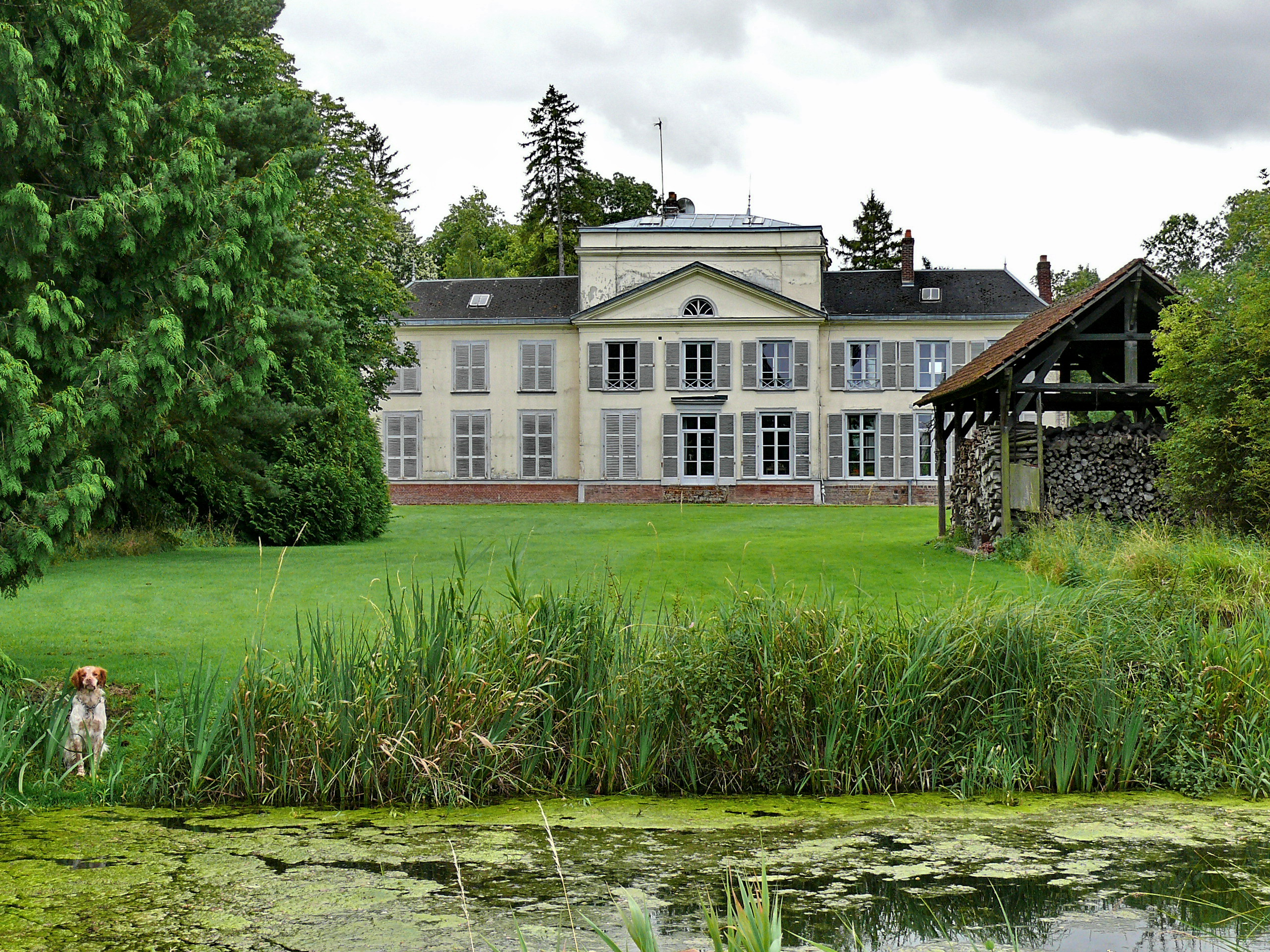
The château of Luzières

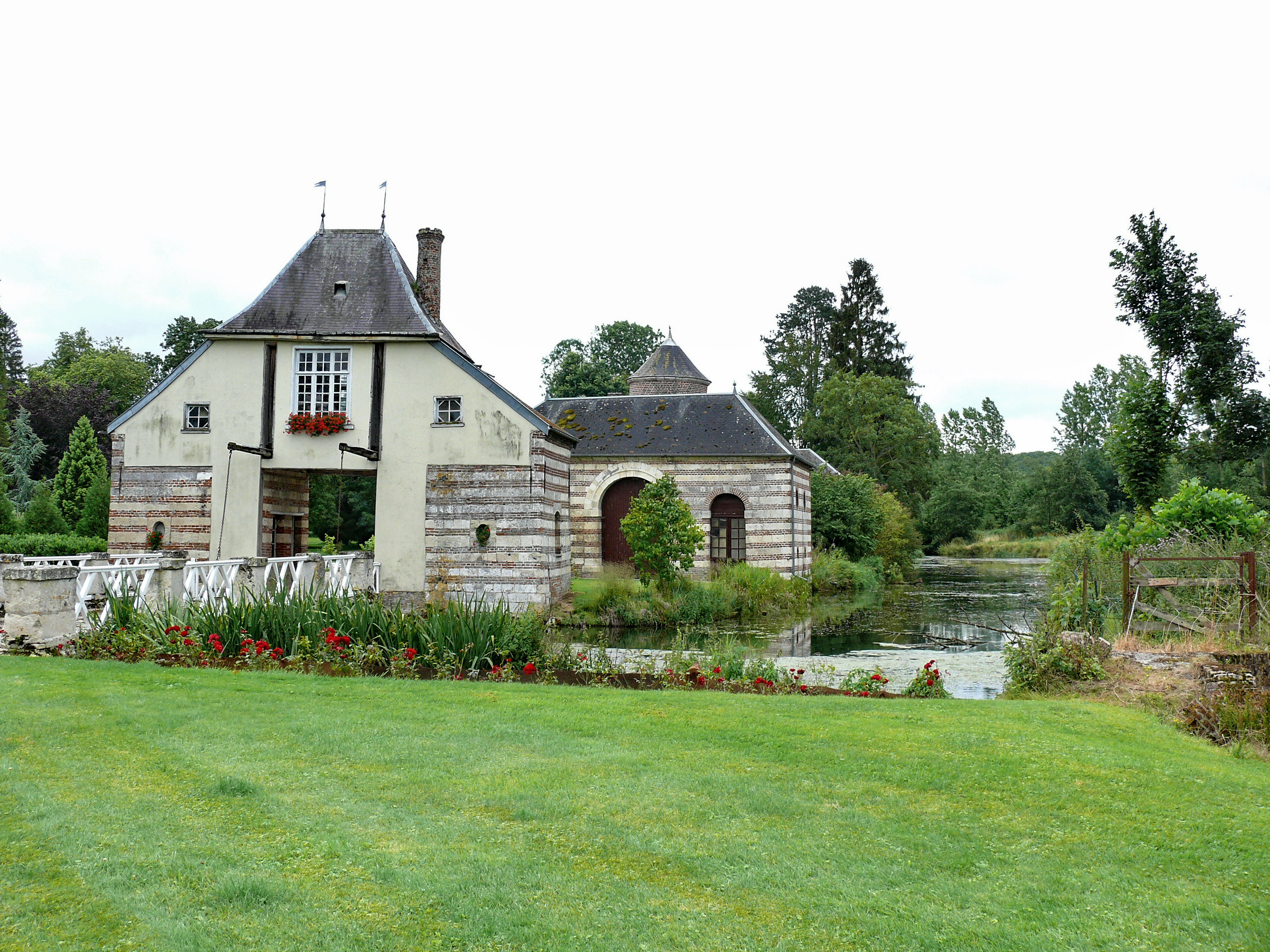
Dependencies of the château

The château de Luzières is found in the hamlet of Luzières, to the south of Conty, in the small valley leading to Belleuse. It was built in the years 1770-1793.
In the grounds, surrounded by water, are some older dependencies, from around 1715.

The château, of neoclassical design, is built of torching, on foundations of limestone, with brick pinioning, typical of the buildings of Picardy.

== Annual events ==
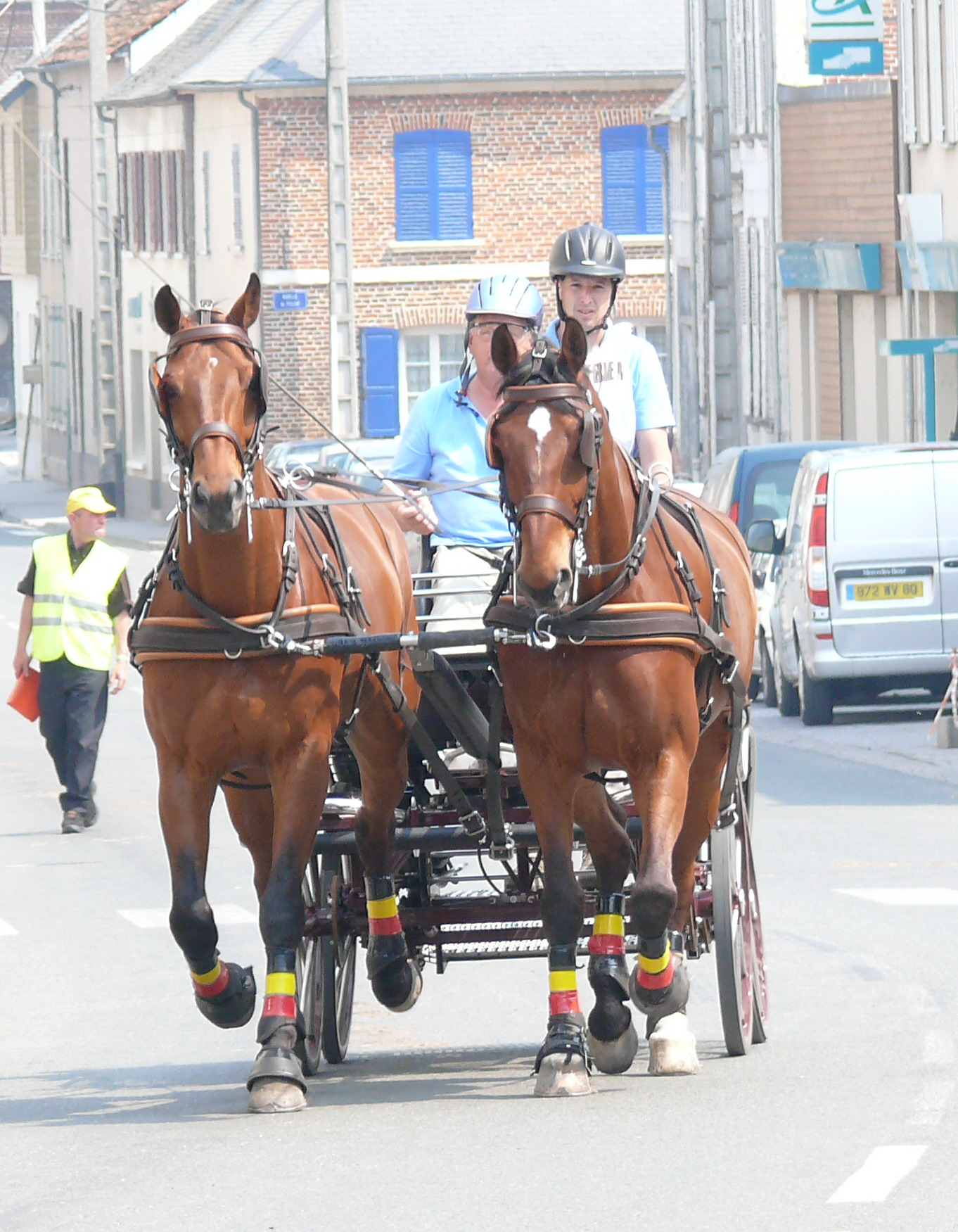
International carriage-driving 2007

Conty is a horse town. Carriage-driving championships are held here every year. In 2009, the heavy horse world championships will be held here.

== See also ==
- Communes of the Somme department
- Princes of Conti
