= Croissy-sur-Celle =

- Commune
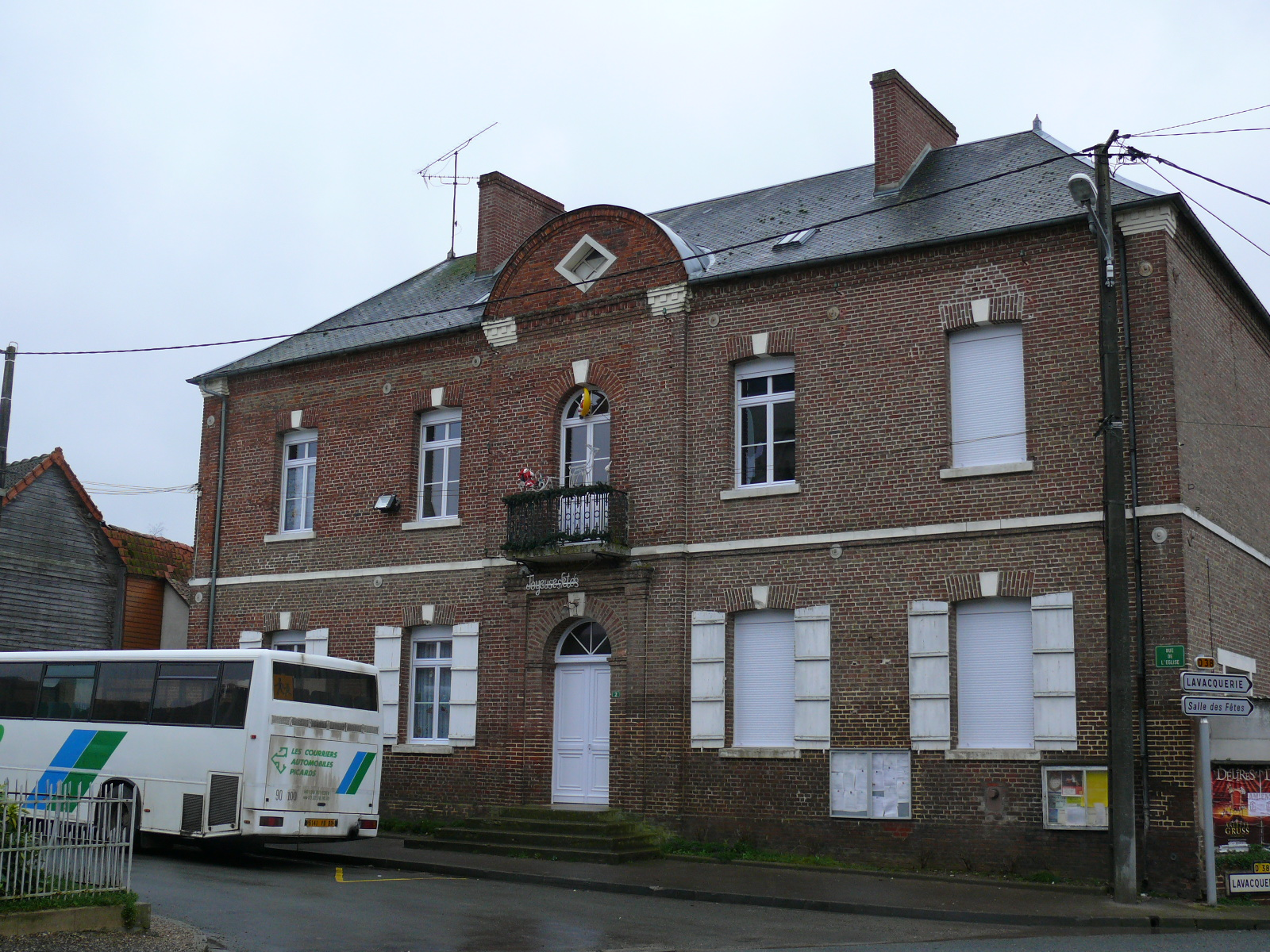
- The town hall in Croissy
- Location of Croissy-sur-Celle
- Location within France Location within Hauts-de-France
- Coordinates: 49°41′48″N 2°10′18″E
- Country: France
- Region: Hauts-de-France
- Department: Oise
- Arrondissement: Beauvais
- Canton: Saint-Just-en-Chaussée
- Intercommunality: Oise Picarde

Government
  - Mayor (2020–2026): Marc Cagnard
- Area^{1}: 11.1 km^{2} (4.3 sq mi)
- Elevation: 71 m (233 ft)
- Highest elevation: 175 m (574 ft)
- Lowest elevation: 67 m (220 ft)
- Population (2023): 231
  - Density: 20.8/km^{2} (53.9/sq mi)
- Time zone: UTC+01:00 (CET)
  - Summer (DST): UTC+02:00 (CEST)
- INSEE/Postal code: 60183 /60120
- ^{1} French Land Register data, which excludes lakes, ponds, glaciers > 1 km^{2} (0.386 sq mi or 247 acres) and river estuaries.

Croissy-sur-Celle (French pronunciation: [kʁwasi syʁ sɛl], literally Croissy on Celle) is a commune in the Oise department in northern France.

== See also ==
- Communes of the Oise department
