= Selle (Somme tributary) =

River in France

The Selle
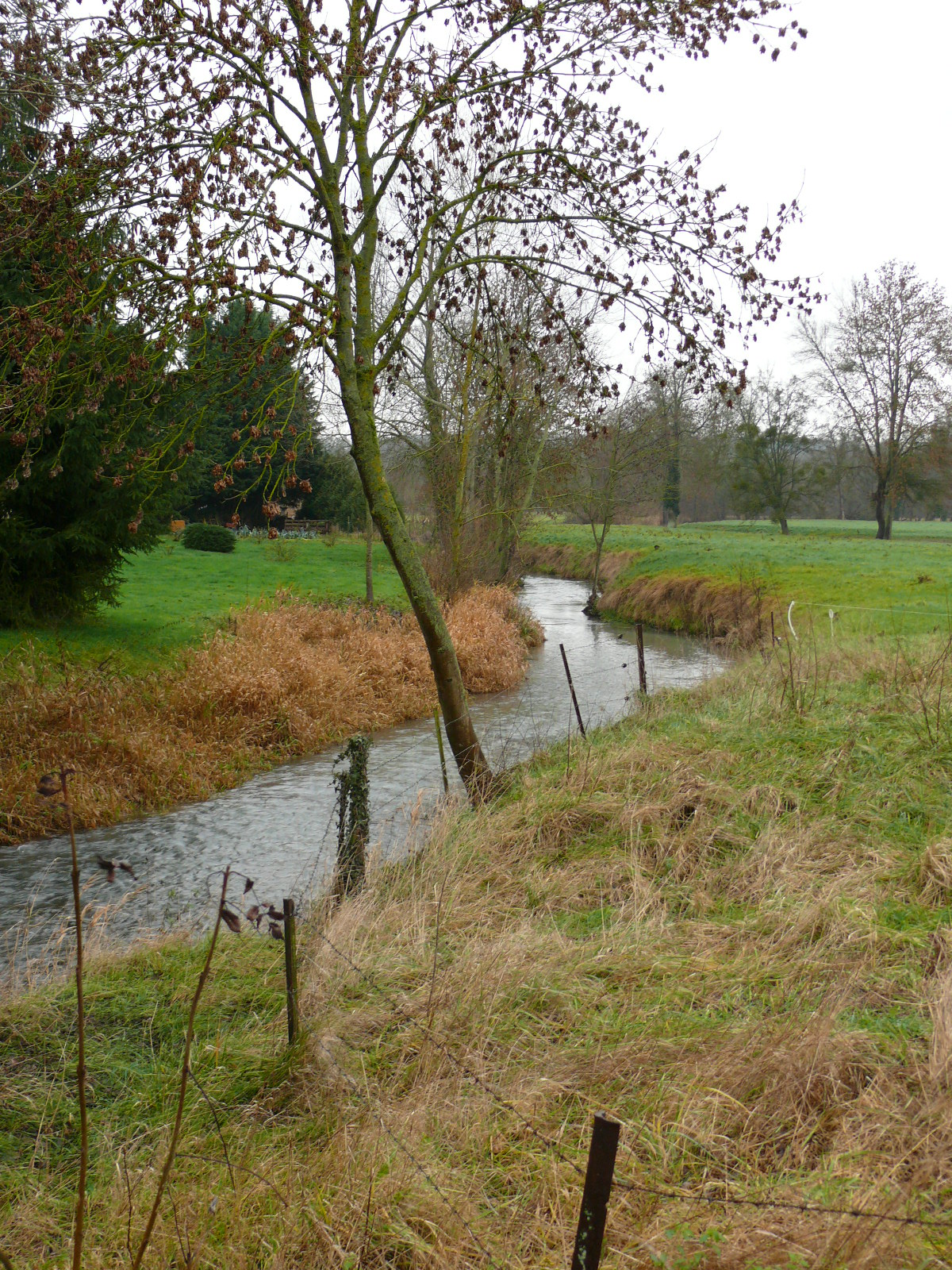
- The Selle (or Celle) at Croissy-sur-Celle

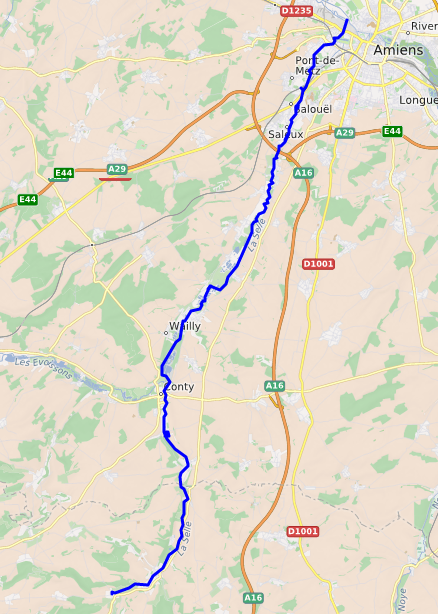

Location
- Country: France

Physical characteristics
- Source
  - location: Catheux
- Mouth: Somme
  - location: Amiens
  - coordinates: 49°54′25″N 2°16′50″E
- Length: 39 km (24 mi)
- Basin size: 610 km^{2} (240 sq mi)
- Discharge
  - average: 4.5 m^{3}/s (160 cu ft/s)

Basin features
- Progression: Somme→ English Channel

The Selle (French pronunciation: [sɛl]; also spelt Celle in the Oise) is a river of Hauts-de-France, France. It is 39.2 km (24.4 mi) long. Rising at Catheux, just north of Crèvecœur-le-Grand, Oise, it flows past Conty, Saleux, Salouël and Pont-de-Metz before joining the Somme at Amiens.

In many places along its course, the river widens to form or fill lakes, much appreciated by anglers and gravel extractors. Several water-powered mills can still be seen including a paper-mill at Prouzel. Brown trout thrive in the clear waters of the river.

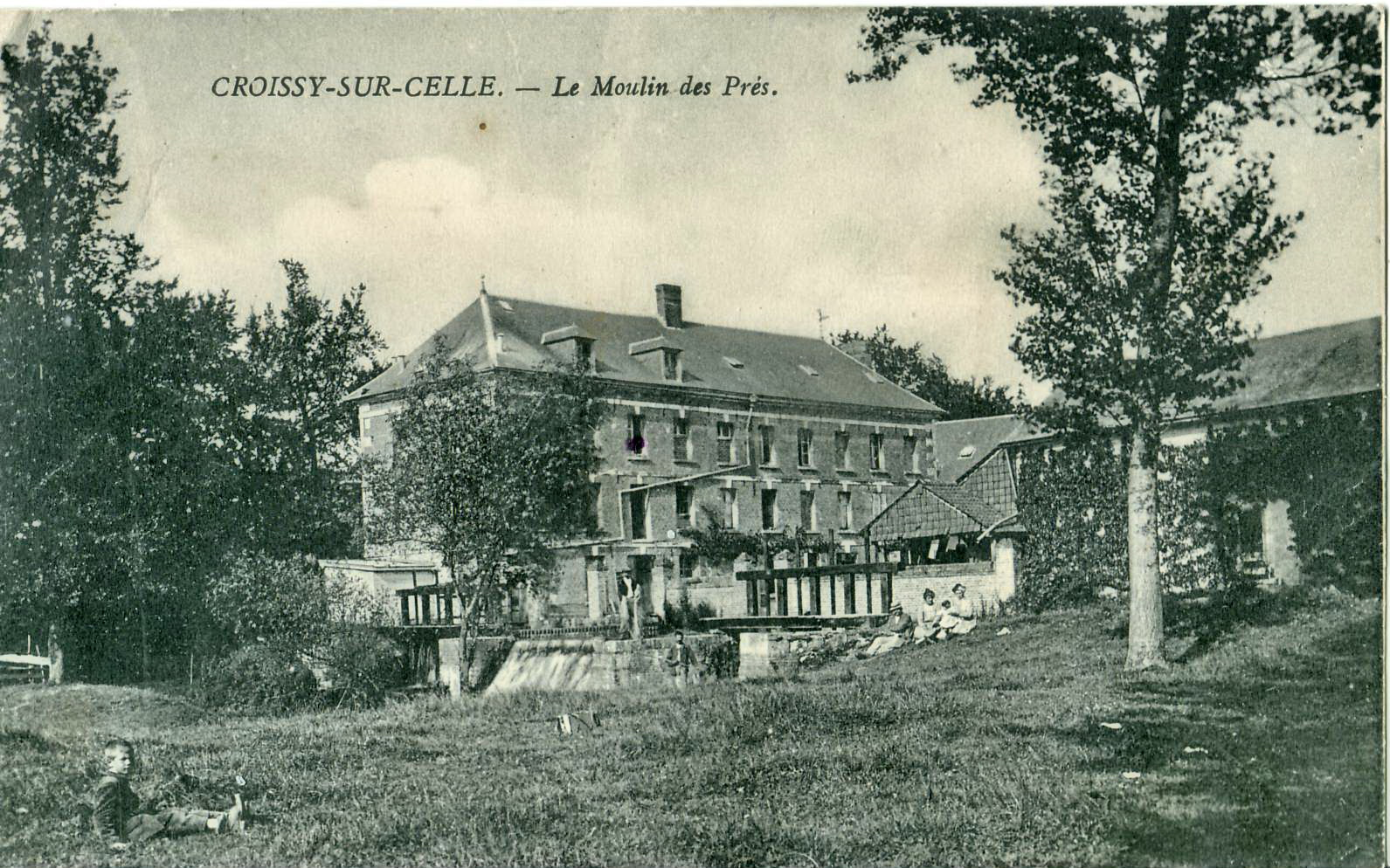
The watermill between Fontaine-Bonneleau and Croissy-sur-Celle

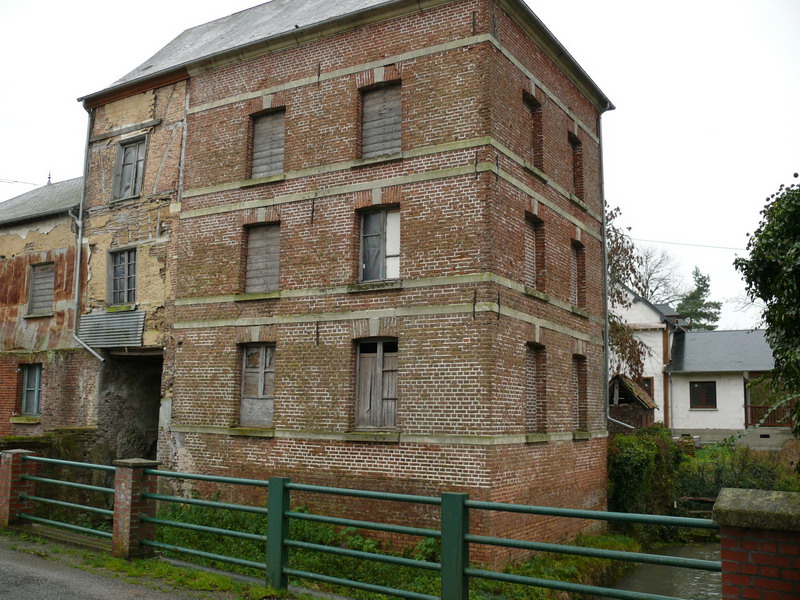
The Mill at Croissy-sur-Celle
