= Thomas Guillaume St Barbe Baker =

British fascist (1895–1966)

Thomas Guillaume St. Barbe Baker MC (2 June 1895 – 6 October 1966) was a pre-War British Nazi who had been an officer in World War I as a second lieutenant in the Royal Field Artillery and later as a captain in the Royal Air Force. He was awarded the Military Cross. He was affiliated with many fascist movements, was an independent Nazi speaker, known for his eccentricity and walrus moustache. Baker was the brother of Richard St. Barbe Baker, famous for his tree-planting programmes, founder of the Men of the Trees.

== Nazi speaker ==
Thomas resided at Cat's Corner Tasburgh, Norfolk, and came to the attention of the authorities for his pro German or anti-semitic speeches that he made from the church pulpit there. From the Public Record Office (PRO): Agents who attended meetings that were held at the Wigmore Hall, the Quaker Hall in Lamb's Conduit Street, Central London and a private house, 109 Shirland Road W9 [London] revealed Baker to be a potential fifth columnist, extreme in his views. Among others he was an associate of the influential Captain Peter Elwyn Wright (whose portrait hung in the Bier Keller in Munich), Commandant Charles Cole, Arnold Leese, John Beckett MP, Lord Redesdale, George Henry Lane-Fox Pitt-Rivers, Norah Elam, Commandant Mary Allen, Fay Taylour (the pioneering female racing driver) and Admiral Barry Domvile, who among others formed a core of ardent British national socialists, almost all but not exclusively from affluent backgrounds with strong establishment connections, and whose names all appear in the infamous red book ledger of membership of the Right Club that was seized from the ownership of Captain Archibald Maule Ramsay M.P. by the authorities in 1940 and has remained mostly shrouded in secrecy ever since.

== Detention ==
During the Defence Regulation 18B fascist round-ups, Thomas went briefly on the run, shaving his distinctive facial hair (a walrus moustache), but was soon caught and jailed for the duration of the war, being an unrepentant Nazi. During reviews by the internment committee, where internees had a chance to prove their loyalty and secure their release, and which many took advantage of, Baker always gave answers in the positive as to his ideology, which only convinced the advisory panel that it was best to keep him locked up.

Among other things he remarked that "I did not like the (Great) War, Sir, not one bit." (PRO papers) As a second lieutenant he had been buried alive during shelling as a junior officer. Unusually Baker was kept interned for a suspended period, orders for release only being issued on 13 April 1945, with release on 21 April 1945. amongst the last of the detainees to be released, (HO 45/25732 120508) whereas most internees, including Oswald Mosley, had been released by 1943.

An officer at the Peveril internment Camp (Peel, Isle of Man), noted that Baker did not have the light of Nazi ideology burning in his eyes and that everything he did was calculated. There was an idea that Baker feigned madness in an effort to secure early release. Recommendations were made to keep him from influencing other prisoners. A German psychologist who was interned with Baker remarked, "the man was a fool, with neither brain nor idea. Every morning he would come into my room with tea and toast on a tray, Sieg Heil me and say 'Good News. Doodlebugs over London!' The preference of the internment committee was to try to keep Captain Baker from other internees, as he was perceived as a bad influence.

While interned, Captain Baker befriended one James Larratt Battersby who after the War, penned The Holy Book of Adolf Hitler, a muddled tome which heralded Hitler as a new Christ. Battersby was a tragic young man, wealthy from his family's hat making empire and a regional organiser in the North West in the pre War British Union of Fascists. He had according to fellow internees been mentally tortured in the notorious Ham detention centre.

It could be argued that Baker had his eye on some of Battersby's money to line his own pockets. Baker pleaded for Battersby's release mostly in vain. (PRO documents) The pair joined up briefly after the War and formed a short lived group that espoused the conversion of Jews to Christianity, the Legion of Christian Reformers. This small group published a newsletter from the North West which was strongly anti-Semitic and had very little impact on the mainstream right wing. In a high-profile incident in 1952 Battersby disrupted the two minutes silence on Remembrance Sunday at the Cenotaph memorial at Whitehall; in 1955 he committed suicide jumping into the paddles of the Mersey ferry. A note found in his pocket read:

Though the sacrifice of the Aryan martyr the world victory is assured. Heil Hitler.

== Personal life ==
Baker's wife gave birth to a son some time before he was interned with whom she visited him. Baker interpreted a mark on the baby's head as a swastika that signalled the boy was the heir to Hitler. His wife soon became fed up with his deranged behaviour and filed for divorce. After the War, Captain Baker settled for some time in Jersey and was visited by prominent fascists in the 1950s but took no real active part again in the politics that had robbed him of five years of his life.
