= William John Battersby =

British hat manufacturer

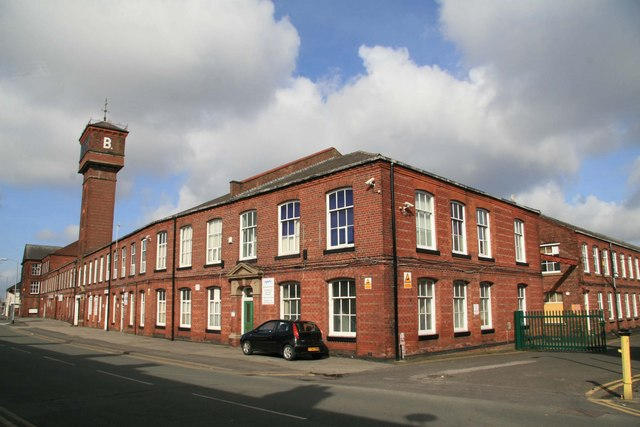
A modern view of Battersby's Hat Works, Stockport, now closed.

William John Battersby JP (30 June 1839 – 22 February 1915) was a British hat manufacturer, of Battersby Hats.

== Early life and family ==
William John Battersby was born in Edward Street, Stockport in 1839, the son of William Battersby (1797–1851) and his wife Sarah Norfolk. He married Mary Oldham (4 Mar 1840, Stockport – 5 March 1909, Stockport), and they had eleven children, nine of whom survived infancy:

- Walter Battersby (31 May 1877, Stockport – 21 January 1955, Knutsford, Cheshire)
- William Norfolk Battersby (1864-1 September 1953)
- George Battersby (1867–)
- Frederic John Battersby (January 1869 – March 1915)
- Frank Battersby (September 1873 –)
- James Johnson Battersby (1875–1949), director of Battersby Hats, was travelling as a first class passenger on the RMS Lusitania when the ship was sunk by a torpedoed fired from a German U-boat. He was the last survivor to be rescued from the ship.
- Ernest Battersby (1878, Stockport – 1 October 1918, Yvetot, near Rouen, France)
- Edgar Battersby (1881 – 29 April 1917, Arras, France)

Edgar and three of his brothers became directors or managers at Battersby Hats.

His grandson was British fascist James Larratt Battersby.

== Career ==
Battersby was awarded a patent in 1896, for "Improvements in and connected with Hats, Caps, and similar Head Coverings", along with his son William Norfolk Battersby. He was awarded another patent in 1900, for "Improvements in Machines for Curling and Ironing Hat Brims", along with Edward Edwards.

He was also a Justice of the peace.
