= Battersby Hats =

Hat manufacturer in Stockport, England

Coordinates: 53.401°N 2.134°W

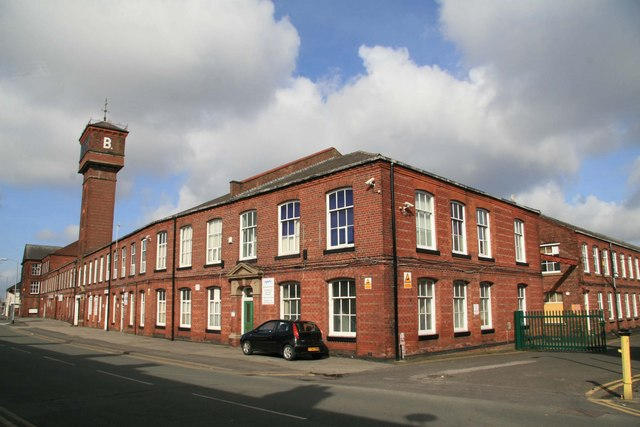
Battersby's Hat Works as it appeared in 2009.

Battersby Hats was the trading name of Battersby & Co, a hat manufacturer of Stockport, England. The firm once had a capacity of 12,000 hats per week but it declined in the second half of the twentieth century and merged with other hat manufacturers in 1966 before hat production ceased altogether in 1997.

== History ==
Battersby's Hat Factory in Offerton, Stockport, first appeared on Ordnance Survey maps in 1895. At one time, Battersby employed over 1,000 people.

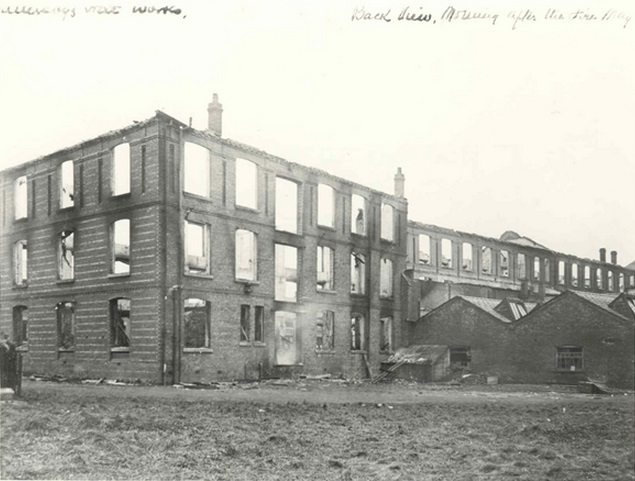
Battersby Hat Works, Offerton, after the fire in 1906.

In May 1906, a fire gutted their factory at Offerton. The fire started on the evening of the 22nd and burned all night destroying the warehouse and "enormous stocks" of straw and felt hats and part of the working area. The cost of the damage was estimated at £50,000.

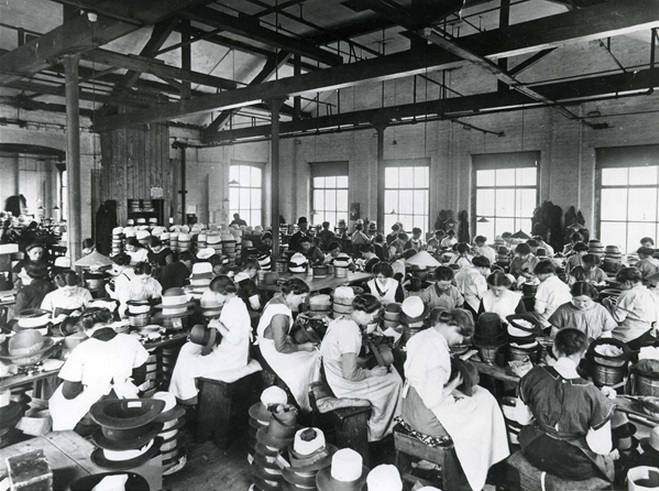
Battersby Hat Works, Offerton, c. 1910.

In 1907, they bought a second factory in Conty, near Arras in the north of France. William John Battersby's son, Edgar died there in the 1917 Battle of Arras, and his son Ernest, who managed the factory died on 1 October 1918 at Yvetot, near Rouen from tuberculosis.

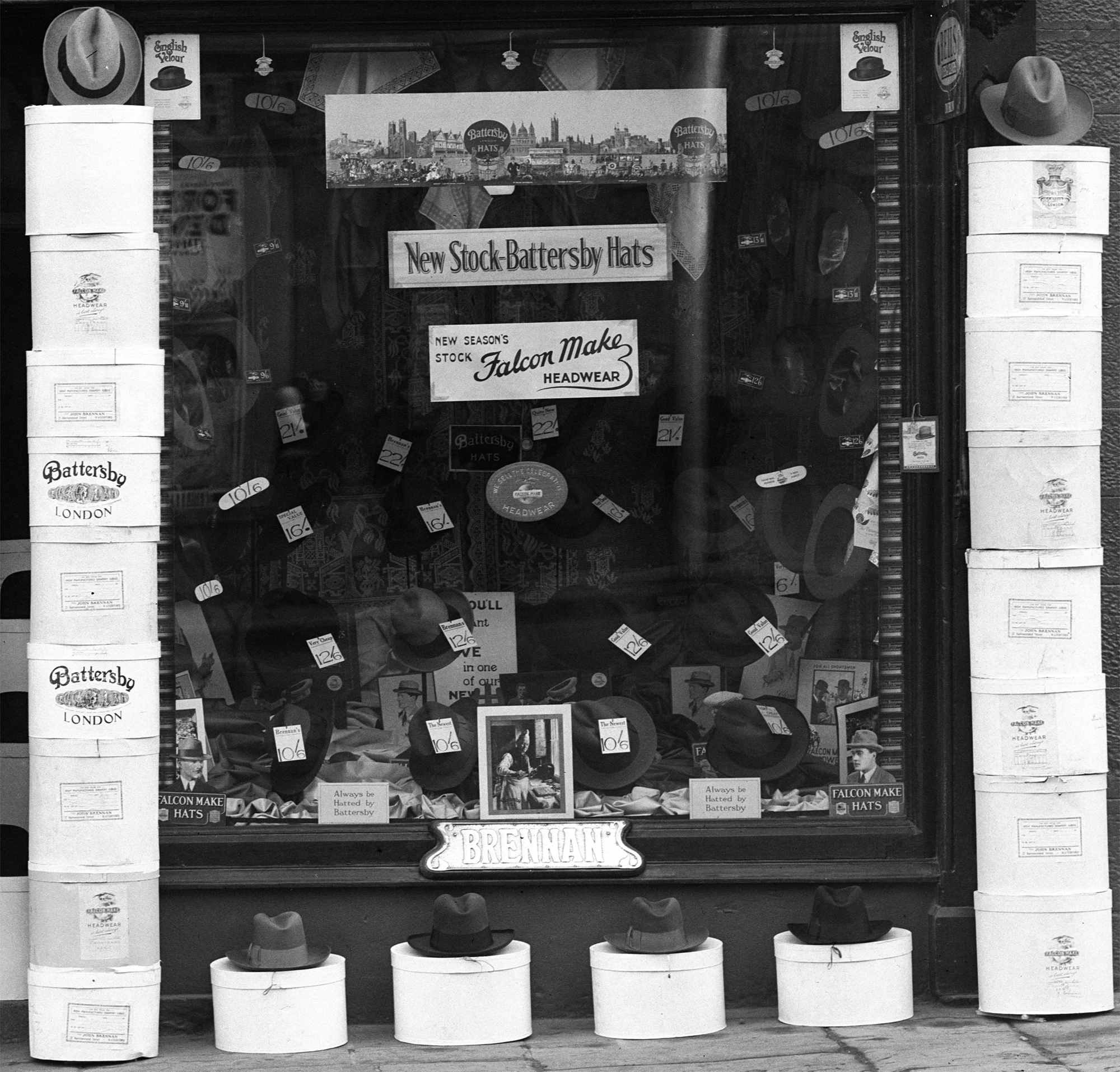
Battersby Hats window display in Waterford, Ireland, 1928.

At one time, the firm was one of the largest hat manufacturers in Britain with an international trade. For an Australian court case of 1935, James Johnson Battersby sent evidence that his company had the capacity to produce 12,000 hats per week. They had London offices in Nicholl Square, EC1, and later at 5 Roseberry Avenue, London, EC1.

In 1966, Battersby merged with four other felt hat manufacturers, Christy & Co Ltd and T. & W. Lees Ltd, both of Stockport, and J. Moores & Sons Ltd, and Joseph Wilson & Sons Ltd, both of Denton, to form Associated British Hat Manufacturers.

=== Closure ===
After a gradual decline, hat production at Associated British Hat Manufacturers eventually ceased in 1997. The factory was used as the first Hat Works museum before the exhibitions were moved to the newly renovated Wellington Mill on the A6 in the centre of Stockport in 2000.

In 2019, Viaduct Housing Partnership and Lane End Group began work on a development at the Hempshaw Lane site for 144 homes.

== See also ==
- James Larratt Battersby
