= James Johnson Battersby =

British hat manufacturer

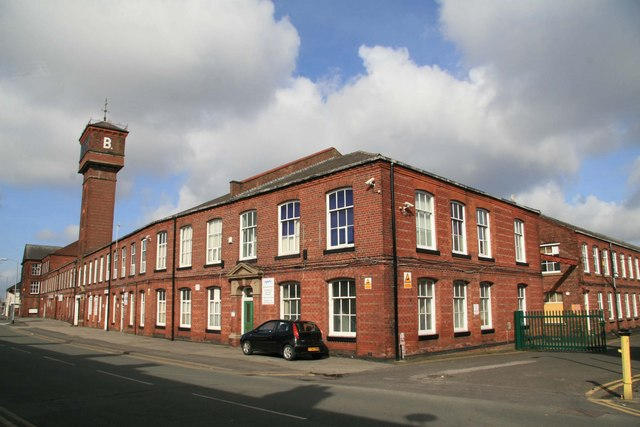
A modern view of Battersby's Hat Works, Stockport, now The Hat Works museum

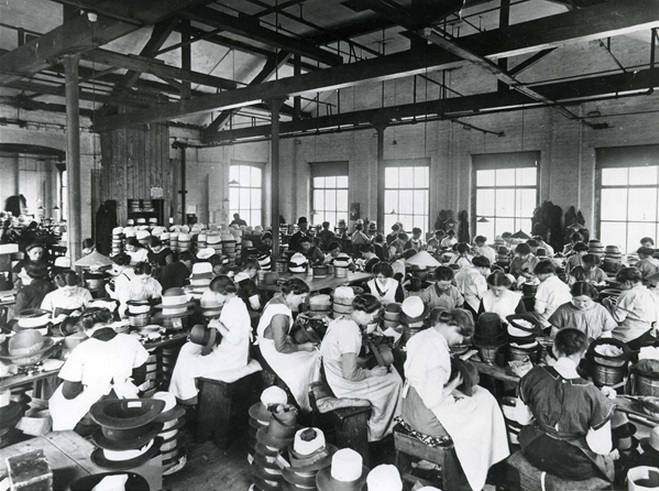
Battersby Hat Works, Offerton c. 1910

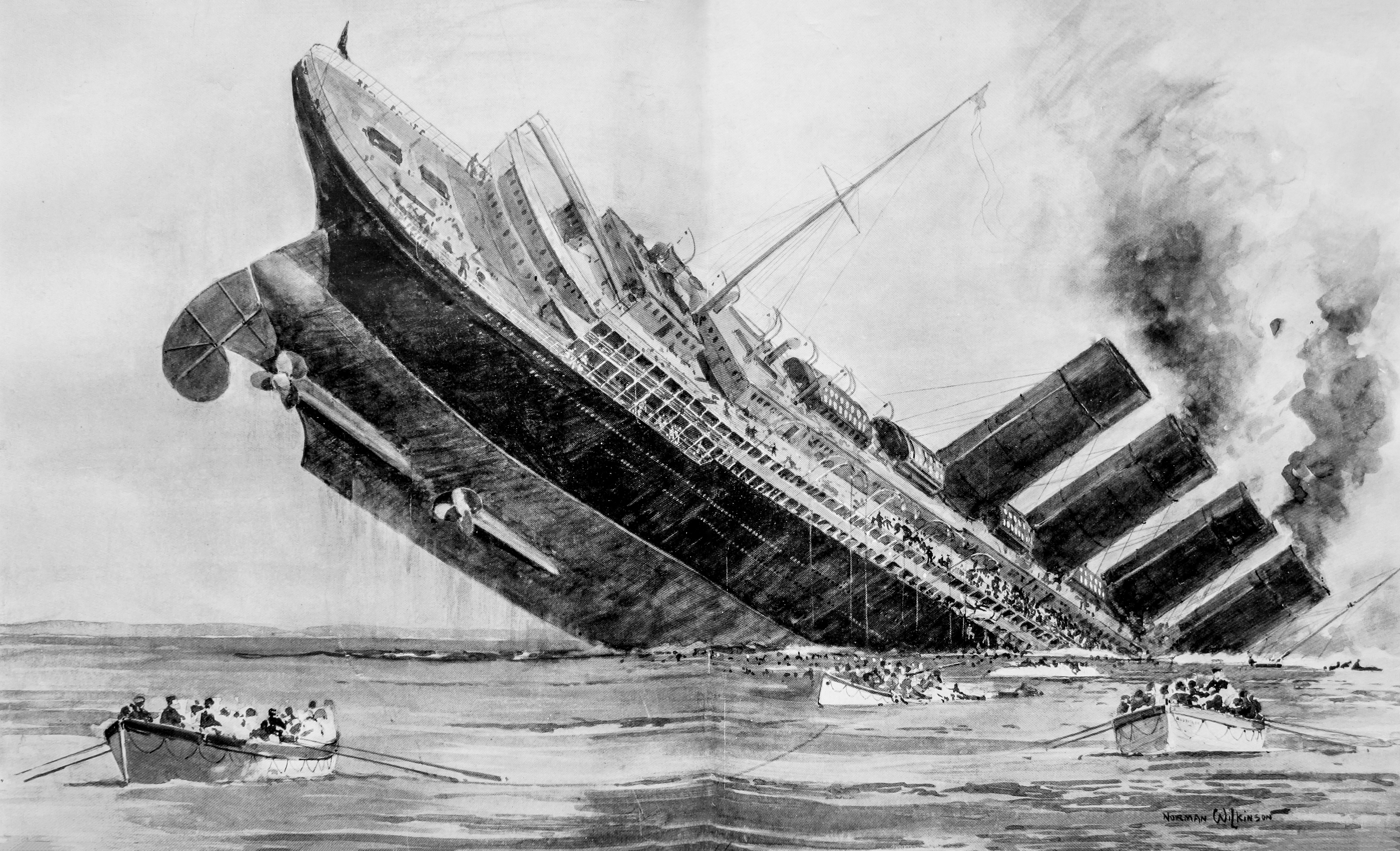
1915 engraving of the sinking of the Lusitania

James Johnson Battersby (1875–1949) was a British hat manufacturer. He was one of seven brothers, a number of whom worked in the family firm of Battersby Hats which at one time was one of the largest hat manufacturers in Britain. In 1915, he was the last survivor to be rescued after the RMS Lusitania was hit by a German torpedo and sunk. His son was the British fascist James Larratt Battersby.

== Early life ==
James Johnson Battersby was born in 1875, the son of hat manufacturer William John Battersby (1839–1915) and his wife Mary. According to the 1881 census, James was one of seven brothers. He had a sister Mary. The family home was at Offerton Lane, Strathclyde, Stockport.

== Career ==
Battersby joined the family hat making business like most of his siblings. The 1901 British census shows five Battersby brothers, Charles, James, Walter, Earnest and Edgar, along with their father William, all working in the business. His sister Edith did not work and the family were able to employ two servants. At one time the firm was one of the largest hat manufacturers in Britain with an international trade. For an Australian court case of 1935, Battersby sent evidence that his company had the capacity to produce 12,000 hats per week.

== Personal life ==
In 1905, Battersby married Annie Larratt Nidd (1876–1970). They had two children, a daughter Edith Mary Battersby (1910–?) and a son James Larratt Battersby (1907–1955), however, the 1911 census shows Battersby living on his own 14 Clifton Road, Stockport, apart from two servants, possibly because his family were not there on census night. James junior was a British fascist and pacifist who came to believe that Adolf Hitler was Christ returned, and wrote Aryan testament: The holy book and testament of Adolf Hitler (1951). He committed suicide in 1955 by jumping into the Mersey Ferry's paddles, causing his death by decapitation.

In 1915, Battersby was travelling as a first class passenger on the RMS Lusitania when the ship was sunk by a torpedo fired from a German U-boat. He was the last survivor to be rescued from the ship.

== Death ==
Battersby died on 14 April 1949. At the time of his death, his address was Dinglewood, Bramhall Park, Cheadle Hulme, Cheshire (now Greater Manchester).
