= Halford Special =

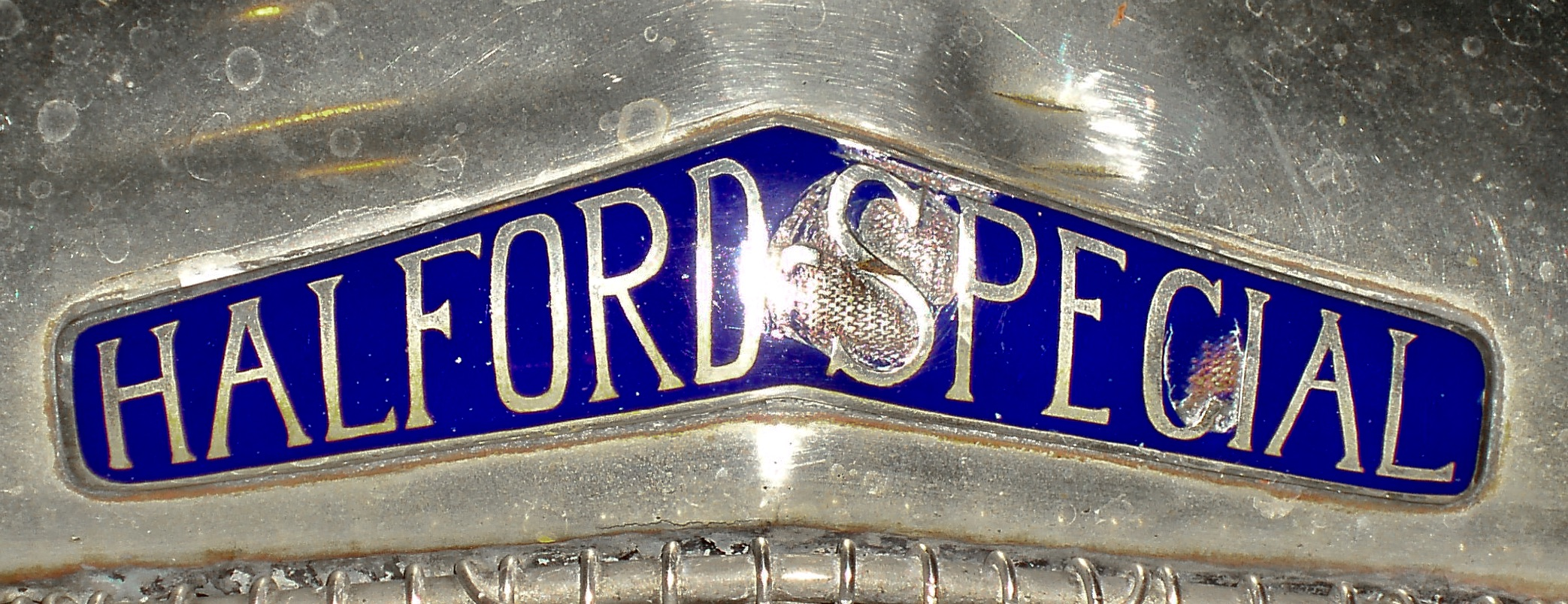
Halford Special badge, Brooklands Museum, Weybridge, UK

The Halford Special was a Grand Prix racing car of the 1920s built by engine designer Major Frank Halford on the chassis of an early Side Valve Aston Martin tourer. It was one of the most advanced British-built racing cars of the mid-1920s and had many racing successes. Halford himself was a freelance engine designer who did work for both the de Havilland Aircraft Company and Napier & Son.

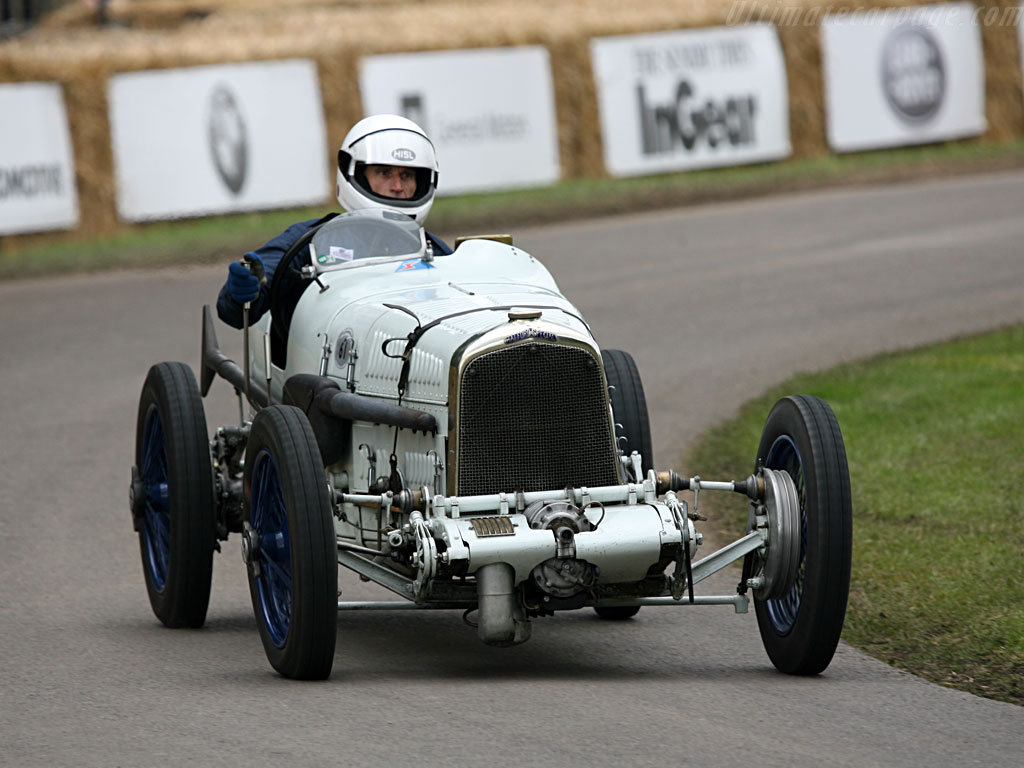
Halford Special at the Goodwood Festival of Speed 2007

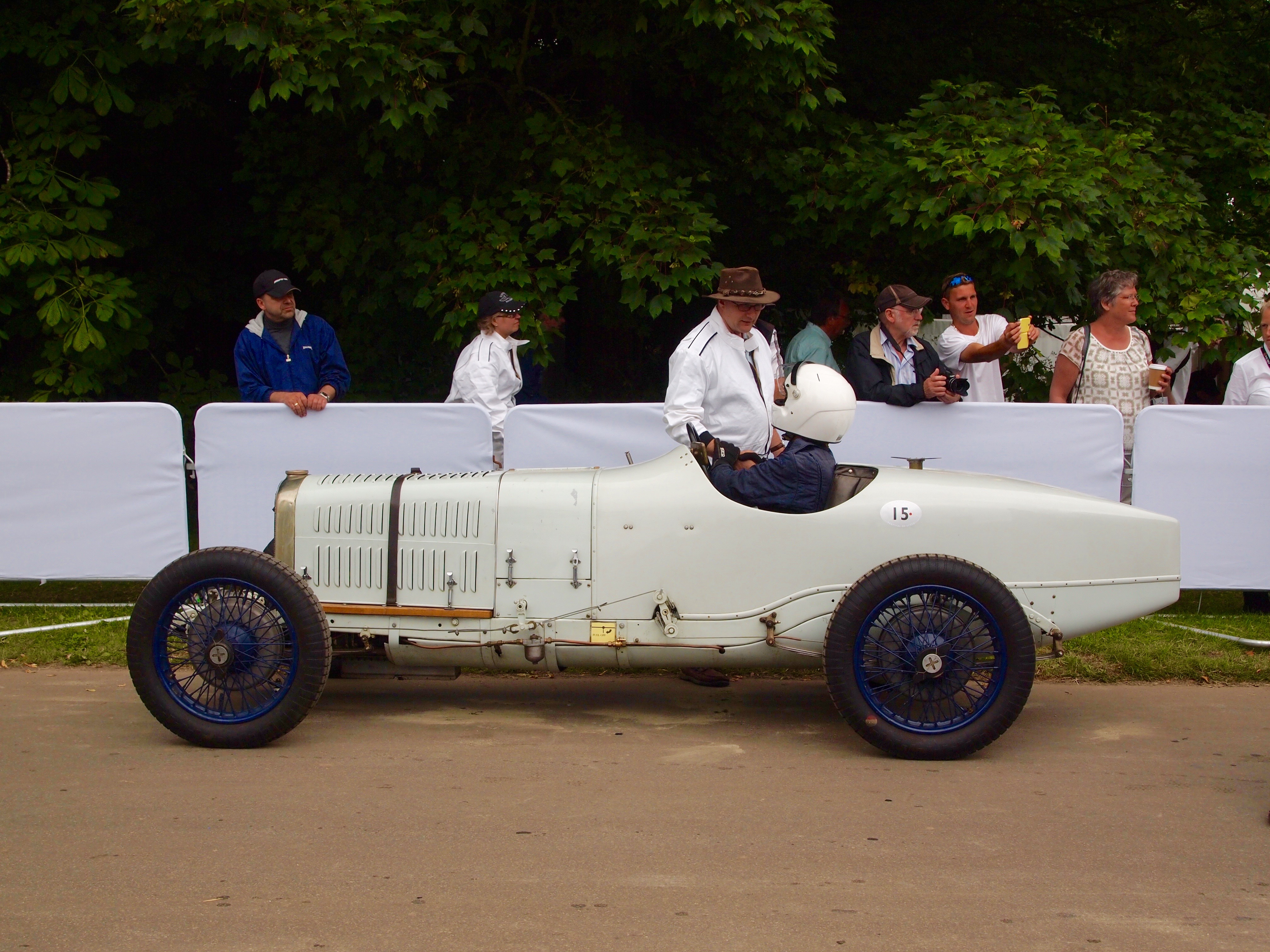
Halford Special.

== History ==
In 1922 Bamford & Martin company (that later became Aston Martin) produced cars to compete at the Brooklands racing circuit, for Grand Prix racing, and to set world speed and endurance records. Two works Team Cars with 16-valve twin-cam engines were built for racing, a record car known as the Razor Blade was built, and a number of other cars were built for customers for racing. One of these customer cars, chassis number 1916, registration number OR1, was later re-built as the AM Halford and then again as the Halford Special.

The early racing history of chassis number 1916 is not fully documented but what is certain is that it was crashed in 1924 and Major Halford bought the chassis and installed an engine of his own design and built a new two-seater body for the car.

Major Halford built two 6-cylinder in-line engines for the car. Each had an aluminium cylinder-block and crankcase with steel liners, with rubber seals at their base. Bore and stroke were 63 mm and 80 mm giving 1.5 litres, the Grand Prix formula for 1926. The cylinder heads were cast iron with two camshafts, twelve inclined valves, and two 12 mm plugs per cylinder.

Drawing on his aircraft design skills, Frank Halford proposed using a turbocharger, but it proved unreliable in tests. (This was probably the first turbocharged road racing car until Renault developed the Alpine turbocharged car in 1968 that went on to become successful Grand Prix cars in the 1970s. A turbo diesel qualified on the pole at the Indy 500 in 1952, and the turbo Offy first appeared at Indy in 1966 in the Huffaker cars).

When first raced at Brooklands, at the 1925 BARC meeting in August, the car appeared with a two-litre Roots-type supercharger mounted on the front of the crankshaft.

At its first race in 1925, with the 95 bhp engine, the narrow Aston Martin radiator proved to be too small, and a wider and deeper radiator was fitted and the car was renamed more simply the Halford Special.

The second engine had twin magnetos mounted behind the two overhead camshafts and developed 120 bhp and is now installed back in the Halford Special.

Frank Halford raced his car twice in 1925 and 12 times during 1926. The car was fitted with a Berk supercharger, manufactured by PressureVac Ltd., 18a North Parade, Bradford, Yorkshire. Halford then sold the car to Captain G. E. T. Eyston, who would later hold the Land Speed Record, to race during the 1927 season. Captain Eyston raced the Halford Special car three times at Brooklands and achieved fourth place in the Montlhéry French Grand Prix in 1927.

In the 1930s the Halford Special was dismantled by its new owner, Viscount Ridley. The first engine was fitted into a Bugatti Type 35 and the second engine was modified to keep the twin magnetos dry and put into a speedboat that sank soon after and the engine spent two years at the bottom of a lake. The present owner of the Halford Special traced the original parts in the 1970s and re-assembled the Halford Special back to its original condition.

The Halford Special is currently kept at the Grand Prix exhibit at the Brooklands Motor Museum and is still used periodically in Vintage Sports Car Club and other events for historic racing cars. The car was involved in an accident at a VSCC race meeting at Silverstone in 2008 but is now restored back to original condition.

== Racing history 1923 to 1928 ==
Year	Race	Result
	Aston Martin chassis number 1916, registration number OR 1	
1923	May Aston Clinton Hill climb (W. G. Barlow) Entry number 22	?
	JCC Spring meeting Brooklands (W. G. Barlow)	4th
	BARC Whitsun, Brooklands (W. G. Barlow?) Entry number 12	?
	BARC Autumn, Brooklands (W. G. Barlow) Entry number 9	?
1924	Voiturette Race, Boulogne (G. E. T. Eyston)	Crashed
	Rebuilt as the AM Halford	
1925	August BARC, Brooklands (Halford)	?
	JCC 200 Mile race, Brooklands (Halford)	5th
	Rebuilt again as the Halford Special	
1926	BARC Whitsun Meeting Brooklands (Halford), 90 Short	1st
	BARC Whitsun Meeting Brooklands (Halford), 90 Long Handicap	3rd
	BARC Whitsun Meeting Brooklands (Halford), 90 Long	3rd
	BARC Easter Meeting Brooklands, (Halford), 90 Short	1st
	BARC Easter Meeting Brooklands, (Halford), 90 Long Handicap	3rd, 107.34 mph (172.75 km/h)
	BARC Easter Meeting Brooklands, (Halford), 100 mph (160 km/h) Handicap	2nd, 104.91 mph (168.84 km/h)
	BARC 3 July, Brooklands, (Halford)	?, 102.04 mph (164.22 km/h)
	BARC Summer Meeting, Brooklands (Halford), 90 Short	2nd, 109.22 mph (175.77 km/h)
	BARC Summer Meeting, Brooklands (Halford), 100 Long	1st, 109.94 mph (176.93 km/h)
	BARC Summer Meeting, Brooklands (Halford), 90 Long	2nd, 109.7 mph (176.5 km/h)
	17 September Meeting, Brooklands (Halford)	?
	26 September Meeting Brooklands (Halford)	4th
	RAC British Grand Prix (Halford)	Retired lying 4th
	JCC 200-mile (320 km) race, Brooklands	10th
1927	Middlesex County AC, Brooklands (Eyston)	1st
	AFC French Grand Prix, Montlhéry (Eyston)	4th
	Junior Grand Prix, Brooklands (Eyston)	4th
1928	Sold to Viscount Ridley, dismantled. One engine installed in a Bugatti, the second engine installed in a speedboat.	
