= James Larratt Battersby =

British fascist (1907–1955)

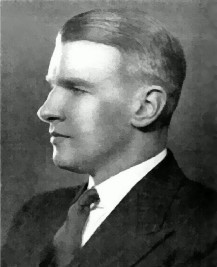
- Battersby c. 1930
- Born: 5 February 1907; Stockport, England
- Died: September 1955 (aged 48); River Mersey, England
- Body discovered: 29 September 1955
- Children: Amanda K. Hale

James Larratt Battersby (5 February 1907 – 14–29 September 1955) was a British fascist and pacifist, and a member of the Battersby family of hatmakers of Stockport, Greater Manchester, England. He was forced to retire from the family firm due to his politics and was interned by the British government during the Second World War along with other British fascists. During his detention he came to believe that Adolf Hitler was Christ returned, and after the war wrote The Holy Book and Testament of Adolf Hitler. He committed suicide by leaping into the paddle wheels of a ferry.

== Early life and family ==
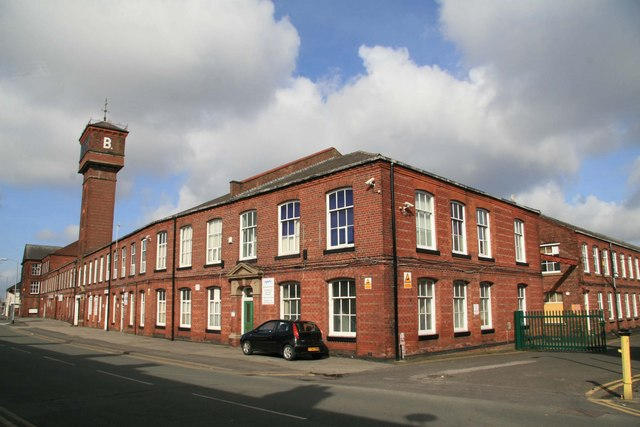
A modern view of Battersby's Hat Works, Stockport, now closed

James Larratt Battersby was born in Stockport in 1907. His father was James Johnson Battersby of the old-established Stockport firm of Battersby Hats and James junior was a director of the firm. His father was travelling as a first class passenger on the RMS Lusitania at the time of her sinking in 1915, after the ship was torpedoed by a German U-boat, and was the last to be rescued before the ship sank.

In 1935, Battersby married Cynthia Helène Metcalfe (born 1914) at St George's Church, Stockport, and they had four children together.

== Fascism ==
In the 1930s, Battersby was increasingly attracted to fascism and became a district leader in Stockport for Oswald Mosley's British Union of Fascists (BUF). In August 1934 he spoke at Sale on the position of the Lancashire cotton industry, arguing for protection of the industry from "the men who had financed oriental competition" that threatened the livelihoods of Lancashire men. In October 1934, The Blackshirt reported that he put a "well reasoned argument for Fascism in Britain" at a speech in Manchester, despite being heckled by a group of what the paper called "Reds".

In February 1935, he spoke at Heaton Moor where he "analysed the international capitalist position" and argued that "Lancashire was being sacrificed to the interests that were exploiting backward peoples to choke the Western world with sweated goods". In June 1935 he gave a talk on fascism at a Stockport Sunday school, and he and Mrs Battersby met the children afterwards. As well as his speaking engagements Battersby was also a regular donor of funds to the BUF coffers. As he became more deeply involved, Battersby was eventually forced to resign from the board of Battersby's Hats in August 1939 (he was known as "the mad hatter" in fascist circles) and he left his wife and children to "serve Hitler".

== Second World War ==
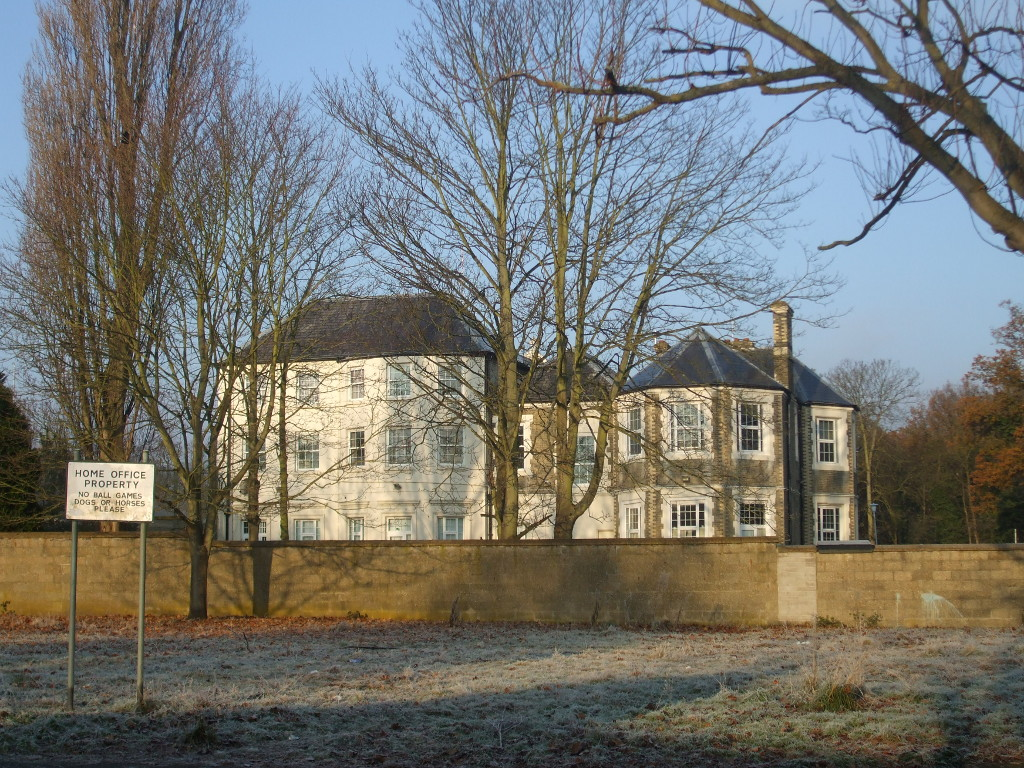
Latchmere House in 2012

In June 1940, after the outbreak of the Second World War, Battersby was detained by the British government under the newly introduced Defence Regulation 18B and sent to Camp 020 at Latchmere House, London, with a number of other fascist sympathisers. He wrote a diary of his time there, which was published in 1947 as The Bishop Said Amen: On the Author's Experiences During Detention as a Pacifist, in which he complained that "everything possible was done to agitate, frustrate and torment us".

In his memoirs, Charlie Watts, BUF district leader Westminster St. George's, remembered Battersby at Latchmere House and wrote of the meagre rations they all received and the threats from the guards to put them before a firing squad if they caused any trouble. Later, they were both transferred to what the BUF referred to as the "Ascot Concentration Camp" in Berkshire, in reality a hastily arranged internment camp, where they became close friends.

Battersby was transferred to the Isle of Man, with other fascists, where he met and became a close friend of Captain Thomas Baker MC who professed to believe that Adolf Hitler was Christ returned and conducted religious rituals on that basis. Baker was regarded by the camp authorities as an impostor more interested in the money of his fellow internees than the fascist cause, but Battersby took his views quite seriously and they contributed to his developing religious mania. In June 1943, Battersby was released from detention and appeared before a conscientious objectors tribunal where he offered to broadcast his views to the British nation. The offer was not taken up.

== Kingdom House ==
After the end of the Second World War, Battersby led a religious community which he named the Legion of Christian Reformers, sometimes called the League of Christian Reformers, or the Christian Herald Group, at Kingdom House, River, West Sussex, a house donated to them by fascist and wealthy barrister W. G. Barlow. There they held services in front of a special altar, guarded by two large dogs according to Macklin, during which they worshipped Adolf Hitler as Christ returned to rid the world of the Devil.

The activities of the group soon attracted the attention of politicians and the press. On 29 November 1945, The Daily Herald reported that a Mr A. Wilson had bought two swastika flags from the sale of the effects of the former German embassy in London and claimed he intended to give them to James Battersby. The Herald's reporter wrote that in residence at Kingdom House were Thomas Baker and his wife, a Mr Schneider (presumably A. J. Schneider), a housekeeper and a young man, but that they hoped to have a self-supporting community of up to 16. Prayers were held morning and evening in a small chapel. The house was an old manor provided by a "wealthy adherent" who lived near Fernhurst, Surrey.

On 4 December 1945, Member of Parliament Christopher Peto asked the Home Secretary, Chuter Ede, to put an end to the Kingdom House group due to the feelings of revulsion it had created in the country. Ede replied that he had no power to do so "merely because it was unpopular or ridiculous while its advocates committed no breach of the law." On 8 December 1945, the Daily Mirror reported that the Communist youth paper Komsomolskaya Pravda, in apparent reference to the Kingdom House group, had commented in a Radio Moscow broadcast that "Already a group of people in a certain country has set itself up to create a party to which the name of Hitler is sacred .... This is like giving freedom to spread the germs of the plague." The secretary of the group was reported as replying that they regarded Hitler as a "divine instrument".

On 14 December 1945, an unofficial "raid" was carried out on Kingdom House by persons who remain unknown. It closed soon after. In December 1945, Tom Driberg MP, in reference to the "recent raid", placed a question in the House of Commons to ask whether steps were being taken to "check Fascist provocation"?

== A "practical Christian" ==
In 1946, Battersby was back in Stockport. A journal was published, which he edited, titled The Christian Digest and Witness (No. 1 May 1946, No. 2 June 1946) which became The Kingdom Herald from July or September 1946. It incorporated the Stockport Boro' Times and Practical Christian and called itself "The most outspoken journal in Britain". Pamphlets were published under the "Practical Christian" name.

In 1949, Battersby was in South Africa to try to establish a series of Hitler memorial institutes but failed in his endeavours. After his return to the UK, the South African authorities declared him an "undesirable immigrant" to prevent him visiting the country again. In 1950, the cover of Another letter from Sydney noted that the author had just returned to Europe from Australia.

== Arrested at the Cenotaph ==
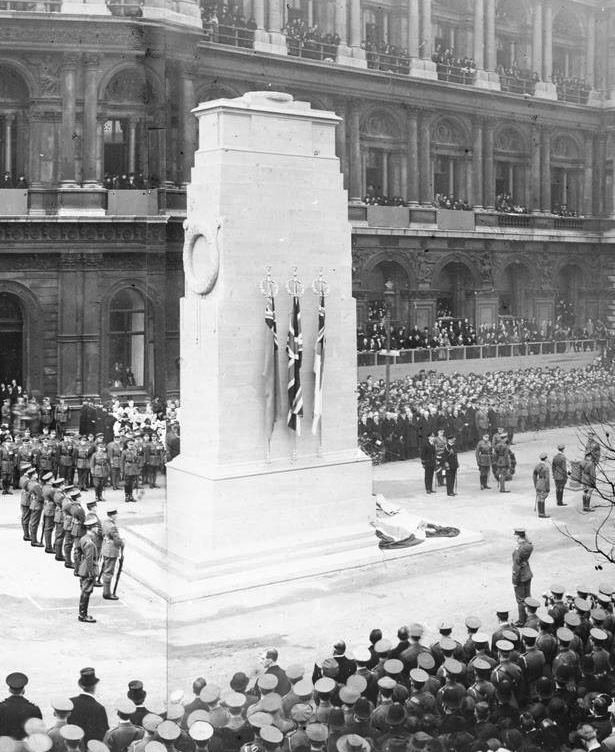
The Cenotaph unveiling ceremony, 1920.

In 1952, Battersby disrupted the annual two-minute silence at the Cenotaph in London by shouting, according to police evidence, "This is the day of English judgement. I speak the truth. English children must be saved. Trust God and the eternal Christ. Heil Hitler." He was said then to have stood to attention and given the Nazi salute. Battersby was then arrested and taken to Cannon Row Police Station. He appeared at Bow Street Magistrates' Court charged with "insulting behaviour" whereby a breach of the peace might be occasioned, and using insulting words.

Battersby pleaded not guilty. A police inspector said that Battersby had been arrested for his own safety after the crowd became hostile. He heard shouts of "Cut his throat" and "String him up". Battersby had on him five photographs of Hitler and a programme for the Cenotaph ceremony on which his exclamation was written. He also had affidavits from three Harley Street doctors dated 1947 to say that he was sane and a copy of his Aryan Testament (1951).

Battersby claimed to have spoken out of "the deepest sense of responsibility to God and to my fellow countrymen." He claimed that for 25 years he had been a student of theology, divinity and eschatology and the judgement of which he spoke was nothing to do with one country or another but of the whole world. He claimed his actual words were "This is the day of judgement. Take the children out of London. Praise God and the eternal Christ. Heil Hitler", and to have been planning his actions for 12 months. Battersby, whose address was given as York Terrace, Manchester Road, Southport, was remanded in custody for one week and subsequently fined £10 with an alternative of two months imprisonment on the charge of using insulting behaviour. The charge of using insulting words was not dealt with.

== Death ==
In 1955, Battersby disappeared from his lodgings on 4 September 1955 in Southport, Lancashire, after writing to a newspaper that: "My work here is complete. I follow the Fuehrer to glory and eternity. Through the sacrifice of the Aryan martyrs our world victory is assured. Heil Hitler." He subsequently committed suicide by jumping into the Mersey Ferry's paddles, causing his decapitation, and was found dead on 29 September 1955.

In former Hull BUF District Leader, John Charnley's autobiography Blackshirts and Roses (Brockingday Publications, London 1990), he wrote several pages relating to his friendship with Battersby, who he described as suffering from depression after the defeat of the German Army at the Battle of Stalingrad in 1943, and who was "transferred to the care of the medics...and after medical treatment released", his embarrassment at being greeted in the streets of post-war Southport by Battersby with the salutation Heil Hitler and his feelings of sadness, guilt and regret upon hearing of his death.

Battersby's youngest daughter Amanda K. Hale has written a novel about her father entitled Mad Hatter (Guernica Editions 2019) based on his involvement in fascist politics, religion and how his absence and death affected her and her family.

== See also ==
- List of solved missing person cases (1950–1969)

== Selected publications ==
- Calling 100,000 Christians. An indictment of religious hypocrisy and a plea for practical Christian peace making. J. L. Battersby, Poynton, 1946. ("Practical Christian" Pamphlets)
- Put Not Your Trust in Riches. Poynton, 1946. ("Practical Christian" Pamphlets)
- The Bishop Said Amen: On the author's experiences during detention as a pacifist. With a portrait. Kingdom Press, Poynton, 1947.
- Heirs of the Kingdom. Kingdom Press, Poynton, 1948. (As Larratt Battersby)
- Another Letter from Sydney. Kingdom Press, Manchester, 1950. (As Larratt Battersby)
- Aryan Testament: The Holy Book and Testament of Adolf Hitler. On the Legion of Christian Reformers. With portraits. Kingdom Press, Manchester, 1951.
- The Holy Book of Adolf Hitler. J. L. Battersby for the German World Church in Europe, Southport, 1952.
