= Thomas Battersbee =

English cricketer

Thomas Battersbee (1791 – 20 July 1865) was a schoolmaster and English cricketer who played a single match for Kent in 1822. He was born in Beddington and died in Nunhead.

Battersbee played in a single historically important match for the team, during the 1822 season, against Marylebone Cricket Club. From the tailend, he scored 13 not out in an innings victory for the team. Carlaw notes Battersbee was almost certainly the substitute to replace John Willes who had walked off the pitch "in high dudgeon" after being no-balled for roundarm bowling.

The Chislehurst Society note that the Chislehurst Academy was on Heathfield Lane on a site latterly occupied by a house of the name of Furzefield. The institution passed through the hands of a Mr. Mace and a Mr. Wyburn before passing to Battersbee and in the 1851 Census of Bromley, Battersbee is listed as a 60-year old School Master living at the school.

Battersbee was also noted for his role as a churchwarden. When he died on 20 July 1865 aged 75 at Peckham in Surrey he was described as a Schoolmaster.
