= Mary Battersby =

Irish artist and naturalist

- Born: between 1763 and 1785
- Known for: ornithological illustration

Mary Battersby or Miss Battersby (fl. 1801–1841) was an Irish artist and naturalist.

== Life ==
Investigations into Mary Battersby have concluded that "nothing is known" about her. Some have stated that Battersby was the unmarried daughter of Robert Battersby of Bobsville, County Meath, Ireland, who in 1763 married Marianne, daughter and co-heiress of Haynes Wade of Lislin, County Cavan, Ireland. Others have questioned this, suggesting that she could have been the daughter of Robert Battersby's brother, referred to as John of Lakefield. Her date of birth, based on when she began donating work, is estimated to be between 1763 and 1785. It is possible that the "M" on her paintings did not refer to Mary, but Mrs or Miss, or even a pet name. This means that there a number of women in the Battersby family that the work could be ascribed to, including a Penelope Battersby. Due to the lack of further evidence, a conclusive identity for this artist cannot be ascertained. Some of the donations given of her work is inscribed with the address of the artist as 21 North Cumberland Street, Dublin and later No. 16 Mountjoy Square East. These addresses are presumed to be those of her mother or other relative.

== Artistic work ==
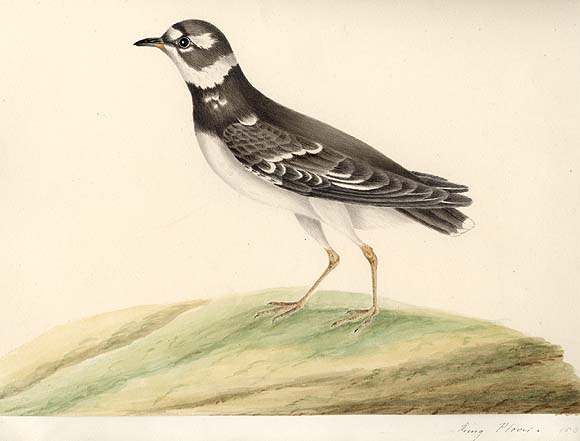
Painting of a Ringed Plover by Mary Battersby

The works of Battersby are all signed "Miss Battersby" or "M:Battersby". Her corpus is six albums of paintings, a record of one letter and two addresses. There is no other documents pertaining to her, and she does not appear to have exhibited at any time. While she is often described as a "flower painter", given her known work, her interest lay more in the observation of birds than botany. It is unknown if Battersby received any formal training in watercolours, though it was not uncommon for young women to receive such training. Though her ornithological work is described as strictly true to life and without extraneous details, though over the course of her work her style did not develop.

The Royal Dublin Society received four volumes of drawings from Miss Battersby, the first in 1820, three in 1836 with a letter. These were Flowers drawn from Nature, Drawings from a collection of birds shot in Pennsylvania, North America by Robert Battersby Esq. MD, Native birds which were all shot in the County Meath, and Drawings taken from a collection of stuffed birds in the Dublin Museum. Another two volumes are in the Ulster Museum, one dated 1841 and the second undated. A small album is also in the collections of the National Library of Ireland, with studies of flowers, butterflies, insects and feathers, it has been suggested that this may have been produced by another member of the Battersby family, Frances Isabella Battersby (1828-1909), a regular donor to the Museum of the Royal Dublin Society whose letters are in the archive of the National Museum of Ireland and include correspondence with a number of leading naturalists from 1860s-1870s. The volume of drawings of the stuffed birds from the 'Dublin Museum' (Museum of the Royal Dublin Society), now the National Museum of Ireland - Natural History, consists of life sized studies of the mounted birds in the museum. The studies were of exotic birds including hummingbirds.
