= Associated British Hat Manufacturers =

Associated British Hat Manufacturers Ltd was a holding company formed in 1966, by merging five of Britain's largest felt hat manufacturers. The intention was to rationalize a struggling industry that faced a declining market and foreign competition.

After the merger production was concentrated at the Christy factory in Stockport and the Wilson's factory in Denton. In 1980, ABHM sold the entire share capital of its subsidiary Christy & Co to Cadogan Oakley for £1.2 million. This resulted in the closure of the Wilson's factory, and all remaining hat production being consolidated into the Christy factory, which later closed in 1997.

== Companies that merged to form ABHM ==
- Christy & Co Ltd, Stockport
- Battersby & Co Ltd, Stockport
- T. & W. Lees Ltd, Stockport
- J. Moores & Sons Ltd, Denton
- Joseph Wilson & Sons Ltd, Denton
