= Hat Works =

Museum and former cotton mill in Greater Manchester, England

Coordinates: 53°24′31″N 2°09′44″W

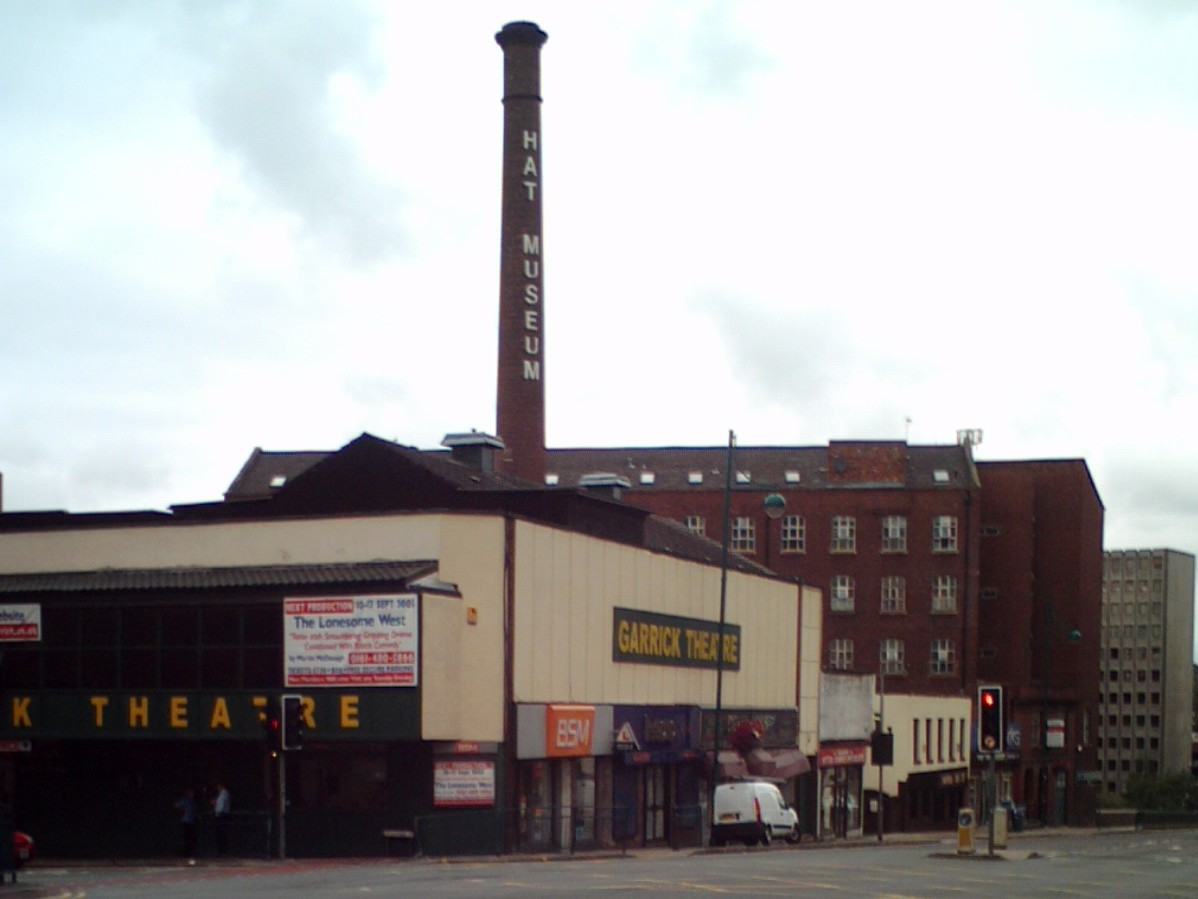
- The museum in 2008, with the Garrick Theatre to the left

- Location in Greater Manchester

Cotton
- Alternative names: Wellington Mill

Spinning Mill
- Structural system: Brick and cast iron fireproof mill
- Location: Stockport, Greater Manchester, England
- Owner: Thomas Marsland
- Current tenants: The Hat Works Museum, residential

Construction
- Built: 1828
- Renovated: Chimney 1860
- Floor count: 7

Equipment

Listed Building – Grade II
- Official name: Wellington Mill
- Designated: 10 March 1975
- Reference no.: 1356847

The Hat Works is a museum in Stockport, Greater Manchester, England, which opened in 2000. Before that, smaller displays of hatting equipment were exhibited in the Stockport Museum and in the former Battersby hat factory.

The building, Wellington Mill, was built as an early fireproof cotton spinning mill in 1830–1831 before becoming a hat works in the 1890s. It is a Grade II listed building on the A6, Wellington Road South, between the town centre and Stockport railway station.

== Background ==
Stockport played a pivotal role in the textile industry of the United Kingdom. Firstly it was silk throwing. In the early 18th century, England was not capable of producing silk of sufficient quality to be used as the warp in woven fabrics. Suitable thread had to be imported from Italy, where it was spun on water-powered machinery. In about 1717, John Lombe travelled to Italy and copied the design of the machinery. On his return he obtained a patent on the design, and went into production in Derby. When Lombe tried to renew his patent in 1732, silk spinners from towns including Manchester, Macclesfield, Leek, and Stockport successfully petitioned parliament to not renew the patent. Lombe was paid off, and in 1732 Stockport's first silk mill (indeed, the first water-powered textile mill in North West England) was opened on a bend in the River Mersey. Further mills were opened on local brooks. Silk weaving expanded until in 1769 two thousand people were employed in the industry. By 1772 the boom had turned to bust, possibly due to cheaper foreign imports; by the late 1770s trade had recovered. The cycle of boom and bust would continue throughout the textile era.

On 21 July 1784, Samuel Oldknow arrived in Stockport and bought a house and warehouse on Hillgate, he gave out 530 lengths of cotton warp to the local hand loom weavers who returned the woven pieces, these he traded through a London agent. This was the putting-out system that survived in weaving long after the factory system was normal for spinning. He had commercial connections with Richard Arkwright and with the textile manufacturer Drinkwater. To obtain yarn he opened a mill in 1791 at the Carrs, on the Tin Brook and a large mill at Mellor. The combination of a good water power site (described by Rodgers as "by far the finest of any site within the lowland" [of the Manchester region] ) and a large female and child workforce used to textile factory work meant Stockport was well placed to take advantage of the phenomenal expansion in cotton processing in the late 18th century. Warren's mill in the market place was the first. Power came from an undershot water wheel in a deep pit, fed by a tunnel from the River Goyt. In 1796, James Harrisson drove a wide cut from the River Tame which fed several mills in the Park, Portwood.; Ashmore (1975). In 1786, Henry Marsland gained water rights to erect another mill adjacent to the 55 yards (50 m) by 12 yards (11 m) Park silk mill which he already owned. The two Carrs silk mills had converted to cotton before 1785, and the larger silk mills such as Park and Logwood followed.

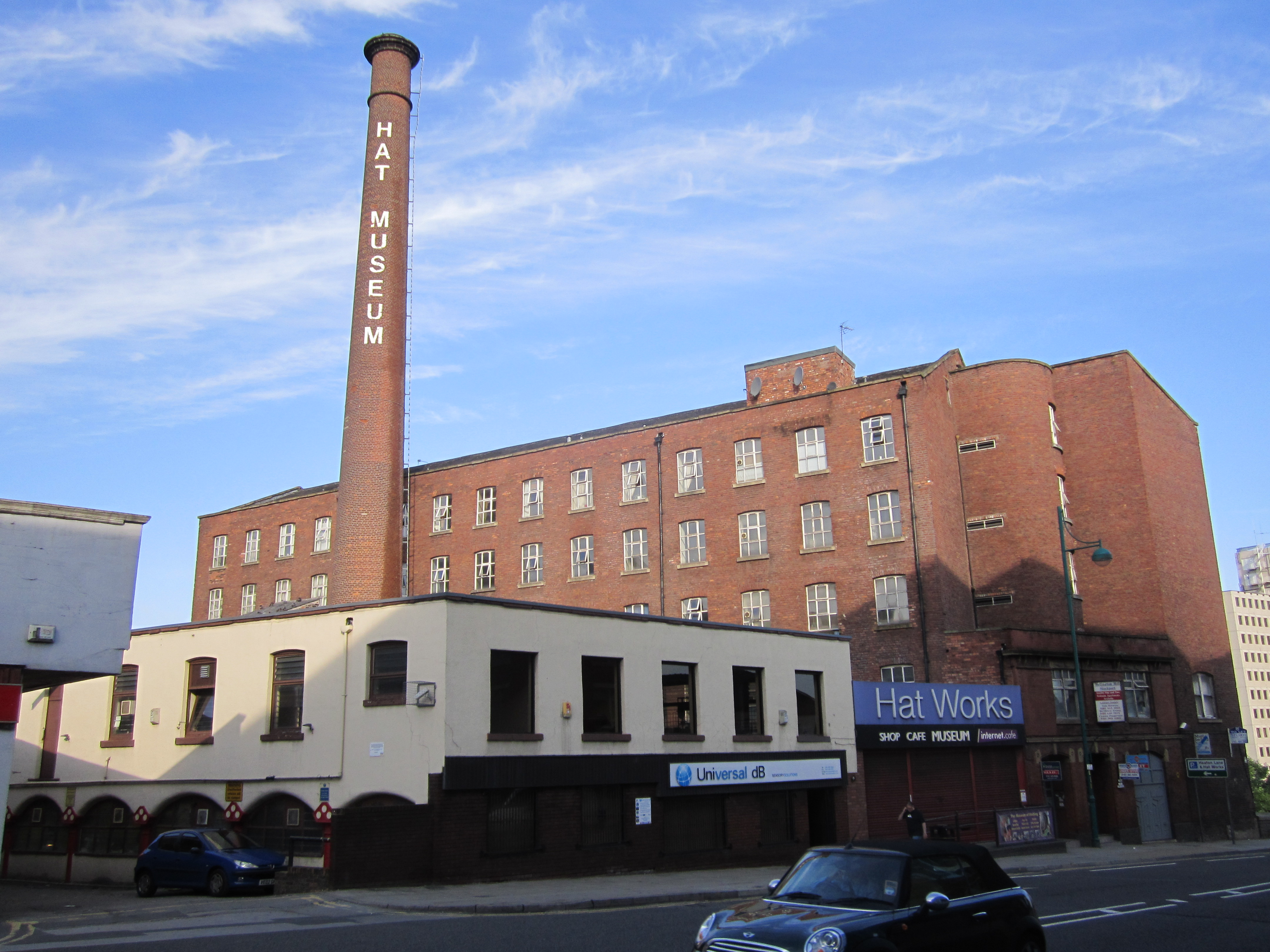
The Hat Works in 2012

Hatmaking was established in north Cheshire and south-east Lancashire by the 16th century. In the early 19th century the number of hatters in the area began to increase, and a reputation for quality work was created. The London firm of Miller Christy bought out a local firm in 1826, a move described by Arrowsmith as a "watershed". By the latter part of the century hatting had changed from a manual to a mechanised process, and was one of Stockport's primary employers; the area, with nearby Denton, was the leading national centre. Support industries, such as blockmaking, trimmings, and leatherware, became established. The First World War cut off overseas markets, which established local industries and eroded Stockport's eminence. Even so, in 1932 more than 3,000 people worked in the industry, making it the third biggest employer after textiles and engineering. The depression of the 1930s and changes in fashion greatly reduced the demand for hats, and the demand that existed was met by cheaper wool products made elsewhere, for example the Luton area.

== History ==
Wellington Mill was built in 1830 by Thomas Marsland (1777–1854) whose wealth was founded on a major calico printing concern in Stockport. His father John Marsland (1749–1811) established a dyeing business in the early 1780s. He was mayor of Stockport in 1803. Thomas entered the business producing a blue-dye and Turkey red then moved into calico printing which was described by Baines as the largest in Europe. He had print works on Daw Bank and on Chestergate. The Manchester and Buxton Trust opened the turnpike called New Road (now Wellington Road) in 1826. Marsland acquired the 4,812 square yards (4,023 m^{2}) of land between his printworks and the turnpike to build the mill.

When completed the building was occupied by a partnership between Marsland and two of his sons-in-law, Richard Hole and Alexander Lingard. When the business was established in 1834–1836 he removed himself from the partnership and a third son-in-law, William Courteney Cruttenden joined the firm. In 1851, Richard Hole was bought out. Lingard share passed to his son John Marsland Lingard on his death in 1860 and by 1870 John Marsland Lingard was the sole occupier. In 1872 he leased the building to John and George Walthew a spinning and doubling sewing cotton firm. In 1895 the executors of Lingard and Cruttenden sold the mill to Ward Brothers, hatters.

The 200 feet (61 m) chimney was added in 1860. Ward Brothers occupied part of the building from the 1895 to the 1930s.

== The mill building ==
Wellington Mill was part of the industrial complex of the Marsland family, build on land adjacent to their printing works, as such additions have been made, and subsequently demolished. The building we see today is based on a 7 1/2-storey fireproof mill built between 1828 and 1831 on Wood Street/Carr Green/Daw Bank/Edgeley Road with an entrance on the second floor level on New Road/ Wellington Road South. It has a semicircular stair tower projecting from the eastern wall. The privy tower has gone but two additional 7-storey extensions or wings remain next to the stair tower.

The 7 1/2-storey building is 135 feet (41 m) by 42 feet (13 m). It was 15 bays long each of 9 feet (2.7 m). It was of fireproof construction and had a cast-iron frame work, with two cast-iron pillars supporting, and bolted to, a cast-iron beam which ran across the width of the mill. From these beams were sprung brick vaulting that spanned the width of the mill. The vaults 9 feet (2.7 m) in width, rose 11 inches (280 mm) above the line of the beam thus has a radius of 11 feet (3.4 m). Outward pressure on the beams was mitigated by wrought iron longitudinal tie-bars. The space above these vaults was filled with sand, upon which was laid the wooden flooring of the next storey.

The ground floor was 9 feet 6 inches (2.90 m) high and other floors 9 feet (2.7 m), barring the sixth floor which was 8 feet 6 inches (2.59 m). From the exterior we see 6-foot (1.8 m) by 4-foot-6-inch (1.37 m) windows on each floor in each bay with camber arch lintels and sandstone sills.

The roof truss system is particularly interesting. It is made up of a series of six-segment, bolted, cast-iron, two-centred arches of 33 feet (10 m) radius, with an offset of 27 inches (690 mm). These support, and are bolted to, the four longitudinal principal rafters. The roof was of blue Welsh slate.

=== Power and equipment ===
The original two-storey engine house and the later three-storey engine house are no longer standing. Paperwork suggests that the original 1830 65 hp beam engine had a 7-foot (2.1 m) stroke and a 17-foot-6-inch (5.33 m) beam: it was replaced in 1835 by a larger engine. It is speculated by that it was positioned to take advantage of a culvert that took water to the adjacent printing works: water was needed to supply the steam engine's condenser.

The first chimney was square in section. It was replaced when the second engine house was built. The new chimney, round in section is of red brick, 200 feet (61 m) tall with a stone oversailer. It served four Lancashire boilers.

The main power shaft entered the mill on the first floor through the south wall of bay 15. There was a bevel gear and a vertical shaft passed through the floors to each storey. Here it was transmitted by a main shaft across the mill. The three longitudinal line-shaft runs took power from the main shaft. (six on the first three floors), they were slung by hangers on the jack-beams. Later this system was modified with the main shafts on the three upper floors being driven by belts. All of this was later removed and additional features obscure the original locations.

Although no record exist of the type of spinning machinery actually used, the width of the mill suggests it was built to accommodate self-acting spinning mules which had been patented in 1825. Marsden described himself as a spinner and muslin manufacturer. A manufacturer, then would mean he managed the weaving: if indeed he used the factory system, the weaving would have been done in other mills. John and George Walthew who took over in 1870, operated the mill for spinning and doubling used throstles.

=== Other buildings ===
Butting onto the two-storey engine house was another 6 1/2-storey cotton mill built later but before 1842. This was at one stage called Daw Bank Mill: it has been demolished.

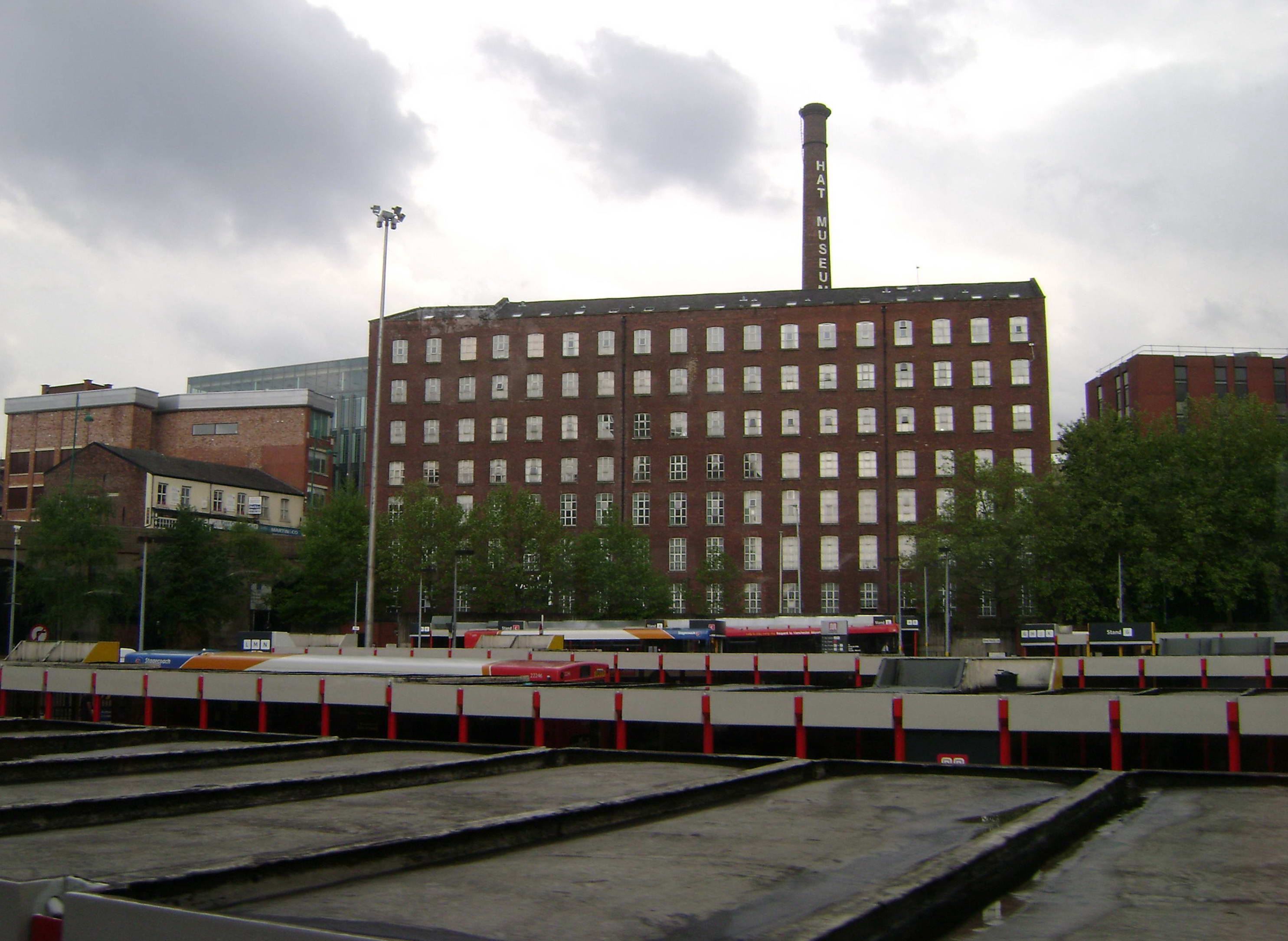
The Wellington Mill from the former bus station in 2009

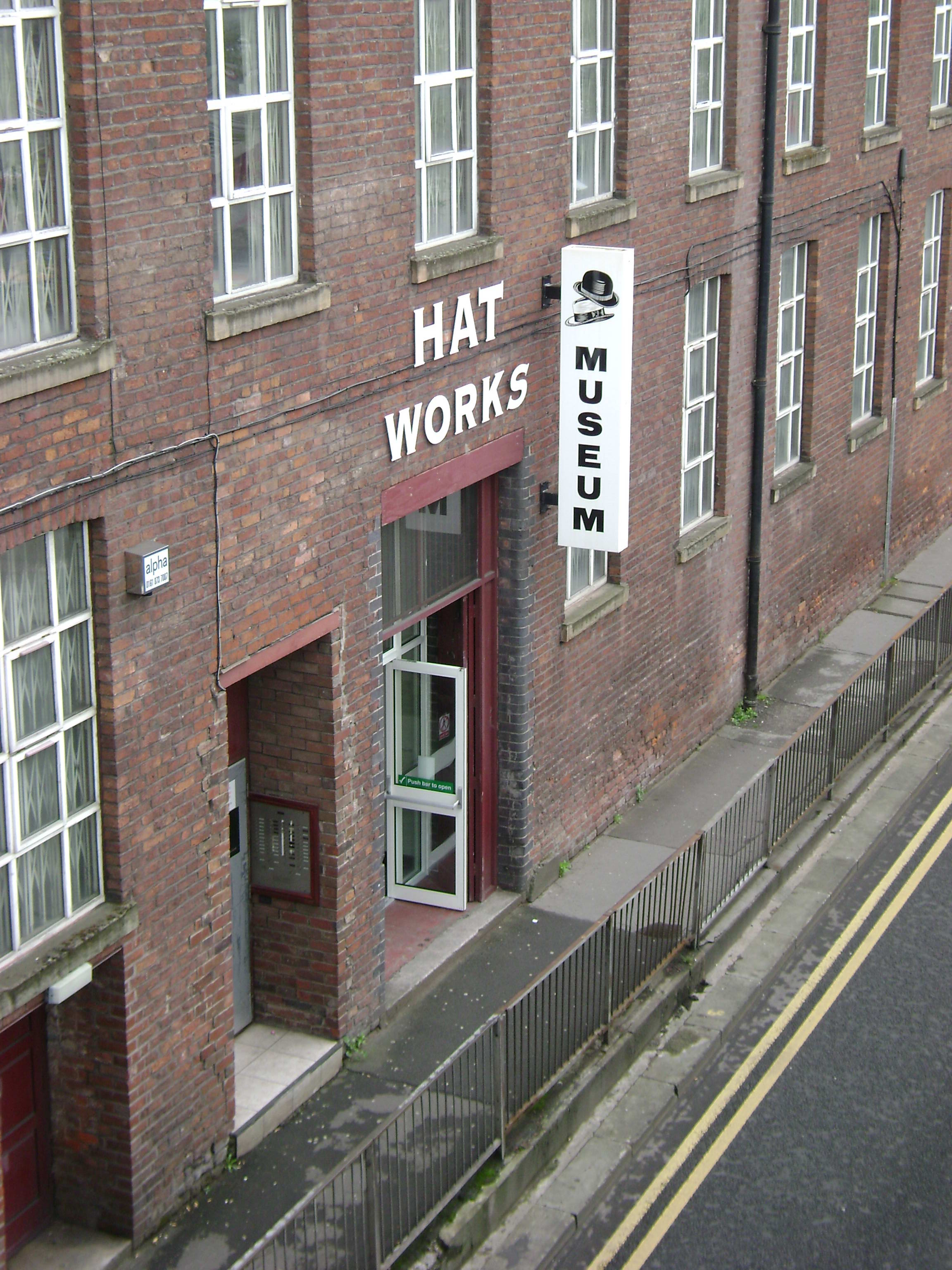
Wellington Mill, ground floor, Daw Bank, 2009

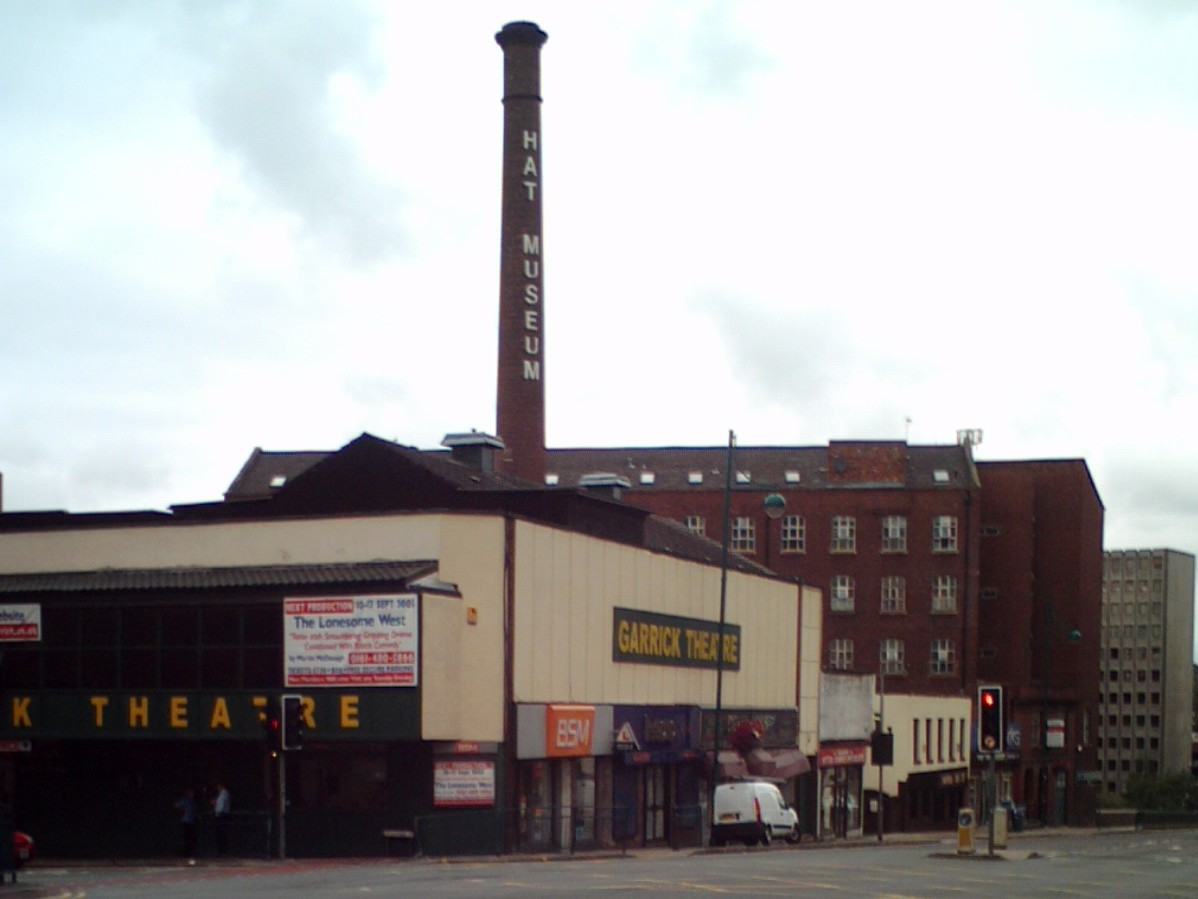
The Wellington Mill and the Garrick Theatre in 2008

== Ward Brothers ==
Ward Brothers moved into Wellington Mill in 1895 and stayed until the 1930s. Sarah Ward had opened a hat warehouse in 1848. They were specialists in hat finishing and trimming. They bought in the wool bodies from Denton and Stockport so needed no wet-end sheds. Little needed to be done to the cotton mill, though they did build a central staircase and a new eastern façade. Wards made stiff felts, soft felts, men's straws, boys straw's, tweed caps, workmen's hats and children's cloth, velvets, and plush hats.

== Museum ==
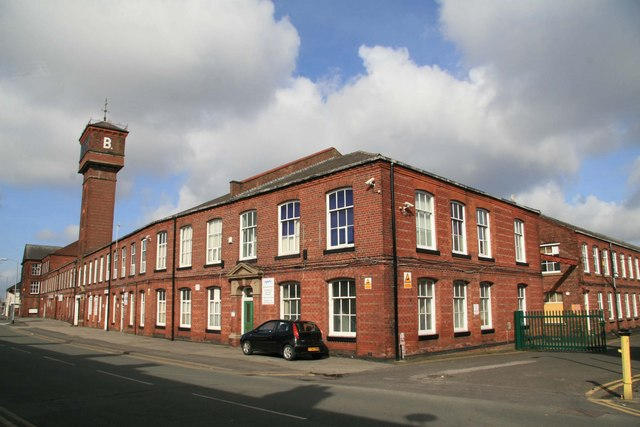
Battersby Hats, Hempshaw Lane; the former museum site in 2009

In 1966, the largest of the region's remaining felt hat manufacturers, Battersby & Co, T & W Lees, J. Moores & Sons, and Joseph Wilson & Sons, merged with Christy & Co to form Associated British Hat Manufacturers, leaving Christy's and Wilson's (at Denton) as the last two factories in production. The Wilson's factory closed in 1980, followed by the Christy's factory in 1997, bringing to an end over 400 years of hatting in the area. The industry is commemorated by the UK's only dedicated hatting museum, the Hat Works.

== See also ==
- Listed buildings in Stockport
- List of mills in Stockport
