= 1926 Grand Prix season =

Second AIACR World Manufacturers' Championship season

1926 AIACR World Manufacturers' Championship

Seasons
- ← 1925 1927 →

1926 Grand Prix season

Seasons
- ← 1925 1927 →

The 1926 Grand Prix season was the second AIACR World Manufacturers' Championship season and the first running to new 1.5-litre regulations. The championship was won by Bugatti and its Type 35 was the dominant car of the year.

The schedule was increased from four to five championship races. The Belgian round was dropped but the British Grand Prix and San Sebastián Grand Prix were added. Many races had promising entry lists, but when a number of cars did not arrive, it led to farcical races with just a handful of starters and only a couple of finishers.

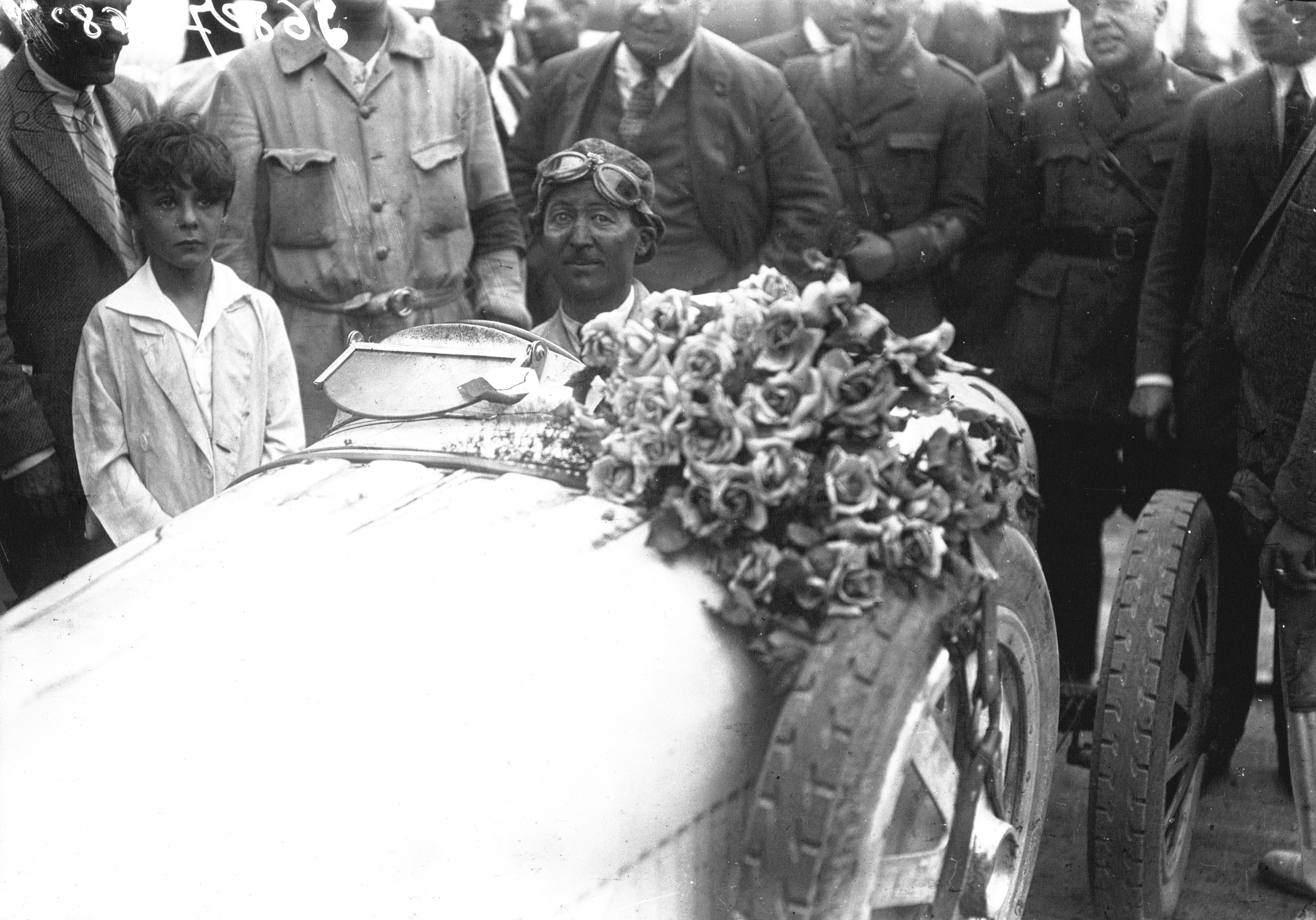
Jules Goux, winner of two Grands Prix

The leading French teams of Bugatti, Delage and Peugeot arrived for the Targa Florio as, once again, the major Italian teams did not enter. The race was marred by the death of two-time winner Giulio Masetti, crashing his privateer Delage on the first lap. Once again it was the small, nimble Bugatti of Bartolomeo Costantini that held off the rest of the pack. When the works Delage team was withdrawn following Masetti's death, it left Costantini led his team to a 1-2-3 victory.

The opening race of the championship was the Indianapolis 500. Frank Lockhart was a young rookie who substituted in to race for an ill Pete Kreis. Starting from back in the pack he soon joined the leaders and took the front on lap 60. On lap 71, rain forced a stop to the race for over an hour. Upon the restart, Lockhart built up his lead again, so at the 400-mile mark he had a 2-lap lead over the field. At that point rain returned, and he became the first rookie winner since 1914, in the rain-shortened race.

The European rounds of the championship were plagued by entry withdrawals of the works teams, leaving just a handful of starters to contest the races. The most embarrassing was the premier French Grand Prix where only the three Bugatti works cars started, and Jules Goux won, being the only classified finisher. The Delages were fast but poorly designed with the exhaust system placed right beside the drivers’ legs causing burns and exhaustion so that the team lost race-winning opportunities from numerable pit-stops to rest and recover. They did win the inaugural British Grand Prix as Bugatti did not enter and the new Talbots were still too under-developed. In the end, by virtue of being the only team to run the mandatory three races, Bugatti won the second Constructor's Championship.

Outside the championship, Formula Libre races (literally, open formula) were very popular across France and Italy and a number were staged with large fields of local drivers. Germany held its first Grand Prix, won by the young Rudolf Caracciola in difficult wet conditions that caused several serious accidents.

== Manufacturers' World Championship ==
Rnd	Date	Name	Circuit	Race Regulations	Weather	Race Distance	Winner's Time	Winning driver	Winning constructor	Fastest lap	Report
1	31 May	(United States) XIV International 500 Mile; Sweepstakes	Indianapolis	AAA	rain	(500 miles); 400 miles*	4h 15m	(United States) Frank Lockhart	Miller Type 91	not recorded	Report
2	27 Jun	(France) XX French Grand Prix	Miramas	AIACR	hot	510 km	4h 39m	(France) Jules Goux	Bugatti Type 39A	(France) Jules Goux; Bugatti	Report
3	18 Jul	(Spain) IV Gran Premio de San Sebastián / IV European Grand Prix	Lasarte	AIACR	hot	780 km	6h 52m	(France) Jules Goux	Bugatti Type 39A	(France) Louis Wagner; Delage	Report
4	7 Aug	(United Kingdom) I RAC Grand Prix	Brooklands	AIACR	fine	460 km	4h 01m	(France) Robert Sénéchal (France) Louis Wagner	Delage 15S8	(United Kingdom) Henry Segrave; Talbot	Report
5	5 Sep	(Italy) VI Italian Grand Prix	Monza	AIACR; Voiturette	sunny	600 km	4h 20m	(France) “Sabipa” (Louis Charavel)	Bugatti Type 39A	(Italy) Meo Constantini; Bugatti	Report

Note: *Race stopped because of weather

The Indianapolis 500 also counted towards the 1926 AAA Championship Car season held in the United States

== Other races ==
Major non-championship races are in bold Sources:

	Date	Name	Circuit	Race Regulations	Weather	Race Distance	Winner's Time	Winning driver	Winning constructor	Report
	21 Mar	(Italy) I Circuito del Pozzo	Verona	Formula Libre; Voiturette	cloudy then rain	250 km	2h 15m	(Italy) Alessandro Consonno	Bugatti Type 35	Report
A	**28 Mar**	(Italy) **II Premio Reale di Roma**	Valle Giulia	Formula Libre	fine	300 km	3h 01m	(Italy) Conte Aymo Maggi	Bugatti Type 35	Report
	**28 Mar**	(France) II Grand Prix de Provence	Miramas	Formula Libre; Voiturette	cloudy	250 km	1h 55m	(United Kingdom) Henry Segrave	Talbot 70	Report
B	**25 Apr**	(Italy) **IX Coppa Florio**	Medio Madonie	Targa Florio	sunny then cloudy	540 km	7h 21m	(Italy) Meo Constantini	Bugatti Type 35T	Report
B	**25 Apr**	(Italy) **XVII Targa Florio** (Note: The Targa Florio and the Coppa Florio were run simultaneously over the same route.)	Medio Madonie	Targa Florio	sunny then cloudy	540 km	7h 21m	(Italy) Meo Constantini	Bugatti Type 35T	Report
	29 Apr; 2 May	(Italian Libya) II Gran Premio di Tripoli	Tagiura	Formula Libre	sunny	390 km	3h 31m	(Tunisia) François Eysermann	Bugatti Type 35	Report
	2 May	(Italy) III Circuito di Alessandria	Alessandria	Formula Libre	fine	260 km	2h 49m	(Italy) Giovanni Alloatti	Bugatti Type 22 Brescia	Report
	2 May	(Italy) II Coppa Vinci	Messina	Formula Libre	sunny	260 km	3h 42m	(Italy) Renato Balestrero	OM 665 S	Report
	9 May	(Italy) I Coppa Etna	Catania	Formula Libre	sunny	350 km	3h 54m	(Italy) Conte Aymo Maggi	Bugatti Type 35A	Report
	23 May	(Italy) IV Circuito del Savio	Ravenna	Formula Libre; Cyclecar	sunny	290 km	2h 21m	(Italy) Conte Gastone Brilli-Peri	Ballot Indianapolis 1919	Report
	30 May	(Italy) III Coppa della Perugina	Perugia	Formula Libre	sunny	300 km	2h 38m	(Italy) Emilio Materassi	Itala Special 5.8L	Report
	12 Jun	(Germany) V Eifelrennen	Nideggen	Formula Libre; Sports Cars	sunny	400 km	6h 07m	(Germany) Gustav Münz	Ford 3.0L Spezial	Report
	27 Jun	(Italy) I Coppa del Marchese Ginori	Florence	Formula Libre	?	240 km	2h 03m	(Italy) Emilio Materassi	Itala Special 5.8L	Report
	11 Jul	(Germany) I German Grand Prix	AVUS	Formula Libre; Sports Cars	fine then heavy rain	390 km	2h 54m	(Germany) Rudolf Caracciola	Mercedes 1924 GP	Report
	18 Jul	(Italy) I Circuito di Camaiore	Lucca	Formula Libre; Cyclecar	?	190 km	2h 40m	(Italy) Baconin Borzacchini	Salmson VAL	Report
C	**25 Jul**	(Spain) **II Spanish Grand Prix**	Lasarte	Formula Libre	fine then showers	690 km	5h 36m	(Italy) Meo Constantini	Bugatti Type 35	Report
	**25 Jul**	(France) II Grand Prix de la Marne	Reims-Gueux	Formula Libre	fine then rain	320 km	2h 50m	(France) François Lescot	Bugatti Type 35	Report
	1 Aug	(France) II Grand Prix du Comminges	Saint-Gaudens	Formula Libre		410 km	3h 58m	(Monaco) Louis Chiron	Bugatti Type 35	Report
	7 Aug	(Italy) III Coppa Acerbo	Pescara	Formula Libre	hot	510 km	5h 03m	(Italy) Luigi Spinozzi	Bugatti Type 35	Report
D	**15 Aug**	(Italy) **VI Coppa Montenero**	Montenero	Formula Libre	sunny	225 km	2h 55m	(Italy) Emilio Materassi	Itala Special 5.8L	Report
E	**27 Aug**; **28 Aug**	(France) **VI Grand Prix de Boulogne**	Boulogne-sur-Mer	Voiturette	sunny	450 km	4h 21m	(United Kingdom) Capt George Eyston	Bugatti Type 39	Report
	28 Aug	(France) III Grand Prix de la Baule	La Baule	Formula Libre	?	100 km	51m	(France) Louis Wagner	Delage 2LCV	Report
	5 Sep	(Italy) IV Gran Premio del Vetturette	Monza	Voiturette	sunny	400 km	3h 01m	(France) André Morel	Amilcar 6C	Report
F	**12 Sep**	(Italy) **I Gran Premio di Milano**	Monza	Formula Libre	fine	400 km	2h 36m	(Italy) Meo Constantini	Bugatti Type 35C	Report
	**12 Sep**	(France) II Grand Prix du Moto Club de Marseille	La Baule	Formula Libre	?	50 km	29m	(France) “Foc”	Bugatti Type 37	Report
	**12 Sep**	(Germany) II Solituderennen	Solitude	Formula Libre	rain	450 km	4h 50m	(Germany) Otto Merz	Mercedes 1924 GP	Report
	20 Sep	(Italy) I Circuito Ligure-Piemontese	Novi Ligure	Formula Libre; Touring	sunny	270 km	2h 15m	(Italy) Federico Valpreda	Chiribiri Monza C	Report
G	**25 Sep**	(United Kingdom) **VI Junior Car Club 200**	Brooklands	AIACR; Voiturette	cold	200 miles	2h 40m	(United Kingdom) Henry Segrave	Talbot 700 GPLB	Report
	17 Oct	(Italy) VI Circuito del Garda	Salò	Formula Libre	sunny	250 km	2h 50m	(Italy) Conte Aymo Maggi	Bugatti Type 35C	Report
	17 Oct	(France) I Grand Prix du Salon	Montlhéry	AIACR	rain	200 km	1h 59m	(France) Albert Divo	Talbot 700 GPLB	Report

== Teams and drivers ==
Entrant	Constructor	Chassis	Engine	Tyre	Driver	Rounds
(Italy) Alfa Corse	Alfa Romeo	P2 8C/2000	Alfa Romeo 2.0L S8 s/c		(Italy) Conte Gastone Brilli-Peri	A
(Italy) Alfa Corse	Alfa Romeo	P2 8C/2000	Alfa Romeo 2.0L S8 s/c		(Italy) Conte Giovanni Bonmartini	A
(France) Usines Bugatti	Bugatti	Type 39A; Type 35; Type 35C	Bugatti 1.5L S8 s/c Bugatti 2.0L S8; Bugatti 2.0L S8 s/c		(Italy) Meo Constantini	2, 3, 5; B, C, F
(France) Usines Bugatti	Bugatti	Type 39A; Type 35; Type 35C	Bugatti 1.5L S8 s/c Bugatti 2.0L S8; Bugatti 2.0L S8 s/c		(France) Jules Goux	2, 3, 5; B. C, F
(France) Usines Bugatti	Bugatti	Type 39A; Type 35; Type 35C	Bugatti 1.5L S8 s/c Bugatti 2.0L S8; Bugatti 2.0L S8 s/c		(Spain) Pierre de Vizcaya	2
(France) Usines Bugatti	Bugatti	Type 39A; Type 35; Type 35C	Bugatti 1.5L S8 s/c Bugatti 2.0L S8; Bugatti 2.0L S8 s/c		(Italy) Ferdinando Minoia	3; B, C
(France) Usines Bugatti	Bugatti	Type 39A; Type 35; Type 35C	Bugatti 1.5L S8 s/c Bugatti 2.0L S8; Bugatti 2.0L S8 s/c		(France) Louis Dutilleux	3*
(France) Usines Bugatti	Bugatti	Type 39A; Type 35; Type 35C	Bugatti 1.5L S8 s/c Bugatti 2.0L S8; Bugatti 2.0L S8 s/c		(France) “Sabipa” (Louis Charavel)	5
(France) Automobiles Delage	Delage	15 S8; 2LCV	Delage 1.5L S8 s/c Delage 2.0L V12 s/c		(France) Robert Benoist	[2], 3, 4; B, C
(France) Automobiles Delage	Delage	15 S8; 2LCV	Delage 1.5L S8 s/c Delage 2.0L V12 s/c		(France) Edmond Bourlier	[2], 3
(France) Automobiles Delage	Delage	15 S8; 2LCV	Delage 1.5L S8 s/c Delage 2.0L V12 s/c		(France) André Morel	3; C
(France) Automobiles Delage	Delage	15 S8; 2LCV	Delage 1.5L S8 s/c Delage 2.0L V12 s/c		(France) Louis Wagner	3*, 4; C
(France) Automobiles Delage	Delage	15 S8; 2LCV	Delage 1.5L S8 s/c Delage 2.0L V12 s/c		(France) Robert Sénéchal	3*, 4
(France) Automobiles Delage	Delage	15 S8; 2LCV	Delage 1.5L S8 s/c Delage 2.0L V12 s/c		(France) André Dubonnet	4
(France) Automobiles Delage	Delage	15 S8; 2LCV	Delage 1.5L S8 s/c Delage 2.0L V12 s/c		(France) Albert Divo	B
(France) Automobiles Delage	Delage	15 S8; 2LCV	Delage 1.5L S8 s/c Delage 2.0L V12 s/c		(France) René Thomas	B
(United States) Duesenberg Bros	Duesenberg	Type 91	Duesenberg 1.5L S8 s/c	F	(United States) Peter DePaolo	1
(United States) Duesenberg Bros	Duesenberg	Type 91	Duesenberg 1.5L S8 s/c	F	(United States) Ben Jones	1
(United States) Miller Automobiles	Miller	Type 91	Miller 1.5L S8 s/c	F	(United States) Earl Cooper	1
(United States) Miller Automobiles	Miller	Type 91	Miller 1.5L S8 s/c	F	(United States) Bennett Hill	1
(United States) Miller Automobiles	Miller	Type 91	Miller 1.5L S8 s/c	F	(United States) Dave Lewis	1
(United States) Chevrolet Bros	Ford-Frontenac	Model T	Frontenac 1.5L	F	(United States) Jack McCarver	1
(United States) Locomobile Junior 8	Fengler	Junior 8	Locomobile 1.5L	F	(United States) Cliff Durant	1
(United States) Locomobile Junior 8	Fengler	Junior 8	Locomobile 1.5L	F	(United States) “Leon Duray”	1
(United States) Locomobile Junior 8	Fengler	Junior 8	Locomobile 1.5L	F	(United States) Eddie Hearne	1*
(United States) Harry Hartz	Miller	Type 91	Miller 1.5L S8 s/c	F	(United States) Harry Hartz	1
(United States) Harry Hartz	Miller	Type 91	Miller 1.5L S8 s/c	F	(United States) Fred Comer	1
(United States) Harry Hartz	Miller	Type 91	Miller 1.5L S8 s/c	F	(United States) Tony Gulotta	1
(United States) Harry Hartz	Miller	Type 91	Miller 1.5L S8 s/c	F	(United States) Wade Morton	1*
(United States) Albert Schmidt	Schmidt		Argyle 1.5L	F	(United States) Lora L. Corum	1
(United States) Albert Schmidt	Schmidt		Argyle 1.5L	F	(United States) Steve Nemesh	1
(France) Ste Industrielle de Materiel; Automobile	SIMA		Violet 1.5L F4 2-stroke Violet 750cc F2 2-stroke		(France) Marcel Violet	[2], [3], [5]; [C], E
(France) Ste Industrielle de Materiel; Automobile	SIMA		Violet 1.5L F4 2-stroke Violet 750cc F2 2-stroke		(France) Michel Doré	[2], [3], [5]; [C], [E]
(France) Ste Industrielle de Materiel; Automobile	SIMA		Violet 1.5L F4 2-stroke Violet 750cc F2 2-stroke		(France) Max Fourny	[2], [3], [5]; [C]
(France) Ste Industrielle de Materiel; Automobile	SIMA		Violet 1.5L F4 2-stroke Violet 750cc F2 2-stroke		(France) Maurice Benoist	[5]; E
(France) Ste Industrielle de Materiel; Automobile	SIMA		Violet 1.5L F4 2-stroke Violet 750cc F2 2-stroke		(United Kingdom) . Stanton	E
(France) STD Motors Ltd (United Kingdom)	Talbot Sunbeam Sunbeam	700 GPLB; GP.	Talbot 1.5L S4 s/c Sunbeam 2.0L S4 s/c Sunbeam 4.0L V12 s/c		(United Kingdom) Henry Segrave	[2], [3], 4, [5]; C, D, G
(France) STD Motors Ltd (United Kingdom)	Talbot Sunbeam Sunbeam	700 GPLB; GP.	Talbot 1.5L S4 s/c Sunbeam 2.0L S4 s/c Sunbeam 4.0L V12 s/c		(France) Albert Divo	[2], [3], 4, [5]; A, [E], G
(France) STD Motors Ltd (United Kingdom)	Talbot Sunbeam Sunbeam	700 GPLB; GP.	Talbot 1.5L S4 s/c Sunbeam 2.0L S4 s/c Sunbeam 4.0L V12 s/c		(France) Jules Moriceau	[2], [3], 4, [5]; E*, G
(France) STD Motors Ltd (United Kingdom)	Talbot Sunbeam Sunbeam	700 GPLB; GP.	Talbot 1.5L S4 s/c Sunbeam 2.0L S4 s/c Sunbeam 4.0L V12 s/c		(Czech Republic) Hugo Urban-Emmerich	E
(France) SA des Automobiles; Jean Graf	Jean Graf	Spéciale	CIME 1.5L S4		(France) Jean Graf	[3], [5]; [C], F
(France) SA des Automobiles; Jean Graf	Jean Graf	Spéciale	CIME 1.5L S4		(United Kingdom) William Grover-Williams	[3]
(France) SA des Automobiles; Jean Graf	Jean Graf	Spéciale	CIME 1.5L S4		(France) ? . Maleterre	F
(France) SA des Automobiles; Jean Graf	Jean Graf	Spéciale	CIME 1.5L S4		(France) ? . Coudray	[F]
(Italy) Officine Meccaniche	O.M.	Tipo 865 GP; Tipo 665 S	O.M. 1.5L S8; O.M. 2.2L S6		(Italy) Ferdinando Minoia	[3], [4], [G]
(Italy) Officine Meccaniche	O.M.	Tipo 865 GP; Tipo 665 S	O.M. 1.5L S8; O.M. 2.2L S6		(Italy) Giuseppe Morandi	[3], [4], [G]
(Italy) Officine Meccaniche	O.M.	Tipo 865 GP; Tipo 665 S	O.M. 1.5L S8; O.M. 2.2L S6		(Italy) Renato Balestrero	[3], [D]
(Italy) Officine Meccaniche	O.M.	Tipo 865 GP; Tipo 665 S	O.M. 1.5L S8; O.M. 2.2L S6		(United Kingdom) ? Dick Oates	[G]
(United Kingdom) Alvis Car & Engineering Co	Alvis	GP	Alvis 1.5L S8 s/c		(United Kingdom) Maurice Harvey	[4]; G
(United Kingdom) Alvis Car & Engineering Co	Alvis	GP	Alvis 1.5L S8 s/c		(United Kingdom) Earl of Cottenham	G
(United Kingdom) Bamford & Martin Ltd	Aston Martin	GP	Aston Martin 1.5L S8		(United Kingdom) George Eyston	4
(United Kingdom) Bamford & Martin Ltd	Aston Martin	GP	Aston Martin 1.5L S8		(United Kingdom) Basil Eyston	G
(Italy) Fab. Torinese Velivoli; Chiribiri & Cie	Chiribiri	12/16 Monza	Chiribiri 1.5L S4 s/c		(Italy) Umberto Serboli	5
(Italy) Fab. Torinese Velivoli; Chiribiri & Cie	Chiribiri	12/16 Monza	Chiribiri 1.5L S4 s/c		(Italy) Luigi Platé	[5]
(Italy) Officine Alfieri Maserati SpA	Maserati	Tipo 26	Maserati 1.5L S8 s/c		(Italy) Ernesto Maserati	5; F
(Italy) Officine Alfieri Maserati SpA	Maserati	Tipo 26	Maserati 1.5L S8 s/c		(Italy) Emilio Materassi	5; F
(Italy) Officine Alfieri Maserati SpA	Maserati	Tipo 26	Maserati 1.5L S8 s/c		(Italy) Guido Meregalli	[5]
(Italy) Officine Alfieri Maserati SpA	Maserati	Tipo 26	Maserati 1.5L S8 s/c		(Italy) Alfieri Maserati	B
(France) SA des Autos et Cycles; Peugeot	Peugeot	Type 174 Sport	Peugeot 3.8L S4		(France) André Boillot	B
(France) SA des Autos et Cycles; Peugeot	Peugeot	Type 174 Sport	Peugeot 3.8L S4		(France) Louis Wagner	B
(Italy) Sta Ceirano; Automobili Torino	Ceirano	N150S	Ceirano 1.5L		(Italy) Luigi Beccaria	D
(Italy) Sta Ceirano; Automobili Torino	Ceirano	N150S	Ceirano 1.5L		(Italy) Paolo Pavesio	D
(Italy) Sta Ceirano; Automobili Torino	Ceirano	N150S	Ceirano 1.5L		(Italy) Gusmano Pieranzi	D
(Italy) Sta Ceirano; Automobili Torino	Ceirano	N150S	Ceirano 1.5L		(Italy) Pietro Cattaneo	[D]
(Italy) Sta Ceirano; Automobili Torino	Ceirano	N150S	Ceirano 1.5L		(Italy) ? Aldo Colombo	[D]
(France) Société des Moteurs; Salmson	Salmson	VAL	Salmson 1.1L S4		(United Kingdom) George Duller	E
(France) Société des Moteurs; Salmson	Salmson	VAL	Salmson 1.1L S4		(France) ? . Bourdan	E
(France) Société des Moteurs; Salmson	Salmson	VAL	Salmson 1.1L S4		(United Kingdom) George Newman	E
(France) Société des Moteurs; Salmson	Salmson	VAL	Salmson 1.1L S4		(France) Georges Casse	G
(France) Société des Moteurs; Salmson	Salmson	VAL	Salmson 1.1L S4		(France) Pierre Goutte	G
(France) Société des Moteurs; Salmson	Salmson	VAL	Salmson 1.1L S4		(France) Lionel de Marmier	G
(France) Société Nouvelle de l'Automobile Amilcar	Amilcar	C6	Amilcar 1.1L S6		(France) André Morel	[D], G
(France) Société Nouvelle de l'Automobile Amilcar	Amilcar	C6	Amilcar 1.1L S6		(France) Charles Martin	G
(France) Société Nouvelle de l'Automobile Amilcar	Amilcar	C6	Amilcar 1.1L S6		(France) Arthur Duray	G
(France) Société Nouvelle de l'Automobile Amilcar	Amilcar	C6	Amilcar 1.1L S6		(United Kingdom) ? Bill Humphreys	[G]

=== Significant Privateer drivers ===
Entrant	Constructor	Chassis	Engine	Driver	Rounds
Private Entrant	Eldridge	Special	Anzani 1.5L S4	(United Kingdom) Ernest Eldridge	1, 3; [C]
Private Entrant	Guyot	Spéciale	Schmid 2.0L S6 sleeve-valve supercharged	(France) Albert Guyot	1, 3; [C]
Private Entrant	Miller	Type 122	Miller 2.0L S8 s/c	(United States) Ralph Hepburn	1
Private Entrant	Miller	Type 122	Miller 2.0L S8 s/c	(United States) Frank Lockhart	1
Private Entrant	Bugatti	Type 39A	Bugatti 1.5L S8 s/c	(United Kingdom) Capt Malcolm Campbell	4; [E], G
Private Entrant	Halford	Special	Halford 1.5L S6 s/c	(United Kingdom) Maj Frank Halford	4; G
Private Entrant	Itala Special	55	Hispano-Suiza 5.8L S4	(Italy) Emilio Materassi	A, B, D
Private Entrant	Sunbeam Delage	GP; 2LCV	Sunbeam 2.0L S4 s/c Delage 2.0L V12 s/c	(Italy) Conte Giulio Masetti	A, B
Private Entrant	Bugatti	Type 35; Type 35C	Bugatti 2.0L S8; Bugatti 2.0L S8 s/c	(Italy) Conte Aymo Maggi	A, D
Private Entrant	Bugatti	Type 35	Bugatti 2.0L S8	(Italy) Franco Mazzotti	A, D
Private Entrant	Salmson	VAL	Salmson 1.1L S4	(Italy) Baconin Borzacchini	B, D
Private Entrant	Bugatti	Type 35T	Bugatti 2.3L S8	(United Kingdom) William Grover-Williams	C, [E]
Private Entrant	Alfa Romeo	RL Targa Florio	Alfa Romeo 3.0L S6	(Italy) Bruno Presenti	D
Private Entrant	Bugatti	Type 35	Bugatti 2.0L S8	(Monaco) Louis Chiron	F

Note: * was raced as a relief driver. Those in brackets show, although entered, the driver did not race

== Regulations and Technical ==
The racing death of star Antonio Ascari in 1925, along with a number of serious and fatal accidents drove the AIACR (forerunner of the FIA) to consider changes to its racing regulations. In October of that year, they resolved to combat the dramatic increase in power and speed from supercharging by dropping the engine capacity from 2-litres to 1.5-litres (albeit still open to be fitted with or without a supercharger). The minimum weight was also reduced from 650 to 600 kg. The AAA Contest Board (AAA), in the United States, followed the change adopting similar rules, to an equivalent drop from 122 to 91 cubic inches. Minimum width remained 80 cm with two seats, though only one driver was on board.

For the second year of the Championship, the Belgian Grand Prix was not held this year but two new races were added to the schedule in its stead. Brooklands had resolved its noise-control issues with neighbouring estates and would host the first British Grand Prix. The European Grand Prix was awarded to the Spanish Automobile Club. However, the promoters were concerned the 1.5-litre formula would be poorly supported and therefore also arranged a second race (held a week later) to Formula Libre regulations that would be their official Spanish Grand Prix. This year, along with the mandatory attendance of the Italian GP, teams had to also participate in any two of the other four races to be eligible for the championship.

Meanwhile, the regulations for the Targa Florio engine limits remained as they were. Like Grand Prix events, riding mechanics were now optional. Once again, the Targa Florio and Coppa Florio were held simultaneously, and this year both events were run over the same five laps. The Coppa Florio was only open to factory teams who had registered. After Peugeot became the first manufacturer to win the Coppa Florio twice they earned its permanent ownership. However, they chose to offer it up for ongoing challenges if it would be contested alternately in Italy and France. In May, the cities of Milan and Turin changed their rules of driving on the left side of the road to line up with the rest of Italy that drove on the right.

=== Technical Innovation ===
The new regulations demanded new engines and pushed engineers to think of innovative ways to get the same power from the smaller size. By using a shorter stroke, engines could greatly increase their speed, up to 7000-8000rpm.

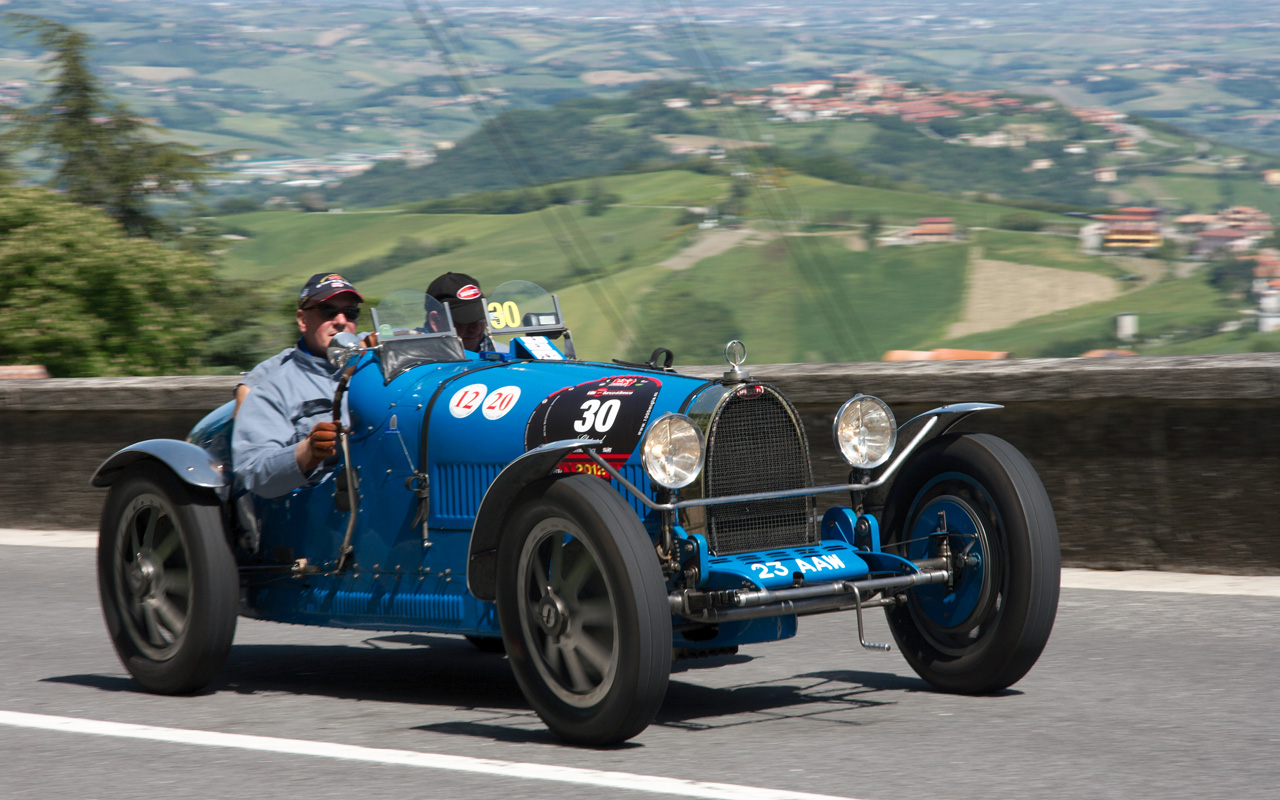
Bugatti Type 35T

Faced with high development costs, Alfa Romeo and Sunbeam instead chose to retire their works teams from racing. Other teams were already prepared. Ettore Bugatti had developed his Type 35 chassis the previous year with a 1.5-litre engine, and finally accepted the need for supercharging with the new Type 39A. Although conventional, the Bugatti was reliable (only running at 5500rpm for its 120 bhp) with excellent balance and road-holding. In non-championship, Formula Libre races, Bugatti still refused to conform to supercharging the Type 35, instead chose to enlarge the engine to get more power, up to 2.3 litres as the new Type 35T. The marque's reliability made them the cars of choice for privateer drivers and wealthy amateurs.

Sunbeam's designer, Louis Coatalen, and engineer, Vincenzo Bertarione, went across to the Paris-based sister-company of Talbot. Their 1.5-litre cars had been racing very successfully in the former voiturette class. The new supercharged Talbot 700 GPLB was delayed in appearing but was the fastest in the field. Problems arose through the season with broken front axles, poor brakes and fractured supercharger casings.

Delage too had a new head engineer: Albert Lory was promoted, and his first design was a straight-8, twin-cam engine boosted by two superchargers. The power output of 170 bhp was the first racing engine to break the magical 100 bhp per litre mark. But with sixty bearings it was intricate and expensive. Less thought was put into channelling away the enormous heat production that would scold and burn the drivers’ feet and legs. It also caused a vacuum effect that sucked exhaust fumes back into the cockpit adding to their discomfort.

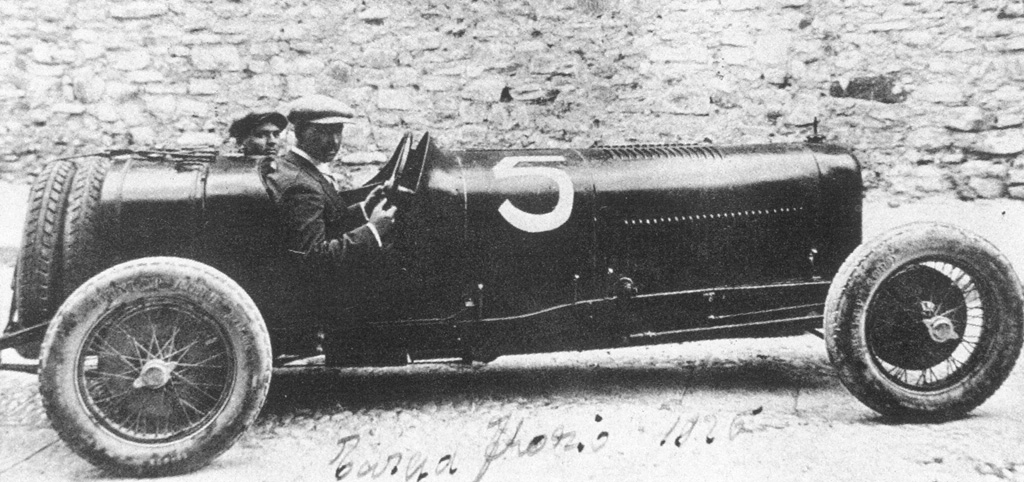
Maserati Tipo 26

Without the need for a riding mechanic, both the Talbot and Delage designs put the drivetrain beside, rather than under, the driver. This in turn meant the cars could be lower giving far better road-holding. The smaller front profile would be more aerodynamic, and all of this enabled the cars to keep their high speeds.

The SIMA-Violet car was designed by Marcel Violet. With a two-stroke 1.5-litre engine, it was so light it needed to carry 200 kg of ballast to reach the weight regulations, which made it uncompetitive. However, it performed better in hill-climb events where no ballast was required. Diatto had got into financial difficulty, which was the incentive for the Maserati brothers to go and start their own company. They were supported in this venture by Conte Diego de Sterlich. Using the engine and chassis parts Alfieri had designed for the last Diatto racer, their first grand prix car was the Maserati Tipo 26, named for the current year. Like others it had twin-overhead camshafts and a Roots-style supercharger.

In Germany, the two major companies Daimler and Benz merged in June and would henceforth be known as Daimler-Benz, and its cars as Mercedes-Benz. In the US, both Harry Miller and Fred Duesenberg developed supercharged 1.5-litre engines for the new formula.

Manufacturer	Model	Engine	Power Output	Max. Speed (km/h)	Dry Weight (kg)
(France) Bugatti	Type 39A	Bugatti 1492cc S8 supercharged	120 bhp	190	740
(France) Delage	15 S8	Delage 1487cc S8 supercharged	170 bhp	210	750
(France) / (United Kingdom) Talbot	700 GPLB	Talbot 1489cc S4 supercharged	140 bhp	210	700
(Italy) Maserati	Tipo 26	Maserati 1491cc S8 supercharged	120 bhp	200	720
(Italy) Officine Meccaniche	865 GP	OM 1496cc S8 supercharged	118 bhp	195	715
(United States) Miller	Type 91	Miller 1468cc S8 supercharged	154 bhp		
(United States) Duesenberg	Type 91	Duesenberg 1.5L S8 supercharged			
(United Kingdom) Aston Martin		Aston Martin 1486cc S4	55 bhp	160	660
(Italy) Chiribiri	12/16 Monza	Chiribiri 1453cc S4 supercharged	95 bhp	165	

== Season review ==
The French works teams returned to Italy for the Targa Florio. The Coppa Florio was run in conjunction with it – open to works teams only, unlike the Targa. Both were run over five laps while the smallest, 1100cc cars only ran three laps. Peugeot ran two of its successful 174 S 4-litre sports cars for André Boillot and Louis Wagner. Delage had three of its 1925 grand-prix cars with René Thomas, Albert Divo and Robert Benoist. Bugatti had yet another iteration of its Type 35, the Type 35T with a 2.3-litre engine. The drivers were the team-leader Bartolomeo Costantini, veteran Jules Goux and Ferdinando Minoia. The French were competing against a solid field of privateers, led by the local hero, and two-time winner, Conte Giulio Masetti racing another Delage, Emilio Materassi in his 5.8-litre Itala Special and Renato Balestrero in a works-supported OM. Alfieri Maserati also arrived with his brand new Tipo 26.

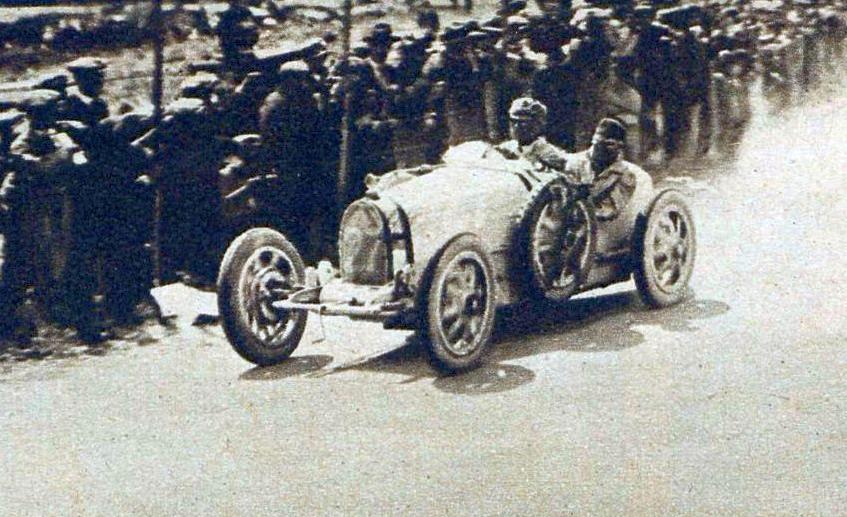
Targa Florio: Meo Costantini

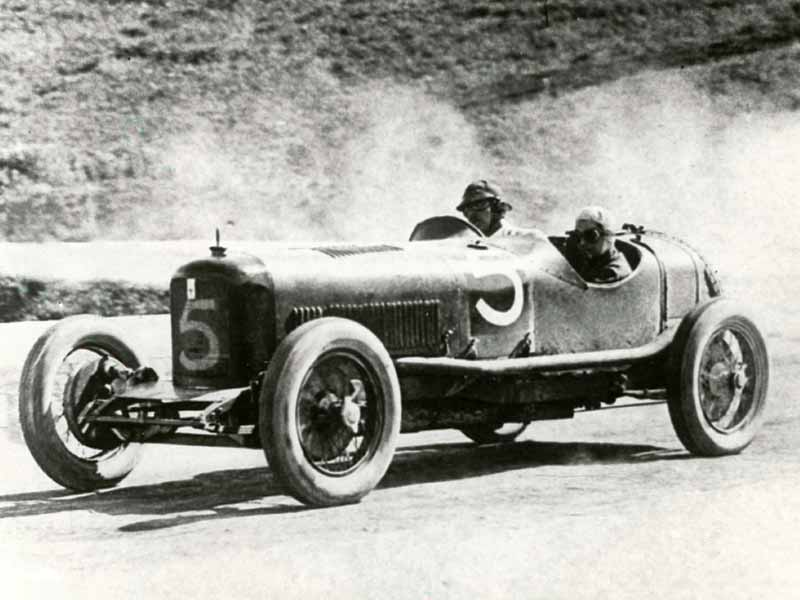
Targa Florio: Alfieri Maserati

The race started at 7am, with the cars flagged off at 3-minute intervals. At the end of the first lap, Costantini (the 1925 winner) led from Minoia, with Materassi, Wagner, Dubonnet, Divo, Goux and Maserati all about 3 minutes behind on elapsed time. Boillot hit a dog and had to retire his Peugeot. But the biggest tragedy was when Masetti crashed only 27 km into the race. He went wide at a corner (possibly from a steering or brake fault), rode up the stone banking and rolled, fatally crushing Masetti against the steering wheel. The three works Delages were withdrawn as they got the news. The Bugattis continued to build their lead over the next laps while Goux moved up the field to third. Costantini kept up his pace and led home a 1-2-3 finish for Bugatti, becoming a two-time winner. Maserati was 8th, winning the 1500cc class.

=== Indianapolis ===
The opening race of the championship was the Indianapolis 500. Defending champions, Duesenberg had five cars entered. Last year's winner Peter DePaolo ran its new supercharged 1.5-litre model along with Ralph Mulford and Bob McDonogh while rookie Ben Jones had a 2-stroke special. Their biggest rivals, once again, was from Harry Miller and his own new supercharged 91 cubic inch car. After a strong run in 1925, Miller persisted with his front-wheel drive model for Dave Lewis and Earl Cooper. Bennett Hill raced a regular 122 as a third works car. The regular customer team run by Harry Hartz had three cars for Hartz, Fred Comer and Tony Gulotta while another dozen drivers also ran their own Millers. This year, Cliff Durant's Junior-8 team ran three Fengler cars with Locomobile engines for himself, Leon Duray and Harlan Fengler. Englishman Ernest Eldridge also arrived with two of his home-made specials raced by himself and Douglas Hawkes.

Forty cars were entered to qualify but it was marred by the death of Herbert Jones. The 22-year old was the youngest driver in the field. He had Ralph DePalma’s Miller from 1925 (renamed an Elcar Special) but crashed on his second qualifying lap when he clipped the inside wall at speed. The car rolled trapping Jones underneath and he died of his injuries the next day. After qualifying, Cooper had the fastest time, sharing the front row with Hartz and Duray's Fengler with a field of 28 cars. Three Duesenbergs failed to qualify, including the 10-race veteran Mulford. Fengler was another who failed to qualify. Pete Kreis was too ill with flu and handed his drive over to young rookie Frank Lockhart who had shown great speed qualifying as a relief driver.

In front of a record crowd of 145,000, Hartz led the first lap, but Phil Shafer from the second row then overtook him. Meanwhile, Lockhart had quickly moved from 20th to 5th in the first five laps. He, Shafer and Lewis then duelled for the lead over the next 150 miles. When Lewis pitted on lap 60, Lockhart took the lead. He was still leading on lap 71 when heavy rain forced a red flag, stopping the race for an hour. When it resumed, the Millers of Lockhart and Hartz vied back and forth for the lead. Lewis retired on lap 91 with engine issues. But the rain hung around and returned after 200 miles, when the race was stopped again. Lockhart had a two-lap lead over Hartz and was declared the winner in the rain-shortened race. Miller had its first Indy-500 victory, and took the first four places with Pete DePaolo, finishing 5th in the first Duesenberg. Lockhart was the first rookie to win the race since 1914 and split the $34000 prizemoney with Kreis. Hartz was second for the third time in five years. The 1926 AAA championship was raced over 24 events at seven speedways. Lockhart went on to claim four other wins, tied with Harry Hartz who also had five victories. Hartz, however, was more consistent with 17 top-five placings to comfortably win the AAA championship.

=== European farce ===
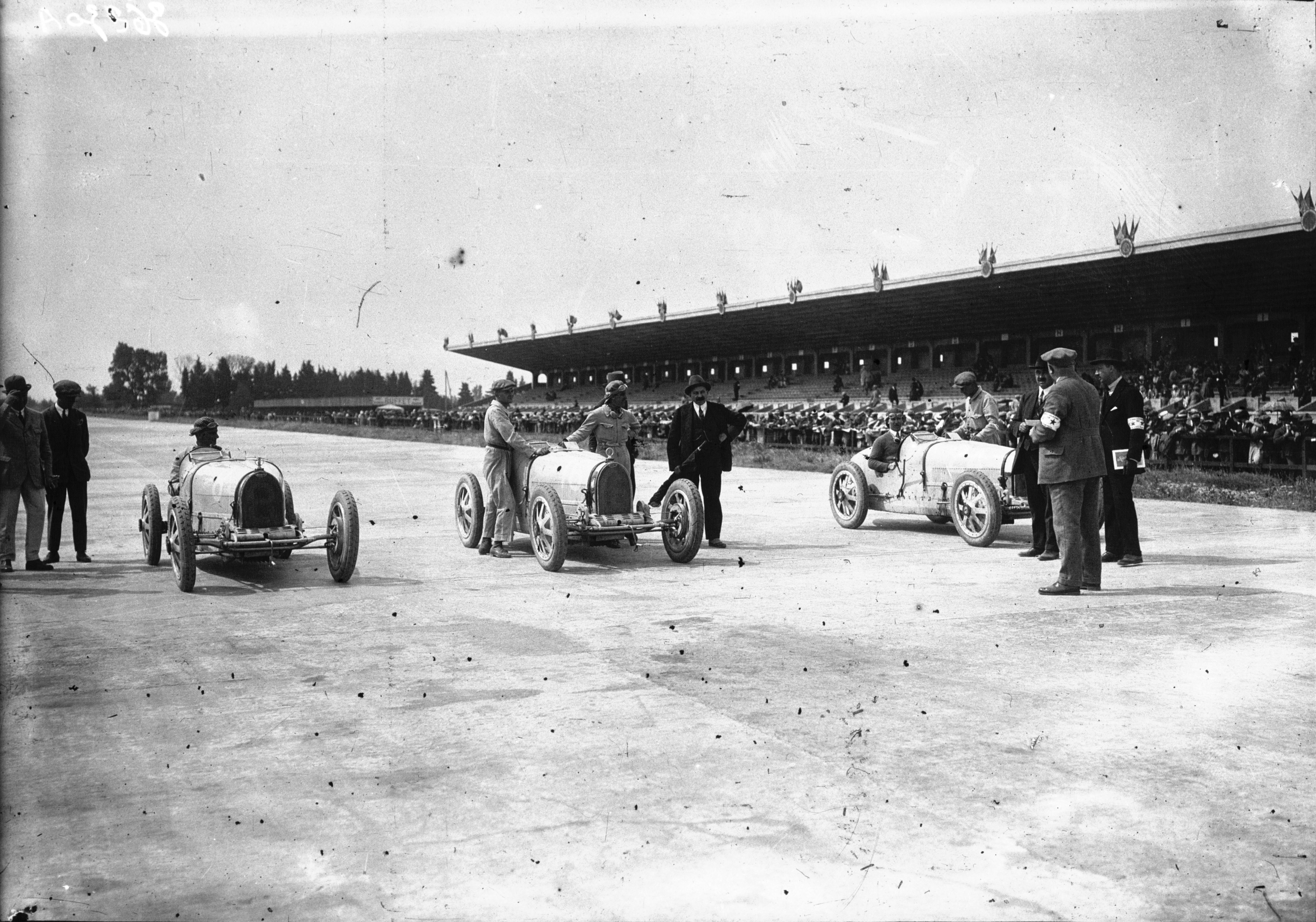
The sole starters for the French Grand Prix

Just the second year into such a prestigious international tournament, the 1926 season was quite a debacle. The first European round of the World Championship was the French Grand Prix – this year held at the very fast Miramas oval in the south. To reduce speeds, hairpin corners were put at each end. Despite being held in the middle of the year, neither Delage or Talbot were ready and did not arrive. When the small French SIMA-Violet team also pulled out, it left the farcical situation where only the Bugatti works team of three cars arrived for the premier event of the year. The organisers had forgotten to include a clause allowing them to cancel (or at least postpone) the Grand Prix. What followed was one of the most embarrassing World Championship races ever held in any era. Regular Bugatti drivers Costantini and Goux were joined by Spaniard Pierre de Vizcaya. De Vizcaya's supercharger gave out before half time, falling an hour behind. Costantini had also lost ten minutes in the pits when his car would not restart, so Goux had a comfortable lead. The two cars circulated the track for the next three hours, with Costantini also having supercharger problems and stopping every other lap to cool the engine. Goux won by sixteen laps as the sole classified finisher, but at least it gave the Bugatti team the handsome prize of FF100,000. By contrast, the cyclecar race in the afternoon had over 30 entries, won by Salmson over the new challenge from Amilcar.

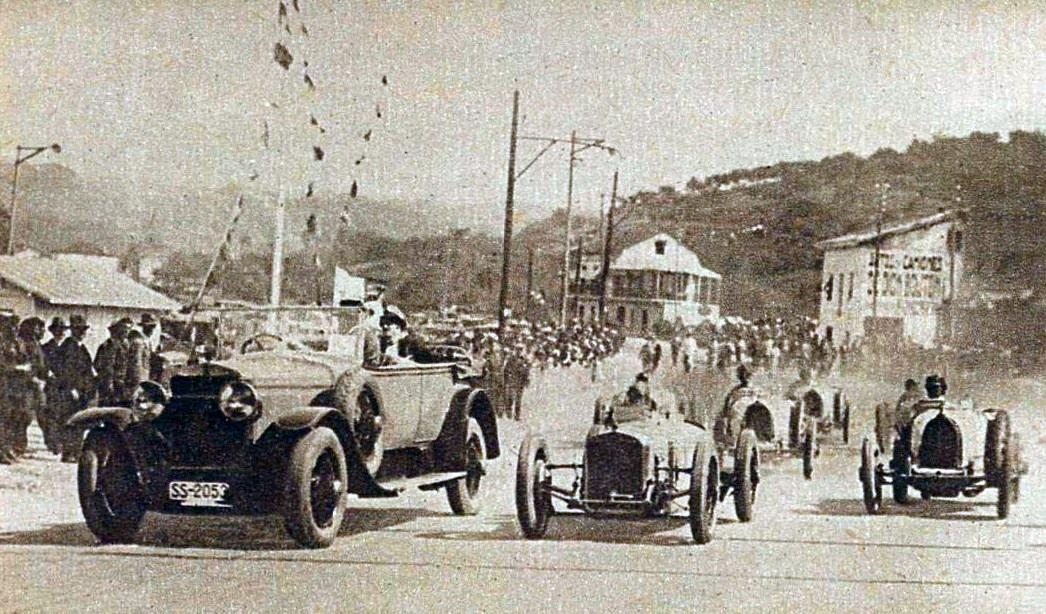
Just after the start of the San Sebastián GP, as the field overtakes the pace-car

The next round, three weeks later, was the San Sebastián Grand Prix. Another promising entry list of 21 was once again stymied by non-appearances, this time also including OM, Jean Gras and the privateers Albert Guyot and Ernest Eldridge. Delage did arrive with their new cars and team drivers Robert Benoist, Edmond Bourlier and André Morel, with Louis Wagner as a reserve. The Bugatti team had three cars, with Ferdinando Minoia back for De Vizcaya. During practice in the hot Spanish sun, the Delage drivers soon found the exhaust and engine heat unbearably hot. The mechanics drilled holes in the engine covers, but it proved unsuccessful. On a sweltering 44 °C race-day, all three drivers were overcome by the heat and had to pit. Benoist had led the first six laps until he had to stop to change spark plus, as Minoia had a lap earlier. Morel took over the lead and pitted to refuel on lap 10. Overcome by heat exhaustion he was taken to hospital, while Wagner took over his car, but he only lasted five laps. Benoist pitted on lap 12, also totally exhausted. Sometime-Bugatti driver, Robert Sénéchal was in the crowd at the race and offered his assistance to Louis Delâge. Gratefully accepted, he took over Benoist's car, rejoining two laps down having never driven a Delage before. Bourlier, meanwhile, had been duelling with Goux for the lead, until he too pitted – his legs badly burned. Sénéchal had soon pitted to rest after only a few laps, so took Bourlier's car out next. While the Delages were faster, the stops to relieve the drivers lost them that time. Meanwhile, the Bugattis kept running. Although Sénéchal was able to pass Costantini when the latter stopped to change tyres, he could not catch Goux, who took his second victory of the season. After the race the Delages were disqualified for using an unregistered driver, however this was overturned by the AIACR three months later as Ettore Bugatti had agreed to it during the race.

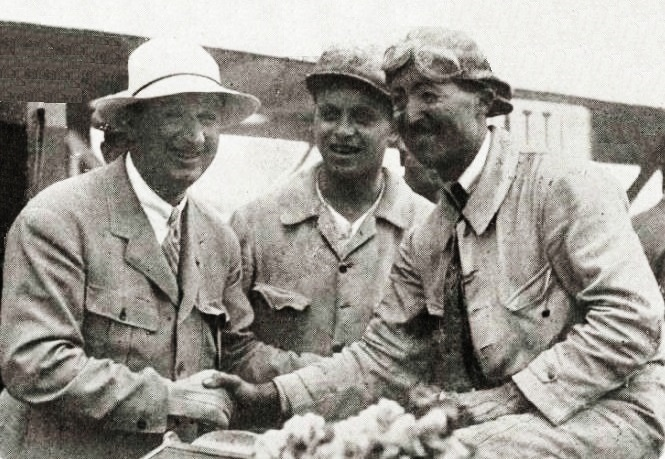
Ettore Bugatti with his winning driver, Jules Goux

By the time of the inaugural British Grand Prix a fortnight later, the Delages had been modified. Their drivers were Benoist, Wagner and Sénéchal. Bugatti did not send their works team, but local driver Malcolm Campbell had his entered. The Talbots were finally ready and driven by Henry Segrave, Jules Moriceau and joined by Albert Divo who had raced for Delage the previous year. The other entries were George Eyston for Aston Martin and aircraft designer Maj Frank Halford in his own Halford Special. To imitate a road course, sandbanks were added to the Brooklands oval to create artificial chicanes. With only nine starters, it was a bit strange to see the sight of the starting grid, with the first eight cars on the front row, and Sénéchal's Delage alone on the second row. From the start, the Talbots shot into the lead, led by Divo. But although fast, they were still unreliable, and Moriceau's front axle collapsed at the end of just the first lap. Those delicate axles and poor brakes meant they had to brake far earlier allowing Benoist to keep up. Divo, Segrave and Benoist were lapping the tail-enders on only the fifth lap although Divo was stopped soon after. Segrave lost a tyre on lap 15, putting Benoist in the lead. The Delages were improved, but the exhaust-pipes were still causing immense discomfort to the drivers. All their drivers were soaking their smouldering boots in buckets of water at each stop. Benoist continued to build his lead over Segrave and Sénéchal. Just at the halfway point Segrave pitted to fix an ongoing engine issues when the car caught fire forcing his retirement. Privateers Halford and Campbell kept circulating reliably six laps down, along with Divo trying to make up his lost time.

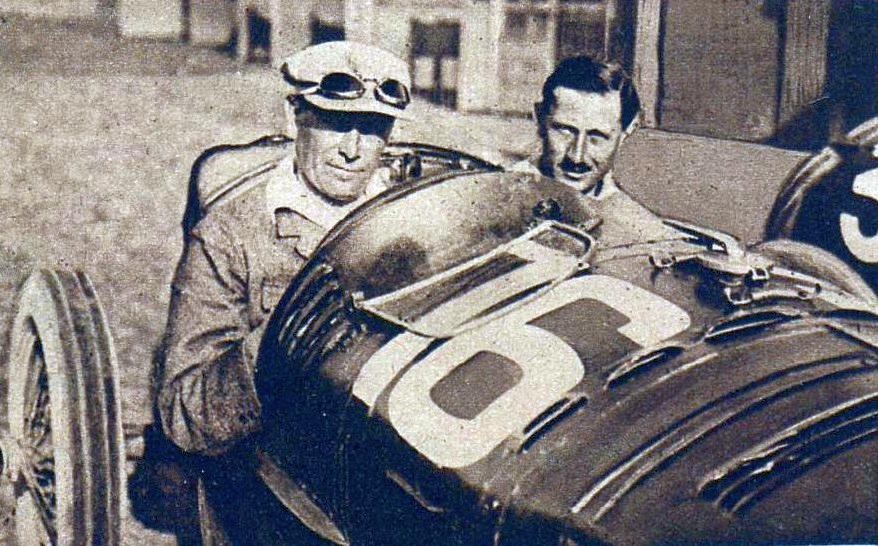
Louis Wagner, co-winner of the British Grand Prix

Benoist's smooth run ended on lap 63 when he pitted to change all four wheels. His overheated exhaust then stopped his engine restarting and he lost six laps, evaporating his lead. Once back in the race he started rebuilding his lead over Sénéchal, whose own exhaust broke. Wagner (already scalded from his own car that had retired early) relieved him. The heat finally overcame Benoist on lap 81. Once again, the car would not restart, and when Dubonnet took the car out as the relief-driver, he had lost the lead. Not expecting to drive, he raced in his suit without a helmet. About the same time, Halford parked his Special with a broken drive shaft. Divo had driven back to third when his supercharger packed up. This just left three cars running for the last dozen laps. Despite stopping every other lap to cool his feet, Wagner had enough of a lead to win. Campbell had overtaken Dubonnet near the end and bought his Bugatti in second ten minutes later. Segrave, in his Talbot, had put in the fastest lap on lap 2.

For the final race - the Italian Grand Prix - the only two manufacturers eligible for the title were Bugatti and Delage, as no others had competed in at least two of the earlier rounds. But with a 6-point difference, Delage could not win so chose not to attend, and neither did Talbot. Despite several days of practice, the OM team could not get any engine reliability and chose not to start. The three works Bugattis were driven by Costantini, Goux and Louis Charavel (who raced under the pseudonym “Sabipa”). Their competition then, were two cars from Maserati (driven by Ernesto Maserati and Emilio Materassi) and Roberto Serboli's Chiribiri. So, to avoid another farcical championship race, the officials opened the grid up to 1100cc voiturettes. This added a further seven cars (Amilcar, BNC and Marino but not Salmson. Costantini took the lead at the start, and while the Maseratis were initially competitive, both cars retired on only the fifth lap. Serboli's Chiribiri burst into flames when it pitted on the 24th lap, though the driver got out uninjured, and when Goux retired on lap 42, it left the two remaining Bugattis to cruise round for a simple 1–2 victory. Although Costantini had dominated the race, his engine started badly misfiring. Losing twelve minutes in the pits, allowed “Sabipa” to pass and eventually win by seven minutes (two laps). In the 400 km voiturette race, run simultaneously, the winner was André Morel in the works Amilcar (being only four laps behind the Bugattis at the time).

=== Formula Libre ===
Outside of the championship and its 1.5-litre restrictions, motor-racing was popular, attracting big crowds and large fields. The season had started in March in Italy with the first Circuito del Pozzo at Verona and the second Grand Prix of Rome. The field included a number of 2-litre cars raced in the championship from the year before. Emilio Materassi led initially in his Itala. Conte Brilli-Peri took over in his ex-works Alfa Romeo P2 and held the lead to the penultimate lap. But his three stops for fuel and tyres allowed Conte Aymo Maggi's Bugatti, which did not need to stop, to close the gap. Maggi caught up and passed him on the last lap to win by eight seconds.

The second Provence GP, at Miramas, was run across five heats to qualify for a final. Segrave won from his teammate Moriceau in their Talbot 700s, beating the Bugattis of William Grover-Williams and Louis Chiron. The second Marne GP was held on a new road course near Reims, a very fast triangular track of long straights joined by sharp hairpins. The Reims track would become a centre for French motor-racing over the next four decades. The Spanish Grand Prix, run a fortnight after the World Championship San Sebastián Grand Prix, instead run to Formula Libre regulations, allowed the teams to run their 1925 2-litre Grand Prix cars. The three regular Delage drivers had recovered from their earlier ordeal and faced the three unsupercharged Bugatti T35s of the works team, and two 2.3-litre Targa-spec privateers. Also starting was Henry Segrave in a 4.5-litre Sunbeam – the car that held the flying kilometre speed record. Once again, the King and Queen were in attendance, on a cooler day than the previous round. From the start, Segrave bolted into the lead, but when rain started on the 4th lap, his bigger car became more unwieldy and he soon retired with a broken front axle – an ailment apparently not exclusive to the smaller Talbot sister-cars. Morel took the lead briefly until he, and teammate Benoist, were both put out with spark-plug issues. At the halfway point, the rain had eased and Costantini had a 6-minute lead over Wagner's remaining Delage, with Goux, privateer “Williams” and Minoia a lap behind. Maintaining his fast pace, Costantini won with a 2-lap lead over Goux who finished second after Wagner, relieved by Benoist, had their issues. Minoia's Bugatti was the only other car to go the distance.

The Italian races were characterised by sizeable fields in 1100, 1500, 2-litre, and larger classes. The contrast between the poorly supported Italian Grand Prix and Milan Grand Prix, held just a week later also at Monza was stark, where the latter had 20 starters across the four classes. Bugatti and Maserati both arrived with two cars (for Costantini, Goux, Ernesto Maserati and Materassi respectively). Henry Segrave bought his 4.5-litre Sunbeam (now with a reinforced front axle) while Brilli-Peri raced Materassi's Itala Special. It was these cars that formed the leading pack at the start. Segrave's gearbox gave up after twelve laps, leaving Costantini and Goux leading by two laps. Despite a puncture for Goux, they held on for a dominant 1–2 victory.

Although now in the AIACR, the German Automobile Club had declared that they did not want their drivers competing. The German races were run with a combination of racing and sports cars, and hill-climbs carried an equal weighting in prestige. The circuits used (aside from AVUS) also reflected this with long, difficult tracks with many elevation changes. A German Grand Prix was officially held for the first time at AVUS in July. It was the first international race held in Germany since the war. A national race for sports-cars the previous year on the Kaiserpreis circuit in the Taunus mountains had been won by August Momberger in a supercharged NSU 1.3-litre. However, it is not recognised as the inaugural German Grand Prix. With no strong local Grand Prix cars, and hoping for a German victory, the organisers opened the event up to a mixture of sports, touring and grand prix cars. A big field of 38 cars, including sports and modified racing cars started this year's event. As well as works cars from OM, NSU, Brennabor and NAG, there were a raft of privateers and gentlemen-drivers, including Jean Chassagne and Hugo Urban-Emmerich running British Talbots. Favourites were the two factory-supported Mercedes cars of Adolf Rosenberger and a young, up-and-coming Rudolf Caracciola. They ran 1924 2-litre Grand Prix cars, modified to carry a second seat and unofficially assisted by Alfred Neubauer and his team.

Several weeks before the race, Kurt Neugebauer had almost had a major accident when his NAG got into a slide at 150k/h on a wet AVUS track. During practice, Luigi Platé's Chiribiri collided with Wilhelm Heine's NAG and crashed, killing Platé's mechanic and severely injuring both drivers. On race day, an immense ground of 230000 people arrived. In a staggered start, with the bigger cars flagged off first, Caracciola stalled his car and lost a minute. At the end of the first lap, Rosenberger was leading on elapsed time. Ferdinando Minoia, in the OM, put in the fastest lap of the race on lap two to get up to second, but soon had engine trouble and had to pit. Then after four laps it began to rain, making the track slippery and treacherous. It negated the power of the bigger cars, allowing the smaller Talbots to stay close. Rosenberger led from Urban-Emmerich and Chassagne. Caracciola pitted, losing seven minutes to change spark plugs. Then at the end of the 6th lap Rosenberger crashed coming out of the North Curve, overcome by leaking fuel fumes. Skidding on the slippery track at over 150kph the car piled into the scoreboard and timekeepers' hut, killing two of the officials and seriously injuring the other while Rosenberger and his mechanic were slightly injured. Three laps later, Urban-Emmerich also crashed at the North Curve. He went wide, breaking through the border fence and injuring several spectators, though the driver got the car back to the pits. Then just half a lap later, Chassagne crashed and rolled the other Talbot at the South Curve. Through all this mayhem, Caracciola raced on in fifth, five minutes behind the leader, lapping the fastest in the field. The rain stopped by the 13th lap. A lap later, the Mercedes was in the lead and pulling away. After the 20 laps Caracciola won by over three minutes from the 2.6-litre NAG of Christian Riecken (who was also the technical director of that company). Caracciola's skill in the difficult conditions earned him the nickname Regenmeister (“rain-master”).

Mercedes arrived as a works team at Solitude in September, running their 2-litre 1924 cars again, this time for Otto Merz and Christian Werner. It was the first race for Alfred Neubauer as the team manager, a role he would fill for another thirty years. A small field also included the NSU works team with their supercharged 1.5-litre cars. Merz won comfortably in a race that ended in heavy rain.

In Britain, racing at Brooklands still was immensely popular. Outside the Grand Prix the premier event was the Junior Car Club 200. A huge field of 38 cars took the start, all labelled as “Specials” by the organisers so that the public would not be confused between the cars racing on the track and those on public sale. Although no works teams were officially entered, there were team-entries running the latest Talbot, Alvis, Aston Martin, Salmson and Amilcar models, along with the previously seen Halford and Eldridge specials. On a sunny but cold day, Henry Segrave and Albert Divo finally got the reliability to get a 1–2 victory.

Jules Goux, now 42, retired at the end of the season. A veteran who had been racing since 1906 with teams including Peugeot and Ballot, he had victories in the Targa Florio (1908), Indianapolis 500 (1913) and the first Italian GP (1921) as well as this year's victories. Meo Costantini also retired at the end of the season but would stay with Bugatti as their team manager. During the year, Bugatti put out a brochure advertising that its cars had won 503 victories from January to September – almost two a day somehow, which must have included many class victories as well as outright ones. Despite the advances in engine power and technology, it was clear that the new regulations were not inspiring manufacturer support, and therefore not exciting the populace.

== Championship final standings ==
Table lists the highest race position for each manufacturer.
Note: To be eligible for the championship, manufacturers had to take part in three of the Grands Prix including the Italian GP. * non-participation disqualified the manufacturer from the championship

Pos	Manufacturer	500 (United States)	FRA (France)	SSN (Spain)	GBR (United Kingdom)	ITA (Italy)	Pts
1	(France) Bugatti		1	1	2	1	11
—	(France) Delage			2	1	*	[21]
—	(United States) Miller	1			*	*	[25]
—	(United States) Duesenberg	5			*	*	[28]
—	(United Kingdom) Eldridge Special	Ret			*	*	[29]
—	(United States) Fengler-Locomobile	Ret			*	*	[29]
—	(United States) Guyot-Schmidt	Ret			*	*	[29]
—	(United States) Frontenac-Ford	Ret			*	*	[29]
—	(United Kingdom) Aston Martin			*	Ret	*	[29]
—	(United Kingdom) Halford Special			*	Ret	*	[29]
—	(United Kingdom) Talbot			*	Ret	*	[29]
—	(Italy) Chiribiri			*	*	Ret	[29]
—	(Italy) Maserati			*	*	Ret	[29]
Pos	Manufacturer	500 (United States)	FRA (France)	SSN (Spain)	GBR (United Kingdom)	ITA (Italy)	Pts

Colour	Result	Points
Gold	Winner	1
Silver	2nd place	2
Bronze	3rd place	3
Green	Other finishers	4
Red	Non-finishers	5
Blank	Did not participate	6

== Results of the season's major races ==
Pos	Driver	Team	ROM (Italy)	TGF (Italy)	IND (United States)	FRA (France)	SEB (Spain)	ESP (Spain)	GBR (United Kingdom)	MNT (Italy)	BOU (France)	ITA (Italy)	MIL (Italy)
	(Italy) Bartolomeo Costantini	Usines Bugatti		1		Ret	3	1				2	1
	(France) Jules Goux	Usines Bugatti		3		1	1	2				Ret	2
	(Italy) Emilio Materassi	Private Entry; Officine Alfieri Maserati	Ret	4						1		Ret	Ret
	(Italy) Aymo Maggi	Officine Alfieri Maserati; Private Entry	1							Ret			
	(United States) Frank Lockhart	Private Entry			1								
	(France) Robert Sénéchal	Automobiles Delage					[2]		1				
	(United Kingdom) George Eyston	Bamford & Martin Ltd; Private Entry							Ret		1		
	(France) "Sabipa" (Louis Charavel)	Usines Bugatti										1	
	(Italy) Ferdinando Minoia	Usines Bugatti		2			5	4					
	(Italy) Gastone Brilli-Peri	Alfa Corse	2										5
	(United States) Harry Hartz	Harry Hartz			2								
	(France) Edmond Bourlier	Automobiles Delage					2						
	(United Kingdom) Malcolm Campbell	Private Entry							2		DNS		
	(Italy) Bruno Presenti	Private Entry								2			
	(France) ? . Bourdan	Soc. des Moteurs Salmson									2		
	(France) Louis Wagner	SA des Autos et Cycles Peugeot; Automobiles Delage		6			[4]	3	Ret [1]				
	(Italy) Giovanni Bonmartini	Alfa Corse	3										
	(United States) Cliff Woodbury	Private Entry			3								
	(France) Robert Benoist	Automobiles Delage		WD			Ret	Ret [3]	3				
	(Italy) Baconin Borzacchini	Private Entry		?						3			
	(France) Marcel Violet	Ste Industrielle de Materiel Automobile									3		
	(Italy) ? Arturo Farinotti	Private Entry											3
	(Italy) Franco Mazzotti	Private Entry	4							4			
	(United States) Fred Comer	Harry Hartz			4								
	(France) André Morel	Automobiles Delage					4	Ret					
	(United Kingdom) George Newman	Société des Moteurs Salmson									4		
	(Monaco) Louis Chiron	Private Entry											4
	(Switzerland) Mario Lepori	Private Entry	5	Ret									
	(France) André Dubonnet	Private Entry; Automobiles Delage		5					[3]				
	(United States) Pete DePaolo	Duesenberg Brothers			5								
	(Spain) ? Jules Ferry	Private Entry						5					
	(Italy) Franco Cortese	Private Entry								5			
	(Russia) / (France) Boris Ivanowski	Private Entry						[5]			5		
	(Italy) Ugo Stefanelli	Private Entry								8			6
	(Italy) Pasquale Croce	Private Entry	6	9									
	(United States) Frank Elliott	Private Entry			6								
	(Italy) Federico Valpreda	Private Entry								6			
	(United Kingdom) Francis Samuelson	Private Entry									6		
Pos	Driver	Team	ROM (Italy)	TGF (Italy)	IND (United States)	FRA (France)	SEB (Spain)	ESP (Spain)	GBR (United Kingdom)	MNT (Italy)	BOU (France)	ITA (Italy)	MIL (Italy)

italics show the driver of the race's fastest lap.
Only those drivers with a best finish of 6th or better are shown. Sources:

Citations
