= 1926 Milan Grand Prix =

Race details
- Date: 12 September 1926
- Official name: Gran Premio Milano
- Location: Monza, Italy
- Course: Autodromo Nazionale Monza
- Course length: 10.00 km (6.21 miles)
- Distance: 40 laps, 400 km (248.5 miles)

Pole position
| Driver | (United Kingdom) Henry Segrave | Sunbeam |
- Grid positions set by car number

Fastest lap
| Driver | (Italy) Meo Costantini | Bugatti |
- Time: 3:42.2

Podium
| First | (Italy) Meo Costantini | Bugatti |
| Second | (France) Jules Goux | Bugatti |
| Third | (Italy) Arturo Farinotti | Bugatti |

The 1926 Milan Grand Prix was a Grand Prix motor race held at Monza on 12 September 1926. The race was held over 40 laps of the 10 km circuit, for a total race distance of 400 km. The race was won by Bartolomeo Costantini driving a Bugatti Type 35C.

As the race was held just one week after the 1926 Italian Grand Prix, also held at Monza, many of the entrants were the same. However, as this race was held to Formula Libre regulations, a much larger entry was attracted. The Bugatti team chose to use their 2-litre 1925 cars as they had at the Spanish Grand Prix earlier in the year.

Prizes were awarded for outright position, as well as three classes based on engine capacity:

- Class E for cars up to 2 litres;
- Class F for cars up to 1.5 litres;
- Class G for cyclecars up to 1.1 litres.

A special category was also used for cars over 2 litres.

== Classification ==
| Pos | No | Class | Driver | Car | Laps | Time/Retired |
|---|---|---|---|---|---|---|
| 1 | 19 | E | (Italy) Meo Costantini | Bugatti | 40 | 2h36m18.4 |
| 2 | 18 | E | (France) Jules Goux | Bugatti | 40 | 2h47m19.0 |
| 3 | 14 | E | (Italy) Arturo Farinotti | Bugatti | 40 | 2h56m51.0 |
| 4 | 15 | E | (Monaco) Louis Chiron | Bugatti | 40 | 2h58m39.0 |
| 5 | 3 | | (Italy) Gastone Brilli-Peri | Itala Special | 40 | 2h59m17.0 |
| 6 | 29 | F | (Italy) Ugo Sisto Stefanelli | Bugatti | 40 | 3h0757.4 |
| 7 | 28 | F | (Italy) Roberto Serboli | Chiribiri | 40 | 3h11m45.6 |
| 8 | 36 | G | (France) Henny de Joncy | BNC | 40 | 3h16m31.6 |
| 9 | 32 | G | (Italy) Abele Clerici | Salmson | 40 | 3h21m26.6 |
| DNF | 27 | F | (Italy) Ernesto Maserati | Maserati | 31 | Fuel Tank |
| DNF | 25 | F | H. Jenter | Chiribiri | 29 | Crash |
| DNF | 22 | E | (Italy) Supremo Montanari | Bugatti | 28 | Engine |
| DNF | 31 | G | Gubernatis | BNC | 17 | |
| DNF | 12 | E | Pierre Clause | Bignan | 13 | |
| DNF | 1 | | (United Kingdom) Henry Segrave | Sunbeam | 12 | Gearbox |
| DNF | 23 | F | (Italy) Emilio Materassi | Maserati | 11 | Fuel Tank |
| DNF | 11 | E | (France) François Eysermann | Bugatti | 10 | Oil Sump, Bearings |
| DNF | 24 | F | Maleterre | Jean Graf | 10 | |
| DNF | 30 | F | (Italy) Achille Varzi | Bugatti | 9 | Engine Bearing |
| DNF | 33 | G | Jean Graf | Jean Graf | 6 | |
| DNS | 26 | F | Guido Ciriaci | Fiat | | Too slow |
| DNS | 35 | G | Gina Colli | Amilcar | | Too slow |
| DNS | 38 | G | Pina Conti | Amilcar | | Too slow |
