= 1926 French Grand Prix =

- Race 2 of 5 in the 1926 World Manufacturers' Championship
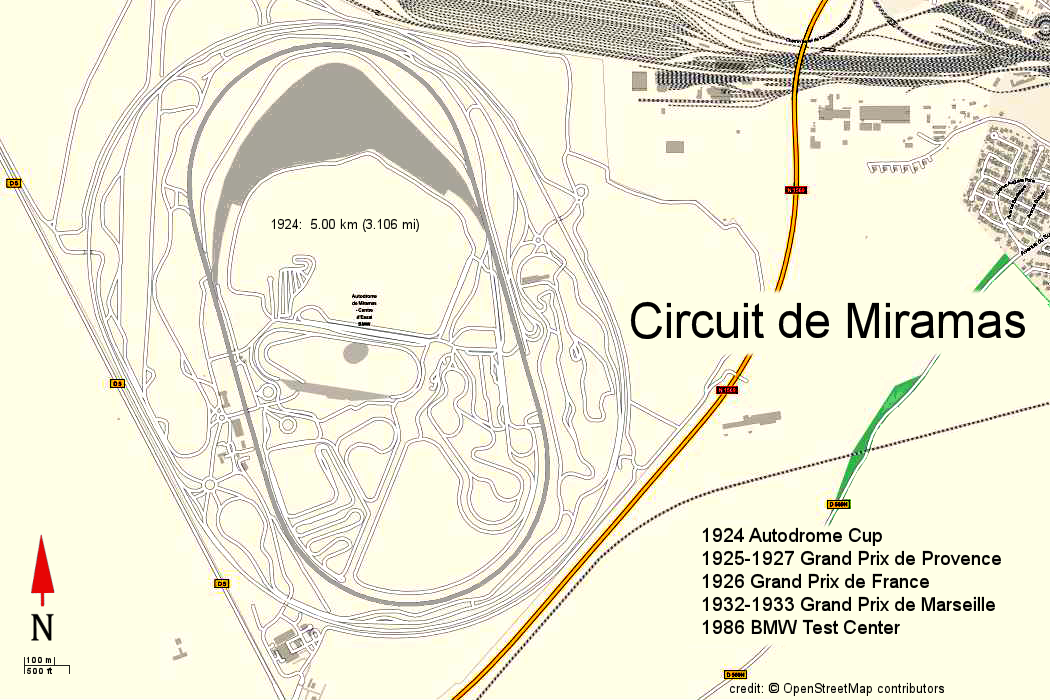

Race details
- Date: 27 June 1926
- Official name: XX Grand Prix de l'Automobile Club de France
- Location: Miramas, France
- Course: Circuit of Miramas
- Course length: 5.10 km (3.17 miles)
- Distance: 100 laps, 509.6 km (316.6 miles)

Pole position
| Driver | (Italy) Meo Costantini | Bugatti |
- Grid positions set by car number

Fastest lap
| Driver | (France) Jules Goux | Bugatti |
- Time: 2:24

Podium
| First | (France) Jules Goux | Bugatti |
| Second | No other finishers | |

The 1926 French Grand Prix was a Grand Prix motor race held at the Circuit of Miramas on 27 June 1926 with only three competitors qualifying.

It was the second race of the 1926 AIACR World Manufacturers' Championship season. Unfortunately for the spectators, of all the cars that were announced to participate in the race, only three Bugattis started. In the end there was just one car that managed to complete the full race distance; the Bugatti of Jules Goux.

== Classification ==
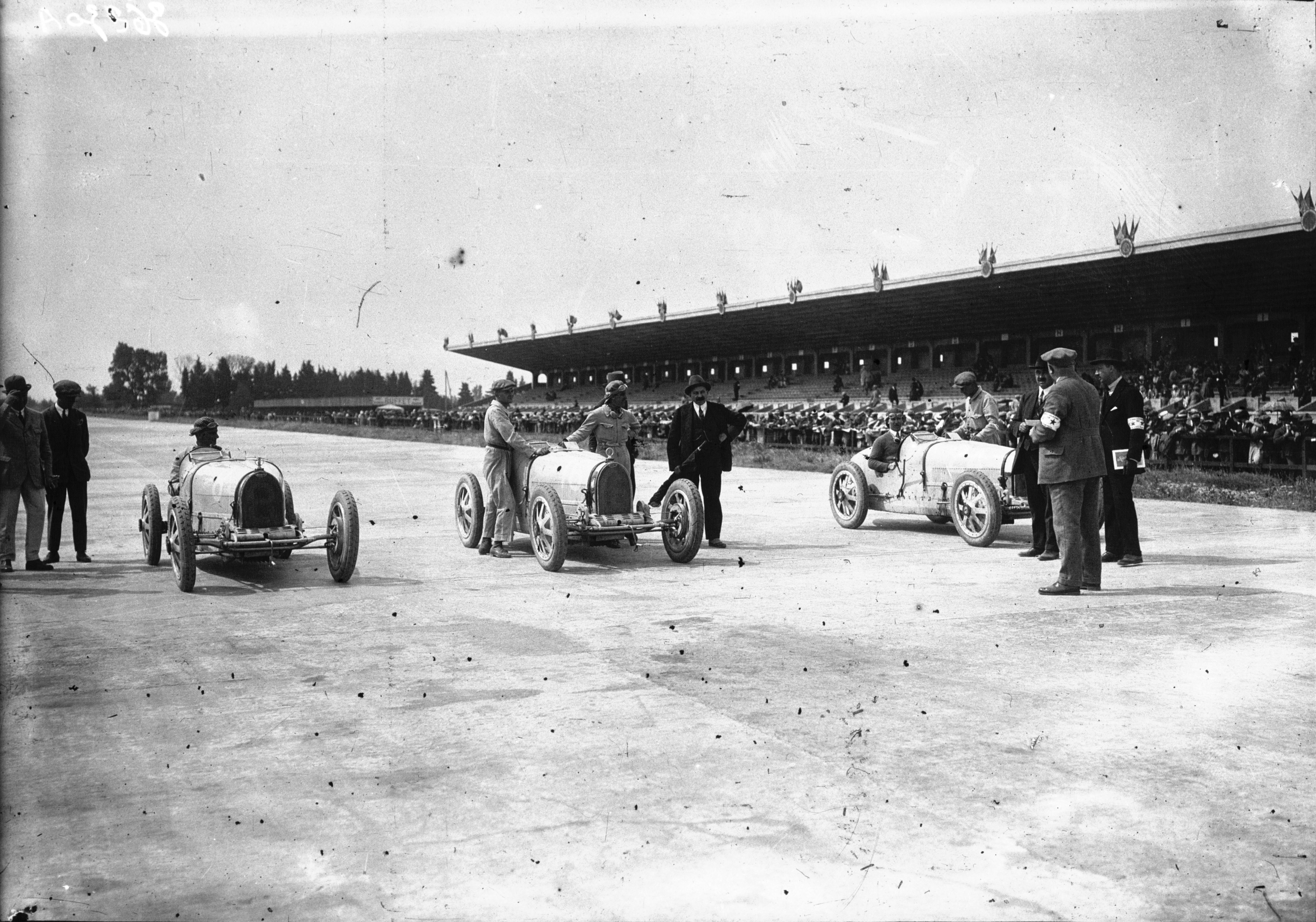
Starting grid

| Pos | No | Driver | Car | Laps | Time/Retired |
|---|---|---|---|---|---|
| 1 | 24 | (France) Jules Goux | Bugatti 39A | 100 | 4h38m43.8 |
| NC | 8 | (Italy) Meo Costantini | Bugatti 39A | 85 | 4h43m13.0 |
| DNF | 16 | (Spain) Pierre de Vizcaya | Bugatti 39A | 45 | Engine |
| DNA | 2 | (United Kingdom) Henry Segrave | Talbot 700 | | Car not ready |
| DNA | 4 | (France) Marcel Violet | SIMA-Violet | | Car not ready |
| DNA | 6 | (France) Robert Benoist | Delage 15S8 | | Car not ready |
| DNA | 10 | (France) Albert Divo | Talbot 700 | | Car not ready |
| DNA | 12 | ? | SIMA-Violet | | Car not ready |
| DNA | 14 | (France) Edmond Bourlier | Delage 15S8 | | Car not ready |
| DNA | 18 | (France) Jules Moriceau | Talbot 700 | | Car not ready |
| DNA | 20 | ? | SIMA-Violet | | Car not ready |
| DNA | 22 | ? | Delage 15S8 | | Car not ready |

Grand Prix Race
| Previous race: 1926 Indianapolis 500 | 1926 Grand Prix season Grandes Épreuves | Next race: 1926 San Sebastián Grand Prix |
| Previous race: 1925 French Grand Prix | French Grand Prix | Next race: 1927 French Grand Prix |
