= 1926 Spanish Grand Prix =

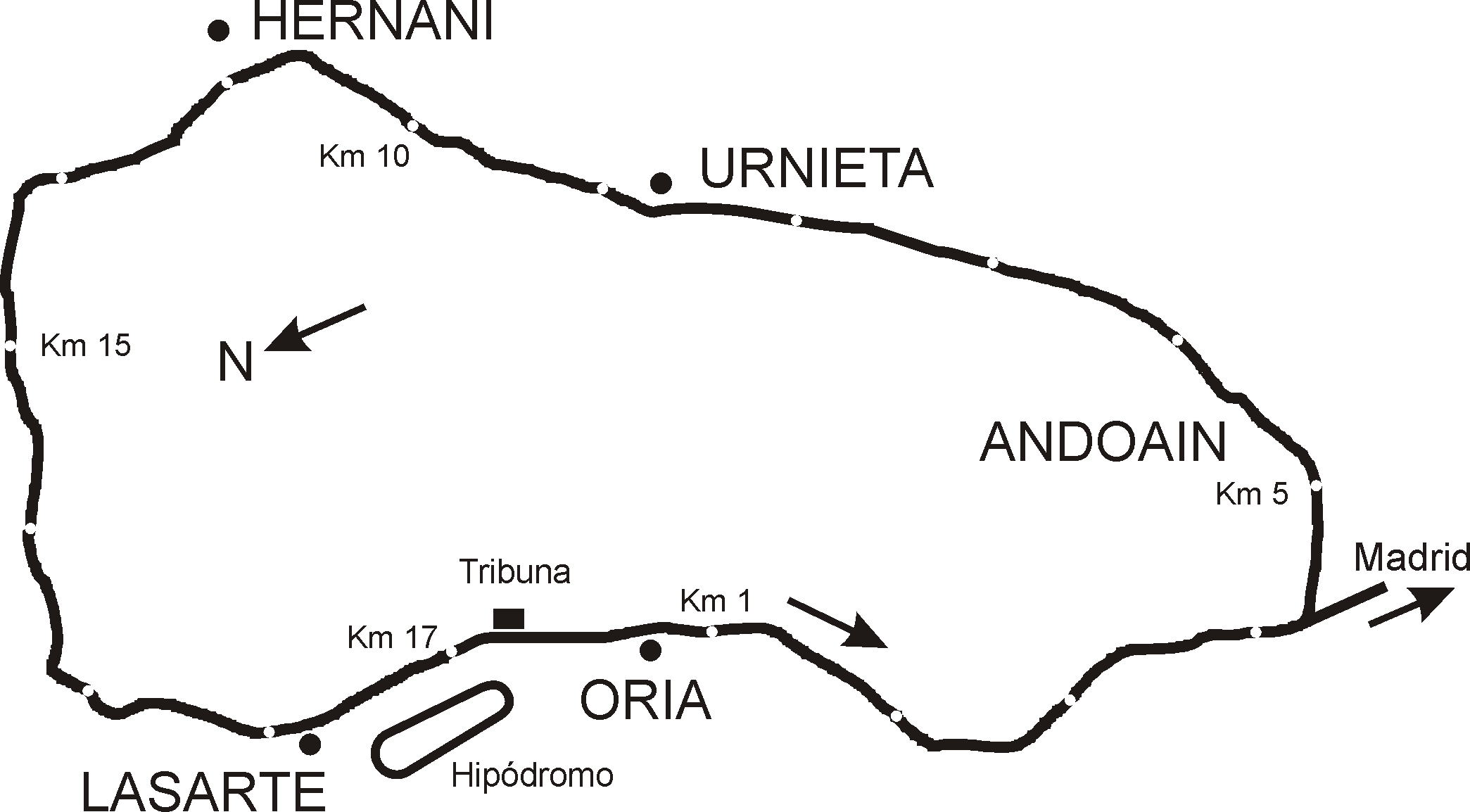

Race details
- Date: 25 July 1926
- Official name: II Gran Premio de España
- Location: San Sebastián, Spain
- Course: Circuito Lasarte
- Course length: 17.32 km (11.76 miles)
- Distance: 40 laps, 692.6 km (430.4 miles)

Pole position
Driver	(United Kingdom) Henry Segrave	Sunbeam
- Grid positions set by car number

Fastest lap
Driver	(Italy) Bartolomeo Costantini	Bugatti
- Time: 7:41.6

Podium
First	(Italy) Bartolomeo Costantini	Bugatti
Second	(France) Jules Goux	Bugatti
Third	(France) Louis Wagner; (France) Robert Benoist	Delage

The 1926 Spanish Grand Prix (formally the II Gran Premio de España) was a Grand Prix motor race held at Circuito Lasarte on 25 July 1926. The race was held over 40 laps of a 17.315 km circuit, for a total race distance of 692.6 km. The race was won by Bartolomeo Costantini driving a Bugatti.

The race was held just one week after the 1926 European Grand Prix held on the same circuit. The European Grand Prix was a round of the 1926 AIACR World Championship, so was held to the 1.5 litre formula. The Spanish Grand Prix was held to Formula Libre, and so the Bugatti and Delage factory entries ran their 1925 2-litre cars.

== Classification ==
Pos	No	Driver	Car	Laps	Time/Retired
1	5	(Italy) Bartolomeo Costantini	Bugatti	40	5h35m47
2	15	(France) Jules Goux	Bugatti	40	5h52m15
3	24	(France) Louis Wagner (France) Robert Benoist	Delage	40	5h56m57
4	23	(Italy) Ferdinando Minoia	Bugatti	40	5h57m26
NC	30	(France) Jules Ferry (France) Boris Ivanowski	Bugatti	33	6h03m32
DNF	28	(United Kingdom) "Williams"	Bugatti	29	Valves
DNF	16	(France) André Morel	Delage	6	Valves
DNF	3	(United Kingdom) Henry Segrave	Sunbeam	5	Front Axle
DNF	6	(France) Robert Benoist	Delage	4	Valves, Ignition
DNF	29	(Belgium) René de Buck	Bugatti	2	Steering

== Sources ==
Grand Prix Race
1926 Grand Prix season
Previous race: 1923 Spanish Grand Prix	Spanish Grand Prix	Next race: 1927 Spanish Grand Prix
