= 1926 Italian Grand Prix =

- Race 5 of 5 in the 1926 World Manufacturers' Championship

Race details
- Date: 5 September 1926
- Official name: VI Gran Premio d'Italia
- Location: Monza, Italy
- Course: Autodromo Nazionale di Monza
- Course length: 10.00 km (6.21 miles)
- Distance: 60 laps, 600 km (372.6 miles)

Pole position
| Driver | (Italy) Emilio Materassi | Maserati |
- Grid positions set by car number

Fastest lap
| Driver | (Italy) Meo Costantini | Bugatti |
- Time: 3:47.0

Podium
| First | (France) Louis Charavel | Bugatti |
| Second | (Italy) Meo Costantini | Bugatti |
| Third | No other finishers | |

The 1926 Italian Grand Prix was a Grand Prix motor race held at Monza on 5 September 1926.

The cars were divided into two classes, which raced simultaneously but over a different distance. The longer race, which was also the final race of the 1926 AIACR World Manufacturers' Championship season, was contested by 1.5-litre Grand Prix cars over 60 laps, while the shorter race was for up to 1.1 litre cyclecars, and held over 40 laps. Like the other races in the 1926 season, the Italian Grand Prix was quite dull, with just two cars running after the cyclecars had finished their race.

== Report ==
Costantini's Bugatti took the lead early, with the other two Bugattis battling with the two Maseratis over the first two laps, the gap between second and fifth place just 5 seconds after the first lap, with the Chiribiri of Serboli down the field with the 1100cc cars. After just four laps, Maserati retired with engine failure, followed one lap later by team-mate Materassi, also with engine failure, leaving just the three Bugattis and the lone struggling Chiribiri in the 1500cc class.

The Chiribiri of Serboli eventually retired after 27 laps in a spectacular fire in the otherwise dull race. Goux and Sabipa swapped positions a few times mostly due to pitstops, but Goux ultimately retired after 36 laps. Once the cyclecars had finished their 40 laps, the two remaining Bugattis continued uneventfully until nearly the end of the race. However, on his 58th lap, Costantini, who had totally dominated the race, experienced engine trouble, but was able to crawl around to the pits. Although he lost the lead to Sabipa, he was able to finish the race on just three (of eight) cylinders.

== Classification ==
=== 1.1 Litre Cyclecar Results ===
| Pos | No | Driver | Car | Laps | Time/Retired |
|---|---|---|---|---|---|
| 1 | 23 | (France) André Morel | Amilcar | 40 | 3h00m32.4 |
| 2 | 28 | (France) Arthur Duray | Amilcar | 40 | 3h09m16.4 |
| 3 | 27 | (France) Henny De Joncy | BNC | 40 | 3h16m05.4 |
| DNF | 24 | Augusto Trevisani | Marino | 10 | Engine |
| DNF | 21 | Alberto Marino | Marino | 6 | Engine |
| DNF | 26 | Charles Martin | Amilcar | 3 | Supercharger |
| DNF | 22 | Gubernatis | BNC | 1 | |

=== 1.5 Litre Grand Prix Results ===
| Pos | No | Driver | Car | Laps | Time/Retired |
|---|---|---|---|---|---|
| 1 | 16 | (France) "Sabipa" (Louis Charavel) | Bugatti 39A | 60 | 4h20m29 |
| 2 | 12 | (Italy) Meo Costantini | Bugatti 39A | 60 | 4h27m01 |
| Ret | 7 | (France) Jules Goux | Bugatti 39A | 36 | Oil pressure |
| Ret | 4 | (Italy) Roberto Serboli | Chiribiri 12/16 | 27 | Fire |
| Ret | 9 | (Italy) Ernesto Maserati | Maserati 26 (8C-1500) | 5 | Engine |
| Ret | 3 | (Italy) Emilio Materassi | Maserati 26 (8C-1500) | 4 | Engine |
| DNS | 5 | (Italy) Ferdinando Minoia | OM 8C | | Withdrawn |
| DNS | 10 | (Italy) Giuseppe Morandi | OM 8C | | Withdrawn |

Grand Prix Race
| Previous race: 1926 British Grand Prix | 1926 Grand Prix season Grandes Épreuves | Next race: 1927 Indianapolis 500 |
| Previous race: 1925 Italian Grand Prix | Italian Grand Prix | Next race: 1927 Italian Grand Prix |
