= 1926 British Grand Prix =

- Race 4 of 5 in the 1926 World Manufacturers' Championship
- Brooklands circuit layout

Race details
- Date: 7 August 1926
- Official name: Grand Prix of the Royal Automobile Club
- Location: Surrey, England
- Course: Brooklands
- Course length: 4.21 km (2.61 miles)
- Distance: 110 laps, 463.10 km (287.76 miles)

Fastest lap
Driver	(United Kingdom) Henry Segrave	Talbot
- Time: 1:49.5

Podium
First	(France) Robert Sénéchal; (France) Louis Wagner	Delage
Second	(United Kingdom) Malcolm Campbell	Bugatti
Third	(France) Robert Benoist; (France) André Dubonnet	Delage

The first Grand Prix of the Royal Automobile Club, commonly referred to as the 1926 British Grand Prix was a Grand Prix motor race held at the Brooklands circuit on 7 August 1926.

It was the fourth race of the 1926 AIACR World Manufacturers' Championship season, and the first-ever British Grand Prix.

== Circuit ==
The full 4.427 km (2.751 mi) banked Outer Circuit was not used for the Grand Prix. Instead cars continued straight on at The Fork and drove up the Finishing Straight (rather than bearing right to take the full length of the Members' Banking), on which two sandbank chicanes were constructed, one at either end of the straight, before rejoining the Outer Circuit, having cut out entirely the section passing behind the Members' Hill. Between the chicanes and just before the finishing line the cars were funnelled through the right-hand span of the footbridge which had been built for the occasion across the straight and which had two supports resting on the track itself.

This arrangement gave a circuit length of around 4.21 km, so – together with the fact that the race started at the top of the Finishing Straight, meaning that the first lap was not the full 4.21 km and included only one of the two chicanes – the 110 lap race was 462 km, less than the 600 km minimum mandated by the regulations of the 1926 World Manufacturers' Championship, but nonetheless the race still counted.

== Report ==
The race attracted one of the better entries of the 1926 season, with thirteen cars listed in the official programme – albeit that two of these were the privately owned Talbot and Bugatti cars entered by Malcolm Campbell for himself to drive, the popular British privateer opting for the Bugatti the day before the race. With the works Bugatti team not entering the race, firm favourites to win were the Delages of Robert Benoist, Louis Wagner and Robert Sénéchal. The three new French built Talbots were painted green in order to promote the British arm of S.T.D Motors, but braking issues put them at a disadvantage. Finally there were the modified Aston Martin of George Eyston, Frank Halford's Halford Special (itself based on an Aston Martin chassis), two Thomas "Flat Iron" Specials (an unsupercharged version for J. G. Parry-Thomas and a supercharged model for Clive Gallop) and a front-wheel drive Alvis for Maurice Harvey. Mechanical problems led to both Thomas Specials and the Alvis being withdrawn, meaning that nine cars lined up for the start.

At the start, Albert Divo took an immediate lead, followed initially by Campbell and Eyston, while the Delages of Sénéchal and Wagner made very slow starts. By the end of the banking coming onto the Finishing Straight, the other two Talbots had taken second and third place, making it a Talbot 1–2–3, Divo–Jules Moriceau–Henry Segrave. This was short lived, however, as when Moriceau braked for the first sandbank, his front wheels wobbled wildly causing the front axle to collapse, putting him out of the race. By the end of the first lap, Benoist had moved up to third place.

Over the next five laps, Divo and Segrave tried to pull away from Benoist, and although much faster under acceleration they were unable to do so due to the Talbot's inferior braking. Meanwhile Sénéchal had started moving up the field, making up for his poor start, but his team-mate Wagner had made several pitstops due to a misfiring engine, eventually retiring after 6 laps. After 7 laps, Divo's engine too started misfiring, forcing him to pit, dropping him to last place. By lap 10 Sénéchal had moved up to third place, behind Segrave and Benoist, while Halford had overtaken Campbell for fourth place.

On lap 15, Segrave stopped to change a damaged tire, dropping him to third, while Divo was trying to make up ground, having overtaken Eyston's slow Aston Martin for sixth place. Benoist was now two laps ahead of everyone, and his lead increased every lap. On lap 35, Benoist stopped to change his rear tires, but did not lose the lead to Segrave who had overtaken Sénéchal. Meanwhile Divo made another long pitstop, dropping him back to last place, and well out of contention.

Both engine and brake problems then followed for Segrave, making several pitstops to investigate the issues, dropping him right back, and eventually retiring after 62 laps. Eyston suffered a similar fate, retiring with a blown gasket. Segrave's trouble promoted Halford up into third place, but not for long as Campbell was quickly gaining on him. A pitstop for Sénéchal only served to increase Benoist's now huge lead of several laps. Halford made a slow stop, dropping him behind Campbell until he too made a pitstop. However Halford was to lose third place again, passed by the charging Divo.

Benoist too made a pitstop, and had some trouble restarting his engine, causing his lead to reduce considerably, but was able to restart still with more than a lap in hand over Sénéchal. The high temperatures were causing the drivers problems, especially the Delages and the remaining Talbot of Divo. Benoist stopped on his 81st lap with his exhaust glowing white hot, wrapping some asbestos sheeting around it to stop it from burning through the car. An issue with Sénéchal's exhaust made the problem even worse, forcing him to stop on lap 83 and hand over to Wagner. Halford also had trouble on his 83rd lap, retiring with a broken prop shaft, pushing the car all the way back to the pits.

Wagner was now in a lot of pain, forcing him to stop frequently to dip his feet in water due to the intense heat, causing his lead to dwindle. After a valiant fight, Divo too needed to stop frequently, but his car then refused to restart, forcing him to retire after 87 laps. This left just three cars for the final 15 laps. Benoist handed his car over to Dubonnet (who had not driven a lap of the circuit before and was wearing an ordinary blue lounge suit), who was being chased now by Campbell's Bugatti. Both drivers were still trying to catch Wagner, who was stopping frequently to bathe his feet, but this was not the case, with Wagner eventually winning with over four laps lead. Dubonnet struggled with flames coming from his engine, and having to learn the circuit as he drove, allowing Campbell to close the gap, and on lap 102 overtake him for second place, which he held to the end.

== Classification ==
Pos	No	Driver	Car	Laps	Time/Retired
1	14	(France) Robert Sénéchal (France) Louis Wagner	Delage 15 S 8	110	4h00m56.6
2	7	(United Kingdom) Malcolm Campbell	Bugatti 39A	110	4h10m44.2
3	2	(France) Robert Benoist (France) André Dubonnet	Delage 15 S 8	110	4h13m08.4 4h18m08
Ret	1	(France) Albert Divo	Talbot GPLB	87	Supercharger
Ret	5	(United Kingdom) Frank Halford	Halford Special	82	Prop shaft joint
Ret	9	(United Kingdom) Henry Segrave	Talbot GPLB	62	Supercharger
Ret	3	(United Kingdom) George Eyston	Aston Martin GP	44	Gasket
Ret	10	(France) Louis Wagner	Delage 15 S 8	6	Engine misfire
Ret	6	(France) Jules Moriceau	Talbot GPLB	0	Front axle
DNS	4	(United Kingdom) Clive Gallop	Thomas Special	n/a	
DNS	8	(United Kingdom) Maurice Harvey	Alvis GP	n/a	
DNS	11	(United Kingdom) Malcolm Campbell	Talbot	n/a	
DNS	12	(United Kingdom) J G Parry-Thomas	Thomas Special	n/a	

Grand Prix Race
Previous race: 1926 San Sebastián Grand Prix	1926 Grand Prix season Grandes Épreuves	Next race: 1926 Italian Grand Prix
Previous race: None	British Grand Prix	Next race: 1927 British Grand Prix
