= World Manufacturers' Championship =

Motorsport event (1925–1930)

The World Manufacturers' Championship, also known as Automobile World Championship, was a competition organised by the AIACR between 1925 and 1930. It was the first World Championship in a motorsport.

== Scoring system ==
Unlike the modern Formula One points system, the championship awarded fewer points for higher finishes; the champion would be the manufacturer which ended the season on the lowest points score. A manufacturer would only score points from its highest-placed car. The points distribution is as follows.

Position	Points
1st	1
2nd	2
3rd	3
All other finishers	4
All non-finishers	5
Not starting	6

For the 1925 season, in order to be eligible for the championship, manufacturers had to compete in the Italian Grand Prix and the Grand Prix of their country of origin. One score was also dropped. For 1926 and 1927, no scores were dropped and eligibility was gained by competing in at least two Grands Prix in addition to the mandatory Italian Grand Prix. For 1928 a seven-races schedule was planned with mandatory participation at three rounds. However, only two races were effectively held according to the AIACR regulations, so the title wasn't awarded. A similar situation happened in 1929 and 1930 seasons since only one race was held to the AIACR regulations.

For 1931 the AIACR sanctioned the European Drivers' Championship replacing the failed World Championship.

== Results ==
Season	Champion	Wins	Points	Margin (pnts)	Grands Prix				
1925	(Italy) Alfa Romeo	2	7	4	(United States); 500	(Belgium); BEL	(France); FRA	(Italy); ITA	
1926	(France) Bugatti	3	11	10	(United States); 500	(France); FRA	(Spain); SAN	(United Kingdom); GBR	(Italy); ITA
1927	(France) Delage	4	10	13	(United States); 500	(France); FRA	(Spain); ESP	(Italy); ITA	(United Kingdom); GBR
1928	not awarded				(United States); 500	(Italy); ITA			
1929	not awarded				(France); FRA				
1930	not awarded				(Belgium); BEL				

== See also ==
- European Championship (auto racing)
- Formula One
