= 1926 San Sebastián Grand Prix =

- Race 3 of 5 in the 1926 World Manufacturers' Championship
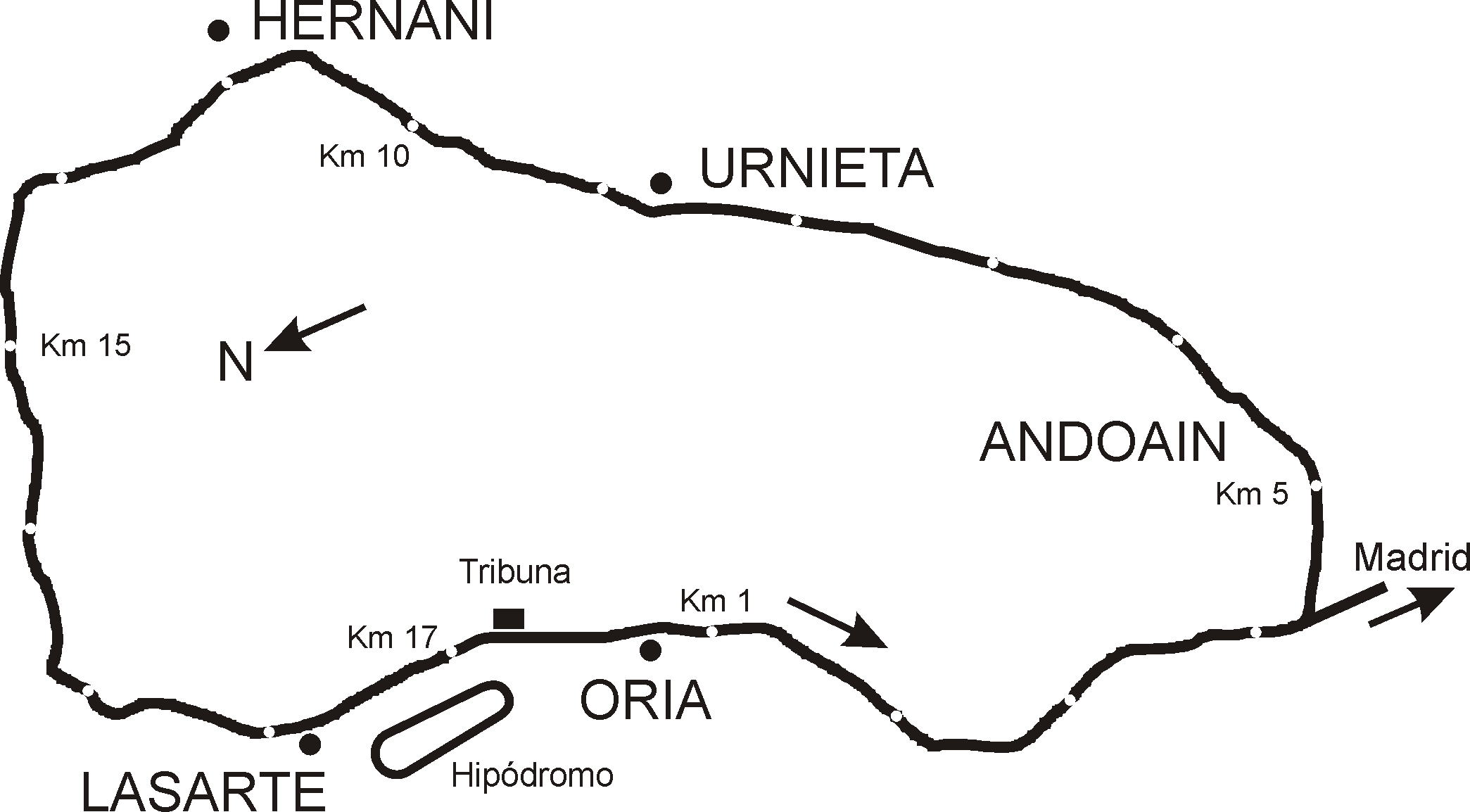

Race details
- Date: 18 July 1926
- Official name: IV Gran Premio de San Sebastián; IV Grand Prix d'Europe
- Location: San Sebastián, Spain
- Course: Circuito Lasarte
- Course length: 17.32 km (11.76 miles)
- Distance: 45 laps, 799.2 km (484.2 miles)

Pole position
Driver	(Italy) Bartolomeo Costantini	Bugatti
- Grid positions set by car number

Fastest lap
Driver	(France) Louis Wagner	Delage
- Time: 7:54.6

Podium
First	(France) Jules Goux	Bugatti
Second	(France) Edmond Bourlier; (France) Robert Sénéchal	Delage
Third	(Italy) Meo Costantini	Bugatti

The 1926 San Sebastián Grand Prix was a Grand Prix motor race held at Circuito Lasarte on 18 July 1926. It was also designated as the European Grand Prix.

It was the third race of the 1926 AIACR World Manufacturers' Championship season. The Delage 15 S 8 made its racing debut here but proved to be quite challenging to drive. The exhaust pipes of the Delage's passed beneath the floor where the drivers' feet were, causing them to gradually burn. The drivers had to take turns in the cars, in order to avoid serious injury.

As Robert Sénéchal was not listed as an official Delage reserve driver, after the race both cars he drove were disqualified, as well as the Bugatti driven by unofficial reserve driver Louis Dutilleux. However after an appeal to the AIACR Court of Appeals, these results were all reinstated as the officials had approved the driver changes during the race.

== Classification ==
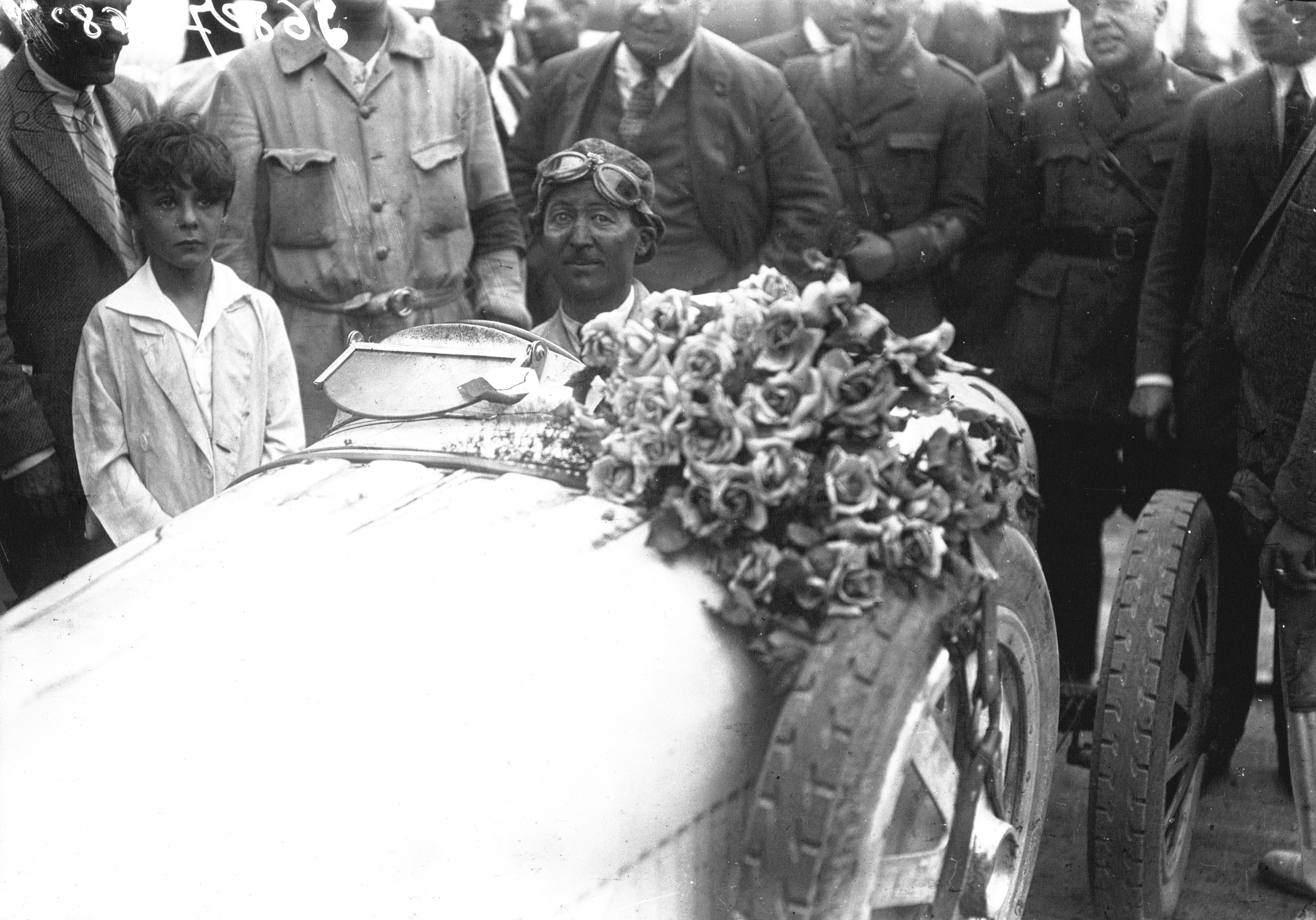
Winner Jules Goux

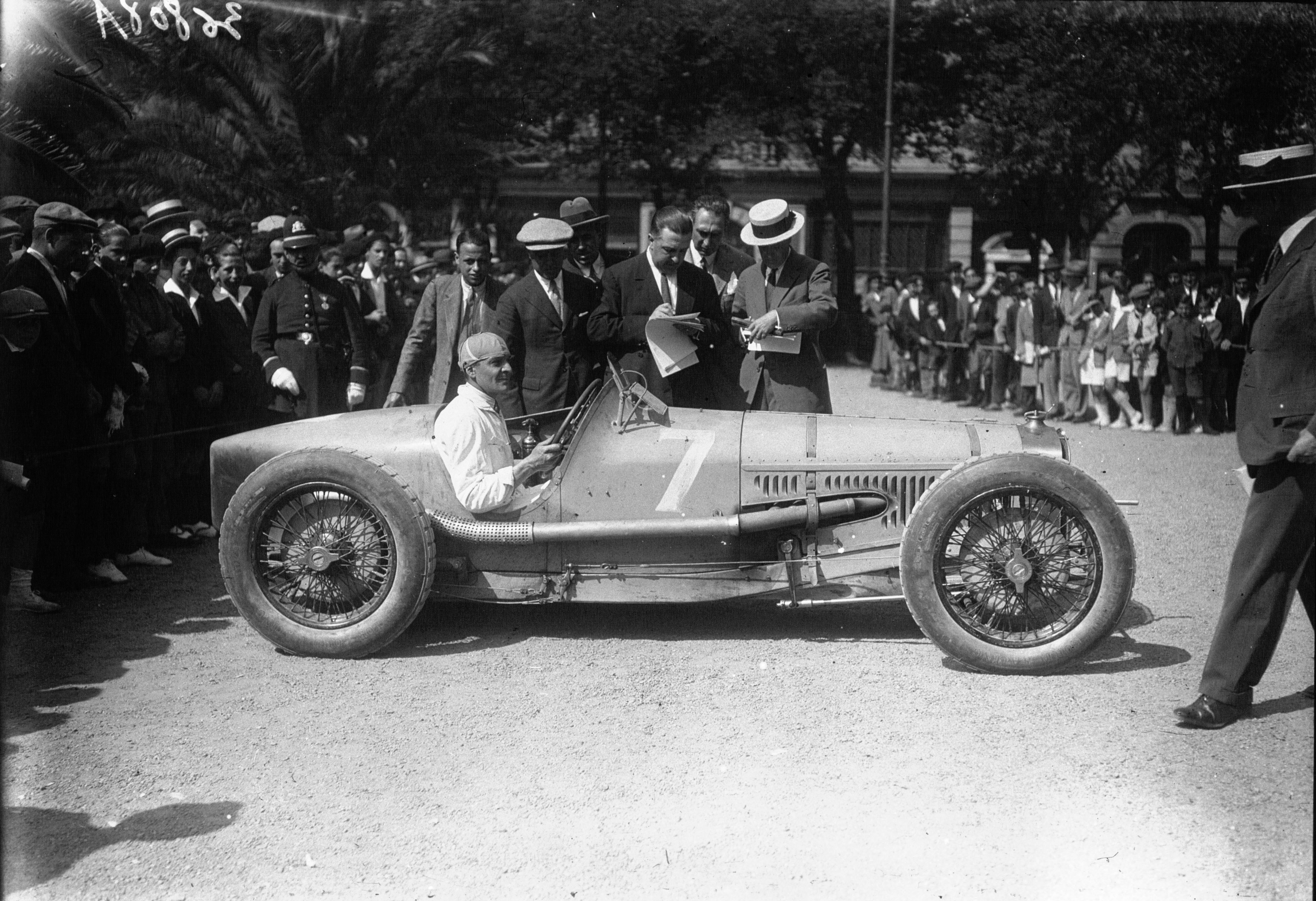
Robert Benoist

Pos	No	Driver	Car	Laps	Time/Retired
1	10	(France) Jules Goux	Bugatti T39A	45	6h51m52
2	15	(France) Edmond Bourlier (France) Robert Sénéchal	Delage 15 S 8	45	6h59m42
3	2	(Italy) Meo Costantini	Bugatti T39A	45	7h28m18
NC	22	(France) André Morel (France) Louis Wagner (France) Robert Benoist	Delage 15 S 8	41	7h35m22
NC	19	(Italy) Ferdinando Minoia (France) Louis Dutilleux	Bugatti T39A	41	7h35m36
NC	7	(France) Robert Benoist (France) Robert Sénéchal (France) Louis Wagner	Delage 15 S 8	33	7h26m31

Grand Prix Race
Previous race: 1926 French Grand Prix	1926 Grand Prix season Grandes Épreuves	Next race: 1926 British Grand Prix
Previous race: 1925 San Sebastián Grand Prix	San Sebastián Grand Prix	Next race: 1927 San Sebastián Grand Prix
Previous race: 1925 Belgian Grand Prix	European Grand Prix (Designated European Grand Prix)	Next race: 1927 Italian Grand Prix
