= Robert Sénéchal =

French racing driver (1892–1985)

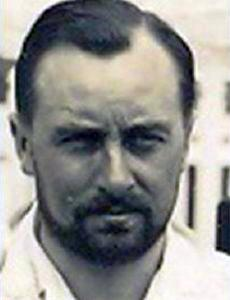
Robert Sénéchal in 1925

Robert Marie Georges Sénéchal (5 May 1892 – 30 July 1985) was a French industrialist/motor manufacturer, racing driver and pilot, noted for the car company bearing his name and for being the winner of the first-ever British Grand Prix.

== Early life ==
Sénéchal was born at Rocquencourt, in the Oise department in north-eastern France, to a family of grain merchants. After attending school in Amiens and in the Rue des Postes in Paris, he intended to study engineering at L'École Centrale, but contracted typhoid fever and was unable to take up his place. Instead, aged 19, he became associate director of a large garage near the Porte Champerret. in the 17th arrondissement of Paris, where he remained until called up for military service with the 5th Regiment of Dragoons, in 1912

== World War I ==
At the outbreak of World War I, Sénéchal transferred to the French Armée de l'air, qualifying as a pilot in 1916 and conducting artillery spotting missions. By the end of the War he was a lieutenant and a test pilot, having made 7,303 flights for a total of 1,300 hours across 33 different types of aircraft, and was awarded the Croix de Guerre.

== Motor manufacturer ==
Demobilised in 1919, Sénéchal assisted Pierre Delage (son of Louis Delage) in directing sales of surplus US military vehicles and parts, making sufficient money to enable him in 1921 to rescue the Éclair cyclecar company from impending insolvency, renaming the company "Cyclecars Robert Sénéchal" and retaining the 30 or so employees at its works in Rue Louis Blanc in Courbevoie. Aiming for the low-cost cyclecar market, the first Sénéchal car was powered by a 6 HP four-cylinder 750cc Ruby engine, with only two gears and no differential, resulting in a light but robust vehicle with a top speed of 80kmh.

Aided by the publicity generated by the marque's successes in competitions, the range of models produced by the company increased, to include larger-engined cyclecars and cars. At the end of 1923, Sénéchal entered into a five-year joint venture with Chenard & Walcker, who made Sénéchal cars at its Gennevilliers works until 1929. Between 1921 and 1929 around 5,000 Sénéchal cars were built.

Sénéchal ended his personal association with the manufacturing side of Chenard & Walcker in 1927, and acquired a garage on Boulevard Péreire in Paris and the "Auto Stand" showroom on the Champs Elysées. Here he operated as a dealer for Delage (reputedly as a consequence of winning a bet with Louis Delage, that he could drive one of Delage's cars from Nice to Paris in under 10 hours), Chenard and Walcker and Bugatti.

== Motor racing career ==
=== Early career ===
Sénéchal took part in his first competitive motor sport event in October 1921, driving a Sénéchal cyclecar in the annual Gaillon hill-climb, coming second overall and winning the 750cc class at over 85kmh. Over the following years, he competed in a wide variety of events, including hillclimbs, rallies, driving tests, circuit racing and endurance events with great success, and set a number of speed records. Among his notable successes were his three consecutive victories (1924–1926) in the Bol d’Or, a 24-hour endurance race for solo drivers, setting a distance record in 1926 that would last for 10 years. At the end of 1923, a year in which he had won the French Motorcycle Club's Cyclecar Grand Prix less than 48 hours after suffering a serious accident, Sénéchal was recognised as "Champion of France" and awarded the "Brassard d’Honneur".

=== Grand Prix career ===
Sénéchal's career as a grand prix driver began unexpectedly at the 1926 San Sebastián Grand Prix, when design flaws in the brand new Delage 15-S-8, making its first-ever race appearance, caused its drivers to suffer burnt hands and feet from its overheated cockpit and poisoning from its exhaust fumes. Only one reserve driver, Louis Wagner, was available for the three-car team, so Sénéchal – in San Sebastián for the touring car grand prix later in the week – stepped forward and offered to drive one of the cars, eventually being classified second with Edmond Bourlier on appeal after initially being disqualified as an unregistered driver.

Two weeks later, Sénéchal was rewarded with one of Delage's three entries in the first-ever British Grand Prix, held at Brooklands on 7 August 1926. However, it had been impossible for the team to solve the extreme overheating problems experienced at San Sebastián, but Sénéchal nevertheless managed to complete 83 of the 110 laps and was holding second place behind Robert Benoist's sister car when he was forced to stop and hand over to Wagner, who had retired his own car early on. Benoist was delayed by a lengthy pitstop a few laps later, and so Wagner brought Sénéchal's car to the chequered flag and the £1,000 winner's cheque.

=== Later racing career ===
Despite this success, Robert Sénéchal never raced for the factory Delage team in a grand prix again, although he did compete in several more grands prix as a privateer, including finishing 6th (and first in class) in his own Delage 15-S-8 at the 1930 French Grand Prix and 5th the following year, when he was the only driver to complete the 10-hour, 800-mile race solo. Meanwhile, in 1927 he won the Spa 24 hours race and, in 1929, the 8-day, 7,000 km "Circuit of the capitals". In September 1931, he was part of the team of Delage drivers who set a world 24-hour distance record (and nine other intermediate distance and speed records) at Montlhéry, although a serious accident in the Circuit of Lorraine in June 1931 had marked the effective end of his racing career and he soon afterwards returned to his true love, flying, establishing an aerial photography business

=== Other achievements ===
In 1924, Sénéchal was elected president of the Motocycle Club de France (MCF), a post he held for almost a decade. In 1925 he founded the Society of French Racing Drivers (l'Amicale des Coureurs Automobiles de France) and also held an official position at the Linas-Montlhéry autodrome.

== World War II ==
In 1939, Sénéchal was mobilised again and, aged 47, promoted to captain and appointed commander of a school for fighter pilots based near Montpellier.

== Later life ==
After World War II, Sénéchal was involved in a number of businesses, including motorcycle insurance and businesses selling ladies’ clothing, cakes and groceries. In 1964 he and his second wife relocated from Paris to Orleans, where they stayed until Sénéchal – who had finally retired in 1980, when he was aged 88 – suffered a hemiplegia at the end of 1983. Seriously handicapped by this, Sénéchal moved to Sanary-sur-Mer in the south of France, where he died on 30 July 1985.
