= Chiribiri =

Italian aircraft and automobile manufacturer

- Company type: Private
- Industry: AutomotiveAircraft
- Founded: 1910
- Fate: demised 1929
- Headquarters: Turin, Italy
- Key people: Antonio Chiribiri

Chiribiri was an aircraft and automobile manufacturer in Turin, Italy, from 1910 to 1929. Fabbrica Torinese Velivoli Chiribiri & C., (Chiribiri Aircraft of Turin), was founded by the Venetian Antonio Chiribiri, Maurizio Ramassotto and the engineer Gaudenzio Verga.

== History ==
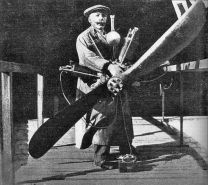
Antonio Chiribiri and a Miller aero-engine

Antonio 'Papà' Chiribiri was born in Venice in 1865 but it was not a natural city for engineering so he moved to Florence to work in a small factory. He quickly moved on to Zust and then Isotta Fraschini as a technical specialist in automobiles. In 1909, he joined the aeronautical manufacturer Miller Aircraft in Turin and took charge of technical design.

== Aircraft ==
In 1910, Antonio Chiribiri started his own company manufacturing spare parts and accessories for aeronautics, 'Fabrica Torinese Velivoli Chiribiri & C'. The company became known for the quality of its aircraft parts and grew to build at least one aircraft, the 'Chiribiri No. 5', 2 seater, tractor monoplane which flew in July 1912. It was 24 feet (7.3 m) long with a 31-foot (9.4 m)wingspan, weighed 770 lb (350 kg) and flew at 55 mph (90 km/h). But then Chiribiri was licensed to build 100 aeronautical motors for French engine manufacturer Gnome et Rhone, so aircraft production ceased. This success enabled Chiribiri to open a ‘flying school’ at the factory, training pilots who subsequently flew in World War I.

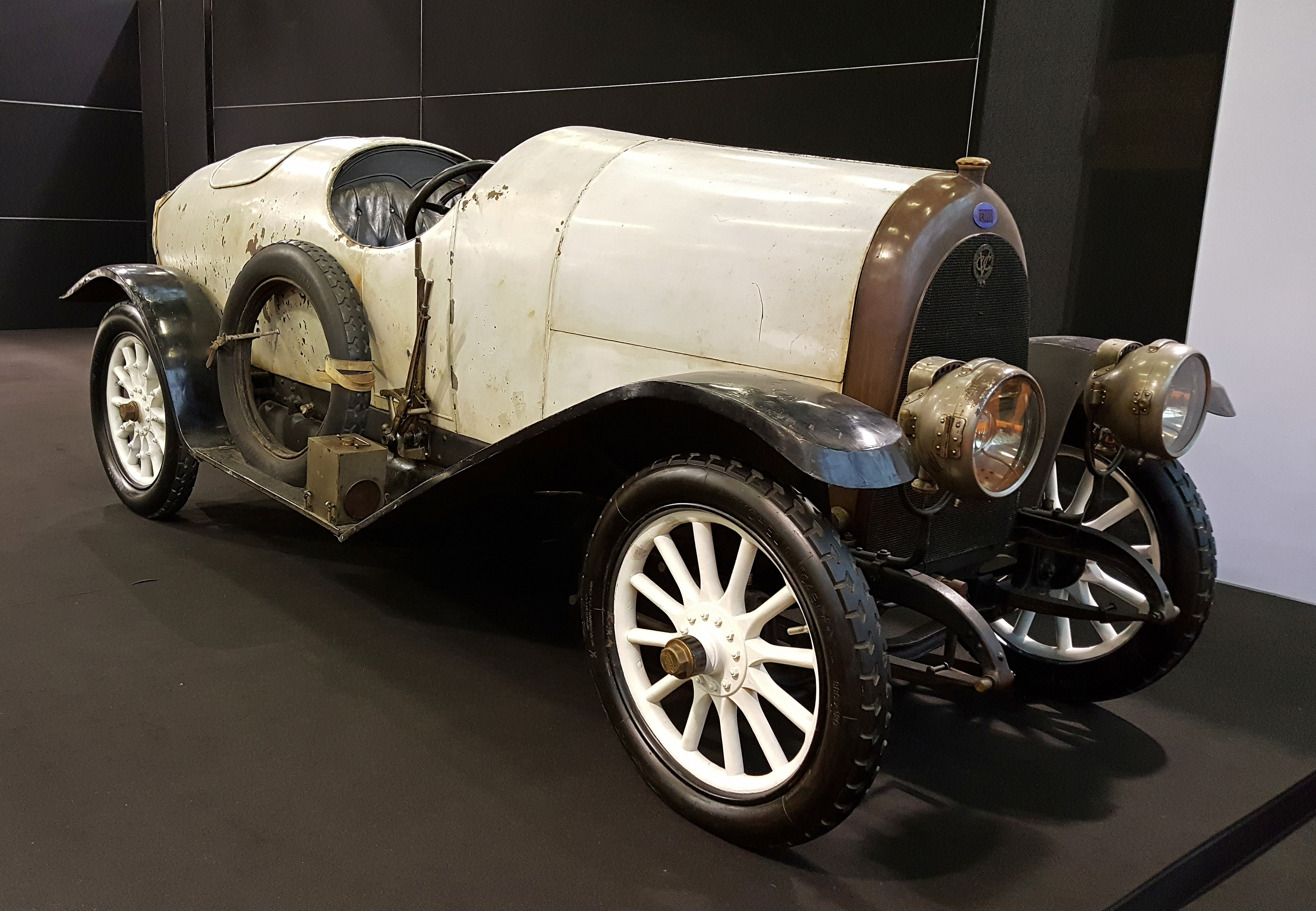
Chiribiri-engined Fiat speed record car

In 1918, a Fiat Chiribiri broke the world speed record for the timed kilometre from a flying start. The car had been built in 1913, and had a 8,000 cc inline-four Chiribiri aircraft engine producing 130 CV (96 kW) installed into a Fiat 50-60 HP chassis. It is usually considered the first monoposto made in Italy. At Monza it reached 160 km/h (99 mph) in the standing kilometer. It is currently displayed in the Mario Righini collection at the castle in Panzano, a frazione of Castelfranco Emilia, Italy.

== Cars ==
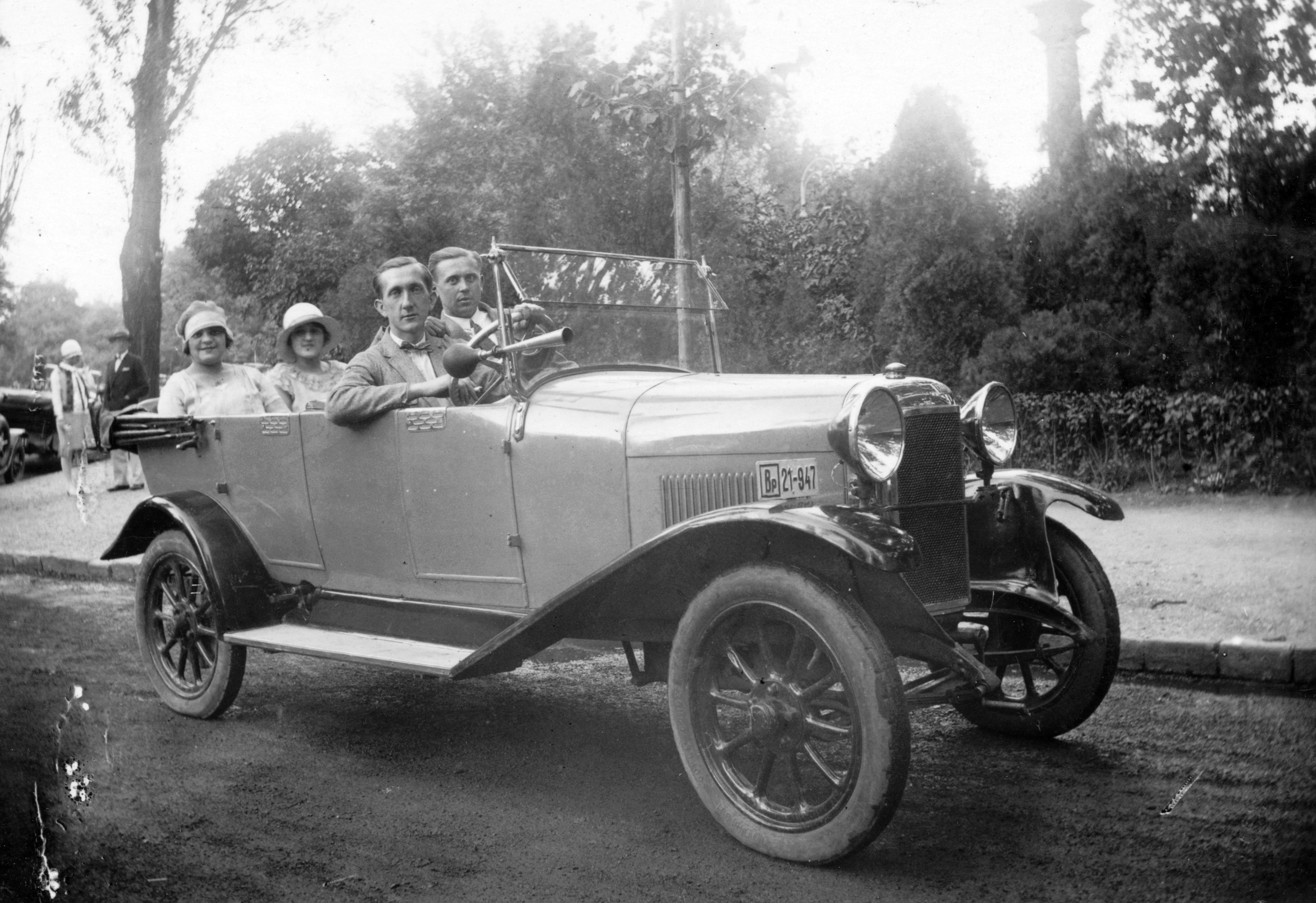
Chiribiri four-seater, 1926

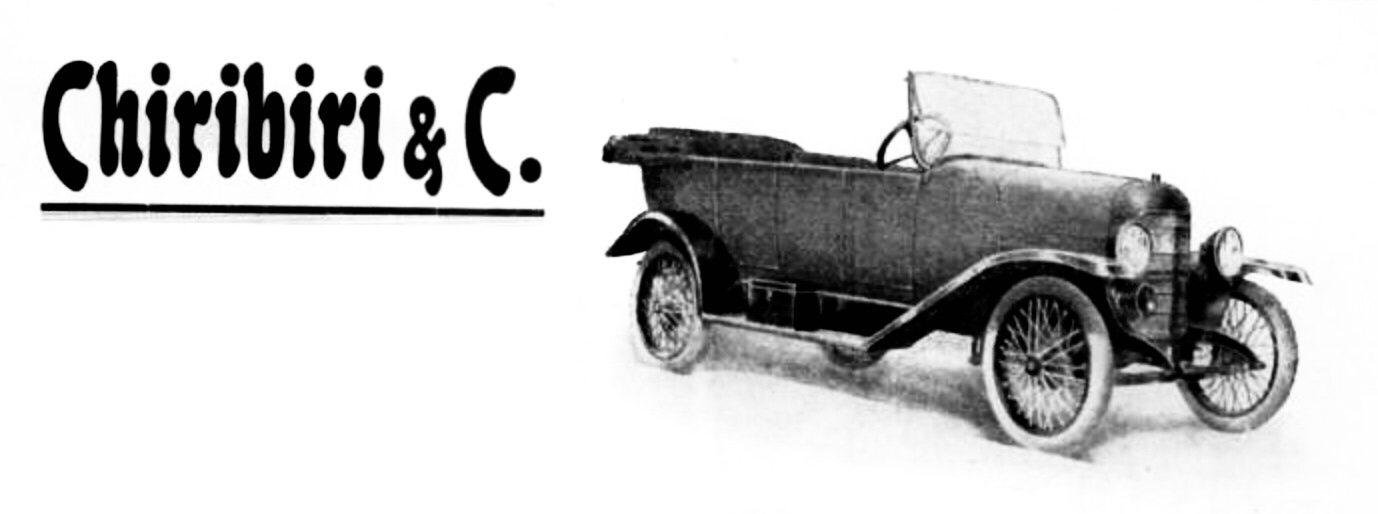
Chiribiri 19 hp (1923)

After their 1913 involvement with the land speed racer, Chiribiri started building production automobiles in earnest in 1914. Gustavo Brunetta d'Usseaux, a rich land owner, commissioned the construction of 100 examples of the ‘Siva’, a 980 cc economy car, but the financial side failed so Chiribri carried on alone. In 1915 they started a second production series with a larger chassis and 1300 cc, 12 hp (9 kW) engine, and continued throughout the war.

At the 1919 Paris Motor Show Chiribiri launched the 12 HP light car. This was an open-bodied four-seater with a 1593 cc, side-valve, 19 CV (14 kW), and an embryonic transaxle layout with the four-speed transmission mounted with the rear differential. It was rather successful, remaining in production until 1922. It was replaced by the 100 km/h ‘Roma 5000’ (Touring and Sport versions) with a 1499 cc engine producing 25–30 CV (18–22 kW) at 3,200 rpm. This was in turn developed into the 1924 Milano, with a 20 CV (15 kW) 1486 cc engine. A twin-cam version of this was sold as the Monza, either as a four-seater torpedo bodied tourer or as a 'Monza Corsa' for competition, eventually also available with a supercharger. The Monza was discontinued in 1927 while the Milano continued to be built until Chiribiri's demise.

=== Motor Racing ===
The racing debut of the Monza GT model in the hands of Ada Chiribiri, Amedeo Chiribiri, Tazio Nuvolari, Gigi Platé and I'inglese Scalese 'the Englishman' Jack Scales (Jan 29 1886-Oct 23 1962) brought three victories in the Susa-Moncenisio race, the Aosta-Gran San Bernardo race and the Voiturette GP at the Monza autodrome.

In 1921 Amedeo Chiribiri, racing under the pseudonym of Deo, won the 'Coppa della Cascine' in Florence and Mauro Ramassotto came second in the 2,000 cc class of the Rome Criterium.

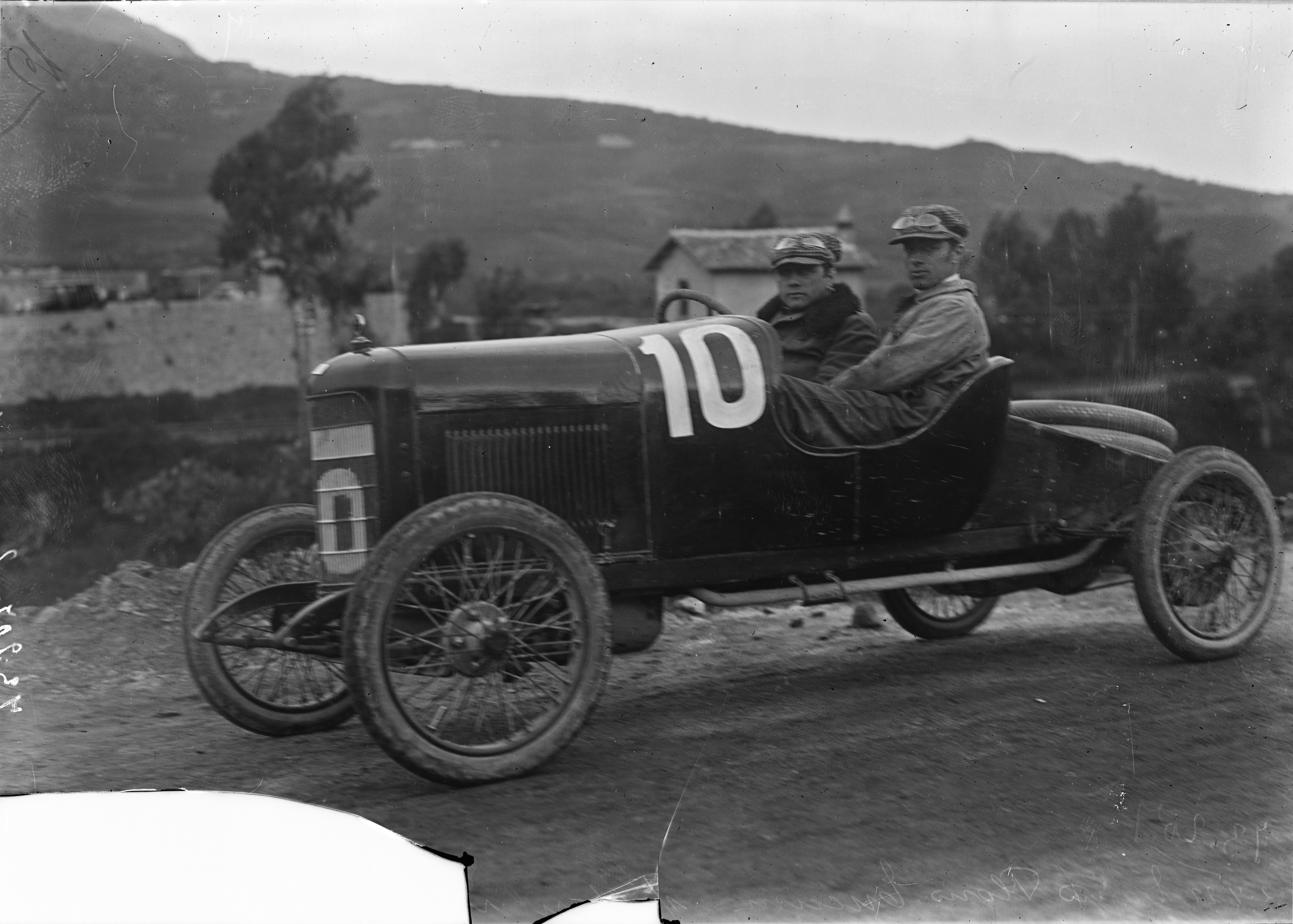
Mario Tuccimei with Chiribiri "Roma 5000" at Targa Florio 1922

In the 1922 2nd Grand Prix of Penya Rhin (Barcelona) at the Circuit de Vilafranca, a road circuit in the hills behind Sitges, Mauro Ramassotto finished 3rd and Amedeo Chiribiri set the fastest lap (112 km/h) for 'Voiturettes' up to 2000 cc.

In the 1923 3rd Grand Prix of Penya Rhin (Barcelona) at the Circuit de Vilafranca Tazio Nuvolari was 5th in the 1500 cc Chiribiri, and in the II Spanish Grand Prix at the banked Autodrom Sitges-Terramar, he finished 4th.

In 1924, Alete Marconcini was Italian National Champion driving a Chiribiri 12/16 to 3 victories in the Circuito di Belfiore, the Circuito di Cremona and the Circuito del Montenero. Additionally Tazio Nuvolari won the Circuito del Savio and the Circuito del Polesine, whilst Rodolfo Caruso won the Coppa della Perugina.

In 1926 Piroli, the riding mechanic, was killed at the Avus in Berlin on 9 July.

=== Road cars ===
In 1923 a road version was released with either a 45 CV (33 kW) engine or a new 65 CV (48 kW) version using 5,000 rpm. 2 years later a supercharger was added, delivering 95 CV (70 kW) at 5,700 rpm, and achieving 180 km/h (112 mph).

In 1927, the company diversified into diesel and industrial engines.

== Demise ==
In 1925, the company was revamped and the name was changed to 'Auto Costruzioni Meccaniche Chiribiri' but sales of road going vehicles were never high, due in large part to the poor performance of the side-valve Milano whilst its higher 'aeronautical' engineering quality standards necessitated higher pricing. So, despite the 1927 venture into diesel and industrial engines, when financial depression hit Europe the company closed on 3 September 1929, its assets being sold to Lancia.

== Family ==
Antonio Chiribiri died in April 1943. Amedeo, his son born in 1898, and Ada his daughter, had been his closest collaborators and team members, having won races, hill climbs and rallies.

== See also ==
- List of Italian companies
