= Bartolomeo Costantini =

Italian aviator and racing driver (1889–1941)

Bartolomeo "Meo" Costantini
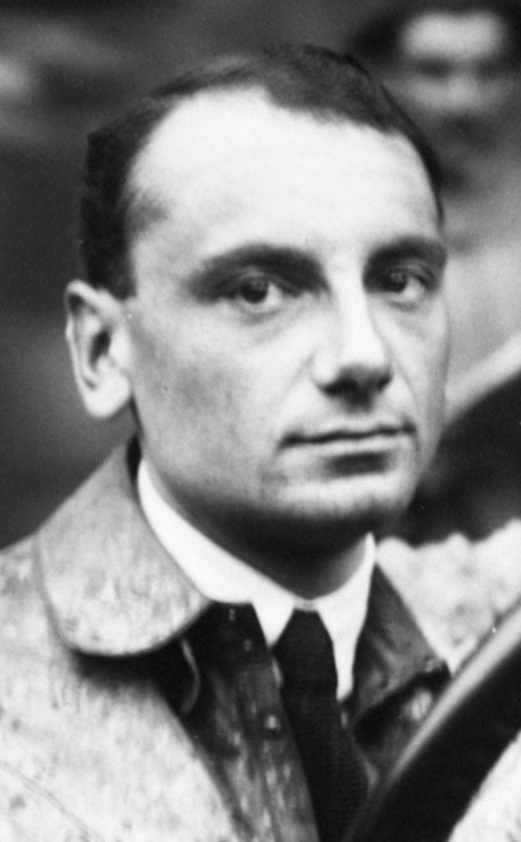
- Born: 14 February 1889; Vittorio Veneto
- Died: 19 July 1941 (aged 52); Milan
- Occupation: aviator racing car driver,

Bartolomeo "Meo" Costantini (14 February 1889 in Vittorio Veneto – 19 July 1941 in Milan) was an Italian aviator and racing car driver, known for being the sporting manager of the Bugatti car manufacturer.

== Military service ==
He joined the Italo-Turkish War (1911), and later became well known in World War I, where capitano Costantini became a flying ace with six victories flying a Spad in the Squadriglia degli Assi, part of the Corpo Aeronautico Militare.

Costantini used a Spad VII to score his first aerial victory in conjunction with Prince Fulco Ruffo di Calabria, on 25 October 1917. The next day, Costantini shot down another Aviatik reconnaissance plane over Castelmonte. A month later, on 23 November, he shared his third victory over a two-seater with Cesare Magistrini. A week later, he had another shared win. He did not score again for nine months. In August 1918, he acquired a newer Spad XIII that he used to round off his career. On the 12th, he singlehandedly defeated an Albatros D.III near Lucia di Piave. Ten days later, he flamed a two-seater over Marano di Piave and watched its observer parachute away.

== Motor racing career ==
Costantini was a racing driver in the Aquila Italiana team (1914–17). He joined Bugatti (1923) and won two Targa Florio in a Bugatti Type 35 (1925–26), won the Circuito Lasarte (1926), and in chassis #4802 of Type 39, got second in French GP (1926). He remained racing team manager until 1935, replaced by Jean Bugatti.
