= Bugatti Grand Prix results =

Motor racing team record

These are the complete European Championship and World Championship Grand Prix results for Automobiles Ettore Bugatti, the works Bugatti team.

== Grand Prix results ==
=== Complete European Championship results ===
(key) (results in bold indicate pole position, results in italics indicate fastest lap)

Year	Entrant	Chassis	Engine	Drivers	1	2	3	4	5	6	7
1931	Automobiles Ettore Bugatti	Bugatti T51	2.3 L8		ITA	FRA	BEL				
1931	Automobiles Ettore Bugatti	Bugatti T51	2.3 L8	(Italy) Achille Varzi	Ret	1	Ret				
1931	Automobiles Ettore Bugatti	Bugatti T51	2.3 L8	(Monaco) Louis Chiron	Ret	1	Ret				
1931	Automobiles Ettore Bugatti	Bugatti T51	2.3 L8	(France) Albert Divo	3	7	Ret				
1931	Automobiles Ettore Bugatti	Bugatti T51	2.3 L8	(France) Guy Bouriat	3	7	Ret				
1931	Automobiles Ettore Bugatti	Bugatti T51	2.3 L8	(United Kingdom) William Grover-Williams		Ret	1				
1931	Automobiles Ettore Bugatti	Bugatti T51	2.3 L8	(Italy) Caberto Conelli		Ret	1				
1931	J.-P. Wimille	Bugatti T51	2.3 L8	(France) Jean-Pierre Wimille	4	Ret	Ret				
1931	J.-P. Wimille	Bugatti T51	2.3 L8	(France) Jean Gaupillat	4	Ret	Ret				
1931	M. Lehoux	Bugatti T51	2.3 L8	(France) Marcel Lehoux	Ret	Ret					
1931	M. Lehoux	Bugatti T51	2.3 L8	(France) Philippe Étancelin	Ret	Ret					
1931	Earl Howe	Bugatti T51	2.3 L8	(United Kingdom) Earl Howe		12					
1931	Earl Howe	Bugatti T51	2.3 L8	(United Kingdom) Brian Lewis		12					
1931	B. Ivanowsky	Bugatti T35B	2.3 L8	(Italy) Emilio Eminente		Ret					
1931	B. Ivanowsky	Bugatti T35B	2.3 L8	(France) Edmond Bourlier		Ret					
1931	Conte d'Arnoux	Bugatti T35C	2.0 L8	(France) Georges d'Arnoux		Ret					
1931	Conte d'Arnoux	Bugatti T35C	2.0 L8	(France) Max Fourny		Ret					
1931	E. Grimaldi	Bugatti T35C	2.0 L8	(Italy) Enzo Grimaldi		Ret					
1931	E. Grimaldi	Bugatti T35C	2.0 L8	"Borgait"		Ret					
1932	Automobiles E. Bugatti	Bugatti T54	5.0 L8		ITA	FRA	GER				
1932	Automobiles E. Bugatti	Bugatti T54	5.0 L8	(Italy) Achille Varzi	Ret	Ret					
1932	Automobiles E. Bugatti	Bugatti T54	5.0 L8	(Monaco) Louis Chiron	Ret						
1932	Automobiles E. Bugatti	Bugatti T54	5.0 L8	(France) Albert Divo		Ret					
1932	Automobiles E. Bugatti	Bugatti T51	2.3 L8	(France) Albert Divo	6		DNS				
1932	Automobiles E. Bugatti	Bugatti T51	2.3 L8	(France) Guy Bouriat	6†						
1932	Automobiles E. Bugatti	Bugatti T51	2.3 L8	(Monaco) Louis Chiron		4	Ret				
1932	Automobiles E. Bugatti	Bugatti T51	2.3 L8	(Italy) Achille Varzi			DNS				
1932	R. Dreyfus	Bugatti T51	2.3 L8	(France) René Dreyfus	5	5	4				
1932	M. Lehoux	Bugatti T51	2.3 L8	(France) Marcel Lehoux	Ret		Ret				
1932	M. Lehoux	Bugatti T54	5.0 L8	(France) Marcel Lehoux		Ret					
1932	"Williams"	Bugatti T51	2.3 L8	(United Kingdom) William Grover-Williams		6					
1932	Earl Howe	Bugatti T54	5.0 L8	(United Kingdom) Earl Howe		9					
1932	Earl Howe	Bugatti T54	5.0 L8	(United Kingdom) Hugh Hamilton		9†					
1932	M. Fourny	Bugatti T51	2.3 L8	(France) Max Fourny		Ret					
1932	J. Gaupillat	Bugatti T51	2.3 L8	(France) Jean Gaupillat		**Ret**					
1932	Pilesi Racing Team	Bugatti T51	2.3 L8	(Germany) Hans Lewy			Ret				
1932	Pilesi Racing Team	Bugatti T35B	2.3 L8	(Germany) Paul Pietsch			Ret				
1935	Automobiles E. Bugatti	Bugatti T59/50S	4.9 L8		MON	FRA	BEL	GER	SUI	ITA	ESP
1935	Automobiles E. Bugatti	Bugatti T59/50S	4.9 L8	(France) Robert Benoist		Ret					
1935	Automobiles E. Bugatti	Bugatti T59	3.3 L8	(France) Robert Benoist			5				6
1935	Automobiles E. Bugatti	Bugatti T59	3.3 L8	(Italy) Piero Taruffi			6	Ret		5	
1935	Automobiles E. Bugatti	Bugatti T59	3.3 L8	(France) Jean-Pierre Wimille			Ret			Ret	**4**
1935	Earl Howe	Bugatti T59	3.3 L8	(United Kingdom) Earl Howe	Ret				10		
1935	G. Léoz-Abad	Bugatti T51	2.3 L8	(Spain) Genaro Léoz-Abad							Ret
1936	Automobiles E. Bugatti	Bugatti T59	3.3 L8		MON	GER	SUI	ITA			
1936	Automobiles E. Bugatti	Bugatti T59	3.3 L8	(France) Jean-Pierre Wimille	6	**Ret**					
1936	Automobiles E. Bugatti	Bugatti T59	3.3 L8	(United Kingdom) William Grover-Williams	9						
1936	Automobiles E. Bugatti	Bugatti T59/50B	4.7 L8	(France) Jean-Pierre Wimille			Ret				
1936	W. Rens	Bugatti T51	2.3 L8	(Netherlands) J. Walter Rens		Ret					
1936	Earl Howe	Bugatti T59	3.3 L8	(United Kingdom) Earl Howe			Ret				
1937	M. Walther	Bugatti T35B	2.3 L8		BEL	GER	MON	SUI	ITA		
1937	M. Walther	Bugatti T35B	2.3 L8	(Czechoslovakia) Martin Walther				DNS			
1938	Automobiles E. Bugatti	Bugatti T59/50B3	3.0 L8		FRA	GER	SUI	ITA			
1938	Automobiles E. Bugatti	Bugatti T59/50B3	3.0 L8	(France) Jean-Pierre Wimille	Ret						

- † Indicates shared drive, no points for the driver who took over

=== Grandes Épreuves results ===
(key)

Year	Entrant	Chassis	Engine	Driver	1	2	3	4	5	6
1929	Automobiles Ettore Bugatti	Bugatti T35B	2.3 L8		500	FRA				
1929	Automobiles Ettore Bugatti	Bugatti T35B	2.3 L8	(France) Albert Divo		4				
1929	Automobiles Ettore Bugatti	Bugatti T35B	2.3 L8	(Italy) Caberto Conelli		3				
1929	Automobiles Ettore Bugatti	Bugatti T35B	2.3 L8	(United Kingdom) William Grover-Williams		1				
1930	Automobiles Ettore Bugatti	Bugatti T35C	2.0 L8		500	EUR	FRA			
1930	Automobiles Ettore Bugatti	Bugatti T35C	2.0 L8	(France) Albert Divo		3	DNA			
1930	Automobiles Ettore Bugatti	Bugatti T35C	2.0 L8	(France) Guy Bouriat		2	Ret			
1930	Automobiles Ettore Bugatti	Bugatti T35C	2.0 L8	(Monaco) Louis Chiron		1	Ret			
1930	Automobiles Ettore Bugatti	Bugatti T35C	2.0 L8	(United Kingdom) William Grover-Williams			Ret			
1931	Automobiles Ettore Bugatti	Bugatti T51	2.3 L8		GER					
1931	Automobiles Ettore Bugatti	Bugatti T51	2.3 L8	(Monaco) Louis Chiron	2					
1931	Automobiles Ettore Bugatti	Bugatti T51	2.3 L8	(Italy) Achille Varzi	3					
1931	Automobiles Ettore Bugatti	Bugatti T51	2.3 L8	(France) Albert Divo	DNS					
1931	Automobiles Ettore Bugatti	Bugatti T51	2.3 L8	(France) Guy Bouriat	7					
1931	Automobiles Ettore Bugatti	Bugatti T51	2.3 L8	(United Kingdom) William Grover-Williams	Ret					
1933	Automobiles Ettore Bugatti	Bugatti T51/T59	2.3 L8		MON	FRA	BEL	ITA	ESP	
1933	Automobiles Ettore Bugatti	Bugatti T51/T59	2.3 L8	(France) René Dreyfus	3	DNA	3	DNA	6	
1933	Automobiles Ettore Bugatti	Bugatti T51/T59	2.3 L8	(Italy) Achille Varzi	**1**	DNA	2	DNA	4	
1933	Automobiles Ettore Bugatti	Bugatti T51/T59	2.3 L8	(United Kingdom) William Grover-Williams	7	DNA	6	DNA	DNS	
1933	Automobiles Ettore Bugatti	Bugatti T51/T59	2.3 L8	(France) Albert Divo		DNA			DNS	
1934	Automobiles Ettore Bugatti	Bugatti T59	3.0 L8		MON	FRA	GER	BEL	ITA	ESP
1934	Automobiles Ettore Bugatti	Bugatti T59	3.0 L8	(France) René Dreyfus	3	Ret		1		7
1934	Automobiles Ettore Bugatti	Bugatti T59	3.0 L8	(France) Robert Benoist	DNS	4		4		
1934	Automobiles Ettore Bugatti	Bugatti T59	3.0 L8	(France) Jean-Pierre Wimille	Ret	Ret				6
1934	Automobiles Ettore Bugatti	Bugatti T59	3.0 L8	(Italy) Tazio Nuvolari		Ret				3
1934	Automobiles Ettore Bugatti	Bugatti T59	3.0 L8	(Italy) Antonio Brivio				2	Ret	11

=== Complete Formula One results ===
(key) (Results in bold indicate pole position; results in italics indicate fastest lap)

Year	Chassis	Engine(s)	Tires	Drivers	1	2	3	4	5	6	7	8	WCC	Pts
1956	Bugatti T251	Bugatti 2.5 L8	**D**		ARG	MON	500	BEL	FRA	GBR	GER	ITA	—N/a^{1}	—N/a^{1}
1956	Bugatti T251	Bugatti 2.5 L8	**D**	(France) Maurice Trintignant					Ret				—N/a^{1}	—N/a^{1}

^{1} The World Constructors' Championship was not awarded before 1958.

=== Racing victories ===
Year	Race	Driver	Car
1921	(Italy) Gran Premio delle Vetturette	Ernest Friderich	
1925	(Italy) Targa Florio	Bartolomeo Costantini	Type 35
1926	(France) French Grand Prix	Jules Goux	Type 39 A
1926	(Italy) Italian Grand Prix	"Sabipa"	
1926	(Spain) Spanish Grand Prix	Bartolomeo Costantini	
1926	(Italy) Targa Florio	Bartolomeo Costantini	Type 35 T
1927	(Italy) Italian Grand Prix	Tazio Nuvolari	Type 35 C
1927	(Italy) Targa Florio	Emilio Materassi	Type 35 C
1928	(France) French Grand Prix	William Grover-Williams	Type 35 C
	(Italy) Italian Grand Prix	Louis Chiron	
	(Spain) Spanish Grand Prix	Louis Chiron	
	(Italy) Targa Florio	Albert Divo	Type 35 B
1929	(France) French Grand Prix	William Grover-Williams	Type 35 B
	(Germany) German Grand Prix	Louis Chiron	
	(Spain) Spanish Grand Prix	Louis Chiron	
	Monaco Grand Prix	William Grover-Williams	Type 35 B
	(Italy) Targa Florio	Albert Divo	Type 35 C
1930	(Belgium) Belgian Grand Prix	Louis Chiron	
	(Czechoslovakia) Czechoslovakian Grand Prix	Heinrich-Joachim von Morgen and Hermann zu Leiningen	
	(France) French Grand Prix	Philippe Étancelin	Type 35 C
	Monaco Grand Prix	René Dreyfus	
1931	(Belgium) Belgian Grand Prix	William Grover-Williams and Caberto Conelli	
	(Czechoslovakia) Czechoslovakian Grand Prix	Louis Chiron	
	(France) French Grand Prix	Louis Chiron and Achille Varzi	Type 51
	Monaco Grand Prix	Louis Chiron	
1932	(Czechoslovakia) Czechoslovakian Grand Prix	Louis Chiron	
1933	(Czechoslovakia) Czechoslovakian Grand Prix	Louis Chiron	
	Monaco Grand Prix	Achille Varzi	
1934	(Belgium) Belgian Grand Prix	René Dreyfus	
1936	(France) French Grand Prix	Jean-Pierre Wimille and Raymond Sommer	Type 57 G
1937	(France) 24 hours of Le Mans	Jean-Pierre Wimille and Robert Benoist	Type 57 G
1939	(France) 24 hours of Le Mans	Jean-Pierre Wimille and Pierre Veyron	Type 57 C
