= 1930 San Sebastián Grand Prix =

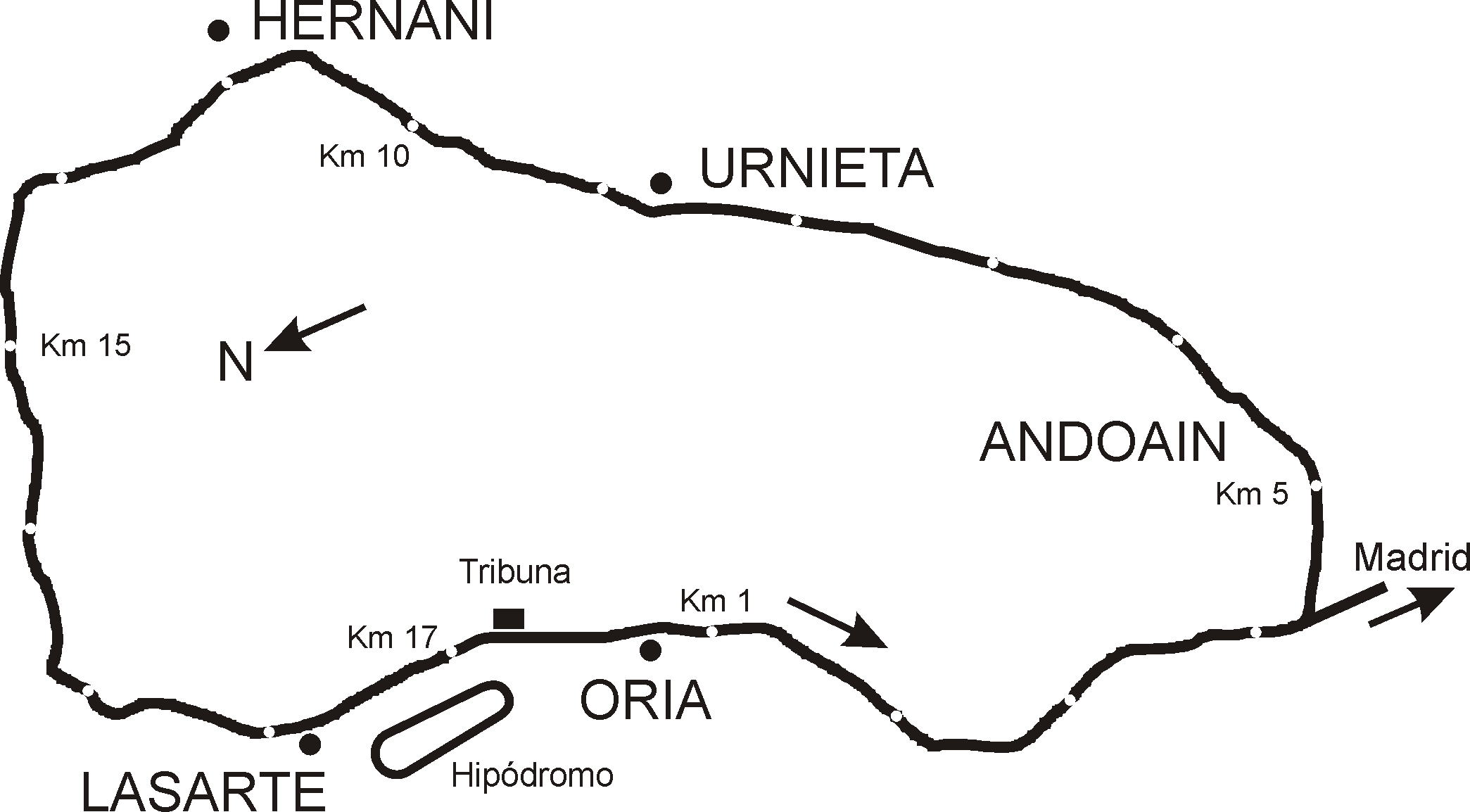

Race details
- Date: 5 October 1930
- Official name: VIII Gran Premio de San Sebastián
- Location: Circuito Lasarte; San Sebastián, Spain
- Course: Road course
- Course length: 17.315 km (10.760 miles)
- Distance: 30 laps, 519.5 km (322.8 miles)
- Weather: Sunny

Pole position
Driver	(Italy) Filippo Sartorio	Maserati
- Grid positions set by car number

Fastest lap
Driver	(Italy) Achille Varzi	Maserati
- Time: 7:05.3 on lap 8

Podium
First	(Italy) Achille Varzi	Maserati
Second	(Italy) Aymo Maggi	Maserati
Third	(France) Henri Stoffel	Peugeot

The 1930 San Sebastián Grand Prix was a Grand Prix motor race held at the Circuito Lasarte on 5 October 1930. The Italian driver Achille Varzi won the race in a works Maserati, ahead of his teammate Aymo Maggi and the privateer Peugeot of Henri Stoffel.

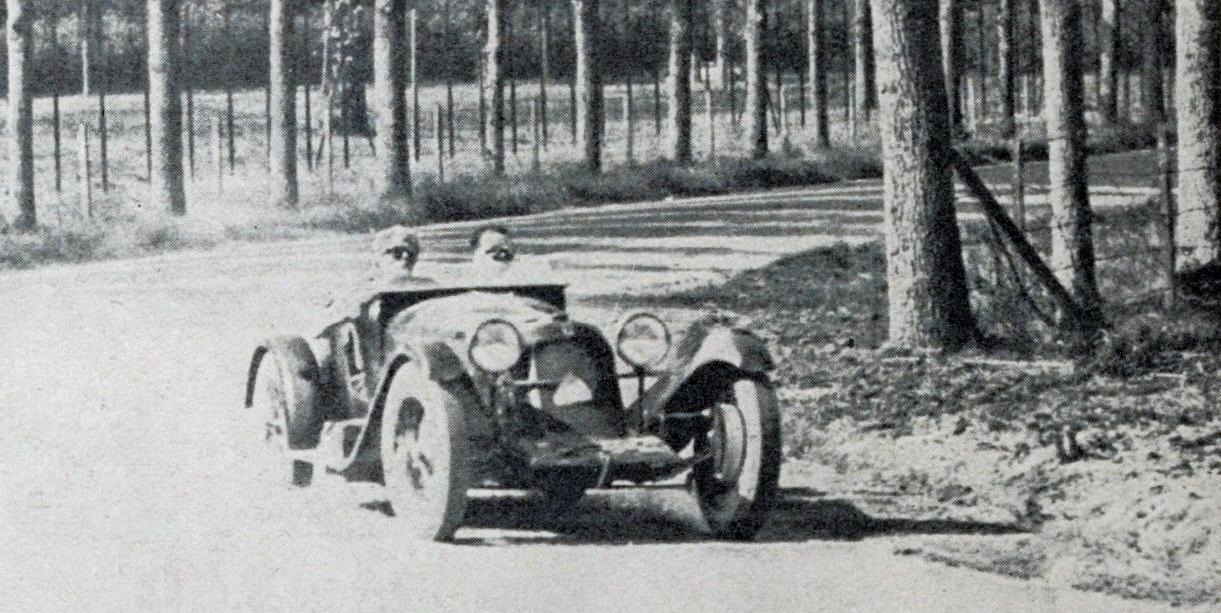
Achille Varzi drives his Maserati 26M towards victory in this race.

== Entries ==
No	Driver	Entrant	Constructor	Chassis	Engine
1	(Italy) Arrigo Sartorio	Private entry	Maserati	Maserati 26R	1.7 L8
2	(France) Henri Stoffel	Private entry	Peugeot	Peugeot 174 S	4.0 L4
3	(France) Robert Sénéchal	Private entry	Delage	Delage 15 S 8	1.5 L8
4	(France) Philippe Étancelin	Private entry	Bugatti	Bugatti T35C	2.0 L8
5	(France) Ferdinand Montier	Private entry	Montier Ford	Montier Ford Special	3.3 L4
6	(Italy) Baconin Borzacchini	Scuderia Ferrari	Alfa Romeo	Alfa Romeo P2	2.0 L8
7	(France) René Ferrand	Private entry	Peugeot	Peugeot 174 S	4.0 L4
8	(Italy) Achille Varzi	Officine Alfieri Maserati	Maserati	Maserati 26M	2.5 L8
9	(France) Charles Montier	Private entry	Montier Ford	Montier Ford Special	3.3 L4
10	(France) Jean de Maleplane	Private entry	Bugatti	Bugatti T35C	2.0 L8
11	(Italy) Tazio Nuvolari	Scuderia Ferrari	Alfa Romeo	Alfa Romeo P2	2.0 L8
12	(Italy) Aymo Maggi	Officine Alfieri Maserati	Maserati	Maserati 26M	2.5 L8
14	(France) Marcel Lehoux	Private entry	Bugatti	Bugatti T35B	2.3 L8
15	(France) René Dreyfus	Private entry	Bugatti	Bugatti T35B	2.3 L8
16	(Italy) Filippo Sartorio	Private entry	Maserati	Maserati 26	1.5 L8
18	(France) Jean de l'Espée	Private entry	Bugatti	Bugatti T35C	2.0 L8
19	(Chile) Juan Zanelli	Private entry	Bugatti	Bugatti T35B	2.3 L8
20	(Netherlands) Cor John van Hulzen	Private entry	Bugatti	Bugatti T35B	2.3 L8
21	(France) Guy Daniel	Private entry	Bugatti	Bugatti T35B	2.3 L8
22	(France) Max Fourny	Private entry	Bugatti	Bugatti T35C	2.0 L8
23	Claude Arthez	Private entry	Bugatti	Bugatti T35	2.0 L8

== Starting grid ==
Starting grid — 1930 San Sebastián Grand Prix
		(Italy) F. Sartorio; Maserati
	(France) Stoffel; Peugeot	(Italy) F. Sartorio; Maserati
(France) Étancelin; Bugatti	(France) Stoffel; Peugeot	
		(France) F. Montier; Montier Ford
	(France) Ferrand; Peugeot	(France) F. Montier; Montier Ford
(Italy) Varzi; Maserati	(France) Ferrand; Peugeot	
		(France) C. Montier; Montier Ford
	(France) de Maleplane; Bugatti	(France) C. Montier; Montier Ford
(Italy) Maggi; Maserati	(France) de Maleplane; Bugatti	
		(France) Lehoux; Bugatti
	(France) Dreyfus; Bugatti	(France) Lehoux; Bugatti
(France) de l'Espée; Bugatti	(France) Dreyfus; Bugatti	
		(Chile) Zanelli; Bugatti
	(Netherlands) van Hulzen; Bugatti	(Chile) Zanelli; Bugatti
(France) Fourny; Bugatti	(Netherlands) van Hulzen; Bugatti	

Note: grid slots were allocated in numerical order.

== Classification ==
=== Race ===
Pos	No	Driver	Car	Laps	Time/Retired	Grid
1	8	(Italy) Achille Varzi	Maserati 26M	30	3:43:05	6
2	12	(Italy) Aymo Maggi	Maserati 26M	30	+21:58	9
3	2	(France) Henri Stoffel	Peugeot 174 S	30	+25:43	2
4	7	(France) René Ferrand	Peugeot 174 S	30	+27:05	5
5	22	(France) Max Fourny	Bugatti T35C	30	+30:53	15
6	10	(France) Jean de Maleplane	Bugatti T35C	30	+32:41	8
7	1	(Italy) Filippo Sartorio (Italy) Arrigo Sartorio	Maserati 26R	30	+35:23	1
8	5	(France) Ferdinand Montier	Montier Ford Special	26	Flagged off	4
Ret	15	(France) René Dreyfus	Bugatti T35B	25	Crash/fuel problem	11
Ret	19	(Chile) Juan Zanelli	Bugatti T35B	24	Crash	13
Ret	14	(France) Marcel Lehoux	Bugatti T35B	21	Driveshaft	10
Ret	18	(France) Jean de l'Espée	Bugatti T35C	17	Engine	12
Ret	20	(Netherlands) Cor John van Hulzen	Bugatti T35B	15	Crash, fire	14
Ret	4	(France) Philippe Étancelin	Bugatti T35C	10	Crash	3
Ret	9	(France) Charles Montier	Montier Ford Special	8		7
DNS	16	(Italy) Filippo Sartorio	Maserati 26		Started in #1 car	
DNA	3	(France) Robert Sénéchal	Delage 15 S 8		Did not appear	
DNA	6	(Italy) Baconin Borzacchini	Alfa Romeo P2		Did not appear	
DNA	11	(Italy) Tazio Nuvolari	Alfa Romeo P2		Did not appear	
DNA	21	(France) Guy Daniel	Bugatti T35B		Did not appear	
DNA	23	Claude Arthez	Bugatti T35		Did not appear	

Grand Prix Race
1930 Grand Prix season
Previous race: 1929 San Sebastián Grand Prix	San Sebastián Grand Prix	Next race: none
