= Ferdinand Montier =

French racing driver

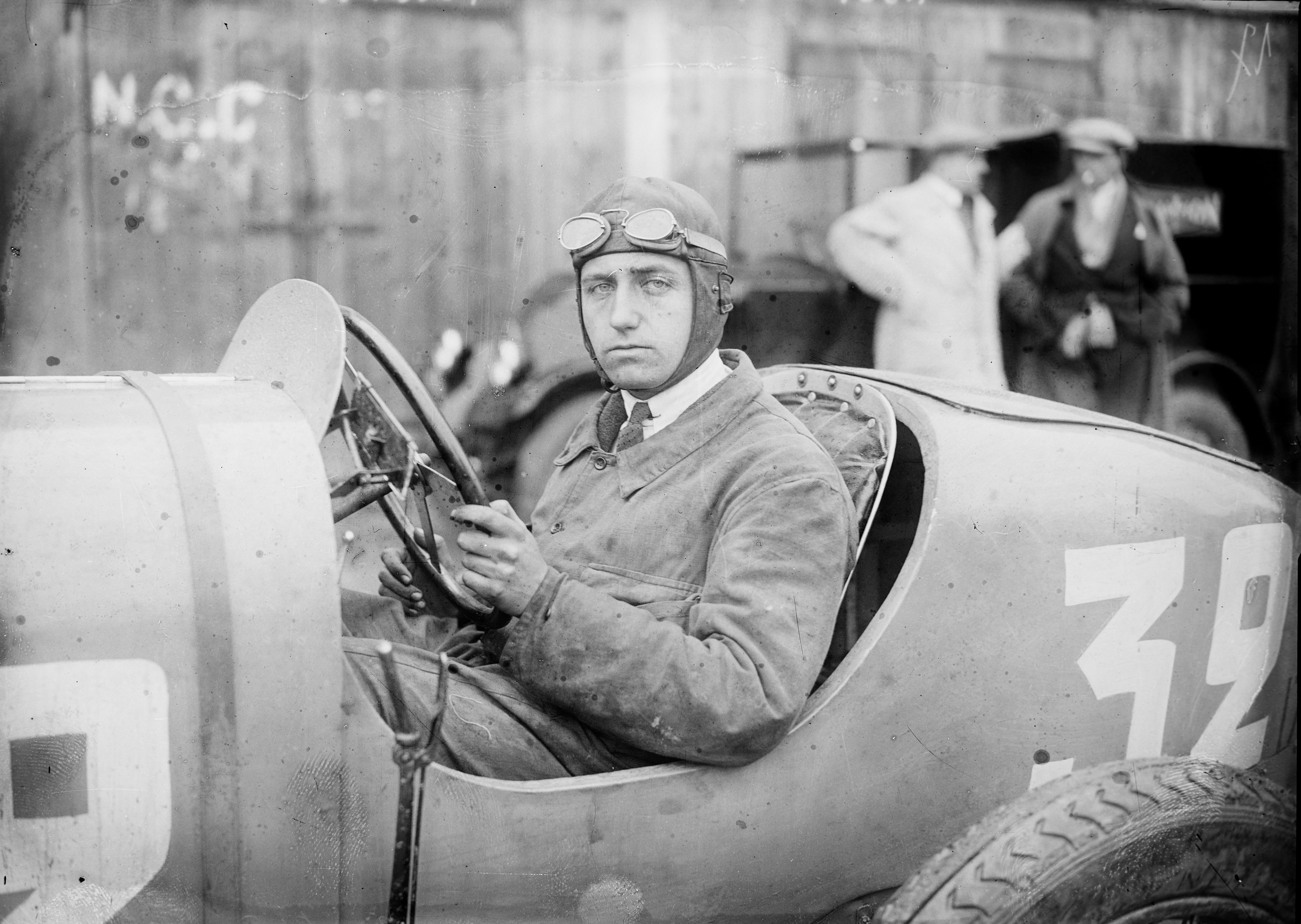
- Ferdinand Montier, Circuit de Montlhéry, 1 July 1927.jpg
- Nationality: French
- Born: 6 September 1909
- Died: 8 October 1996 (aged 87)
- Relatives: Charles Montier

Previous series
- 1929–1935 1931: Grand Prix; AIACR European Championship

Ferdinand Montier (1909–1996) (named in some reports as "Francois Montier") was a French racing driver active in Grand Prix motor racing.

== Background ==
Ferdinand Montier was the son of Parisian automotive engineer and racing driver Charles Montier. The Montiers, father and son, raced the Ford-based "Montier Specials" produced by the father's company, Charles Montier et Cie.

== Grand Prix ==
Montier entered but did not finish the 1929 Dieppe Grand Prix.

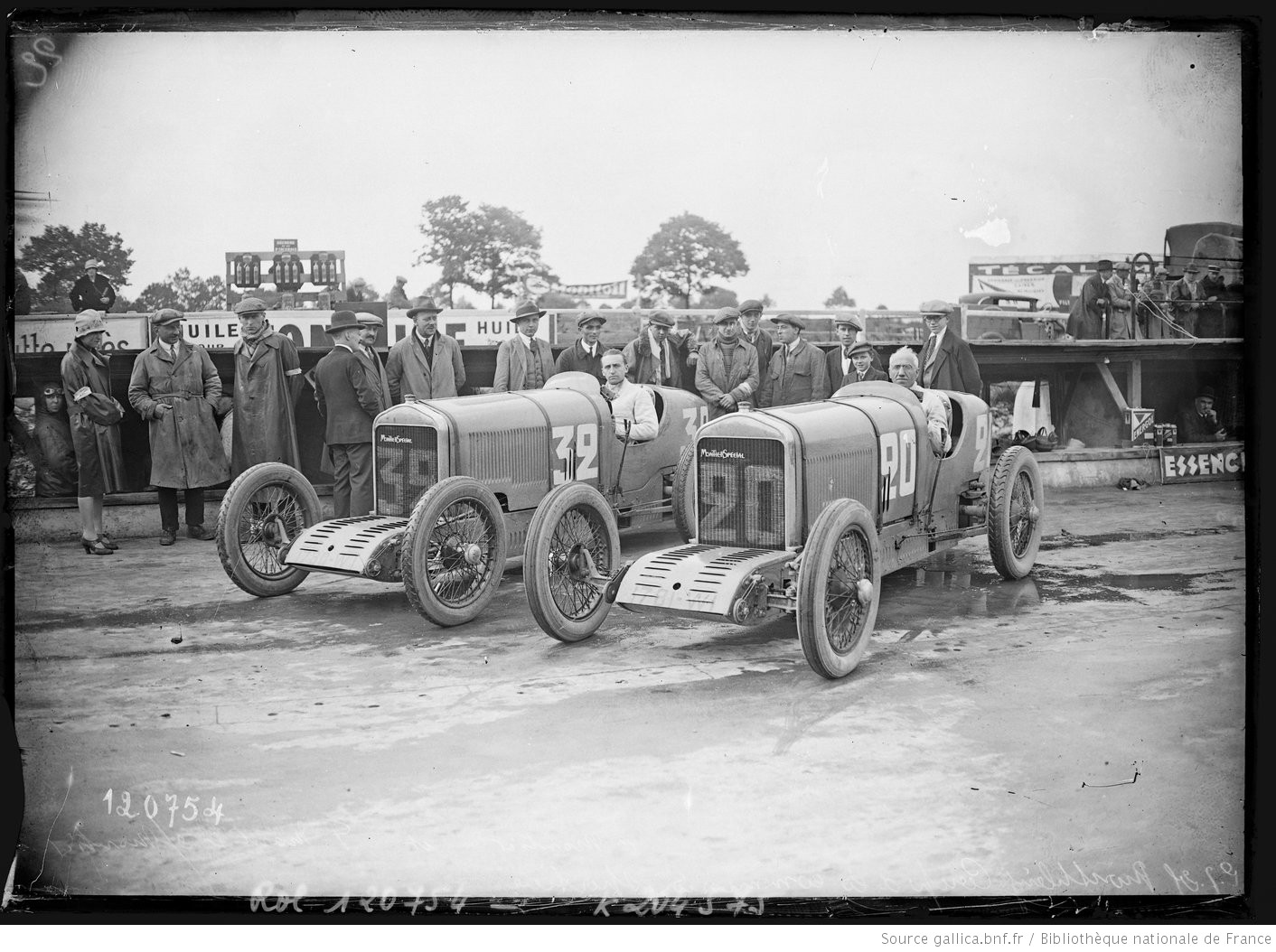
Ferdinand Montier (left) and Charles Montier (right) in Montier Specials at the Coupe de la Commission Sportive on the weekend of the 1927 French Grand Prix

He finished 11th in the 1930 Picardy Grand Prix but did not finish the 1930 Belgian Grand Prix after running out of fuel. Montier notched up another DNF in the 1930 French Grand Prix and was flagged off in 8th place in the 1930 San Sebastián Grand Prix, ahead only of retirees.

A 10th place finish was secured in the 1931 Casablanca Grand Prix and 11th at the 1931 Dieppe Grand Prix, one place behind his father. Montier also entered the 1931 Belgian Grand Prix - a round of the inaugural AIACR European Championship. He failed to finish due to mechanical issues but his participation nonetheless earned him 21st place in the drivers championship.

Montier finished the 1932 Picardy Grand Prix in 6th and on the lead lap, 3 places ahead of his father. Ferdinand arrived at the 1932 La Baule Grand Prix with a Montier Special now sporting two engines (instead of the Ford Model A-derived 3.3L straight 4 used hitherto); for the second race in succession he finished 6th and on the lead lap.

Montier finished 13th in the 1933 Dieppe Grand Prix in a Ford V8-powered Montier Special, 11 laps behind the winner. He entered the 1933 La Baule Grand Prix and 1935 Lorraine Grand Prix but did not appear at either event.

== Racing record ==
=== Complete European Championship results ===
Year	Entrant	Chassis	Engine	1	2	3	EDC	Pts
1931	(France) Ferdinand Montier	Montier-Ford	Ford 3.3L S4	ITA	FRA	BEL; DNF	21st	21
