= Charles Montier =

Racing driver, engineer, and entrepreneur

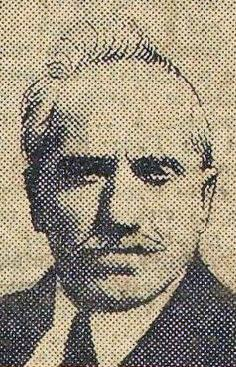
- Montier in 1925
- Nationality: French
- Born: Charles Pierre Elie Montier; 28 June 1879 Naples
- Died: June 1952 (aged 72–73) Paris
- Relatives: Ferdinand Montier

Previous series
- 1923–1925 1929–1935 1931: 24 Hours of Le Mans; Grand Prix; AIACR European Championship
24 Hours of Le Mans career
- Years: 1923 ● 1924 ● 1925
- Teams: Établissements Charles Montier et Cie
- Best finish: 14th

Charles Pierre Elie Montier (28 June 1879 – June 1952) was a French racing driver and automotive engineer whose race entries included the inaugural 24 Hours of Le Mans.

Montier, with his father Elie and friend Gillet, built a steam car – the Montier & Gillet – which was exhibited in Paris in 1897. Montier went into the business of selling and servicing cars, becoming one of the two agents of the Ford Motor Company in France. After gaining experience as a racer and hillclimber, Montier entered the 1923 24 Hours of Le Mans, alongside Albert Ouriou, in a Ford Model T-derived, but heavily modified, "Montier Special". Montier and Ouriou finished the race in 14th place of 33 starters; they also entered but did not place in the 1924 and 1925 events.

Montier and his son Ferdinand raced Montier Specials in the Coupe de la Commission Sportive event, a support race to the 1927 French Grand Prix before turning their attention to Grand Prix racing proper. Charles entered the Belgian Grand Prix on three occasions, his 1931 entry earning him 20th place in the first European Championship. Montier's last recorded Grand Prix entry, and finish, was the 1935 Lorraine Grand Prix; he was 56 years old at the time.

== Early years ==
Aged 15, Montier – with his father Elie and friend Gillet – built his first car, the Montier & Gillet, a steam-powered wagonette steered by a tiller. The sole example was exhibited in Paris in 1897.

Montier entered the automotive industry, working for Darracq among others, later going into business as Charles Montier et Cie, selling and modifying Fords first in Tours in 1911 and then Paris, as one of the two Ford agents in France.

== 24 Hours of Le Mans ==
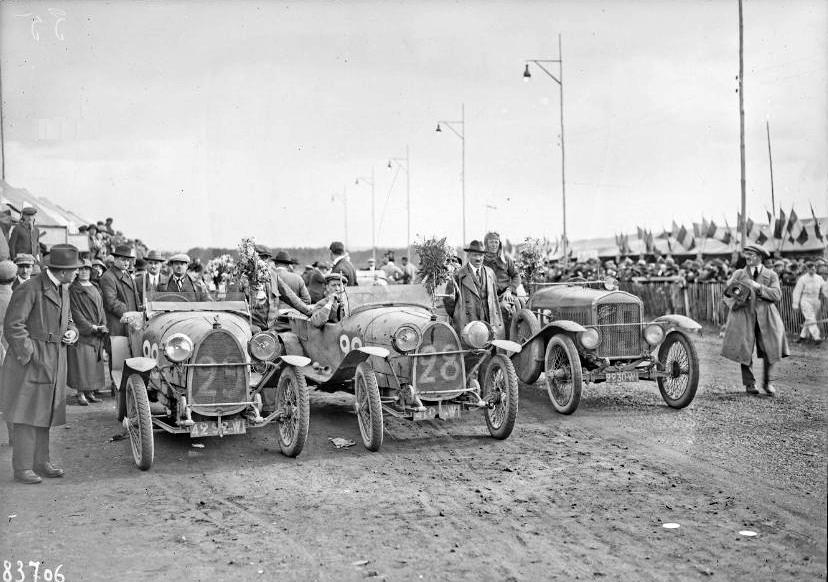
Pictured (right), the Montier Special number 19 of Charles Montier and Albert Ouriou at the inaugural 24 Hours of Le Mans (1923)

An experienced racer and hillclimber, Montier entered the Grand Prix d' Endurance de 24 Heures, also known as the 1923 24 Hours of Le Mans, alongside Albert Ouriou. This was the first running of Le Mans, which was to become one of the most prestigious motor races in the world.

The Ford Model T was a mass-produced, mass-market vehicle – in the words of Henry Ford, "a motor car for the great multitude... so low in price that no man making a good salary will be unable to own one"; 1.8 million were sold in 1923 alone. Montier added two rear seats to the Model T – hanging over the back of the rear axle – to comply with the Automobile Club de l'Ouest's regulations; he also modified the cylinder head, camshaft, brakes, and gearbox to make his Montier Special. The "dainty" Montier-Ford has since been called "perhaps the best Model T-based speedster ever created from the pedestrian farmer's fliver".

Thirty-three cars started the race; Montier and Ouriou finished in 14th place.

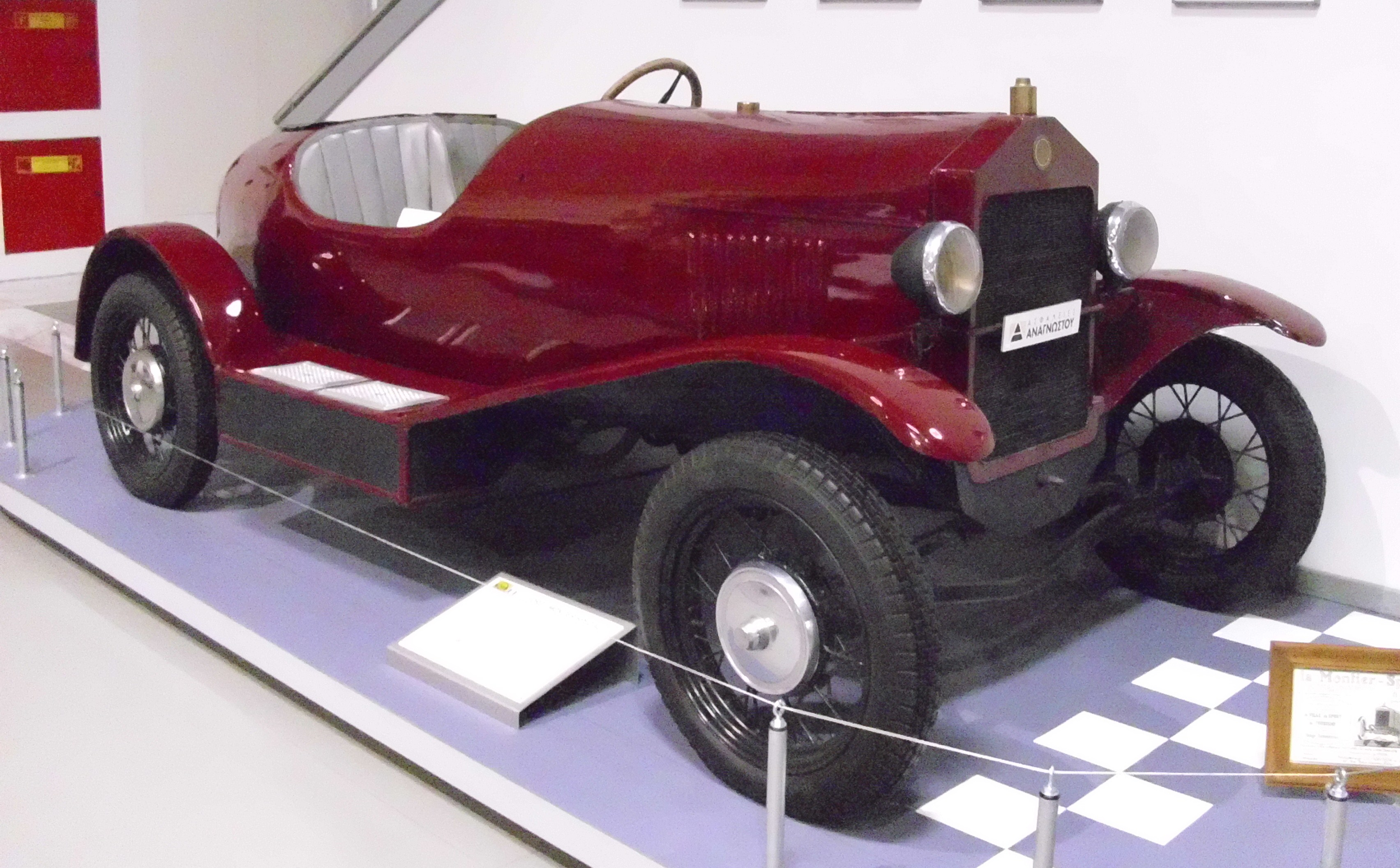
A 1924 Montier Ford

Montier returned to Le Mans in 1924 with his modified Ford special, now fitted with 4-wheel brakes. Again Montier drove it himself with his brother-in-law Albert Ouriou. The Montier Special was last away as it proved difficult to start. The car retired on lap 40 with engine problems.

The duo's third and final attempt at Le Mans, in 1925, was also unsuccessful as they were unclassified due to only completing 54 of the 117 laps required.

== Grand Prix ==
Alongside the Le Man entries, Charles continued hillclimbing; and he and his son Ferdinand raced Montier Specials in the Coupe de la Commission Sportive event, a support race to the 1927 French Grand Prix.

The Montiers turned their attention to racing Ford Model A-based Montier Specials in Grand Prix and endurance races at numerous events between 1929 and 1935. The cars had lowered chassis and many engine modifications.

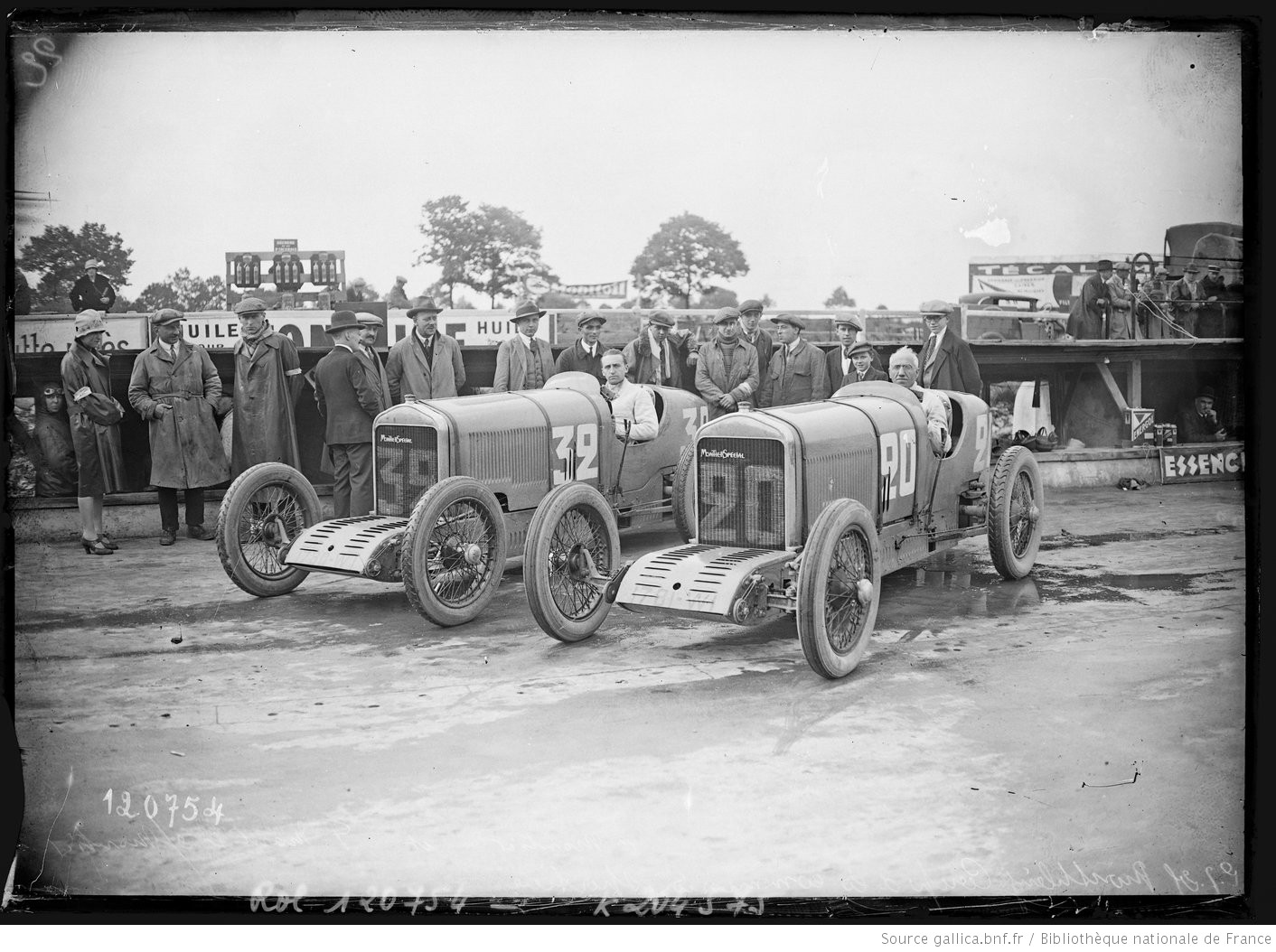
Ferdinand Montier (left) and Charles Montier (right) in Montier Specials at the Coupe de la Commission Sportive on the weekend of the 1927 French Grand Prix

Both men entered – and both failed to finish – the 1929 Dieppe Grand Prix. Montier Senior finished 6th in the 1930 Belgian Grand Prix (a Grandes Épreuves event but not a championship event as no championship was awarded in the 1930 Grand Prix season (Note: The Grandes Épreuves were "the most important events of the year, comparable in importance to the grand prix races of present times".)), but was not classified in the 1930 French Grand Prix and retired from the 1930 San Sebastián Grand Prix.

Championship races in the 1931 Grand Prix season were endurance races of 10 hours duration with 2 drivers assigned to each car. Montier entered the 1931 Belgian Grand Prix championship event with co-driver "Ducolombier", finishing 8th, 30 laps down. (Note: Researcher Hans Etzrodt has Montier placed 7th.) (Note: Contrary to other sources, Motor Sport's database lists the race as non-Championship. This is likely erroneous as the same magazine's report of August 1931 referred to the event as "the final race for the 1931 Championship of Europe".) Montier also ran in two non-championship rounds that year: the 1931 Casablanca Grand Prix, which he did not finish, and the 1931 Dieppe Grand Prix where he finished 10th.

Montier entered only one Grand Prix as a driver in the 1932 season, the 1932 Picardy Grand Prix where he finished 9th. A Montier Special with Ferdinand at the wheel turned up at the 1932 La Baule Grand Prix, however; the car on this occasion sported two engines "mounted in tandem for a total of 4072cc capacity" instead of the Ford Model A-derived 3.3L straight 4 used hitherto.

No Grand Prix entries as a driver are recorded for Charles Montier in 1933, but Ferdinand entered the 1933 Dieppe Grand Prix in a Ford V8-powered Montier Special.

Montier entered the Belgian Grand Prix for the third and last time in 1934, at the age of 55. This race was a Grandes Épreuves because there was again no championship awarded in that year. Seven cars qualified, but only five completed the race; Montier came home 5th in his Ford V8-powered Special. The race was won by René Dreyfus in his Bugatti Type 59 – the last Grandes Épreuves victory for the famous marque. Montier also entered the 1934 U.M.F. Grand Prix.

The rainy 1935 Grand Prix at the Orléans Circuit was stopped on lap 7 due to an accident involving Marcel Buffy's Bugatti Type 51; Buffy's car crashed into the crowd, hitting 12 spectators and fatally wounding one of them. Montier, one lap down, was classified 3rd. It is unclear from contemporary reports, but researcher Leif Snellman believes Montier may have been driving the twin-engine car but it may have been the V8.

Charles Montier's final grand prix was the 1935 Lorraine Grand Prix. This may have been in the V8-powered car. Montier placed 10th of the 16 entrants and 12 finishers.

== Racing record ==
=== Complete 24 Hours of Le Mans results ===
Year	Team	Co-Driver	Chassis	Engine	Tyre	Laps	Pos.
1923	(France) Établissements Charles Montier et Cie	(France) Albert Ouriou	Montier Special (Ford Model T)	Montier 2008cc S4	M	97	14th
1924	(France) Établissements Charles Montier et Cie	(France) Albert Ouriou	Montier Special (Ford Model T)	Montier 1996cc S4	E	40	DNF
1925	(France) Établissements Charles Montier et Cie	(France) Albert Ouriou	Montier Special (Ford Model T)	Montier 2.9L S4	E	54	DSQ

=== Complete European Championship results ===
Year	Entrant	Co-Driver	Chassis	Engine	1	2	3	EDC	Pts
1931	(France) Charles Montier	"Ducolombier"	Montier-Ford	Ford 3.3L S4	ITA	FRA	BEL; 8th	20th	21

== Bibliography ==
- Chris Martin: Charles Montier and his French Racing Fords, 2022 Amazon books - ISBN 979-8-8377-5701-3
- Chris Martin; Charles Montier Sorcier de la Ford T , 2022 Amazon books - ISBN 979-8-8358-1535-7
- RM Clarke: Le Mans. The Bentley & Alfa Years 1923-1939. Brooklands Books, Cobham 1999, ISBN 1-85520-465-7
