= Ferdinando Minoia =

Italian racing driver (1884–1940)

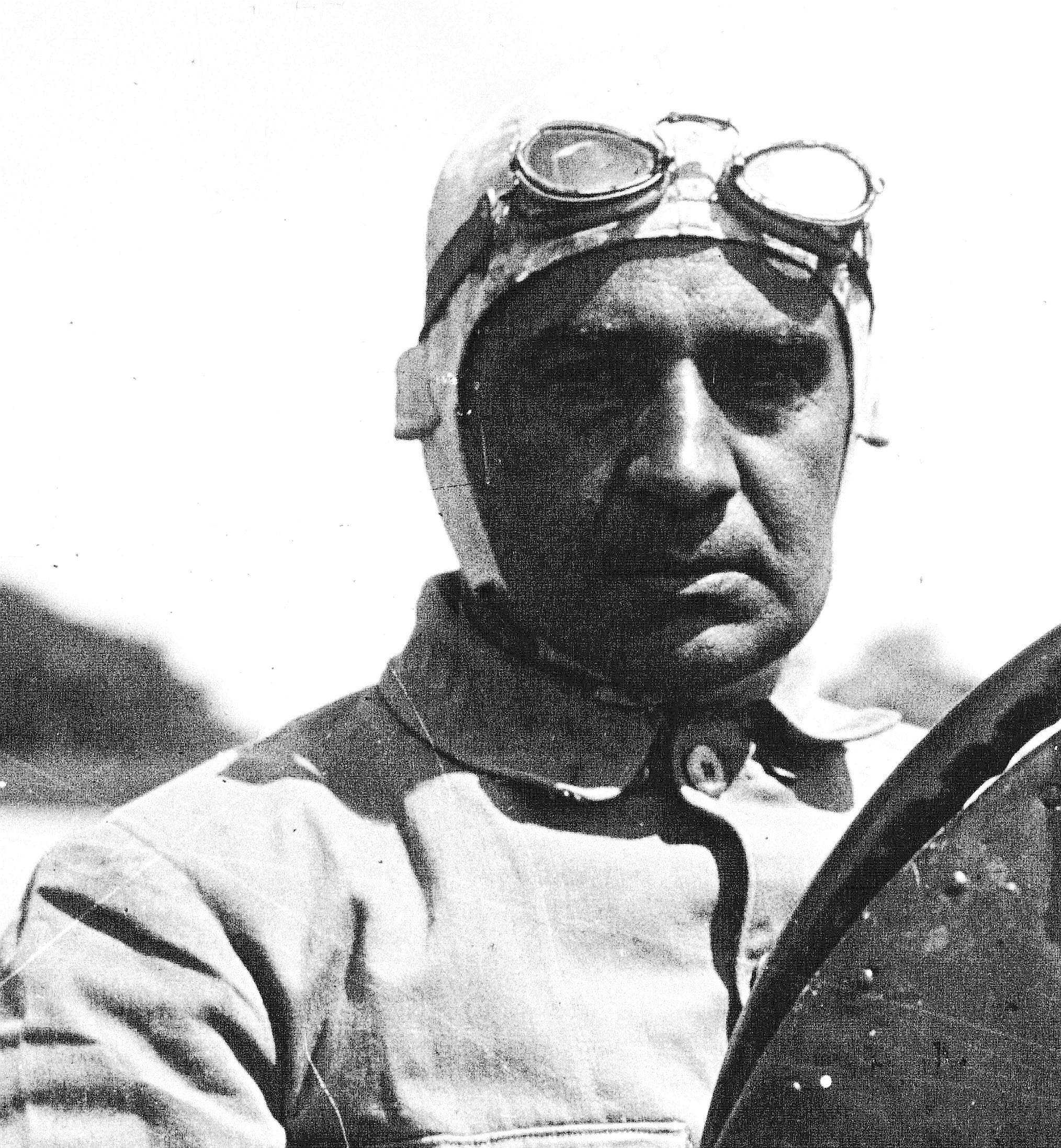
- Minoia in 1931
- Nationality: (Italy) Italian
- Born: 2 June 1884 Milan, Kingdom of Italy
- Died: 28 June 1940 (aged 56) Milan, Kingdom of Italy

European Championship
- Years active: 1931
- Teams: Alfa Romeo
- Starts: 3
- Wins: 0
- Podiums: 2
- Poles: 1
- Fastest laps: 0

Championship titles
- 1931: Drivers' Championship

Ferdinando "Nando" Minoia (2 June 1884 – 28 June 1940) was an Italian racing driver with an exceptionally long, distinguished and varied career. In 1907, he won the Coppa Florio driving an Isotta Fraschini. In 1923, he drove the world’s first mid-engine Grand Prix car, the Benz Tropfenwagen. In 1927, he won the inaugural Mille Miglia driving an OM. Finally, in 1931 he became the first European Champion, driving for Alfa Romeo, but without winning a single event.

== Career notes and milestones ==
In 1907, he won the Coppa Florio and the 50,000 Lira prize at the Corse di Brescia driving an Isotta Fraschini for 485.7 km (301.8 mi) in 4 hours 39 minutes.

At the 1922 Targa Florio, he drove for the 7-car Mercedes team that won the event, but his supercharged car did not finish.

At the 1923 Italian Grand Prix at Monza he finished fourth in another German world’s first, a mid-engine Grand Prix car, the Benz RH Tropfenwagen, still naturally aspirated and trailing behind the superior supercharged Fiats. Based on the Rumpler Tropfenwagen’s ground breaking design, it used a 1991 cc, 6 cylinder, twin cam Benz engine delivering only 65 bhp (48 kW). Along with the radiator, it was mounted behind the driver in the ‘tear drop’ design. The car also featured swing axle independent rear suspension and inboard brakes.

In 1924, at the Targa Florio he drove 4.9-litre Steyr VI Kausen, but retired after 3 laps because the mechanic was exhausted. He also finished 4th in the Italian Grand Prix in the Alfa Romeo P2.

In the 1925 24 Hours of Le Mans, he finished 25th, driving a 2-litre Officine Meccaniche (O.M.) Tipo 665 Superba with Vincenzo Coffani.

In the 1926 24 Hours of Le Mans, he finished 4th, driving a 2-litre O.M. Tipo 665 Superba with Giulio Foresti.

In the 1926 German Grand Prix at the Avus, he set the fastest lap of 161 km/h (100 mph) in his 1.5-litre O.M., but failed to finish. The same year, he finished 5th in a Bugatti 39A at the Grand Prix of Europe at Circuito Lasarte.

In 1927, Minoia lead an O.M. 123 at the inaugural Mille Miglia with Giuseppe Morandi, averaging 48.27 mph (77.68 km/h) for 21 hours 4 minutes 48 seconds. That year, he finished 4th at the Italian Grand Prix in an O.M. 865 and raced a Bugatti 35C at the Targa Florio.

In 1931, the A.I.A.C.R. introduced a European Championship for drivers, that was nominally contested over the three 10-hour Grands Prix, the Italian Grand Prix, French Grand Prix, and Belgian Grand Prix. He accrued sufficient points to become champion without winning a race, narrowly beating his Alfa Romeo teammate Giuseppe Campari, who had jointly won the Italian Grand Prix with Tazio Nuvolari driving the Alfa Romeo Monza. Minoia shared second place in the Italian Grand Prix and shared 6th place in the French Grand Prix driving an Alfa Romeo 8C-2300. He then finished joint 3rd in the Belgian Grand Prix having changed to the Alfa Romeo 6C-1750.

With Carlo Canavesi, he drove a 2.3-litre supercharged Alfa Romeo 8C 2300 in the 1932 24 Hours of Le Mans but failed to finish.

== Racing record ==
=== 24 Hours of Le Mans results ===
| Year | Team | Co-Drivers | Car | Class | Laps | Pos. | Class Pos. |
|---|---|---|---|---|---|---|---|
| 1925 | (Italy) Officine Meccaniche | (Italy) Vincenzo Coffani | O.M. Tipo 665 Superba | 2.0 | 81 | DNF | DNF |
| 1926 | (Italy) Officine Meccaniche | (Italy) Giulio Foresti | O.M. Tipo 665 Superba | 2.0 | 134 | 4th | **1st** |
| 1931 | (Italy) Automobili Alfa Romeo | (Italy) Giuseppe Campari | Alfa Romeo 8C 2300 LM | 3.0 | - | DNS | DNS |
| 1932 | (Italy) Automobili Alfa Romeo | (Italy) Carlo Canavesi | Alfa Romeo 8C 2300 LM | 3.0 | 22 | DNF | DNF |

=== Complete European Championship results ===
(key) (Races in bold indicate pole position) (Races in italics indicate fastest lap)

| Year | Entrant | Chassis | Engine | 1 | 2 | 3 | EDC | Pts |
|---|---|---|---|---|---|---|---|---|
| 1931 | SA Alfa Romeo | Alfa Romeo 8C-2300 | Alfa Romeo 2.3 L8 | ITA; 2 | | **BEL**; 3 | 1st | 9 |
| 1931 | SA Alfa Romeo | Alfa Romeo Monza | Alfa Romeo 2.3 L8 | | FRA; 6 | | 1st | 9 |

Sporting positions
| Preceded by None | Winner of the Mille Miglia; 1927 with: Giuseppe Morandi | Succeeded by Giuseppe Campari; Giulio Ramponi |
| Preceded by None | European Drivers' Champion; 1931 | Succeeded by Tazio Nuvolari |
