= Henri Stoffel =

French racing driver (1883–1972)

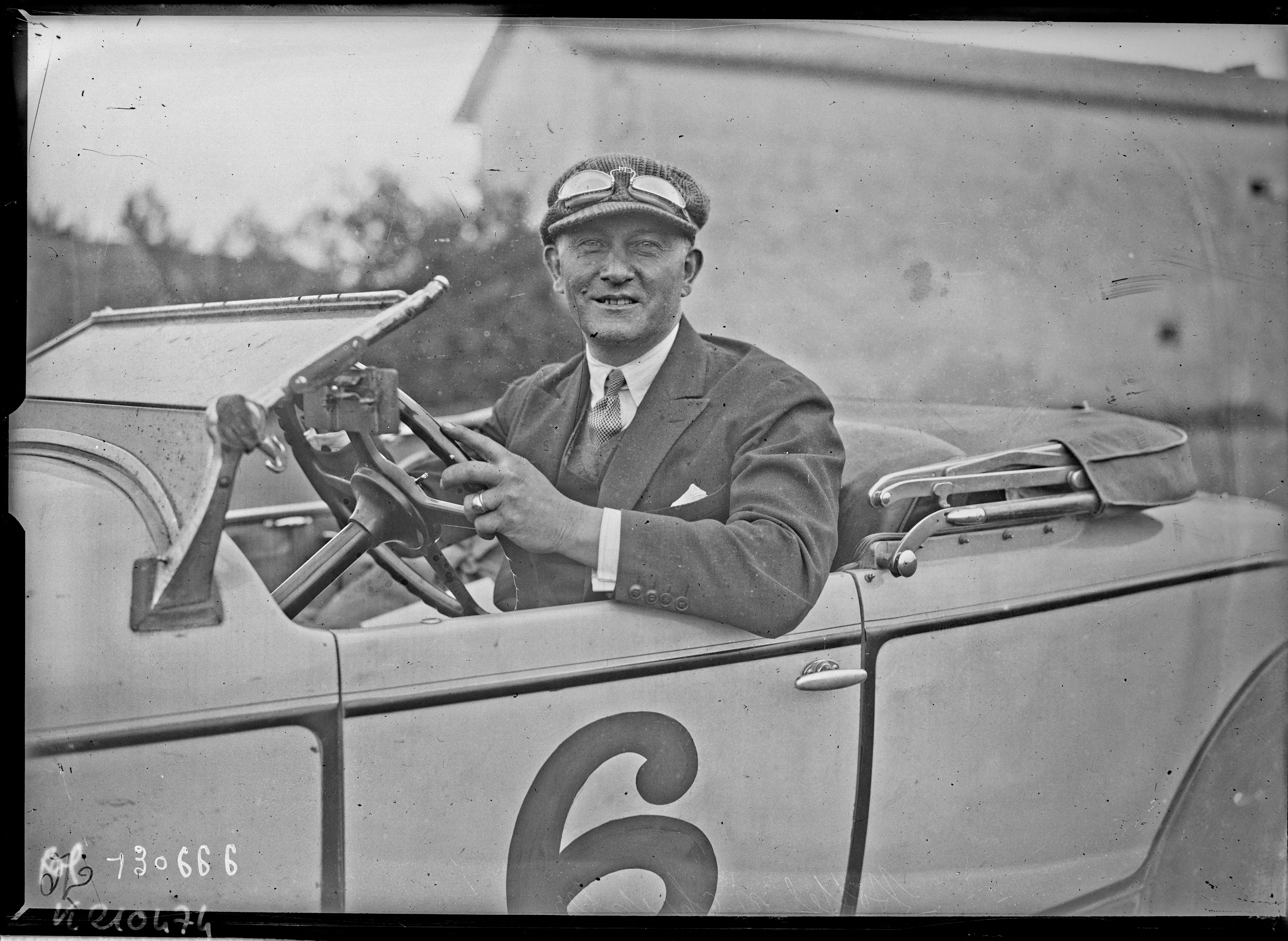
- In his Chrysler at the 1928 Grand Prix du Comminges
- Born: Henri Stoffel; 2 June 1883 Pont-d'Ain, France
- Died: 16 October 1972 (aged 89) Royan, France

24 Hours of Le Mans career
- Years: 1923–1925, 1928–1929, 1931, 1935, 1937
- Teams: Lorraine-Dietrich, Chrysler, privateer, Ecurie Bleue
- Best finish: 2nd (1924, 1931, 1935})
- Class wins: 3 (1924, 1931, 1935})

Henri Stoffel (2 June 1883 – 16 October 1972) was a French racing driver, who was three times runner-up in the 24 Hours of Le Mans.

== Career ==
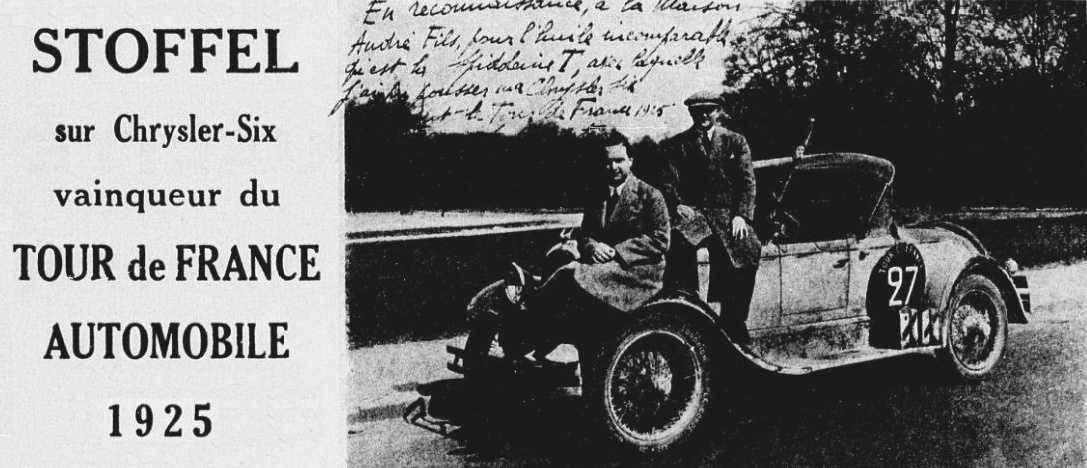
With his winning Chrysler at the 1925 Tour de France

Stoffel was originally a professional cyclist and coach with the Alcyon team, and when Alcyon started making motorcycles, Stoffel became a factory rider. His career was interrupted by the First World War, after which he ran a car dealership in Paris, concentrating on American imports.

In 1921, he started motor racing, making his debut at the Grand Prix de l'U.M.F. (Union Motocycliste Française) for cyclecars, at Le Mans, driving a Morgan; he finished in fifth place. In 1923, he took part in the first 24 Hours of Le Mans, but retired; the following year, teamed with Edouard Brisson in a Lorraine-Dietrich, he finished 2nd on distance covered. This qualified the car for the Coupe Biennale covering 1924 and 1925, but for the latter year race, Stoffel's dealership entered a Chrysler 70 - the first American car to enter the race - and although Stoffel and Lucien Desvaux finished 7th, an "off" avoiding an errant Chenard et Walcker cost the duo 7 laps, meaning they had not covered enough distance to qualify for the 1925–26 Coupe Biennale.

1925 however saw Stoffel's greatest success, as he won the Tour de France Automobile in a Chrysler Six, one of eleven entrants to avoid scoring any penalty points, but the only one in the over 3 litre class.

=== Grand Prix racing ===
As Grand Prix racing adopted a formula more akin to sportscar racing, with a new AIACR European Championship starting in 1931 in which events had to last for at least 10 hours, Stoffel became a Grand Prix driver; he had also driven in the 1928 French Grand Prix in his Chrysler, finishing 6th, although that year the event had been a pure sportscar event, and run to a handicap. Stoffel made his Grand Prix formula debut at the 1930 Belgian Grand Prix, driving a Peugeot 174S, and he ran second to Guy Bouriat as the race entered its final lap, but ran out of fuel; this allowed Bugatti to execute team orders for Louis Chiron to pass Bouriat at the last. Stoffel's best Grand Prix result was 3rd at the sportscar 1930 San Sebastián Grand Prix, also in his Peugeot, and he recorded a pair of 5th places in the 1931 Championship, at Italy and Belgium, sharing a Mercedes SSK with Boris Ivanowski; the results put the pair 11th overall (and 8th ranked team).

=== Le Mans near misses ===
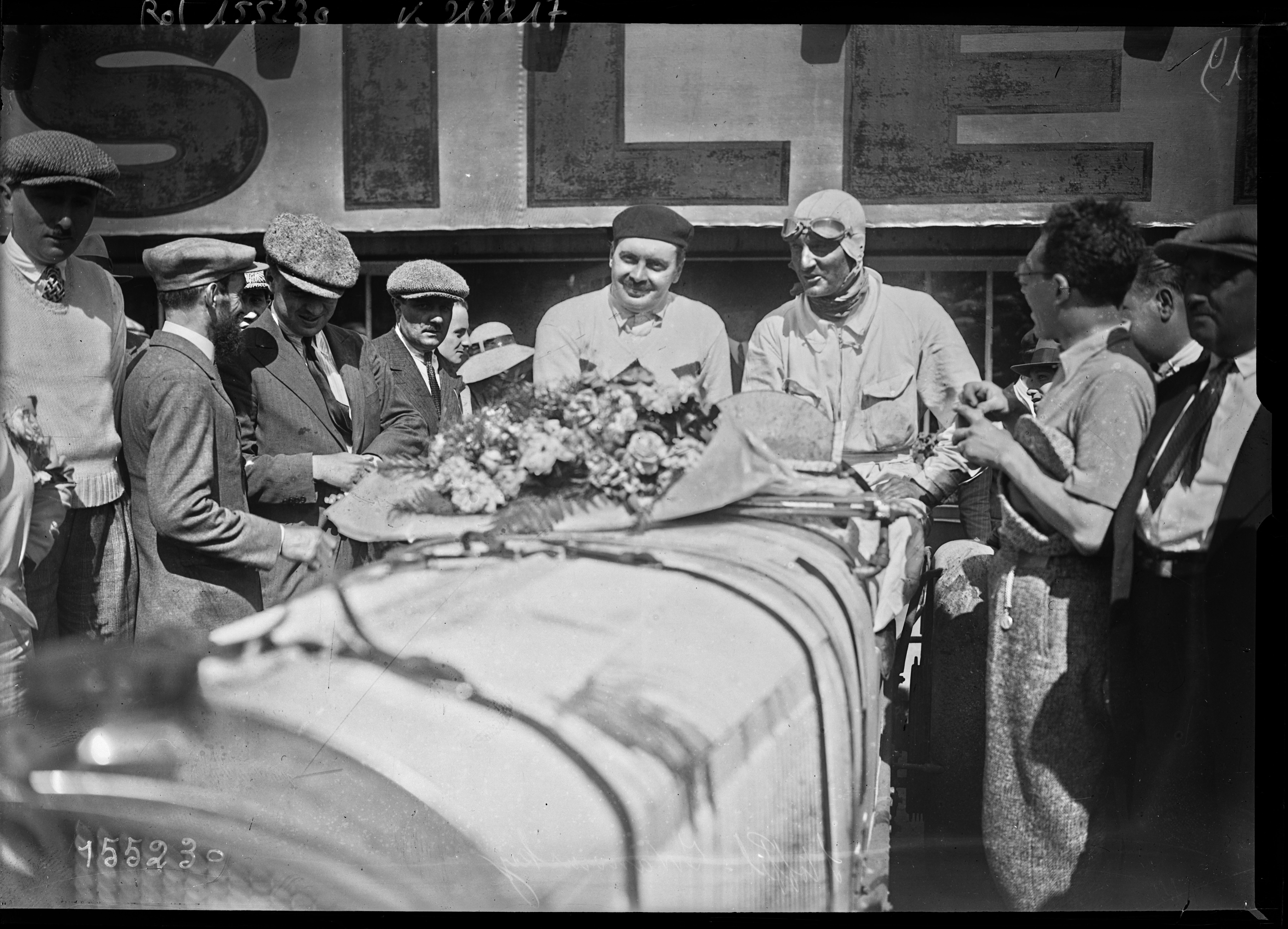
After the 1931 Le Mans 24 Hours, still wearing his linen cloth helmet, with Ivanowski (wearing beret)

Stoffel and Ivanowski finished 2nd at the 1931 24 Hours of Le Mans, still in their "Grand Prix" SSK, having shown pace early on, but at the price of having to change the car's regular Englebert tyres more often than other entrants, which dropped them eight laps off the pace. Onn the Sunday morning, Ivanowski approached Dunlop, which agreed to supply the team, and a series of fastest laps saw them gain one of the laps back by the end.

Stoffel took part in the Spa 24 Hours every year from 1928 to 1933, his best result being a runner-up finish with Raymond Sommer in an Alfa Romeo 8C 2300 in his last entry. His third runner-up finish at Le Mans came in 1935, sharing Pierre-Louis Dreyfus' Alfa Romeo 8C 2300. The pair led from 5.30am to 10am, before they lost 2 laps repairing a water leak. With 15 minutes to go, as Dreyfus passed the Lagonda of Luis Fontes on track, the public announcer claimed that Dreyfus/Stoffel had taken the lead; however Dreyfus was merely gaining a lap back, and Dreyfus/Stoffel were still half-a-lap behind at the finish. Dreyfus later sold the Alfa to Mike Hawthorn.

Stoffel's final appearance of note was finishing 3rd at the 1937 24 Hours of Le Mans with René Dreyfus in a Delahaye 135CS, entered by Ecurie Bleue; the pair lost 40 minutes in repairing the driver side door when Stoffel broke it while climbing in. He did not return to racing after the Second World War, and died in Royan on the Bay of Biscay, on 16 October 1972.

== Le Mans results ==
Year	Team	Co-Drivers	Car	Class	Laps	Pos.	Class Pos.
1923	(France) private	(France) René Labouchère	Lorraine-Dietrich B3-6	5.0	49	DNF	DNF
1924	(France) Lorraine-Dietrich	(France) Edouard Brisson	Lorraine-Dietrich B3-6	5.0	119	2nd	1st
1925	(France) Grand Garage Saint-Didier	(France) Lucien Desvaux	Chrysler 70	5.0	117	n/c	n/c
1928	Chrysler (France)	(France) André Rossignol	Chrysler 72	5.0	144	3rd	3rd
1929	Chrysler (France)	(France) Robert Benoist	Chrysler 75	5.0	152	6th	4th
1931	(Russia) Boris Ivanowski	(Russia) Boris Ivanowski	Mercedes Benz SSK	>3.0	178	2nd	1st
1935	(France) Pierre-Louis Dreyfus	(France) Pierre-Louis Dreyfus	Alfa Romeo 8C 2300 LM	4.0	222	2nd	1st
1937	(France) Ecurie Bleue	(France) René Dreyfus	Delahaye 135 CS	5.0	232	3rd	3rd

== Complete European Championship results ==
(key) (Races in bold indicate pole position)

Year	Entrant	Make	1	2	3	EDC	Points
1931	Boris Ivanowski	Mercedes SSK	ITA; 5	FRA ret	**BEL**; 5	8=	15
