= 1930 Belgian Grand Prix =

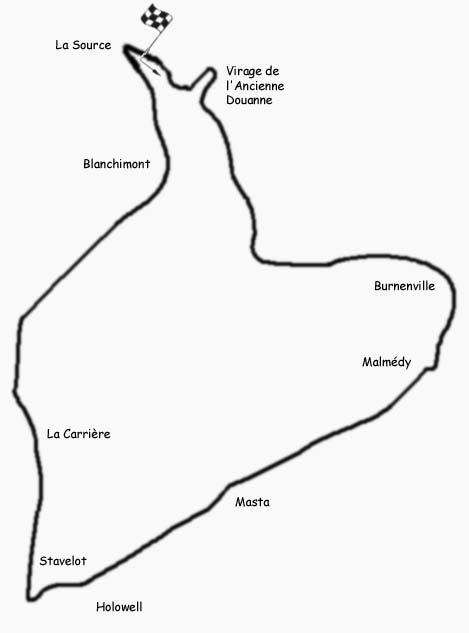

Race details
- Date: 30 July 1930
- Official name: II Grand Prix de Belgique
- Location: Spa-Francorchamps; Spa, Belgium
- Course: Road course
- Course length: 14.86 km (9.236 miles)
- Distance: 40 laps, 594.4 km (369.3 miles)

Fastest lap
Driver	(France) Guy Bouriat	Bugatti
- Time: 7:05

Podium
First	(Monaco) Louis Chiron	Bugatti
Second	(France) Guy Bouriat	Bugatti
Third	(France) Albert Divo	Bugatti

The 1930 Belgian Grand Prix (formally the II Grand Prix de Belgique), also known as the VII Grand Prix d'Europe, was a Grand Prix motor race held at Spa-Francorchamps on 20 July 1930. The race was held over 40 laps of a 14.914 km circuit for a total race distance of 596.560 km and was won by Louis Chiron driving a Bugatti; however moral victor was Guy Bouriat, who led into the 40th lap, but was forced to wait on the start/finish line by Jean Bugatti to allow Chiron to win. Henri Stoffel had been running behind Bouriat until running out of fuel on the final lap.

== Classification ==
Pos	No	Driver	Car	Laps	Time/retire	Grid
1	9	(Monaco) Louis Chiron	Bugatti T35C	40	5h08m34.6	1
2	8	(France) Guy Bouriat	Bugatti T35C	40	5h09m34	11
3	7	(France) Albert Divo	Bugatti T35C	40	5h13m54	9
4	4	(France) Arthur Duray	Ariès	40	5h22m26	8
5	1	(Italy) Goffredo Zehender	Impéria	40	5h25m19	6
6	5	(France) Charles Montier	Montier Speciale Ford	40	5h30m30	13
7	2	(France) Jérôme Ledure	Impéria	40	5h41m47	7
Ret	19	(France) Henri Stoffel	Peugeot 174S	39	Out of fuel	14
Ret	12	(Belgium) Joseph Reinartz	Bugatti T35C	39	Out of fuel	4
Ret	6	(France) Ferdinand Montier	Montier Speciale Ford	39	Out of fuel	5
Ret	18	(Belgium) Franz Gouvion	Lombard AL3	>30	Out of fuel	10
Ret	16	(France) Max Thirion	Bugatti T35	28	Did not finish	3
Ret	3	(France) Michel Doré	Impéria	28	Did not finish	2
Ret	20	(Belgium) Émil Cornet	Bugatti T35	13	Did not finish	15
Ret	17	(France) Émile Burie	Georges Irat	8	Did not finish	12
DNS	10	(France) Baron d'Orimont	Bugatti T35		Did not start	
DNS	11	(France) Ernest André	Bugatti T35		Did not start	
DNS	14	(Romania) Georges Bouriano	Bugatti T35B		Did not start	
DNS	15	(France) Mascio	Bugatti T35		Did not start	
DNS	21	(France) Delzaert	Bugatti T37A		Did not start	

Grand Prix Race
Previous race: 1930 Indianapolis 500	1930 Grand Prix season Grandes Épreuves	Next race: 1930 French Grand Prix
Previous race: 1925 Belgian Grand Prix	Belgian Grand Prix	Next race: 1931 Belgian Grand Prix
Previous race: 1928 Italian Grand Prix	European Grand Prix (Designated European Grand Prix)	Next race: 1947 Belgian Grand Prix
