= San Sebastián Grand Prix =

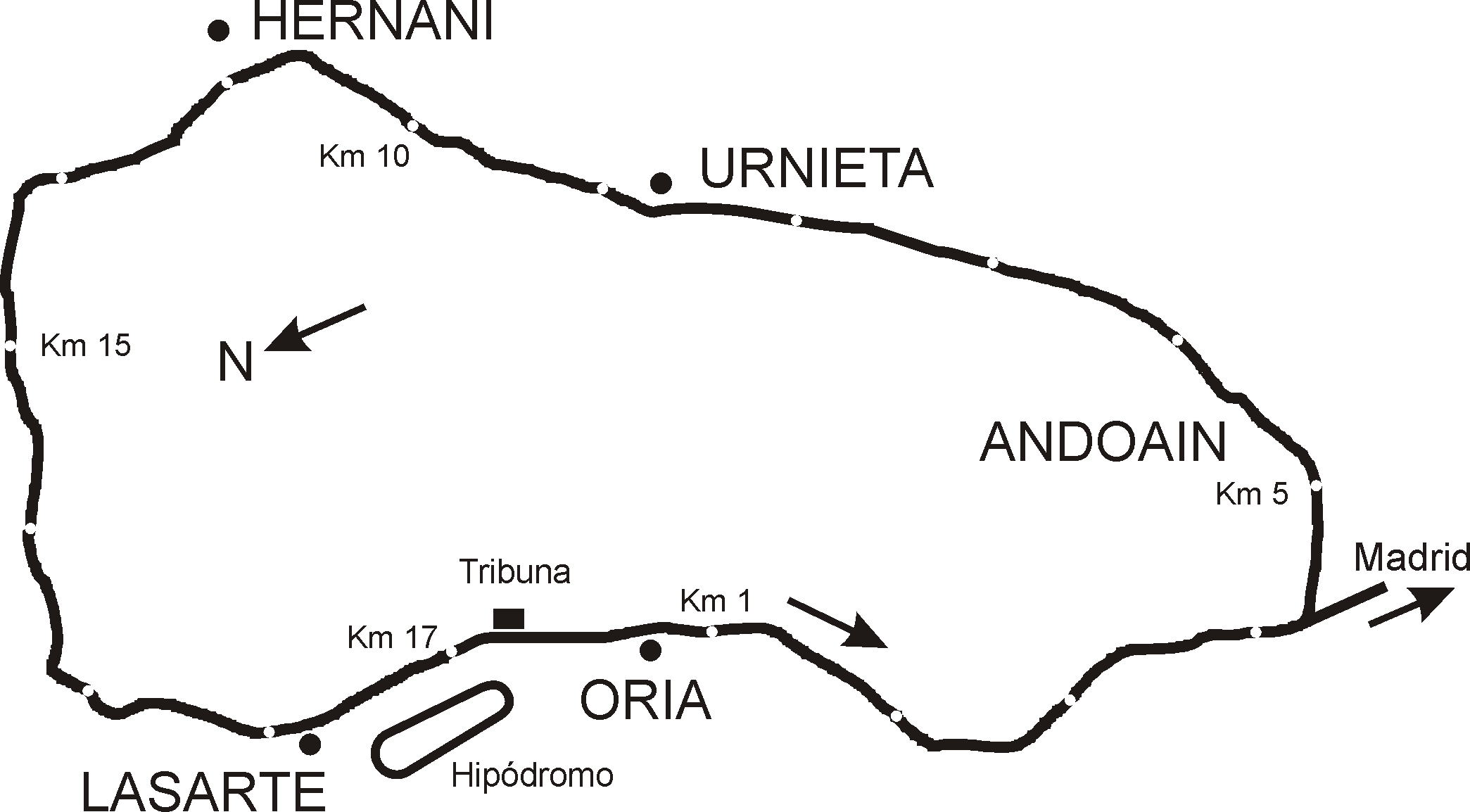
Circuito Lasarte

The San Sebastián Grand Prix (Gran Premio de San Sebastián) was an automobile race held at the Circuito Lasarte in Lasarte-Oria, Spain.

During most of its existence, it was the main race event in Spain, since the Spanish Grand Prix had not yet been properly established as a Grand Prix race. The San Sebastián Grand Prix is sometimes retroactively counted as the Spanish Grand Prix, for those years when there was no Spanish Grand Prix held.

The 1926 edition was part of the World Manufacturers' Championship.

The eighth Grand Prix of San Sebastian was scheduled for July 25, 1930 but had to be cancelled due to the bad economic situation following the Wall Street crash in October 1929. Efforts were made and AIACR granted permission to still go ahead with the race on October 5, 1930. This was to be the last San Sebastián Grand Prix. When racing returned to the Lasarte circuit in 1933 it was as the Spanish Grand Prix.

== Winners ==
These are the winners of all San Sebastián Grands Prix. For other races held at the Lasarte circuit, see the Spanish Grand Prix.

Year	Driver	Constructor	Report
1923	(France) Albert Guyot	Rolland-Pilain	Report
1924	(United Kingdom) Henry Segrave	Sunbeam	Report
1925	(France) Albert Divo (France) André Morel	Delage	Report
1926	(France) Jules Goux	Bugatti	Report *
1927	(Italy) Emilio Materassi	Bugatti	Report
1928	(Monaco) Louis Chiron	Bugatti	Report
1929	(Monaco) Louis Chiron	Bugatti	Report
1930	(Italy) Achille Varzi	Maserati	Report

* The 1926 race had the status of European Grand Prix
