= Baconin Borzacchini =

Italian racing driver (1898–1933)

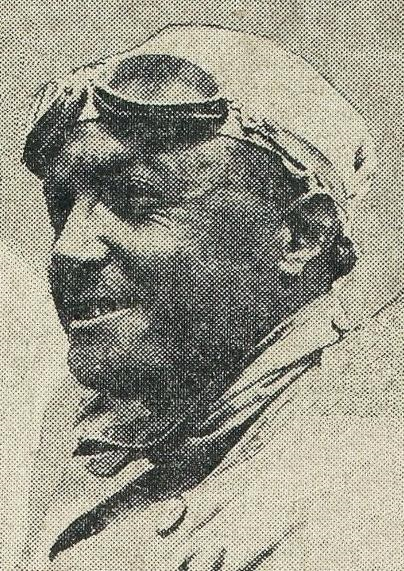
- Borzacchini in 1932
- Born: Baconino Francesco; Domenico Borzacchini; 28 September 1898 Terni, Umbria, Italy
- Died: 10 September 1933 (aged 34) Monza, Lombardy, Italy

Champ Car career
- 1 race run over 1 year
- First race: 1930 Indianapolis 500 (Indianapolis)
Wins	Podiums	Poles
0	0	0

Baconin Borzacchini (born Baconino Francesco Domenico Borzacchini, 28 September 1898 – 10 September 1933) was an Italian racing driver who often competed under the nom de course Mario Umberto Borzacchini.

== Biography ==
Born in Terni in the Umbria region of Italy, at age 14, Borzacchini began working in a garage, training as a repairman. After serving in the army artillery during World War I, he began racing motorcycles before turning to automobile competitions in 1926. During the next two years he won six Italian hillclimbing events driving a Salmson. He earned victories at three significant Italian races including the Etna Cup at Catania and the 1100cc class at the 1926 and 1927 Targa Florio where he beat fellow up-and-comer Luigi Fagioli. Borzacchini's success ultimately led to an offer to join the Maserati racing team and driving for them, he won the 1927 Terni-Passo della Somma and the Coppa della Collina Pistoiese." In 1928 he drove a Maserati to first place in the Coppa Gallenga hillclimb at Rocca di Papa.

On 28 September 1929, Borzacchini set a new flying 10-kilometre (6.2 mi) land speed record of 246.069 km/h (152.900 mph) in a Maserati V4. That same year, he finished second in the Circuito di Alessandria and in the Tripoli Grand Prix.

In 1930, under the fascist government of Benito Mussolini, Borzacchini was pressured into racing under the Italian name, Mario Umberto, rather than his birth name of Baconin, which was based on that of Russian revolutionary anarchist, Mikhail Bakunin, who his parents had admired.

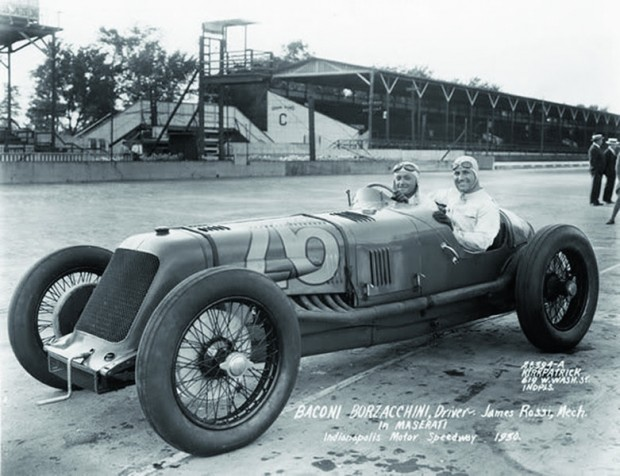
Maserati Tipo V4 driven by Borzacchini in the 1930 Indianapolis 500

Maserati entered the 1930 Indianapolis 500. Designed with a swept-back aerodynamic front end, a radical innovation uncommon at the time but commonplace today, some felt that Borzacchini had a good chance to capture the prestigious American event. Unfortunately, magneto problems forced him out of the race after just seven laps. Later that year, Borzacchini and his Maserati claimed victory at the 1930 Tripoli Grand Prix and won another hillclimbing event, the Pontedecimo-Giovi at Genoa.

In 1931, Borzacchini signed to drive Alfa Romeos for Scuderia Ferrari where he became a great friend of team-mate Tazio Nuvolari. Although he won the Circuito di Avellino, Borzacchini's season was dogged by both bad luck and the brilliance of Nuvolari. He finished second at the Targa Florio, the Grand Prix of Monza, and the Italian, Belgian and French Grands Prix.

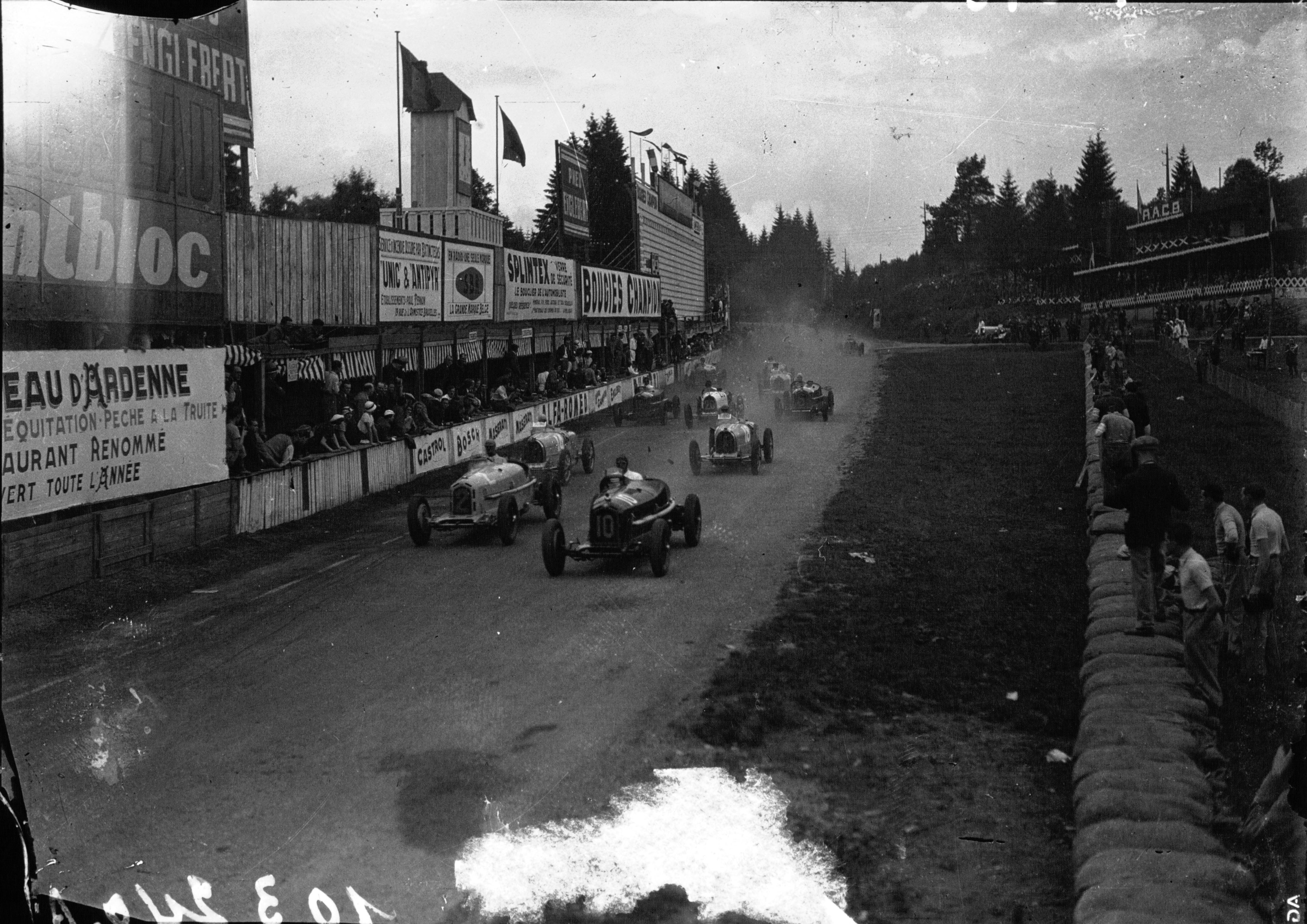
Borzacchini (nr 10) front right in the 1933 Belgian Grand Prix with Alfa Romeo Monza 2.6 entered by Scuderia Ferrari

At the 1932 French Grand Prix and the Coppa Ciano, driving the new Alfa Romeo P3, Borzacchini finished second behind team mate Nuvolari and third at Germany's Großer Preis von Deutschland. However, with co-driver Amadeo Bignami, he won the gruelling Mille Miglia and wound up the 1932 season finishing second overall to Nuvolari for the European Drivers Championship. When Alfa Romeo decided to withdraw from racing after the 1932 season and sold its cars to Enzo Ferrari, Borzacchini rejoined the Maserati team, uniting with Luigi Fagioli and Giuseppe Campari. In March 1933, Borzacchini picked up where he had left off the previous year, finishing second to Nuvolari at the Grand Prix of Tunisia. In April he took another second at the Monaco Grand Prix, this time to the Bugatti of Achille Varzi, and then earned a third-place finish at the Avusrennen in Germany, also won by Varzi. At the 1933 Targa Florio, held at the Circuito Piccolo delle Madonie, Borzacchini set the pace with the fastest lap before an accident forced him out of the race.

== Death ==
10 September 1933 at the Autodromo Nazionale Monza was one of the blackest days in racing history. The Italian Grand Prix was held in the morning without serious incident, and was won by Luigi Fagioli. In an effort by the organizers to attract the largest possible crowd, another event called the Monza Grand Prix, using only the banked oval circuit, was staged in the afternoon. On a track dampened by a light drizzle, Borzacchini was vying with his team-mate Giuseppe Campari for the lead when Campari's vehicle slid on a patch of oil and crashed over the top of the banking and went into the trees, killing him. Borzacchini tried unsuccessfully to avoid the oil, and his car spun down to the infield and rolled over. Borzacchini was taken to the hospital, where he died later that day. After race officials restarted the event the third tragedy of the day occurred when the car of Polish driver Count Stanislas Czaykowski blew the engine, caught fire and crashed at the same location, burning him to death.

During his years of racing, Borzacchini participated in more than one hundred events. Although his number of victories is considerably less than some of the other Italian racing notables, he was much loved and respected by his countrymen. In his honor, the circuit in Magione in the Province of Perugia in Umbria, not far from where he was born, was named the "Autodromo Mario Umberto Borzacchini".

Borzacchini is interred in the local cemetery in his native Terni.

== Motorsports career results ==
=== Major career victories ===
- Camaiore Circuit 1926
- Targa Florio (Junior class, 1100cc) 1926, 1927
- Etna Cup 1928
- Tripoli Grand Prix 1930
- Coppa Principe di Piemonte 1931
- Mille Miglia 1932

=== Indianapolis 500 results ===
Year	Car	Start	Qual	Rank	Finish	Laps	Led	Retired
1930	26	28	95.213	27	36	7	0	Magneto
**Totals**						7	0	

Starts	1
Poles	0
Front Row	0
Wins	0
Top 5	0
Top 10	0
Retired	1

=== Complete European Championship results ===
(key) (Races in bold indicate pole position) (Races in italics indicate fastest lap)

Year	Entrant	Chassis	Engine	1	2	3	EDC	Pts
1931	SA Alfa Romeo	Alfa Romeo Type A	Alfa Romeo 2x 3.5 L6	ITA; Ret			—^{1}	
1931	SA Alfa Romeo	Alfa Romeo Monza	Alfa Romeo 2.3 L8		FRA; 2		—^{1}	
1931	SA Alfa Romeo	Alfa Romeo 8C-2300	Alfa Romeo 2.3 L8			BEL; 2	—^{1}	
1932	SA Alfa Romeo	Alfa Romeo Monza	Alfa Romeo 2.3 L8	**ITA**; 3			2nd	8
1932	SA Alfa Romeo	Alfa Romeo Tipo B/P3	Alfa Romeo 2.6 L8		FRA; 2	GER; 3	2nd	8

Notes

- **^1** – Borzacchini was co-driver with Nuvolari at the Italian GP, Campari at the French GP and Nuvolari at the Belgian GP, therefore rules excluded him from the championship.
