= Max Fourny =

French publisher, art collector and motor racing driver (1904-1991)

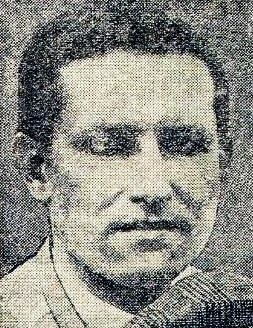

Max Fourny (4 August 1904 – 9 March 1991) was a French publisher, art collector and former motor racing driver. He founded the Musée d'Art Naïf – Max Fourny in Paris, which houses an important collection of naïve paintings and sculptures from around the world. His art collection was later distributed between the museum in Paris and the International Museum of Naive Art at Vicq, near Versailles, (Fourny's former home). Fourny was married to the painter Françoise Adnet.

== Complete European Championship results ==
(key) (Races in bold indicate pole position)

Year	Entrant	Make	1	2	3	EDC	Points
1931	Private entry	Bugatti	ITA	FRA; Ret	BEL	34=	21
1932	Private entry	Bugatti	ITA	FRA; Ret	GER	16=	21
