= Circuito Lasarte =

Race track at Lasarte-Oria, Guipúzcoa, Spain

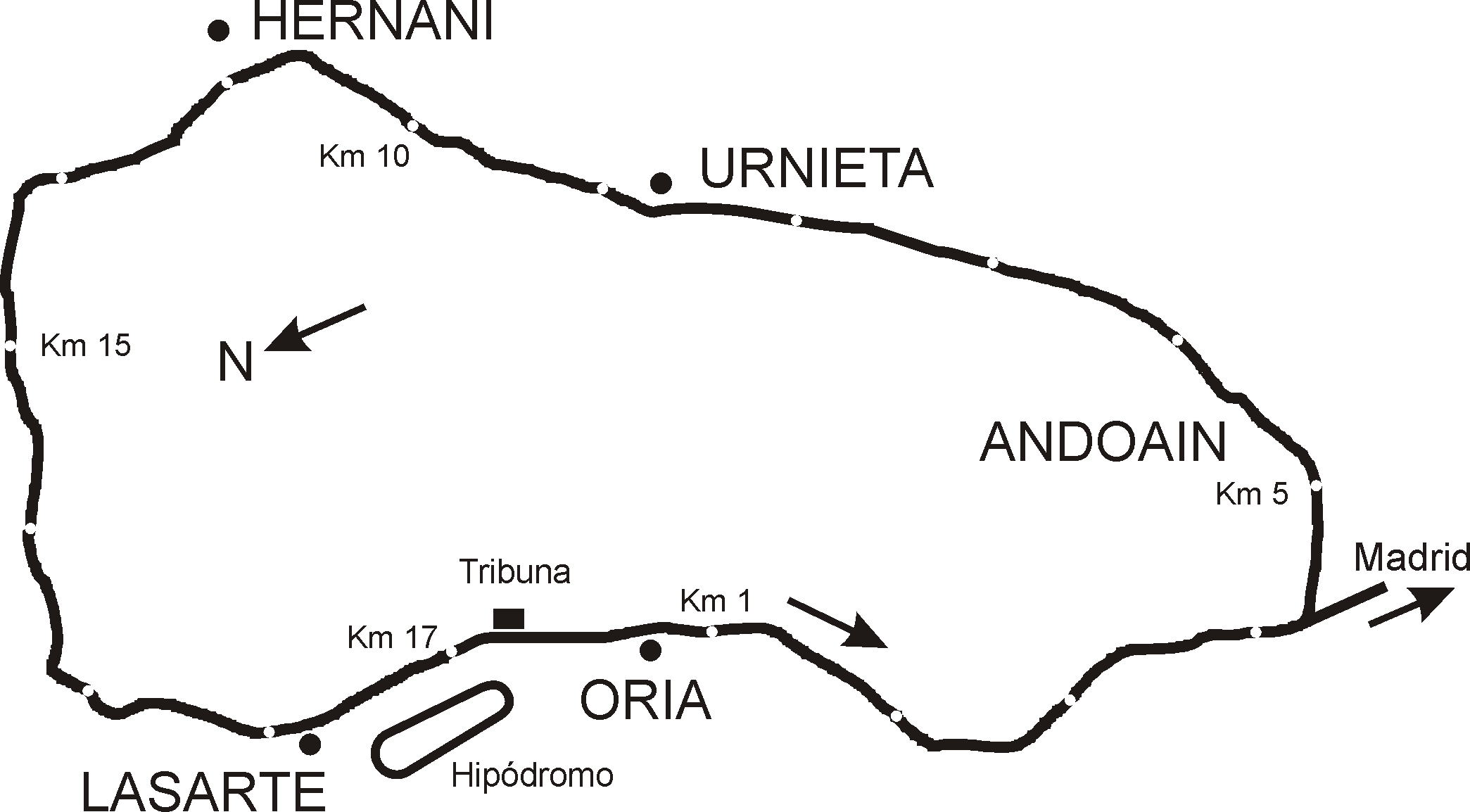
- Grand Prix Circuit (1923–1935)
- Location: Lasarte-Oria, Gipuzkoa, Spain
- Coordinates: 43°15′23″N 2°1′7″W
- Opened: 1923
- Closed: 1935
- Major events: Spanish Grand Prix (1926–1929, 1933–1935); San Sebastian Grand Prix (1923–1930)

Grand Prix Circuit (1923–1935)
- Length: 17.749 km (11.029 miles)
- Race lap record: 5:58:00 ( (Italy) Achille Varzi, Auto Union B, 1935, GP)

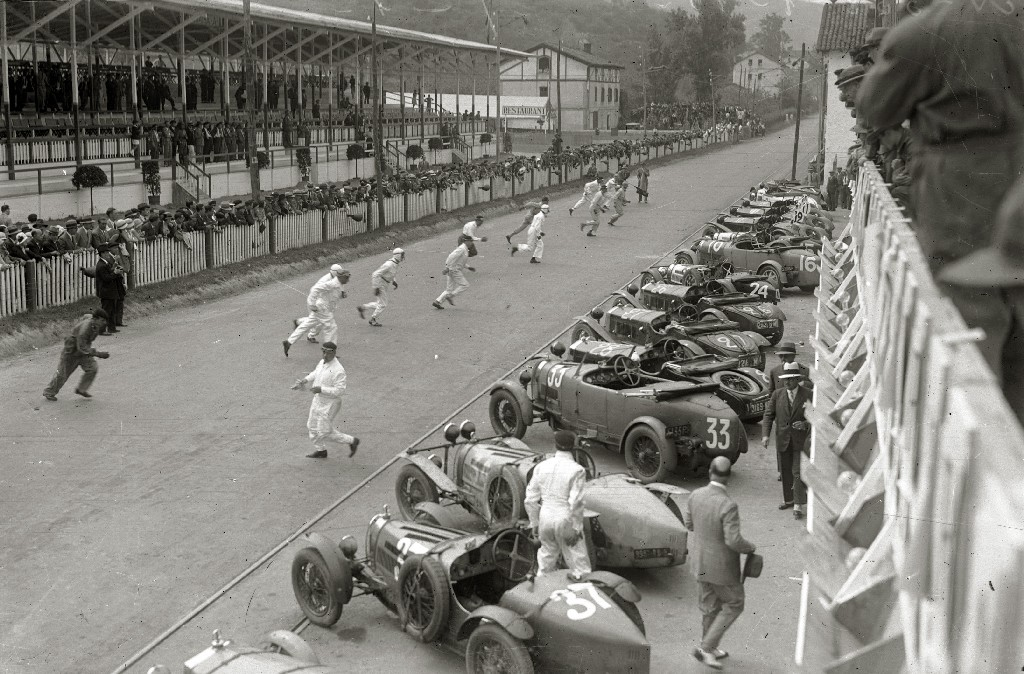
Start of Spanish Grand Prix 1929

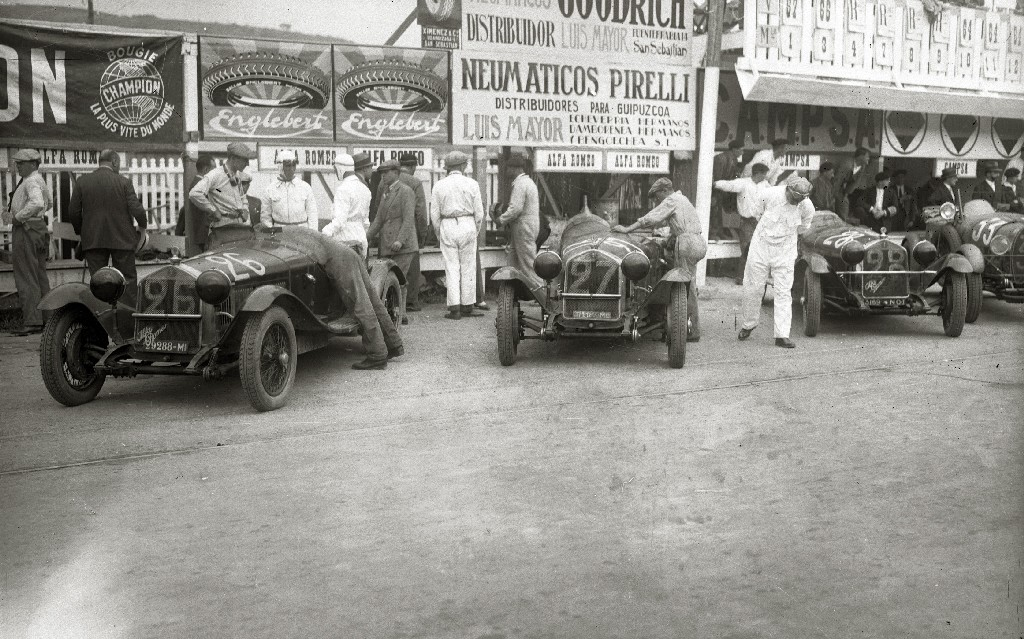
Alfa Romeo team before the start, Lasarte GP Guipúzcoa / GP Spain 1929-07-28

The Circuito Lasarte was an 17.749 km (11.029 mi) Grand Prix motor racing road course at Lasarte-Oria, Gipuzkoa, Spain in the Basque Country near the city of San Sebastián on the Bay of Biscay. The counterclockwise layout was used between 1923 and 1935 but racing ended with the eruption of the Spanish Civil War in 1936 and after the war auto racing resumed at new tracks near Barcelona.

The Circuito Lasarte played host to the San Sebastian Grand Prix, Spanish Grand Prix and the 1926 European Grand Prix. No longer operational for auto racing, in 1965 the layout was used for the World Cycling Championship.

== Grand Prix results ==
=== San Sebastian Grand Prix ===
1923 Albert Guyot driving a Rolland-Pilain
1924 Henry Segrave driving a Sunbeam
1925 Albert Divo/André Morel driving a Delage 2LCV

=== European Grand Prix ===
1926 Jules Goux driving a Bugatti T39A

=== Spanish Grand Prix ===
1926 Bartolomeo Costantini driving a Bugatti T35
1927 Robert Benoist driving a Delage 15-S8

=== San Sebastian Grand Prix ===
1927 Emilio Materassi driving a Bugatti T35C
1928 Louis Chiron driving a Bugatti T35C
1929 Louis Chiron driving a Bugatti T35B
1930 Achille Varzi driving a Maserati 26M

=== Spanish Grand Prix ===
1933 Louis Chiron driving an Alfa Romeo Type B/P3
1934 Luigi Fagioli driving a Mercedes-Benz W25/34
1935 Rudolf Caracciola driving a Mercedes-Benz W25/35
