= 1931 Belgian Grand Prix =

- Race 3 of 3 in the 1931 European Championship
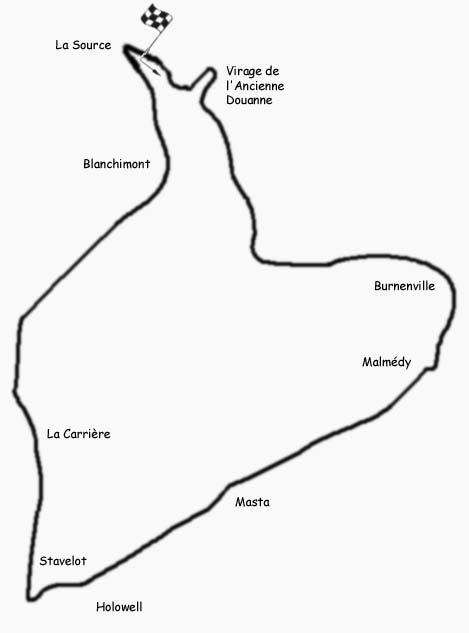

Race details
- Date: 12 July 1931
- Official name: III Grand Prix de Belgique
- Location: Spa-Francorchamps; Spa, Belgium
- Course: Permanent racing facility
- Course length: 14.864 km (9.236 miles)
- Distance: 88 laps, 1320.399 km (820.458 miles)

Pole position
Drivers	(Italy) Ferdinando Minoia; (Italy) Giovanni Minozzi	Alfa Romeo
- Grid positions set by ballot

Fastest lap
Driver	(Monaco) Louis Chiron	Bugatti
- Time: 6:18.6

Podium
First	(United Kingdom) William Grover-Williams; (Italy) Caberto Conelli	Bugatti
Second	(Italy) Tazio Nuvolari; (Italy) Baconin Borzacchini	Alfa Romeo
Third	(Italy) Ferdinando Minoia; (Italy) Giovanni Minozzi	Alfa Romeo

The 1931 Belgian Grand Prix was a Grand Prix motor race held at Spa-Francorchamps on 12 July 1931.

== Classification ==
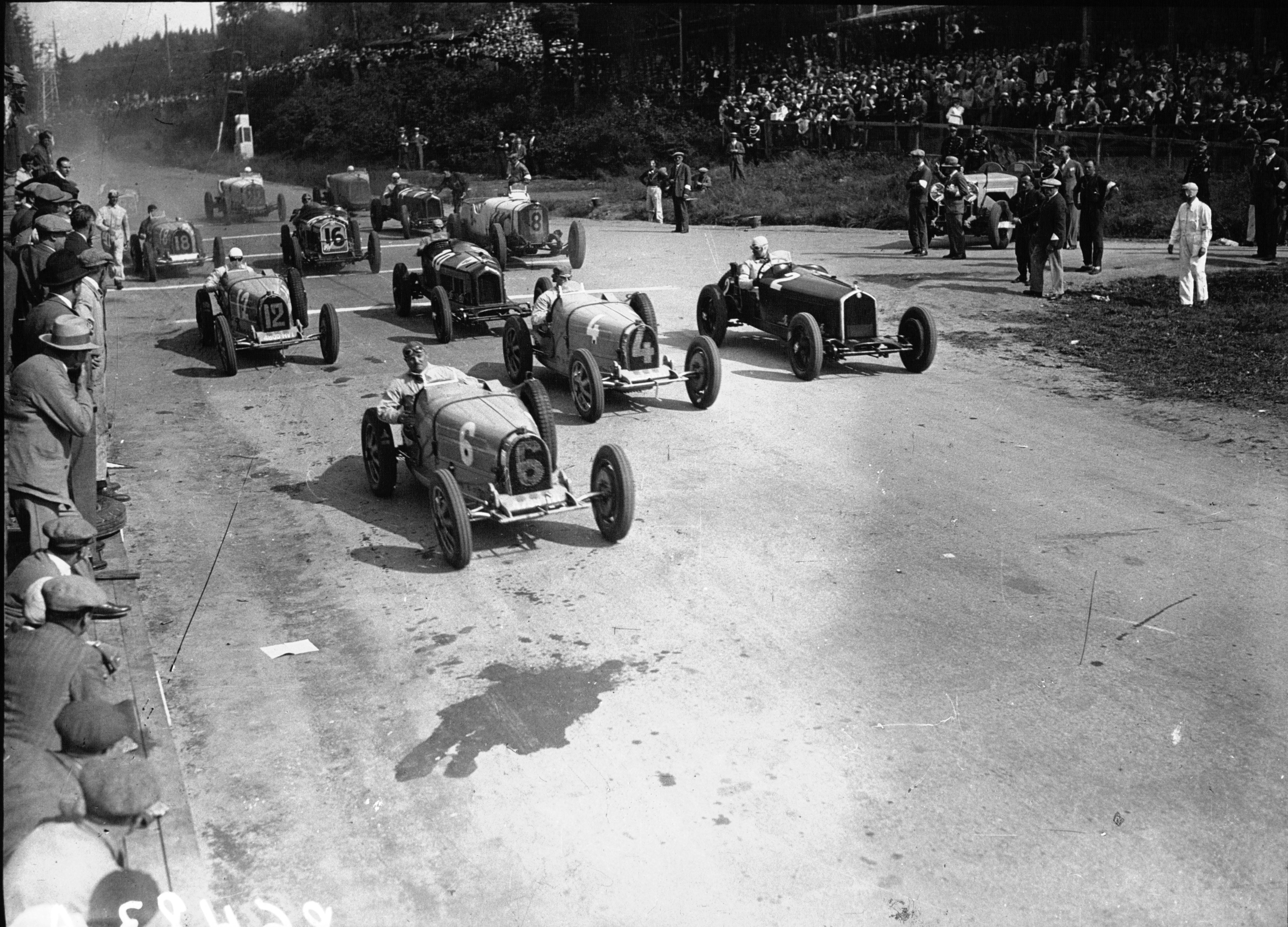
Start of the race

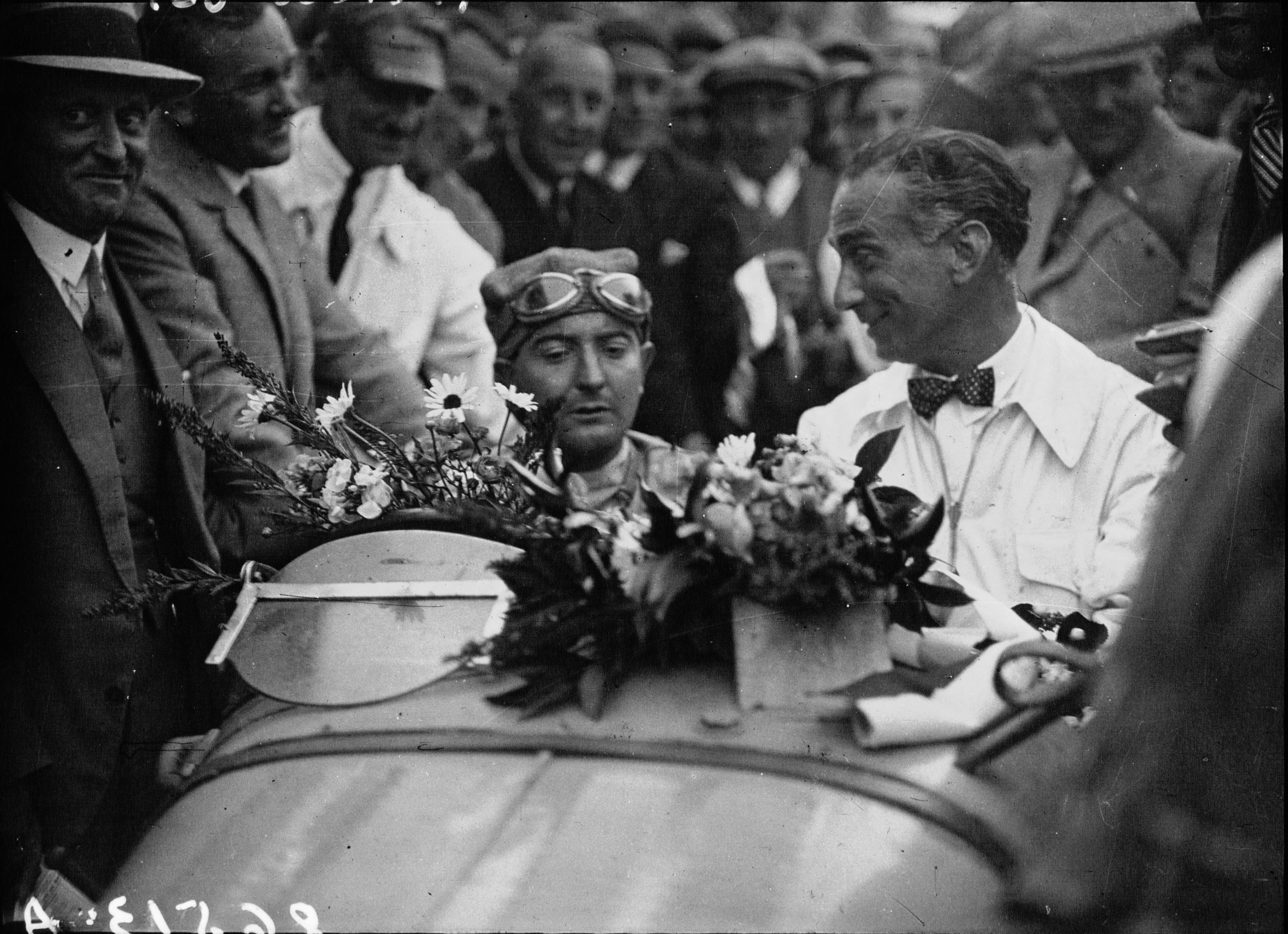
Winner William Grover-Williams

=== Race ===
Pos	No	Driver	Team	Car	Laps	Time/Retired	Grid	Points
1	4	(United Kingdom) William Grover-Williams	Private entry	Bugatti T51	88		2	1
1	4	(Italy) Caberto Conelli	Private entry	Bugatti T51	88		2	1
2	10	(Italy) Tazio Nuvolari	Alfa Corse	Alfa Romeo 8C-2300	88		5	2
2	10	(Italy) Baconin Borzacchini	Alfa Corse	Alfa Romeo 8C-2300	88		5	2
3	2	(Italy) Ferdinando Minoia	Alfa Corse	Alfa Romeo 8C-2300	85	+3 Laps	1	3
3	2	(Italy) Giovanni Minozzi	Alfa Corse	Alfa Romeo 8C-2300	85	+3 Laps	1	3
4	16	(United Kingdom) Henry Birkin	Alfa Corse	Alfa Romeo 8C-2300LM	83	+5 Laps	8	4
4	16	(United Kingdom) Brian Lewis	Alfa Corse	Alfa Romeo 8C-2300LM	83	+5 Laps	8	4
5	8	(France) Henri Stoffel	Private entry	Mercedes-Benz SSK	81	+7 Laps	4	4
5	8	(Russia) Boris Ivanowski (Note: Ivanowski was a Russian national, but in exile since the Russian Revolution.)	Private entry	Mercedes-Benz SSK	81	+7 Laps	4	4
6	24	(France) Jean Pesato	Private entry	Alfa Romeo 6C-1750	73	+15 Laps	12	4
6	24	(France) Pierre Félix	Private entry	Alfa Romeo 6C-1750	73	+15 Laps	12	4
Ret	18	(France) Jean-Pierre Wimille	Private entry	Bugatti T51	65	+23 Laps	9	5
Ret	18	(France) Jean Gaupillat	Private entry	Bugatti T51	65	+23 Laps	9	5
8 (Note: Researcher Hans Etzrodt has Montier placed 7th.)	22	(France) Charles Montier	Private entry	Montier-Ford	58	+30 Laps	11	5
8	22	(France) "Ducolombier"	Private entry	Montier-Ford	58	+30 Laps	11	5
Ret	20	(France) Ferdinand Montier	Private entry	Montier-Ford	56		10	5
Ret	6	(France) Albert Divo	Bugatti	Bugatti T51	51	Mechanical	3	5
Ret	6	(France) Guy Bouriat	Bugatti	Bugatti T51	51	Mechanical	3	5
Ret	12	(Italy) Achille Varzi	Bugatti	Bugatti T51	44	Magneto	6	6
Ret	12	(Monaco) Louis Chiron	Bugatti	Bugatti T51	44	Magneto	6	6
Ret	14	(Italy) Giuseppe Campari	Alfa Corse	Alfa Romeo 8C-2300	40	Fire	7	6
Ret	14	(Italy) Goffredo Zehender	Alfa Corse	Alfa Romeo 8C-2300	40	Fire	7	6

=== Starting grid positions ===
1st Row	1 Pos.	2 Pos.	3 Pos.
	(Italy) / (Italy); Minoia / Minozzi; Alfa Romeo	(United Kingdom) / (Italy); Grover-Williams / Conelli; Bugatti	(France) / (France); Divo / Bouriat; Bugatti
2nd Row	1 Pos.	2 Pos.	3 Pos.
	(France) / Stoffel / (Russia) Ivanowski; Mercedes-Benz	(Italy) / (Italy); Nuvolari / Borzacchini; Alfa Romeo	(Italy) / (Monaco); Varzi / Chiron; Bugatti
3rd Row	1 Pos.	2 Pos.	3 Pos.
	(Italy) / (Italy); Campari / Zehender; Alfa Romeo	(United Kingdom) / (United Kingdom); Birkin / Lewis; Alfa Romeo	(France) / (France); Wimille / Gaupillat; Bugatti
4th Row	1 Pos.	2 Pos.	3 Pos.
	(France); F. Montier; Montier-Ford	(France) / (France); C. Montier / Ducolombier; Montier-Ford	(France) / (France); Pesato / Félix; Alfa Romeo

== Notes ==
Grand Prix Race
Previous race: 1931 French Grand Prix	1931 Grand Prix season Grandes Épreuves	Next race: 1931 German Grand Prix
Previous race: 1930 Belgian Grand Prix	Belgian Grand Prix	Next race: 1933 Belgian Grand Prix
