= Albert Divo =

French racing driver (1895–1966)

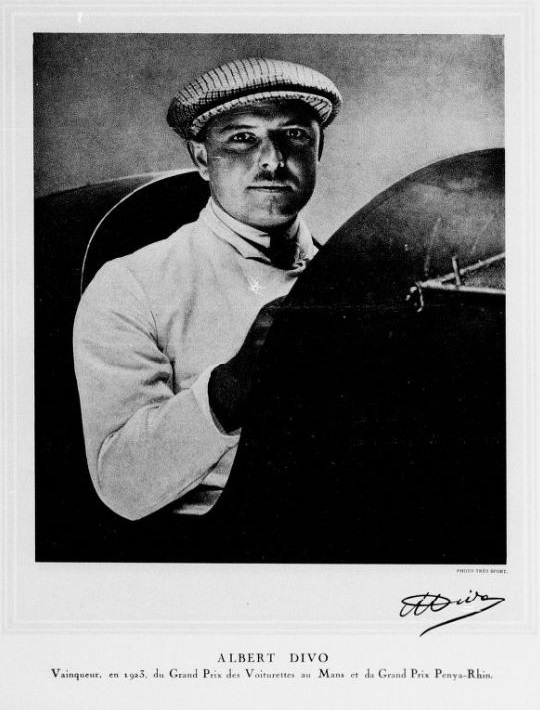
Albert Divo, 1924

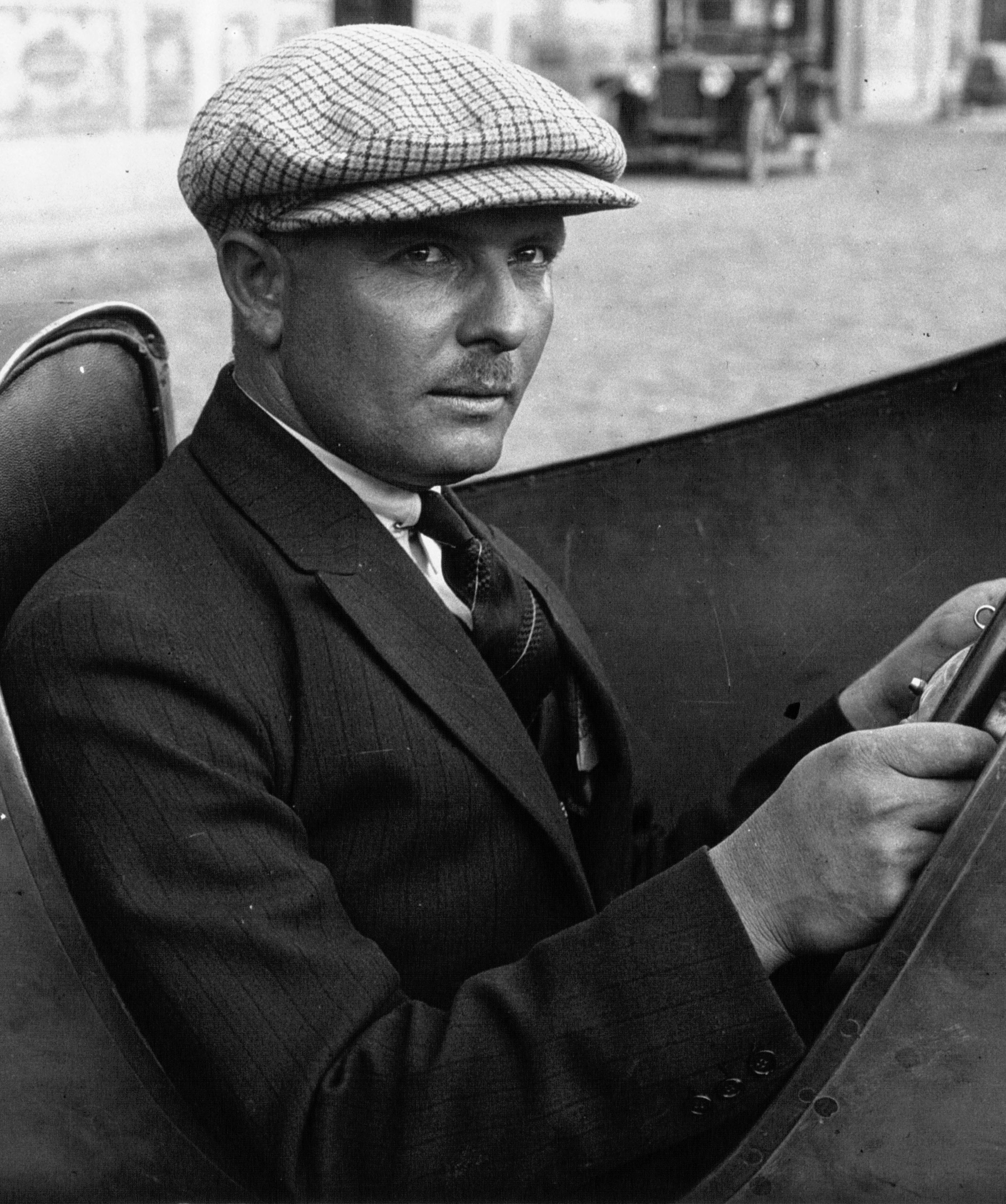
Albert Divo at the 1924 French Grand Prix

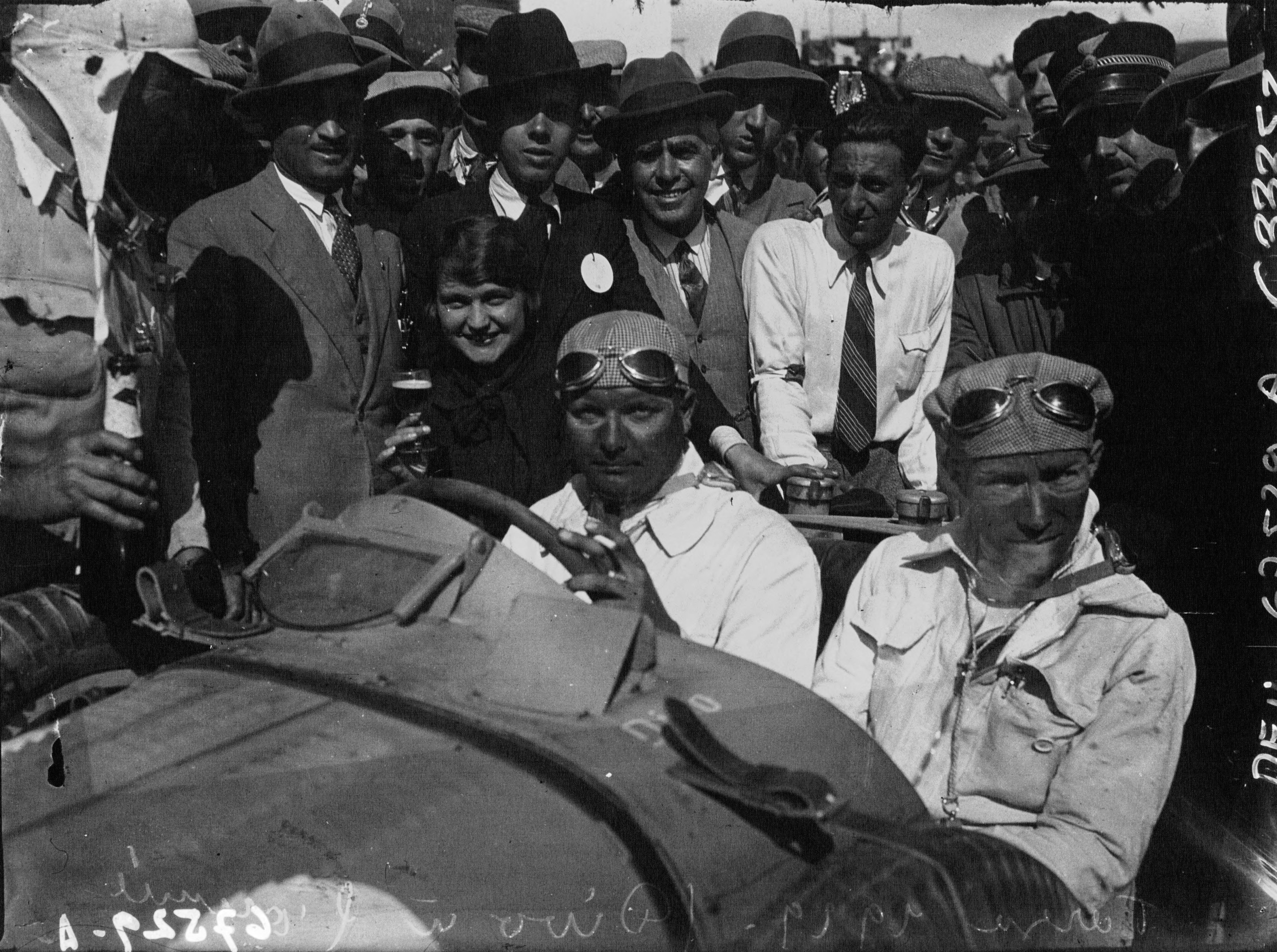
Albert Divo at the 1929 Targa Florio Bugatti Type 35C

Albert Divo (24 January 1895, in Paris – 19 September 1966, in Morsang-sur-Orge, Essonne, France) was a Grand Prix motor racing driver. He was born in Paris, France. In 1922, Divo competed in the International Tourist Trophy endurance race on the Isle of Man. He scored his first major victory driving for Sunbeam at the 1923 Spanish Grand Prix at the Sitges Terramar circuit about 40 km outside Barcelona.

Driving for Delage, in 1924 he finished second behind Giuseppe Campari in the European Grand Prix at Lyon. The following year he won two major Grand Prix events for Delage. In July he captured the French Grand Prix at the Autodrome de Montlhéry after his car went out of the race and he took over from teammate Robert Benoist. In September he shared victory with teammate André Morel at the San Sebastián Grand Prix at Circuito Lasarte. In 1927 he finished third in the British Grand Prix at Brooklands. The next year, he drove a Bugatti Type 35 to victories in the 1928 and 1929 Targa Florio.

Albert Divo was a founding member of the Club International des Anciens Pilotes de Grand Prix F1 in 1962 in Villars-sur-Ollon, Switzerland. He died in 1966 and was buried in the Morsang-sur-Orge cemetery in the department of the Essonne near Paris. As an honour the Bugatti Divo is named after him.

== Major race wins ==
- 1923 - Spanish Grand Prix (Sunbeam)
- 1925 - San Sebastián Grand Prix, French Grand Prix (Delage)
- 1926 - GP du Salon (Talbot)
- 1927 - ACF Libre (Talbot)
- 1928 - Targa Florio
- 1929 - Targa Florio

== Complete European Championship results ==
(key) (Races in bold indicate pole position)

Year	Entrant	Make	1	2	3	EDC	Points
1931	Usines Bugatti	Bugatti	ITA; 3	FRA; 7	**BEL**; Ret	4=	12
1932	Ettore Bugatti	Bugatti	ITA; 6	FRA; Ret	GER	5=	17
