= 1931 French Grand Prix =

- Race 2 of 3 in the 1931 European Championship

Race details
- Date: 21 June 1931
- Official name: XXV Grand Prix de l'Automobile Club de France
- Location: Autodrome de Linas-Montlhéry; Montlhéry, France
- Course: Permanent racing facility
- Course length: 12.505 km (7.770 miles)
- Distance: 101 laps, 1286.825 km (799.596 miles)

Pole position
Drivers	(United Kingdom) William "Bummer" Scott; (United Kingdom) S. Armstrong-Payne	Delage
- Grid positions set by ballot

Fastest lap
Driver	(Italy) Luigi Fagioli	Maserati
- Time: 5:29

Podium
First	(Monaco) Louis Chiron; (Italy) Achille Varzi	Bugatti
Second	(Italy) Giuseppe Campari; (Italy) Baconin Borzacchini	Alfa Romeo
Third	(Italy) Clemente Biondetti; (Italy) Luigi Parenti	Maserati

The 1931 French Grand Prix (formally the XXV Grand Prix de l'A.C.F.) was a Grand Prix motor race held at Autodrome de Linas-Montlhéry on 21 June 1931. As with the other two races in the 1931 AIACR European Championship, this race was held over 10 hours, not over a fixed distance. As a result, most cars had two drivers.

The race was won by Louis Chiron and Achille Varzi driving a factory entered Bugatti T51, who after early race battles lead more than eight hours of the race

== Classification ==
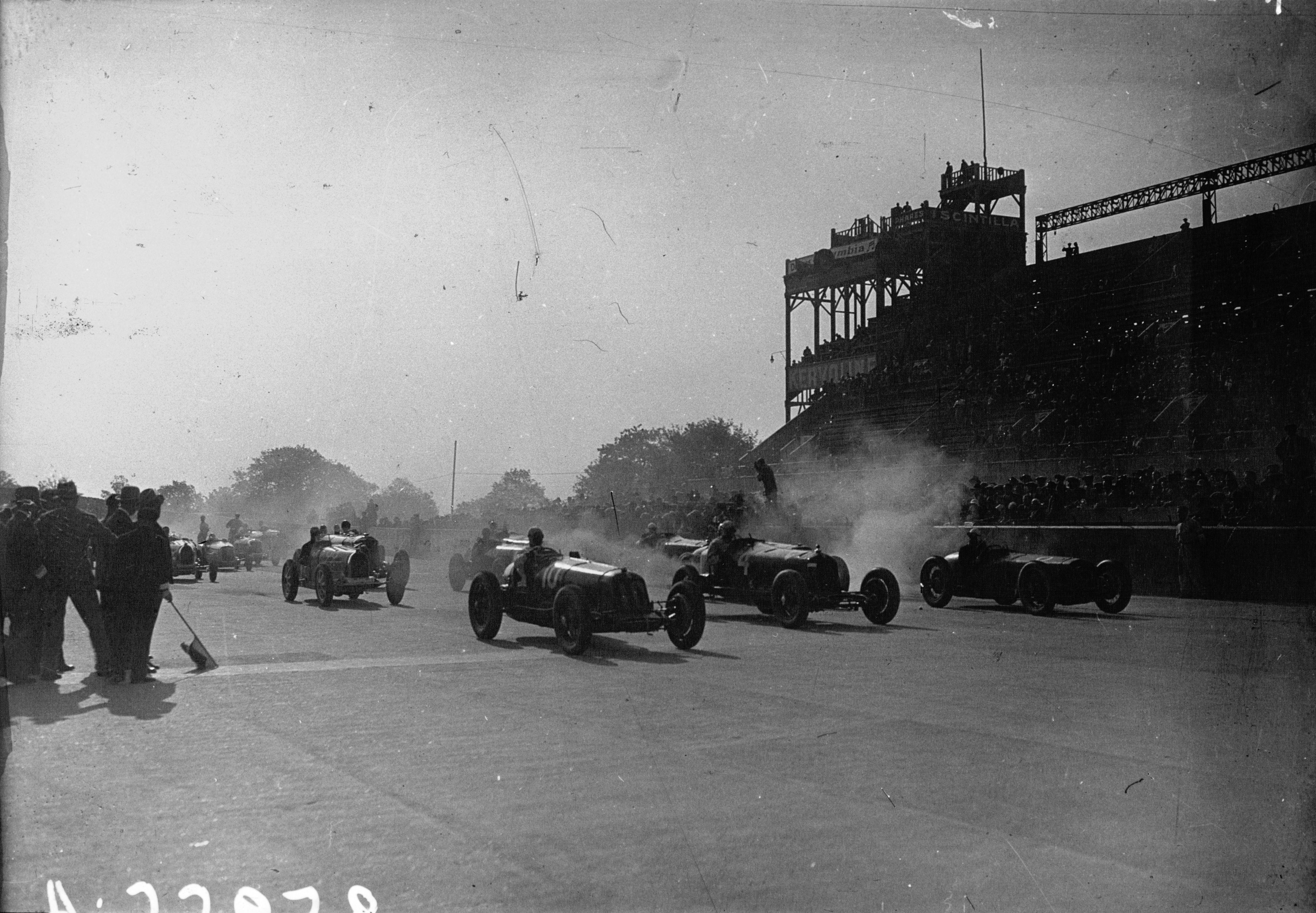
Start of the race

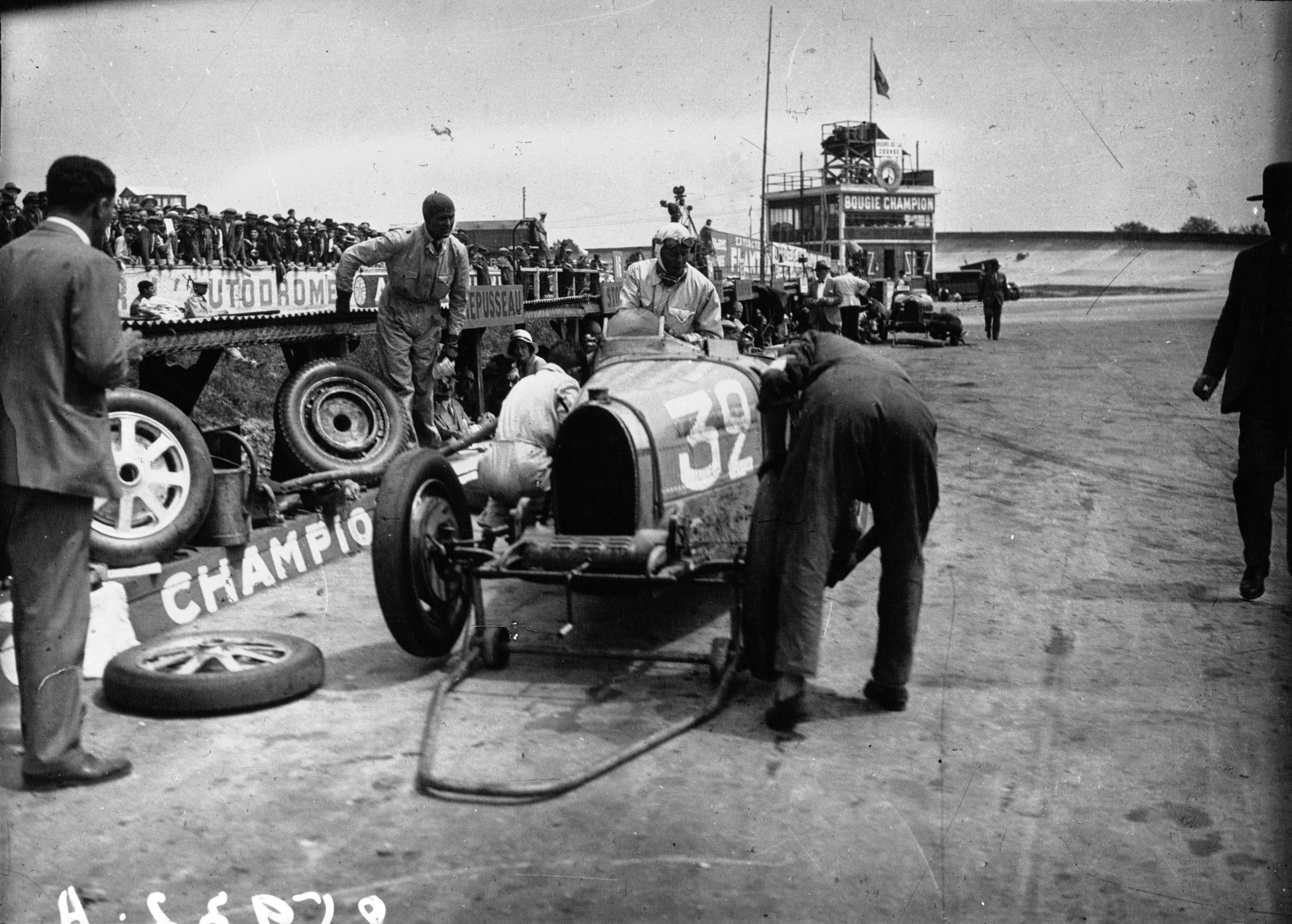
Louis Chiron and Achille Varzi pitting

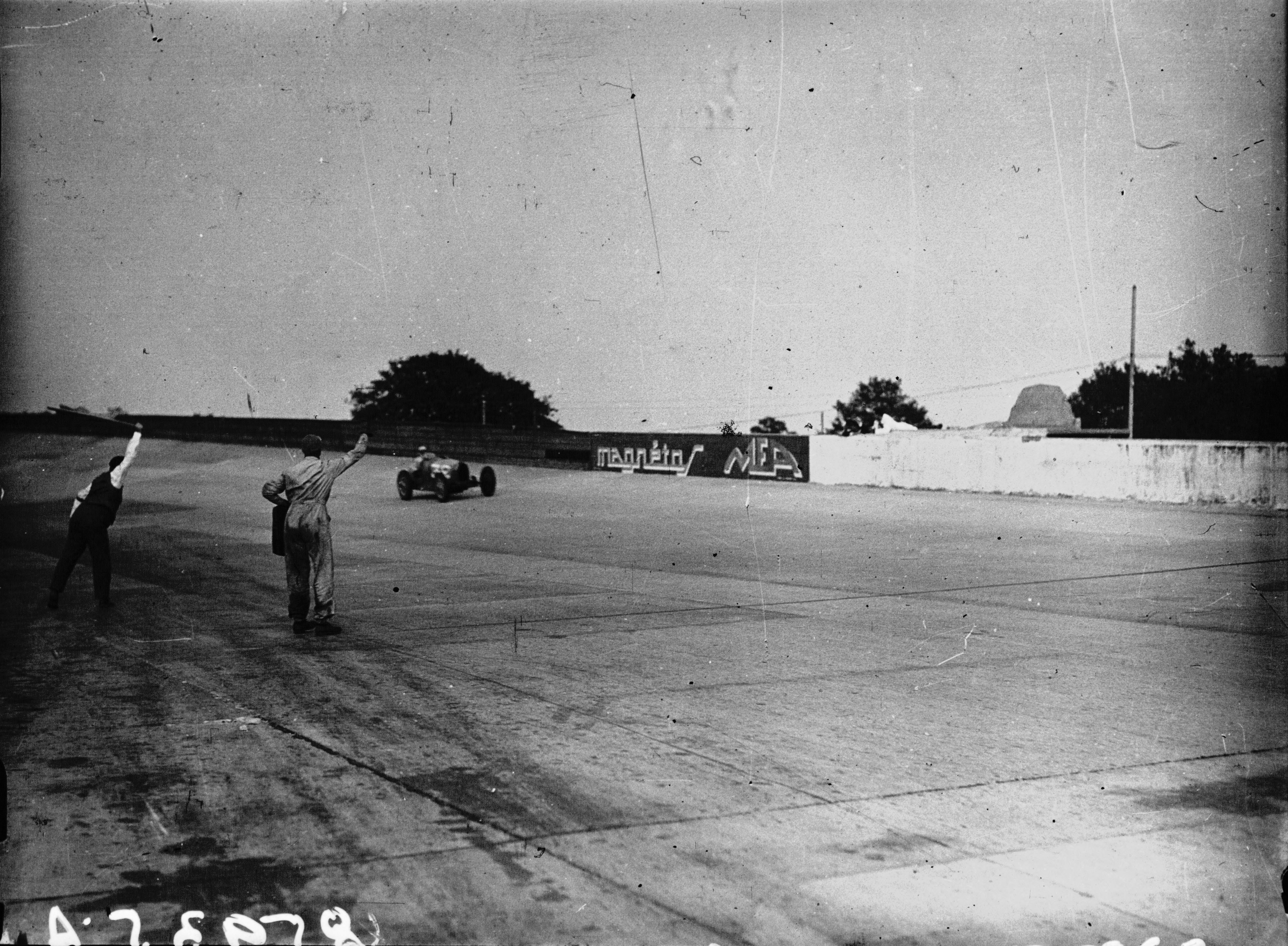
Finish of the race

Pos	No	Driver	Team	Car	Laps	Time/Retired	Grid	Points
1	32	(Monaco) Louis Chiron	Bugatti	Bugatti T51	101	126.88 km/h	12	1
1	32	(Italy) Achille Varzi	Bugatti	Bugatti T51	101	126.88 km/h	12	1
2	18	(Italy) Giuseppe Campari	Alfa Corse	Alfa Romeo 8C Monza	97	+4 Laps	5	2
2	18	(Italy) Baconin Borzacchini	Alfa Corse	Alfa Romeo 8C Monza	97	+4 Laps	5	2
3	46	(Italy) Clemente Biondetti	Maserati	Maserati 26M	94	+7 Laps	19	3
3	46	(Italy) Luigi Parenti	Maserati	Maserati 26M	94	+7 Laps	19	3
4	40	(United Kingdom) Henry Birkin	Maserati	Maserati 26M	94	+7 Laps	16	4
4	40	(United Kingdom) George Eyston	Maserati	Maserati 26M	94	+7 Laps	16	4
5	36	(France) Robert Sénéchal	Delage	Delage 15-S-8	91	+10 Laps	14	4
6	4	(Italy) Ferdinando Minoia	Alfa Corse	Alfa Romeo 8C Monza	90	+11 Laps	2	4
6	4	(Italy) Goffredo Zehender	Alfa Corse	Alfa Romeo 8C Monza	90	+11 Laps	2	4
7	28	(France) Albert Divo	Bugatti	Bugatti T51	90	+11 Laps	10	4
7	28	(France) Guy Bouriat	Bugatti	Bugatti T51	90	+11 Laps	10	4
8	20	(France) René Dreyfus	Maserati	Maserati 26M	88	+13 Laps	6	4
8	20	(Italy) Pietro Ghersi	Maserati	Maserati 26M	88	+13 Laps	6	4
9	24	(France) René Ferrant	Private entry	Peugeot 174S	85	+16 Laps	8	4
9	24	(France) Louis Rigal	Private entry	Peugeot 174S	85	+16 Laps	8	4
10	48	(France) Jean Pesato	Private entry	Alfa Romeo 6C-1750	84	+17 Laps	20	4
10	48	(France) Pierre Félix	Private entry	Alfa Romeo 6C-1750	84	+17 Laps	20	4
11	44	(Italy) Tazio Nuvolari	Alfa Corse	Alfa Romeo 8C Monza	83	+18 Laps	18	4
11	44	(Italy) Giovanni Minozzi	Alfa Corse	Alfa Romeo 8C Monza	83	+18 Laps	18	4
12	30	(United Kingdom) Earl Howe	Private entry	Bugatti T51	77	+24 Laps	11	4
12	30	(United Kingdom) Brian Lewis	Private entry	Bugatti T51	77	+24 Laps	11	4
Ret	38	(France) Jean-Pierre Wimille	Private entry	Bugatti T51	71	Suspension	15	5
Ret	38	(France) Jean Gaupillat	Private entry	Bugatti T51	71	Suspension	15	5
Ret	38	(United Kingdom) William Grover-Williams	Private entry	Bugatti T51	65	Gearbox	17	5
Ret	38	(Italy) Caberto Conelli	Private entry	Bugatti T51	65	Gearbox	17	5
Ret	34	(Italy) Emilio Eminente	Private entry	Bugatti T35B	59	Fire	13	5
Ret	34	(France) Edmond Bourlier	Private entry	Bugatti T35B	59	Fire	13	5
Ret	22	(France) Georges d'Arnoux	Private entry	Bugatti T35C	58	Mechanical	7	5
Ret	22	(France) Max Fourny	Private entry	Bugatti T35C	58	Mechanical	7	5
Ret	50	(Italy) Enzo Grimaldi	Private entry	Bugatti T35C	49	Mechanical	21	6
Ret	50	(France) "Bourgait"	Private entry	Bugatti T35C	49	Mechanical	21	6
Ret	10	(Italy) Luigi Fagioli	Maserati	Maserati 26M	45	Brakes	3	6
Ret	10	(Italy) Ernesto Maserati	Maserati	Maserati 26M	45	Brakes	3	6
Ret	58	(Germany) Rudolf Caracciola	Private entry	Mercedes-Benz SSKL	39	Supercharger	23	6
Ret	58	(Germany) Otto Merz	Private entry	Mercedes-Benz SSKL	39	Supercharger	23	6
Ret	2	(United Kingdom) William "Bummer" Scott	Delage	Delage 15-S-8	22	Rear axle	1	7
Ret	2	(United Kingdom) S. Armstrong-Payne	Delage	Delage 15-S-8	22	Rear axle	1	7
Ret	52	(France) Marcel Lehoux	Bugatti	Bugatti T51	15	Mechanical	22	7
Ret	52	(France) Philippe Étancelin	Bugatti	Bugatti T51	15	Mechanical	22	7
Ret	22	(Russia) Boris Ivanowski (Note: Ivanowski was a Russian national, but in exile since the Russian Revolution)	Private entry	Mercedes-Benz SSK	11	Differential	9	7
Ret	22	(France) Henri Stoffel	Private entry	Mercedes-Benz SSK	11	Differential	9	7
Ret	12	(United Kingdom) Jack Dunfee	Private entry	Sunbeam GP	0	Rear axle	4	7
Ret	12	(United Kingdom) Appleyard	Private entry	Sunbeam GP	0	Rear axle	4	7

== Notes ==
Grand Prix Race
Previous race: 1931 Italian Grand Prix	1931 Grand Prix season Grandes Épreuves	Next race: 1931 Belgian Grand Prix
Previous race: 1930 French Grand Prix	French Grand Prix	Next race: 1932 French Grand Prix
