= 1931 Italian Grand Prix =

- Race 1 of 3 in the 1931 European Championship

Race details
- Date: 24 May 1931
- Official name: IX Gran Premio d'Italia
- Location: Autodromo Nazionale di Monza; Monza, Italy
- Course: Permanent racing facility
- Course length: 10.00 km (6.21 miles)
- Distance: 155 laps, 1550.03 km (963.14 miles)

Pole position
Drivers	(France) Robert Sénéchal; (France) Henri Frètet	Delage
- Grid positions set by ballot

Fastest lap
Driver	(Italy) Giuseppe Campari	Alfa Romeo
- Time: 3:32.8

Podium
First	(Italy) Giuseppe Campari; (Italy) Tazio Nuvolari	Alfa Romeo
Second	(Italy) Ferdinando Minoia; (Italy) Baconin Borzacchini	Alfa Romeo
Third	(France) Albert Divo; (France) Guy Bouriat	Bugatti

The 1931 Italian Grand Prix was a Grand Prix motor race held at Monza on 24 May 1931. The race was the first of three Grands Prix that were part of the inaugural European Championship. The Alfa Romeo works team pairing of Giuseppe Campari and Tazio Nuvolari won the race, ahead of their teammates Ferdinando Minoia and Baconin Borzacchini in second, while third place went to the works Bugattis of Albert Divo and Guy Bouriat.

== Entries ==
No	Driver	Entrant	Constructor	Chassis	Engine
2	?	Officine A. Maserati	Maserati	Maserati 26M	2.5 L8
4	?	Officine A. Maserati	Maserati	Maserati 26M	2.5 L8
6	?	Officine A. Maserati	Maserati	Maserati 26M	2.5 L8
8	(Italy) Umberto Klinger (Italy) Pietro Ghersi	U. Klinger	Maserati	Maserati 26M	2.5 L8
10	(Switzerland) Carlo Pedrazzini	C. Pedrazzini	Maserati	Maserati 26B	2.0 L8
12	(Italy) Achille Varzi (Monaco) Louis Chiron	Automobiles Ettore Bugatti	Bugatti	Bugatti T51	2.3 L8
14	(France) Albert Divo (France) Guy Bouriat	Automobiles Ettore Bugatti	Bugatti	Bugatti T51	2.3 L8
16	(France) Marcel Lehoux (France) Philippe Étancelin	M. Lehoux	Bugatti	Bugatti T51	2.3 L8
18	(France) Jean-Pierre Wimille (France) Jean Gaupillat	J.-P. Wimille	Bugatti	Bugatti T51	2.3 L8
20	(France) Robert Sénéchal (France) Henri Frètet	R. Sénéchal	Delage	Delage 15S8	1.5 L8
22	(Russia) Boris Ivanowski (France) Henri Stoffel	B. Ivanowski	Mercedes-Benz	Mercedes-Benz SSK	7.1 L6
24	(Italy) Antonio Maino (Italy) Gildo Strazza	A. Maino	Mercedes-Benz	Mercedes-Benz SSK	7.1 L6
26	(Italy) Giuseppe Campari (Italy) Attilio Marinoni^{1}	SA Alfa Romeo	Alfa Romeo	Alfa Romeo 8C-2300	2.3 L8
28	(Italy) Tazio Nuvolari (Italy) Baconin Borzacchini	SA Alfa Romeo	Alfa Romeo	Alfa Romeo Type A	2x 3.5 L6
30	(Italy) Ferdinando Minoia (Italy) Goffredo Zehender	SA Alfa Romeo	Alfa Romeo	Alfa Romeo 8C-2300	2.3 L8
32	(Italy) Francesco Pirola (Italy) Giovanni Lurani	F. Pirola	Alfa Romeo	Alfa Romeo 6C-1500	1.5 L6
34	(Italy) Guglielmo Lettieri	G. Lettieri	Alfa Romeo	Alfa Romeo 6C 1750	1.7 L6
36	(Italy) Luigi Castelbarco (Italy) Tino Bianchi	L. Castelbarco	Maserati	Maserati 26M	2.5 L8
38	(Italy) Amedeo Ruggeri (Italy) Renato Balestrero	A. Ruggeri	Talbot	Talbot 700	1.7 L8
40	(Italy) Carlo di Vecchio (Italy) Gerolamo Ferrari	C. di Vecchio	Talbot	Talbot 700	1.5 L8
42	?	?	Talbot	?	?
44	(Italy) Angelo Facchetti ?	A. Fachetti	Itala	?	?
46	?	?	Bugatti	?	?
48	Villa; Gerardo Tornelli	Villa	Bugatti	?	?
50	(Italy) Alfredo Caniato (Italy) Mario Tadini	A. Caniato	Alfa Romeo	Alfa Romeo 6C 1750	1.8 L8

^1 — Luigi Arcangeli was originally designated as Campari's co-driver in car #26, but he was replaced by Marinoni after he was killed during practice.

== Starting grid ==
Grid positions were allocated by drawing lots.

First row
1	2	3
(France) Sénéchal (France) Frètet Delage	(France) Wimille (France) Gaupillat Bugatti	(Italy) Campari (Italy) Marinoni Alfa Romeo
Second row
4	5	6
(Italy) Minoia (Italy) Zehender Alfa Romeo	(France) Lehoux (France) Étancelin Bugatti	(Russia) Ivanowski (France) Stoffel Mercedes-Benz
Third row
7	8	9
(Italy) Nuvolari (Italy) Borzacchini Alfa Romeo	(Italy) di Vecchio (Italy) Ferrari Talbot	(France) Divo (France) Bouriat Bugatti
Fourth row
10	11	
(Italy) Caniato (Italy) Tadini Alfa Romeo	(Italy) Varzi (Monaco) Chiron Bugatti	
Fifth row
12	13	14
(Italy) Ruggeri (Italy) Balestrero Talbot	(Italy) Klinger (Italy) Ghersi Maserati	(Italy) Pirola (Italy) Lurani Alfa Romeo

== Classification ==
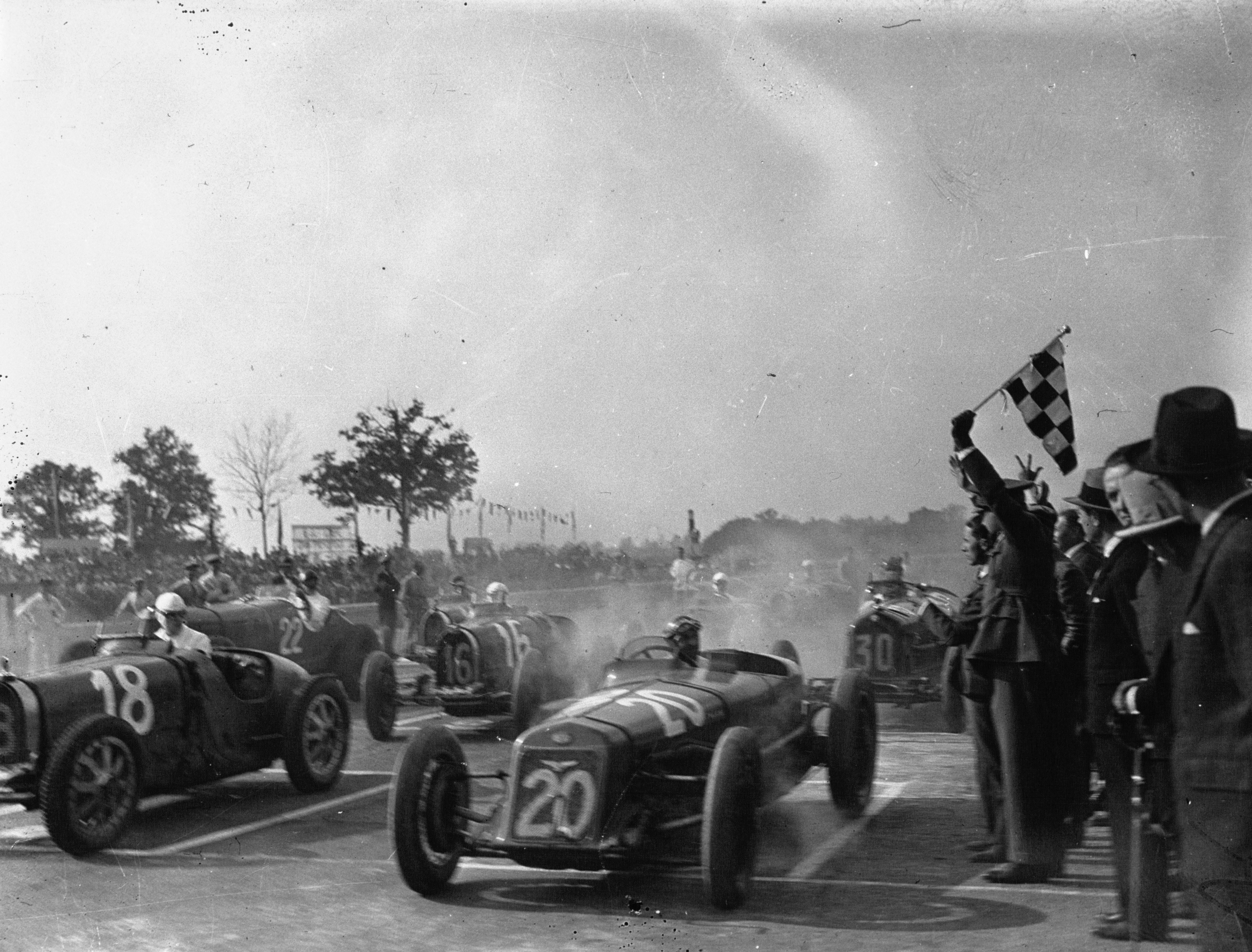
Start of the race

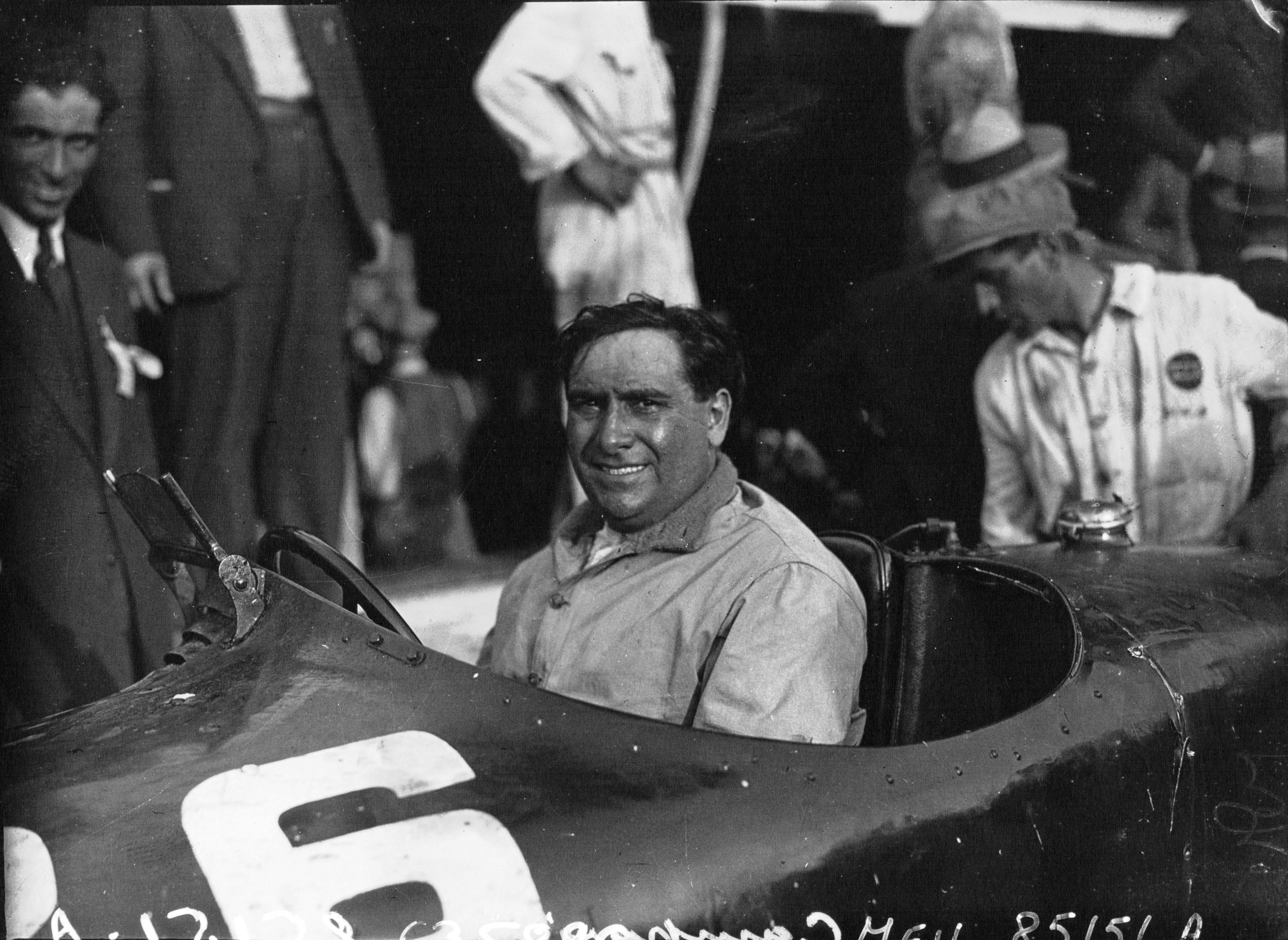
Giuseppe Campari

Pos	No	Driver	Car	Laps	Time/Retired	Distance (km)	Grid	Points
1	26	(Italy) Giuseppe Campari	Alfa Romeo 8C-2300	155	10:00:0.7	1557.754	3	1
1	26	(Italy) Tazio Nuvolari	Alfa Romeo 8C-2300	155	10:00:0.7	1557.754	3	n/a^{2}
2	30	(Italy) Ferdinando Minoia	Alfa Romeo 8C-2300	153	+2 laps	1535.087	4	2
2	30	(Italy) Baconin Borzacchini	Alfa Romeo 8C-2300	153	+2 laps	1535.087	4	n/a^{2}
3	14	(France) Albert Divo	Bugatti T51	152	+3 laps	1525.319	9	3
3	14	(France) Guy Bouriat	Bugatti T51	152	+3 laps	1525.319	9	3
4	18	(France) Jean-Pierre Wimille	Bugatti T51	138	+17 laps	1386.082	2	4
4	18	(France) Jean Gaupillat	Bugatti T51	138	+17 laps	1386.082	2	4
5	22	(Russia) Boris Ivanowski	Mercedes-Benz SSK	134	+21 laps	1343.255	6	4
5	22	(France) Henri Stoffel	Mercedes-Benz SSK	134	+21 laps	1343.255	6	4
6	32	(Italy) Francesco Pirola	Alfa Romeo 6C-1500	129	+26 laps	1290.243	14	4
6	32	(Italy) Giovanni Lurani	Alfa Romeo 6C-1500	129	+26 laps	1290.243	14	4
7	38	(Italy) Amedeo Ruggeri	Talbot 700	129	+26 laps	1290.000^{3}	12	4
7	38	(Italy) Renato Balestrero	Talbot 700	129	+26 laps	1290.000^{3}	12	4
8	8	(Italy) Umberto Klinger	Maserati 26M	114	+41 laps	1140.000	13	5
8	8	(Italy) Pietro Ghersi	Maserati 26M	114	+41 laps	1140.000	13	5
Ret	40	(Italy) Carlo di Vecchio	Talbot 700	87	+68 laps	870.000	8	5
Ret	40	(Italy) Gerolamo Ferrari	Talbot 700	87	+68 laps	870.000	8	5
NC^{4}	20	(France) Robert Sénéchal	Delage 15S8	81	+74 Laps	809.977	1	5
NC^{4}	20	(France) Henri Frètet	Delage 15S8	81	+74 Laps	809.977	1	5
Ret	16	(France) Marcel Lehoux	Bugatti T51	49	Con-rod	490.000	5	6
Ret	16	(France) Philippe Étancelin	Bugatti T51	49	Con-rod	490.000	5	6
Ret	12	(Italy) Achille Varzi	Bugatti T51	44	Differential	440.000	11	6
Ret	12	(Monaco) Louis Chiron	Bugatti T51	44	Differential	440.000	11	6
Ret	28	(Italy) Tazio Nuvolari	Alfa Romeo Type A	31	Mechanical	310.000	7	7
Ret	28	(Italy) Baconin Borzacchini	Alfa Romeo Type A	31	Mechanical	310.000	7	7
Ret	50	(Italy) Alfredo Caniato	Alfa Romeo 6C 1750	14		140.000	10	7
Ret	50	(Italy) Mario Tadini	Alfa Romeo 6C 1750	14		140.000	10	7
DNS	24	(Italy) Antonio Maino	Mercedes-Benz SSK		Did not start			8
DNS	24	(Italy) Gildo Strazza	Mercedes-Benz SSK		Did not start			8
DNS	36	(Italy) Luigi Castelbarco	Maserati 26M		Did not start			8
DNS	36	(Italy) Tino Bianchi	Maserati 26M		Did not start			8

^2 — Nuvolari and Borzacchini did not receive the points for first and second place, respectively, because they were not driving in their designated cars. The seven points apiece that they received were for driving car #28, which completed less than a quarter of the race distance. Attilio Marinoni and Goffredo Zehender, who had been designated to drive cars #26 and #30, respectively, both received eight points, since they did not take part in the race.
^3 — Ruggeri and Balestrero were initially credited with 1290.534 km, putting them in sixth place. However, their final lap took more than five minutes to complete, so the fraction of the lap completed prior to the ten-hour mark was eliminated, demoting the pair to seventh, and promoting Pirola and Lurani to sixth.
^4 — Sénéchal and Frètet were not classified because they failed to complete at least three-fifths of the number of laps achieved by the race winner.

Notes:

- The race was limited to ten hours. Each driver was allowed to complete a lap begun before the ten-hour cutoff (and retain the fraction of the lap already completed), provided that the lap took no more than five minutes.

Grand Prix Race
Previous race: 1930 French Grand Prix	1931 Grand Prix season Grandes Épreuves	Next race: 1931 French Grand Prix
Previous race: 1928 Italian Grand Prix	Italian Grand Prix	Next race: 1932 Italian Grand Prix
