= 1930 Rome Grand Prix =

Motor race

Race details
- Date: 25 May 1930
- Official name: VI Reale Premio di Roma
- Location: Circuito Tre Fontane; Rome, Italy
- Course: Road course
- Course length: 13.050 km (8.11 miles)
- Distance: 20 laps, 261.0 km (162.2 miles)
- Weather: Overcast, warm

Pole position
Driver	(Italy) Luigi Arcangeli	Maserati

Fastest lap
Driver	(Monaco) Louis Chiron	Bugatti
- Time: 5:36.6

Podium
First	(Italy) Luigi Arcangeli	Maserati
Second	(France) Guy Bouriat; (Monaco) Louis Chiron	Bugatti
Third	(Germany) Heinrich Joachim von Morgen	Bugatti

The 1930 Rome Grand Prix was a Grand Prix motor race held at the Circuito Tre Fontane on 25 May 1930. Maserati driver Luigi Arcangeli won the race, ahead of the shared works Bugatti of Guy Bouriat and Louis Chiron, and the privateer Bugatti of Heinrich Joachim von Morgen.

== Entries ==
No	Driver	Entrant	Constructor	Chassis	Engine
2	(Italy) Luigi Arcangeli	Officine Alfieri Maserati	Maserati	Maserati 26M	2.5 L8
4	(Monaco) Louis Chiron	Automobiles Ettore Bugatti	Bugatti	Bugatti T35B	2.3 L8
6	(Italy) Clemente Biondetti	Scuderia Materassi	Talbot	Talbot 700	1.5 L8
8	Pietro Nicolotti	Private entry	Alfa Romeo	Alfa Romeo 6C 1500	1.5 L6
10	(Italy) Cleto Nenzioni	Private entry	Maserati	Maserati 26B	2.1 L8
12	(Italy) Luigi Fagioli	Officine Alfieri Maserati	Maserati	Maserati 26	1.7 L8
14	(Switzerland) Fritz Caflisch	Private entry	Mercedes-Benz	Mercedes-Benz SS	7.1 L6
16	(Italy) Achille Varzi	SA Alfa Romeo	Alfa Romeo	Alfa Romeo P2	2.0 L8
18	(Italy) Giuseppe Campari	Scuderia Ferrari	Alfa Romeo	Alfa Romeo 6C 1750GS	1.8 L6
20	Arrigo Sartorio	Private entry	Maserati	Maserati 26	1.5 L8
22	(Italy) Mario Tadini	Scuderia Ferrari	Alfa Romeo	Alfa Romeo 6C 1750GS	1.8 L6
24	(Germany) Heinrich Joachim von Morgen	Private entry	Bugatti	Bugatti T35B	2.3 L8
26	(Austria) Emil Frankl	Private entry	Steyr	Steyr 4.5 Liter	4.5 L6
28	(Italy) Tazio Nuvolari	SA Alfa Romeo	Alfa Romeo	Alfa Romeo P2	2.0 L8
30	(France) Guy Bouriat	Automobiles Ettore Bugatti	Bugatti	Bugatti T35B	2.3 L8
32	(Italy) Cesare Renzi	Private entry	Bugatti	Bugatti T37A	1.5 L8
34	(Italy) Cesare Pastore	Private entry	Maserati	Maserati 26B	2.1 L8
36	Colonna de Stigliano	Private entry	Alfa Romeo	Alfa Romeo 6C 1750	1.8 L6
?	Filippo Sartorio	Enrico or F. Sartorio	Alfa Romeo	Alfa Romeo 6C 1750	1.5 L6
?	Arrigo Nenzioni	A. or E. Nenzioni	Maserati	Maserati 26	1.5 L8
?	(United Kingdom) William Grover-Williams	Automobiles Ettore Bugatti	Bugatti	Bugatti T35B	2.3 L8
?	?	Scuderia Ferrari	Alfa Romeo	Alfa Romeo P2	2.0 L8
?	?	Scuderia Ferrari	Alfa Romeo	Alfa Romeo 6C 1500	1.5 L6

== Starting grid ==
Starting grid — 1930 Rome Grand Prix
		(Italy) Arcangeli; Maserati
	(Monaco) Chiron; Bugatti	(Italy) Arcangeli; Maserati
(Italy) Biondetti; Talbot	(Monaco) Chiron; Bugatti	
		Nicolotti; Alfa Romeo
	(Italy) C. Nenzioni; Maserati	Nicolotti; Alfa Romeo
(Italy) Fagioli; Maserati	(Italy) C. Nenzioni; Maserati	
		(Switzerland) Caflisch; Mercedes-Benz
	(Italy) Varzi; Alfa Romeo	(Switzerland) Caflisch; Mercedes-Benz
(Italy) Campari; Alfa Romeo	(Italy) Varzi; Alfa Romeo	
		A. Sartorio; Maserati
	(Italy) Tadini; Alfa Romeo	A. Sartorio; Maserati
(Germany) von Morgen; Bugatti	(Italy) Tadini; Alfa Romeo	
		(Italy) Nuvolari; Alfa Romeo
	(France) Bouriat; Bugatti	(Italy) Nuvolari; Alfa Romeo
(Italy) Renzi; Bugatti	(France) Bouriat; Bugatti	

== Classification ==
=== Race ===
Pos	No	Driver	Car	Laps	Time/Retired	Grid
1	2	(Italy) Luigi Arcangeli	Maserati 26M	20	1:56:37.8	1
2	30	(France) Guy Bouriat (Monaco) Louis Chiron	Bugatti T35B	20	+1.8	14
3	24	(Germany) Heinrich Joachim von Morgen	Bugatti T35B	20	+7:47.0	12
4	6	(Italy) Clemente Biondetti	Talbot 700	20	+10:26.2	3
5	18	(Italy) Giuseppe Campari	Alfa Romeo 6C 1750GS	20	+10:41.6	9
6	14	(Switzerland) Fritz Caflisch	Mercedes-Benz SS	20	+14:34.4	7
7	22	(Italy) Mario Tadini	Alfa Romeo 6C 1750GS	20	+22:31.4	11
8	32	(Italy) Cesare Renzi	Bugatti T35C	20	+24:38.6	15
NC	8	Pietro Nicolotti	Alfa Romeo 6C 1500	20	Exceeded maximum time	4
Ret	12	(Italy) Luigi Fagioli	Maserati 26	19	Rear axle bearing	6
Ret	28	(Italy) Tazio Nuvolari	Alfa Romeo P2	19	Broken piston	13
NC	20	Arrigo Sartorio	Maserati 26	18	+2 laps	10
Ret	10	(Italy) Cleto Nenzioni	Maserati 26	12	?	5
Ret	16	(Italy) Achille Varzi	Alfa Romeo P2	6	Clutch	8
Ret	4	(Monaco) Louis Chiron	Bugatti T35B	2	Engine bearing	2
DNS	?	Filippo Sartorio	Alfa Romeo 6C 1500		Raced 1100 cc	
DNS	?	(United Kingdom) William Grover-Williams	Bugatti T35B		Reserve driver	
DNA	26	(Austria) Emil Frankl	Steyr 4.5 Liter		Did not appear	
DNA	34	(Italy) Cesare Pastore	Maserati 26B		Did not appear	
DNA	36	Colonna de Stigliano	Alfa Romeo 6C 1750		Did not appear	
DNA	?	Arrigo Nenzioni	Maserati 26		Did not appear	
DNA	?	?	Alfa Romeo P2		Did not appear	
DNA	?	?	Alfa Romeo 6C 1500		Did not appear	

- Louis Chiron took over the #30 Bugatti of Guy Bouriat on lap five, driving it for the remainder of the race.

Grand Prix Race
1930 Grand Prix season
Previous race: 1929 Rome Grand Prix	Rome Grand Prix	Next race: 1931 Rome Grand Prix
