= 1930 Targa Florio =

Grand Prix motor race

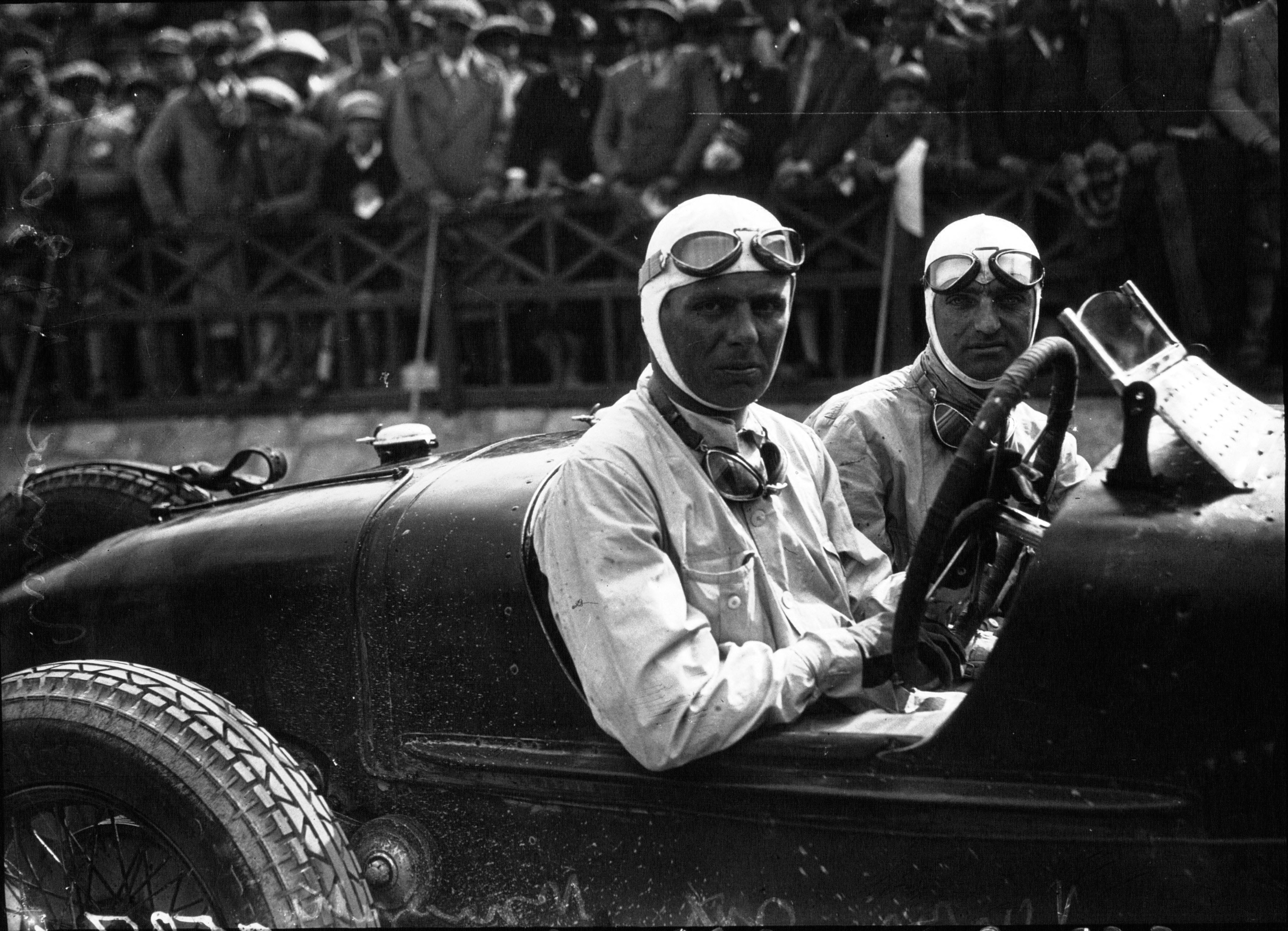
Winner Achille Varzi in Alfa Romeo P2

The 1930 Targa Florio was a non-championship Grand Prix motor race held on 4 May 1930 on the Madonie Medio Course, a 67 mile (108 km) course made up of public roads on the mountainous Italian island of Sicily.

== Race ==
Yet again in 1930 Maserati strove to win the Targa Florio. The new 2.5L cars made their debut in this race and four were entered for Luigi Arcangeli, Baconin Borzacchini and Ernesto Maserati. The opposition included a strong entry of Bugattis and OMs and from Scuderia Ferrari (now entering cars on behalf of the Alfa works) one of the rebuilt P2 for Achille Varzi and 1,75Occ six-cylinder cars for Tazio Nuvolari, Giuseppe Campari and Count Aymo Maggi. Campari was originally supposed to drive a P2, but did not and Luigi Fagioli was on the roster for the Maserati team, but didn't appear.

Scuderia Ferrari set a searing pace from the start of the race and the young and fiery Varzi pulled out a lead of 1½ minutes over team-mate Nuvolari on the first lap. Ernesto Maserati was the highest placed Bologna driver in eighth place, but he gradually fell back further down the field. Arcangeli went off the road on lap 2 because of a locking brake and retired soon afterwards. A lap later race-leader Varzi, with Chiron's Bugatti now hot on his heels, found himself in trouble. His P2 had shed its spare wheel which had damaged the fuel tank as it fell off. At the end of the lap Varzi rushed into the pits, all four wheels were changed, the mechanic grabbed a can of fuel and the Alfa roared back into the race.

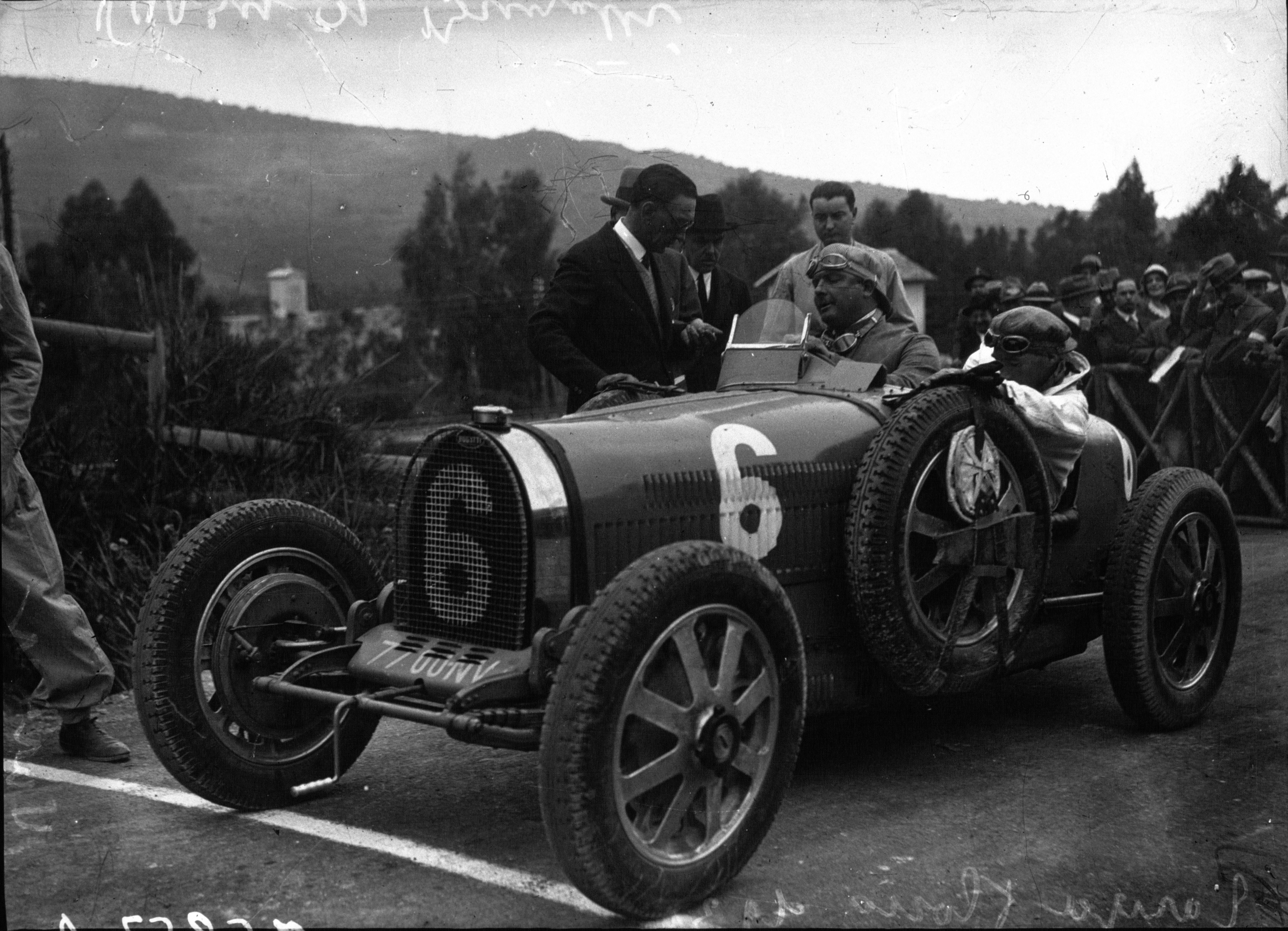
Albert Divo in Bugatti Type 35 B

When the fuel level became low and the Alfa's engine started to misfire, the mechanic knelt on his seat and began to pour the fuel from the can into the rear-mounted tank. The Alfa was bouncing badly over the rough Sicilian roads, much of the fuel was spilled and some drops falling on the hot exhaust ignited. The flames shot up round the driver's neck, but Varzi drove on while the mechanic beat them out with a scat cushion. Eventually the fire was extinguished, but valuable time had been lost and Chiron was now in the lead. It was not, however, destined to be a Bugatti race and on the run down from the town of Polizzi Chiron's brakes locked up on the loose surface and the Type 35 smashed into a retaining wall. Chiron rejoined the race to finish second behind Varzi and Conelli took third place for Bugatti ahead of the Alfa Romeos of Campari and Nuvolari. The Maseratis of Ernesto Maserati and Borzacchini finished eighth and eleventh.

Because of the extreme length of the course, the last driver to finish finished one hour and 21 minutes behind Varzi.

This was the last time the 67 mile variant of the Targa Florio course was used. For the following year, the original 92 mile variant was used because the exclusive section of the medium course that ran through the town of Polizzi was hit by a rainstorm and was deemed in no state to be driven on. Soon after, Benito Mussolini himself ordered the construction of a new road connecting the two nearby roads to bypass Caltavuturo and Polizzi Generosa, and in 1932, the shorter 44 mile variant was born, which was the variant used until the final race in 1977.

== Results ==
Pos	No	Driver	Team	Car	Laps	Time/Retired
1	30	(Italy) Achille Varzi	Alfa Corse	Alfa Romeo P2	5	6:55'16.6
2	22	(Monaco) Louis Chiron	Usines Bugatti	Bugatti Type 35 B	5	+ 1:49.0
3	46	(Italy) Caberto Conelli	Usines Bugatti	Bugatti Type 35 B	5	+7:57.4
4	44	(Italy) Giuseppe Campari	Alfa Corse	Alfa Romeo 6C 1750	5	+8:38.6
5	40	(Italy) Tazio Nuvolari	Alfa Corse	Alfa Romeo 6C 1750	5	+17:46.4
6	4	(Italy) Giuseppe Morandi	Officine Meccaniche	OM 665	5	+23:05.6
7	42	(United Kingdom) William Grover-Williams (France) Albert Divo	Usines Bugatti	Bugatti Type 35 B	5	+24:35.6
8	20	(Italy) Ernesto Maserati	Officine Alfieri Maserati	Maserati 26B	5	+33:56.8
9	18	(Italy) Guido d'Ippolito	Private entry	Alfa Romeo 6C 1500	5	+34:02.6
10	12	(Italy) Ferdinando Minoia	Officine Meccaniche	OM 665	5	+37:52.6
11	2	(Italy) Baconin Borzacchini	Officine Alfieri Maserati	Maserati 26M	5	+40:04.4
12	34	(Czechoslovakia) Otakar Bittmann	Private entry	Bugatti Type 35 C	5	+1:21:59.4
DNF	24	(Italy) Amedeo Ruggeri	Officine Meccaniche	OM 665	3	
DNF	6	(France) Albert Divo	Usines Bugatti	Bugatti Type 35B	3	Accident
DNF	14	(Italy) Luigi Arcangeli	Officine Alfieri Maserati	Maserati 26B	1	Accident
DNF	26	(Italy) Renato Balestrero	Officine Meccaniche	OM 665	0	
DNF	10	(Italy) Aymo Maggi	Alfa Corse	Alfa Romeo 6C 1750	0	
DNA		(Italy) Luigi Fagioli	Officine Alfieri Maserati			

== Sources ==
- https://www.goldenera.fi/gp3003.htm#18
- http://www.maserati-alfieri.co.uk/alfieri25.htm

Grand Prix Race
1930 Grand Prix season
Previous race: 1929 Targa Florio	Targa Florio	Next race: 1931 Targa Florio
