= 1930 Grand Prix season =

Grand Prix season

Seasons
- ← 1929 1931 →

The 1930 Grand Prix season continued the malaise that had taken over the sport. Although there was little technical advance more privateer teams were forming, getting some factory support. The AIACR continued to mandate its fuel-regulated Formula Libre (open formula) rules. Across the Atlantic, the AAA abandoned the AIACR regulations. Their new regulations were derisively called the “Junk Formula” by purists, opening up to their own version of Formula Libre: with modified stock-standard cars of up to 366 cu in (6-litres) with two seats.

In the dozen major races of the season, the honours were evenly shared by the three major manufacturers. Bugatti won the two national Grands Prix of France and Belgium, as well as at Monaco and Reims. In the Mediterranean theatre, Alfa Romeo had early success at Alessandria and the Targa Florio. Maserati finally claimed victory in their first major races, and had four wins in Italy and the San Sebastián Grand Prix in Spain. Achille Varzi was the pre-eminent driver of the season with the two race-wins for Alfa Romeo and three for Maserati, on his way to winning the Italian Drivers’ Championship.

The Indianapolis 500 produced one of the most dominant driving displays in the race's history with Billy Arnold and his modified 2.5-litre Miller. Arnold claimed pole position then led for all but two of the 200 laps, to win with a four-lap margin. With two further victories, he then went on to claim the 1930 AAA champion.

== Grand Épreuves ==
	Date	Name	Circuit	Race Regulations	Weather	Race Distance	Winner's Time	Winning driver	Winning constructor	Fastest lap	Report
5	30 May	(United States) XVIII International 500 Mile; Sweepstakes	Indianapolis	AAA	?	500 miles	4h 59m	(United States) Billy Arnold	Summers FD-Miller	not recorded	Report
	13 Jul	(Germany) German Grand Prix	Nürburgring					cancelled			
7	20 Jul	(Belgium) II Grand Prix de Belgique; VI European Grand Prix	Spa-Francorchamps	AIACR	sunny then cloudy	600 km	5h 09m	(Monaco) Louis Chiron	Bugatti Type 35C	Louis Chiron; Bugatti	Report
	23 Aug	(United Kingdom) British Grand Prix	Brooklands					cancelled			
	7 Sep	(Italy) Italian Grand Prix	Monza					not held			
11	21 Sep	(France) XXIV Grand Prix de l’ACF	Pau	Formula Libre	sunny	400 km	2h 43m	(France) Philippe Étancelin	Bugatti Type 35C	William Grover-Williams; Bugatti	Report
12	5 Oct postponed 25 Jul	(Spain) VIII Gran Premio do San Sebastián (Gran Criterium de los Ases)	Lasarte	Formula Libre	sunny	520 km	3h 43m	(Italy) Achille Varzi	Maserati Tipo 26M	Achille Varzi; Maserati	Report

A grey background indicates the race was not held this year. Sources:

== Major Races ==
Multiple classes are mentioned when they were divided and run to different race lengths.

	Date	Name	Circuit	Race Regulations	Weather	Race Distance	Winner's Time	Winning driver	Winning constructor	Report
	2 Mar	(France) Circuit d'Esterel Plage	L’Estrel beach, Saint-Raphaël	Formula Libre	?	60 km	39m	(France) René Dreyfus	Bugatti Type 35B	Report
	18 Mar	(Australia) III Australian Grand Prix	Phillip Island	Cars up to 2000cc	?	200 miles	3h 06m	(Australia) Bill Thompson	Bugatti Type 37A	Report
	23 Mar	(Libya) VI Gran Premio di Tripoli	Tagiura	Formula Libre, heats	?	100 km	43m	(Italy) Baconin Borzacchini	Maserati Tipo V4	Report
1	6 Apr	II Grand Prix de Monaco	Monte Carlo	Formula Libre	sunny then cloudy	320 km	3h 41m	(France) René Dreyfus	Bugatti Type 35B	Report
2	20 Apr	(Italy) VII Circuito di Alessandria (Gran Premio Bordino)	Alessandria	Formula Libre	rain	260 km	2h 22m	(Italy) Achille Varzi	Alfa Romeo P2	Report
	27 Apr	(French Algeria) Grand Prix d’Oranie	Arcole	Formula Libre	sunny	310 km	2h 48m	(France) Jean de Maleplane	Bugatti Type 35C	Report
3	4 May	(Italy) XXI Targa Florio	Medio Madonie	Targa Florio	sunny	540 km	6h 55m	(Italy) Achille Varzi	Alfa Romeo P2	Report
	11 May	(French Algeria) III I Grand Prix de Vitesse d’Algèrie	Staouéli	Formula Libre handicap	?	275 km (winner)	?	(France) Philippe Étancelin	Bugatti Type 35B	Report
	18 May	(France) V Grand Prix de Picardie	Péronne	Formula Libre	?	215 km (winner)	2 hours	(France) Max Fourny	Bugatti Type 37A	Report
4	25 May	(Italy) VI Premio Reale di Roma	Tre Fontane	Formula Libre	cloudy	260 km	1h 56m	(Italy) Luigi Arcangeli	Maserati Tipo 26M	Report
	9 Jun	(Belgium) V Grand Prix des Frontières	Chimay	Formula Libre	?	110 km	59m	(Belgium) Georges de Marotte	Salmson GP	Report
	15 Jun	(France) II Grand Prix de Lyon	Quincieux	Formula Libre	sunny	300 km	2h 33m	(Monaco) Louis Chiron	Bugatti Type 35C	Report
6	29 Jun	(France) VI Grand Prix de la Marne	Reims-Gueux	Formula Libre	hot	400 km	2h 49m	(France) René Dreyfus	Bugatti Type 35B	Report
	20 Jul / 6 Jul	(Germany) IV Eifelrennen	Südschleife, Nürburgring	Formula Libre	sunny	230 km	2h 09m	(Germany) Heinrich-Joachim von Morgen	Bugatti Type 35B	Report
	20 Jul / 6 Jul	(France) II Grand Prix de Dieppe	Dieppe	Formula Libre	?	290 km	2h 26m	(French Algeria) Marcel Lehoux	Bugatti Type 35B	Report
8	3 Aug / 21 Jul	(Italy) IV Coppa Ciano	Montenero	Formula Libre	hot	225 km	2h 34m	(Italy) Luigi Fagioli	Maserati Tipo 26M	Report
	10 Aug	(France) Circuit du Dauphiné	Grenoble	Formula Libre; Voiturette	sunny	240 km	2h 01m	(France) Philippe Étancelin	Bugatti Type 35C	Report
9	17 Aug	(Italy) VI Coppa Acerbo	Pescara	Formula Libre	hot	250 km	2h 06m	(Italy) Achille Varzi	Maserati Tipo 26M	Report
	17 Aug	(France) VI Grand Prix du Comminges	Saint-Gaudens	Formula Libre; Voiturette	hot	390 km	3h 13m	(France) François Miquel	Bugatti Type 35C	Report
10	7 Sep	(Italy) III Gran Premio di Monza	Monza	Formula Libre, heats	hot	240 km	1h 36m	(Italy) Achille Varzi	Maserati Tipo 26M	Report
	7 Sep	(Italy) VI Gran Premio delle Vetturette	Monza	Voiturette	hot	100 km	44m	(Italy) Luigi Premoli	Salmson	Report
	8 Sep	(Poland) Grand Prix Miasta Lwowa (Großer Preis von Lemberg)	Lviv	Formula Libre	sunny	50 km	38m	(Poland) Henryk Liefeldt	Austro Daimler ADR	Report
	21 Sep / 28 Sep	(Czechoslovakia) Masaryk Circuit	Masaryk-Ring, Brno	Formula Libre	cloudy	500 km	4h 54m	(Germany) Prinz Hermann zu Leiningen (Germany) Heinrich-Joachim von Morgen	Bugatti Type 35B	Report

== Teams and drivers ==
These tables only intend to cover entries in the major races, as keyed above. Sources:

Entrant	Constructor	Chassis	Engine	Tyre	Driver	Rounds
(France) Usines Bugatti	Bugatti	Type 35C	Bugatti 2.0L S8 s/c	M	(Monaco) Louis Chiron	1, 3, 4, 6♠, 7, 11
(France) Usines Bugatti	Bugatti	Type 35C	Bugatti 2.0L S8 s/c	M	(United Kingdom) William Grover-Williams	1, 3, 11
(France) Usines Bugatti	Bugatti	Type 35C	Bugatti 2.0L S8 s/c	M	(France) Guy Bouriat	1, 4, 7, 11
(France) Usines Bugatti	Bugatti	Type 35C	Bugatti 2.0L S8 s/c	M	(France) Albert Divo	3, 7, [11]
(France) Usines Bugatti	Bugatti	Type 35C	Bugatti 2.0L S8 s/c	M	(Italy) Conte Caberto Conelli	3
(Italy) Officine Alfieri Maserati SpA	Maserati	Tipo V4; Tipo 26M; Tipo 26B Tipo 26C	Maserati 4.0L 2x8 twin s/c Maserati 2.5L S8 s/c Maserati 2.0L S8 s/c Maserati 2.1L S8 s/c Maserati 1.1L S8 s/c	D	(Italy) Ernesto Maserati	3, 9, 10
(Italy) Officine Alfieri Maserati SpA	Maserati	Tipo V4; Tipo 26M; Tipo 26B Tipo 26C	Maserati 4.0L 2x8 twin s/c Maserati 2.5L S8 s/c Maserati 2.0L S8 s/c Maserati 2.1L S8 s/c Maserati 1.1L S8 s/c	D	(Italy) Baconin Borzacchini	1, 3, 5
(Italy) Officine Alfieri Maserati SpA	Maserati	Tipo V4; Tipo 26M; Tipo 26B Tipo 26C	Maserati 4.0L 2x8 twin s/c Maserati 2.5L S8 s/c Maserati 2.0L S8 s/c Maserati 2.1L S8 s/c Maserati 1.1L S8 s/c	D	(Italy) Luigi Arcangeli	1, 3, 4, 9, 10
(Italy) Officine Alfieri Maserati SpA	Maserati	Tipo V4; Tipo 26M; Tipo 26B Tipo 26C	Maserati 4.0L 2x8 twin s/c Maserati 2.5L S8 s/c Maserati 2.0L S8 s/c Maserati 2.1L S8 s/c Maserati 1.1L S8 s/c	D	(Italy) Luigi Fagioli	[3], 4, 8, 9, 10
(Italy) Officine Alfieri Maserati SpA	Maserati	Tipo V4; Tipo 26M; Tipo 26B Tipo 26C	Maserati 4.0L 2x8 twin s/c Maserati 2.5L S8 s/c Maserati 2.0L S8 s/c Maserati 2.1L S8 s/c Maserati 1.1L S8 s/c	D	(Italy) Achille Varzi	9, 10, 12
(Italy) Officine Alfieri Maserati SpA	Maserati	Tipo V4; Tipo 26M; Tipo 26B Tipo 26C	Maserati 4.0L 2x8 twin s/c Maserati 2.5L S8 s/c Maserati 2.0L S8 s/c Maserati 2.1L S8 s/c Maserati 1.1L S8 s/c	D	(Italy) Alfieri Maserati	10
(Italy) Officine Alfieri Maserati SpA	Maserati	Tipo V4; Tipo 26M; Tipo 26B Tipo 26C	Maserati 4.0L 2x8 twin s/c Maserati 2.5L S8 s/c Maserati 2.0L S8 s/c Maserati 2.1L S8 s/c Maserati 1.1L S8 s/c	D	(Italy) Conte Aymo Maggi	12
(Italy) Alfa Corse	Alfa Romeo	6C-1750 GS; P2	Alfa Romeo 1.75L S6 s/c Alfa Romeo 2.0L S8 s/c		(Italy) Achille Varzi	2, 3, 4, 8
(Italy) Alfa Corse	Alfa Romeo	6C-1750 GS; P2	Alfa Romeo 1.75L S6 s/c Alfa Romeo 2.0L S8 s/c		(Italy) Tazio Nuvolari	2, 3, 4
(Italy) Alfa Corse	Alfa Romeo	6C-1750 GS; P2	Alfa Romeo 1.75L S6 s/c Alfa Romeo 2.0L S8 s/c		(Italy) Giuseppe Campari	3, 8
(Italy) Alfa Corse	Alfa Romeo	6C-1750 GS; P2	Alfa Romeo 1.75L S6 s/c Alfa Romeo 2.0L S8 s/c		(Italy) Conte Aymo Maggi	3
(Italy) Alfa Corse	Alfa Romeo	6C-1750 GS; P2	Alfa Romeo 1.75L S6 s/c Alfa Romeo 2.0L S8 s/c		(Italy) Pietro Ghersi	[3]
(Italy) Officine Meccaniche	O.M.	665 S	O.M. 2.2L S 6		(Italy) Giuseppe Morandi	3
(Italy) Officine Meccaniche	O.M.	665 S	O.M. 2.2L S 6		(Italy) Ferdinando Minoia	3
(Italy) Officine Meccaniche	O.M.	665 S	O.M. 2.2L S 6		(Italy) Archimede Rosa	[3]
(France) Société des Automobiles Ariès	Ariès		Ariès 3.0L S4		(France) Arthur Duray	7
(France) Société des Automobiles Ariès	Ariès		Ariès 3.0L S4		(France) Robert Laly	[7]
(Belgium) SA des Automobiles; Impéria-Excelsior	Impéria	1800C Sport	Knight 1.8L S6 sleeve-valve		(Italy) Conte Goffredo Zehender	7
(Belgium) SA des Automobiles; Impéria-Excelsior	Impéria	1800C Sport	Knight 1.8L S6 sleeve-valve		(France) Michel Doré	7
(Belgium) SA des Automobiles; Impéria-Excelsior	Impéria	1800C Sport	Knight 1.8L S6 sleeve-valve		(France) "Elgy"	7
(Germany) Daimler-Benz AG	Mercedes-Benz	SSK	Mercedes-Benz 7.1L S6 s/c		(Germany) Rudolf Caracciola	10
(France) SA des Autos et Cycles Peugeot	Peugeot	174 S	Peugeot 4.0L S 4		(France) Henri Stoffel	7♠, 11, 12
(France) SA des Autos et Cycles Peugeot	Peugeot	174 S	Peugeot 4.0L S 4		(France) René Ferrand	11, 12
(France) SA des Autos et Cycles Peugeot	Peugeot	174 S	Peugeot 4.0L S 4		(France) Louis Rigal	[11]
(United States) Duesenberg Bros	Duesenberg	A	Duesenberg 4.2L S8	F	(United States) Babe Stapp	5
(Italy) Scuderia Materassi	Talbot	700 GPLB	Talbot 1.5L S8 s/c		(Italy) Conte Gastone Brilli-Peri	†
(Italy) Scuderia Materassi	Talbot	700 GPLB	Talbot 1.5L S8 s/c		(Italy) Clemente Biondetti	1, [2], 3, 9, 10
(Italy) Scuderia Materassi	Talbot	700 GPLB	Talbot 1.5L S8 s/c		(France) Edmond Bourlier	[1]
(Italy) Scuderia Materassi	Talbot	700 GPLB	Talbot 1.5L S8 s/c		(Italy) Marchese Antonio Brivio	9, 10
(France) Écurie Friderich	Bugatti	Type 35B; Type 35C	Bugatti 2.3L S8 s/c Bugatti 2.0L S8 s/c	D	(France) René Dreyfus	1, 6♠, [11♠]
(Italy) Scuderia Ferrari	Alfa Romeo	P2; 6C-1750 SS	Alfa Romeo 2.0L S8 s/c Alfa Romeo 1.75L S6 s/c	P	(Italy) Enzo Ferrari	[1], 2, 9
(Italy) Scuderia Ferrari	Alfa Romeo	P2; 6C-1750 SS	Alfa Romeo 2.0L S8 s/c Alfa Romeo 1.75L S6 s/c	P	(Italy) Giuseppe Campari	[1], 4, [9], 10
(Italy) Scuderia Ferrari	Alfa Romeo	P2; 6C-1750 SS	Alfa Romeo 2.0L S8 s/c Alfa Romeo 1.75L S6 s/c	P	(Italy) Alfredo Caniato	2, [9]
(Italy) Scuderia Ferrari	Alfa Romeo	P2; 6C-1750 SS	Alfa Romeo 2.0L S8 s/c Alfa Romeo 1.75L S6 s/c	P	(Italy) Mario Tadini	4
(Italy) Scuderia Ferrari	Alfa Romeo	P2; 6C-1750 SS	Alfa Romeo 2.0L S8 s/c Alfa Romeo 1.75L S6 s/c	P	(Italy) Tazio Nuvolari	8, 9, 10, [12]
(Italy) Scuderia Ferrari	Alfa Romeo	P2; 6C-1750 SS	Alfa Romeo 2.0L S8 s/c Alfa Romeo 1.75L S6 s/c	P	(Italy) Baconin Borzacchini	8, 9, 10, [12]
(Italy) Scuderia Ferrari	Alfa Romeo	P2; 6C-1750 SS	Alfa Romeo 2.0L S8 s/c Alfa Romeo 1.75L S6 s/c	P	(Italy) Luigi Arcangeli	8
(Germany) German Bugatti Team	Bugatti	Type 35B; Type 35C; Type 37A	Bugatti 2.3L S8 s/c Bugatti 2.0L S8 s/c Bugatti 1496cc S4 s/c		(Germany) Ernst-Günther Burggaller	2, 10
(Germany) German Bugatti Team	Bugatti	Type 35B; Type 35C; Type 37A	Bugatti 2.3L S8 s/c Bugatti 2.0L S8 s/c Bugatti 1496cc S4 s/c		(Germany) Heinrich-Joachim von Morgen	4, 10
(United States) Bill White Race Cars	Stevens-Miller		Miller	F	(United States) Shorty Cantlon	5
(United States) Bill White Race Cars	Stevens-Miller		Miller	F	(United States) / (Switzerland) Herman Schurch	[5]
(United States) Coleman Axle	Coleman-Miller	FD	Miller	F	(United States) Lou Moore	5
(United States) Coleman Axle	Coleman-Miller	FD	Miller	F	(United States) Phil Shafer	5
(United States) Harry Hartz	Summers-Miller	152 FD	Miller 2.5L S8	F	(United States) Billy Arnold	5
(United States) Peter DePaolo	Stevens-Duesenberg		Duesenberg	F	(United States) Pete DePaolo	5
(United States) Peter DePaolo	Stevens-Duesenberg		Duesenberg	F	(United States) Fred Roberts	[5]
(United States) Peter DePaolo	Stevens-Duesenberg		Duesenberg	F	(United States) Bill Cummings	5
(United States) Peter DePaolo	Stevens-Duesenberg		Duesenberg	F	(United States) Freddie Winnai	[5]

=== Significant Privateer drivers ===
Entrant	Constructor	Chassis	Engine	Driver	Rounds
Private Entrant	Bugatti	Type 35B	Bugatti 2.3L S8 s/c	(Belgium) Georges Bouriano	1, 2, [7], [11]
Private Entrant	Bugatti	Type 37A	Bugatti 1.5L S4 s/c	(France) Michel Doré	1, 6
Private Entrant	Bugatti	Type 35C	Bugatti 2.0L S8 s/c	(France) Philippe Étancelin	1, 6, 10, 11, 12
Private Entrant	Bugatti	Type 35B; Type 35C	Bugatti 2.3L S8 s/c Bugatti 2.0L S8 s/c	(French Algeria) Marcel Lehoux	1, 6, 10, 11, 12
Private Entrant	Bugatti	Type 35B; Type 35C	Bugatti 2.3L S8 s/c Bugatti 2.0L S8 s/c	(Chile) Juan Zanelli	1, 2, 6, [8], 11, 12
Private Entrant	Bugatti	Type 35B	Bugatti 2.3L S8 s/c	(Italy) Conte Goffredo Zehender	1
Private Entrant	Alfa Romeo	6C-1500	Alfa Romeo 1.5L S6 s/c	(Italy) Marchese Antonio Brivio	2, 8
Private Entrant	Maserati	Tipo 26B	Maserati 2.0L S8 s/c	(Italy) Cleto Nenzioni	2, [3], 4, [6]
Private Entrant	Mercedes-Benz	SSK	Mercedes-Benz 7.1L S6 s/c	(Switzerland) / (Italy) Fritz Caflisch	4, 9, 10
Private Entrant	Stutz		Stutz	(United States) Lora L. Corum	5
Private Entrant	Stevens-Miller		Miller	(United States) Louis Meyer	5
Private Entrant	Stevens-Miller		Miller	(United States) Louis Schneider	5
Private Entrant	Snowberger-Miller		Miller	(United States) Russ Snowberger	5
Private Entrant	Bugatti	Type 37A; Type 35C	Bugatti 1.5L S4 s/c Bugatti 2.0L S8 s/c	(Poland) Count Stanisław Czaykowski (France)	[6], 11
Private Entrant	Bugatti	Type 37A; Type 35C	Bugatti 1.5L S4 s/c Bugatti 2.0L S8 s/c	(France) Max Fourny	6, 10, 11, 12
Private Entrant	Bugatti	Type 37A	Bugatti 1.5L S4 s/c	(France) Jean Gaupillat	6, 11
Private Entrant	Amilcar	MCO; C6	Amilcar 1.1L S6 s/c	(Belgium) / (France) José Scaron	6, 10, [11]
Private Entrant	Montier	Spéciale	Ford 3.3L S4	(France) Charles Montier	7, 11
Private Entrant	Montier	Spéciale	Ford 3.3L S4	(France) Ferdinand Montier	7, 11
Private Entrant	Bugatti	Type 35C	Bugatti 2.0L S8 s/c	(Italy) Conte Aymo Maggi	8, 9
Private Entrant	Bentley	4½ Litre	Bentley 4.4L S4	(United Kingdom) Capt Henry “Tim” Birkin	11
Private Entrant	Bugatti	Type 35C	Bugatti 2.0L S8 s/c	(France) Jean de Maleplane	11
Private Entrant	Bugatti	Type 35C	Bugatti 2.0L S8 s/c	(France) “Sabipa” (Louis Charavel)	11
Private Entrant	Delage	Type 15S8	Delage 1.5L S8 s/c	(France) Robert Sénéchal	11, [12]
Private Entrant	Bugatti	Type 37A	Bugatti 1.5L S4 s/c	(France) Jean-Pierre Wimille	11

Note: * raced in event as a relief driver, ♠ Works driver raced as a privateer. Those in brackets show, although entered, the driver did not race
Note: † driver killed during this racing season

== Regulations and Technical ==
The AIACR persisted with its fuel economy formula introduced the year before. The Grands Prix still had to be at least 600 km long (although the official European GP event did not meet that requirement). The fuel limitation remained at 14 kg per 100 km (14.5 mpg), however the fuel mixture could now include up to 30% benzole. The fuel still had to be carried in an incongruous external fuel-tank with a visible fuel gauge. The minimum engine size remained 1100cc.

Once again, most race organisers chose to ignore the official regulations and ran their races to Formula Libre instead, including having racing cars and sports cars together in the entry lists. Only the French and Belgian Grands Prix (nominally) met the AIACR requirements. But by June, the French organisers had received not a single entry and were forced to postpone the Grand Prix and then open it up to Formula Libre. With other national races either cancelled or run as alternatives, the 1930 Championship was abandoned.

Meanwhile, in America, the AAA abandoned the AIACR regulations. Eddie Rickenbacker, owner of the Indianapolis Speedway, wanted to encourage a bigger diversity of manufacturers on the track. The board ovals were closing, limiting the single-seater racing and the Wall Street crash had slashed sponsorship. Derisively called the “Junk Formula” by purists, the new regulations opened races up to modified stock-standard cars of up to 366 cu in (6-litres) with two seats. Minimum weight was equivalent to 207 kg per litre and the only supercharged cars would be those with 2-stroke engines.

=== Technical Innovation ===
With little official manufacturer interest, there was negligible technical development from the models of the previous few years. Companies like Bugatti and Maserati weathered the economic disaster by selling the limited production of their current models to wealthy individuals. Ongoing development did continue. The Alfa Romeo P2 had first appeared in 1924. This year's model took the steering, brakes and suspension from their successful 6C sports car. With a new supercharger, the 2-litre engine now put out 175 bhp. Maserati bored out its Tipo 26 to 2.5 litres, as the 26M. The 8C-2500 engine put out 175 bhp. In contrast, Bugatti took the twin-engine concept of the Maserati V4 to produce the Type 45 sports car. The twin 8-cylinder engine was augmented by two Roots superchargers, was a combined 3.8-litres and generated a powerful 250 bhp. However, its handling was poor and it also suffered from excessive tyre wear. Instead, the works team relied on its type 35, now a 7-year-old design, with the 2.3-litre 35B and 2.0-litre 35C, both now in their fifth season.

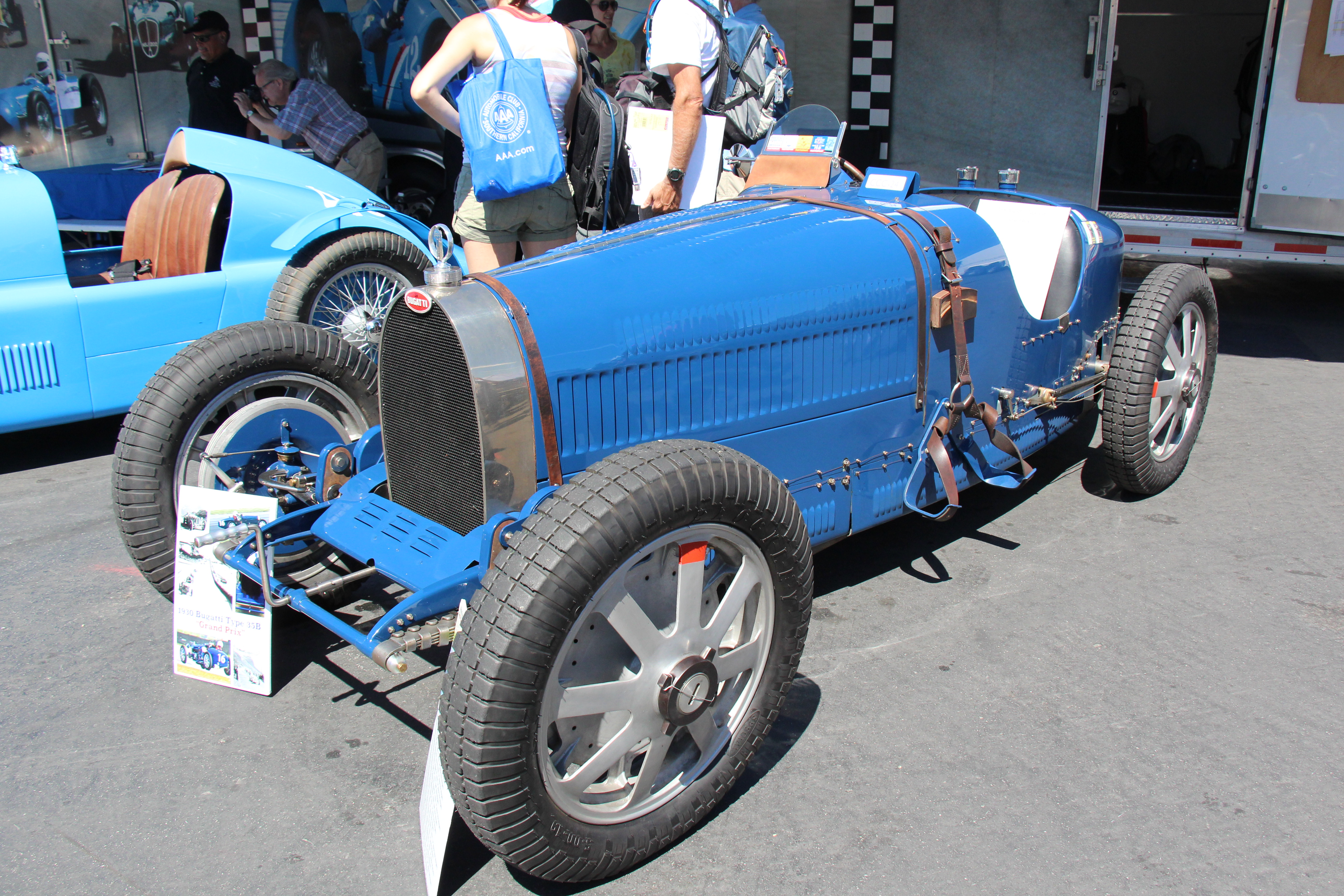
Bugatti Type 35B

Manufacturer	Model	Engine	Power Output	Max. Speed (km/h)	Dry Weight (kg)
(France) Bugatti	Type 35B	Bugatti 2.3L S8 supercharged	140 bhp	210	710
(France) Bugatti	Type 35C	Bugatti 2.0L S8 supercharged			
(France) Bugatti	Type 37A	Bugatti 1496cc S4 supercharged	90 bhp	180	720
(Italy) Maserati	Tipo V4	Maserati 4.0L twin-8 supercharged	300 bhp	255	1050
(Italy) Maserati	Tipo 26M	Maserati 2.5L S8 supercharged	175 bhp		
(Italy) Alfa Romeo	P2	Alfa Romeo 2006cc S8 supercharged	175 bhp	225	780
(Italy) Alfa Romeo	6C-1750 GS	Alfa Romeo 1752cc S6 supercharged	105 bhp	165	860
(France) / (United Kingdom) Talbot	700 GPLB	Talbot 1.7L S4 supercharged	155 bhp	210	700
(Germany) Mercedes-Benz	SSK	Mercedes-Benz 7.1L S6 part-supercharged	225 bhp		
(Austria) Austro-Daimler	ADR	Austro-Daimler 3.0L S6	120 bhp	195	1020

== Season review ==
Formed late in 1929, the new Scuderia Ferrari was the brainchild of former Alfa Corse works driver Enzo Ferrari and wealthy gentlemen drivers Alfredo Caniato and Mario Tadini. Ferrari's close relationship with Alfa Romeo enabled him to purchase former factory cars. Initially the three were the only team drivers; however Ferrari soon attracted the current Alfa works drivers to also drive for him.

=== A bad start to the season ===
The season started tragically at the Tripoli Grand Prix, the opening round of the Italian Championship. A dozen cars were entered, headed by the Maserati works team (with Baconin Borzacchini in the twin-engine V4 and Luigi Arcangeli in a 2-litre Tipo 26B) and the Scuderia Materassi with their 1.5-litre supercharged Talbot 700s for Conte Gastone Brilli-Peri and Clemente Biondetti. This year the race would be run with two four-lap heats followed by a 4-lap final. But during Saturday practice, Brilli-Peri had a serious crash while testing his team's cars. While travelling at close to top speed, he cut one of the fast, gentle corners too fine. The car flipped, throwing the driver out who was killed instantly upon impact. It overshadowed a dominant display by the Maserati drivers with Borzacchini leading a 1-2 result – the first Grand Prix win for the Maserati team.

The second Monaco Grand Prix was held a fortnight later and attracted a large, high-quality field. From 40 applications, 24 starters were selected. Once again the Bugatti works team ran the Type 35C with its supercharged 2-litre engine for their drivers Louis Chiron, William Grover-Williams and Guy Bouriat. The German customer team had Ernst-Günther Burggaller in a smaller 1.5-litre Type 37A. For the tight and narrow circuit, Maserati this time gave both drivers the Tipo 26B, with Arcangeli's bored out slightly to 2.1-litres to enter the next highest class. Alfa Romeo was not entered, so it fell upon the new Scuderia Ferrari to represent them. But they did not arrive, as the cars (for Enzo Ferrari and Giuseppe Campari) were still getting modified at the factory. The Scuderia Materassi had regrouped after their African disaster. Two cars had been entered, though only Biondetti arrived, as Brilli-Peri's car had not been repaired in time. The rest of the field were privateer drivers: from Austria came Graf Arco-Zinneberg in his big 7-litre Mercedes-Benz, and Hans Stuck in a 3.6-litre Austro-Daimler tourer. There were a raft of international Bugatti drivers including the Italian Goffredo Zehender, Chilean Juan Zanelli, Algerian Marcel Lehoux and Belgian Georges Bouriano, all driving the 2.3-litre Type 35B, while Philippe Étancelin and Swiss Hans Stuber ran the 35C. René Dreyfus had a specially modified 35B for local, former works-driver Ernest Friderich. They installed an extra 30-litre fuel tank in the passenger's seat to allow him to run non-stop in the race. Rudolf Caracciola had been expected to bring his Mercedes back to race, but pulled out at the last minute. Two other notable absentees were the Italian rivals Achille Varzi and Tazio Nuvolari, both choosing to practice for the upcoming Mille Miglia instead. As well as a first prize of FF100,000 and the prince's trophy, there were prizes for each class-winner and the class-leader at every ten of the 100 laps. Williams started from pole with a starting grid drawn by lot, but it Chiron who bolted from the second row to take the lead up the hill for the first time, and breaking the lap record on the next lap. The young Count Arco-Zinneberg was the first to retire, on the second lap, when a stone fired up by another car smashed his goggles and making him crash coming out of the tunnel. The Bugatti team initially ran 1-2-3 until Williams had to pit with magneto issues, losing four laps. Bouriano had quickly moved from 11th to 3rd in a half-dozen laps but when he tried to overtake Bouriano he went off at the chicane and also lost four laps with damaged steering. Borzacchini had been running fourth but having brake issues that culminated in the Maserati missing a corner and hitting a wall. After twenty laps, there were only 13 cars left running. Bugattis filled the top eight places, with Chiron, Bouriat, Dreyfus, Zanelli and Stuber the only ones now on the lead lap. When Arcangeli retired his Maserati on lap 30, also with brake problems it left Stuck's Austro-Daimler as the only non-Bugatti left running, albeit four laps behind with ignition problems. He also then retired two laps later with a broken clutch. At the halfway point, Chiron led Dreyfus be almost two minutes, with Bouriat, Zanelli, Stuber and Étancelin a lap behind. Dreyfus was now catching Chiron at two seconds a lap and after 60 laps the lead was down to 85 seconds. Chiron responded by setting another lap record and was able to keep the lead steady after 80 laps. His pit crew called him in to refuel and he came out only ten seconds ahead of Dreyfus who did not need to stop. Chiron was now having problems with his accelerator and the more powerful 2.3-litre engine enabled Dreyfus to pass the Monegasque on lap 85 and set a lap record three laps later. He gradually pulled away to win by 22 seconds from Chiron. Bouriat and Zanelli were three laps back and only six cars finished. It was the first major win for the driver from Nice, but both Ettore Bugatti and Chiron were annoyed to be beaten by a privateer and would not congratulate him. Dreyfus earned over FF200,000 in prizemoney and bonuses (including a 1.2% portion of proceeds from the betting totalizator). Fights broke out after the race with punters believing the race had been rigged for Chiron to lead until lap 40 when the in-race betting closed, and then to lose. The episode thereafter ended race-betting at the Monaco GP.

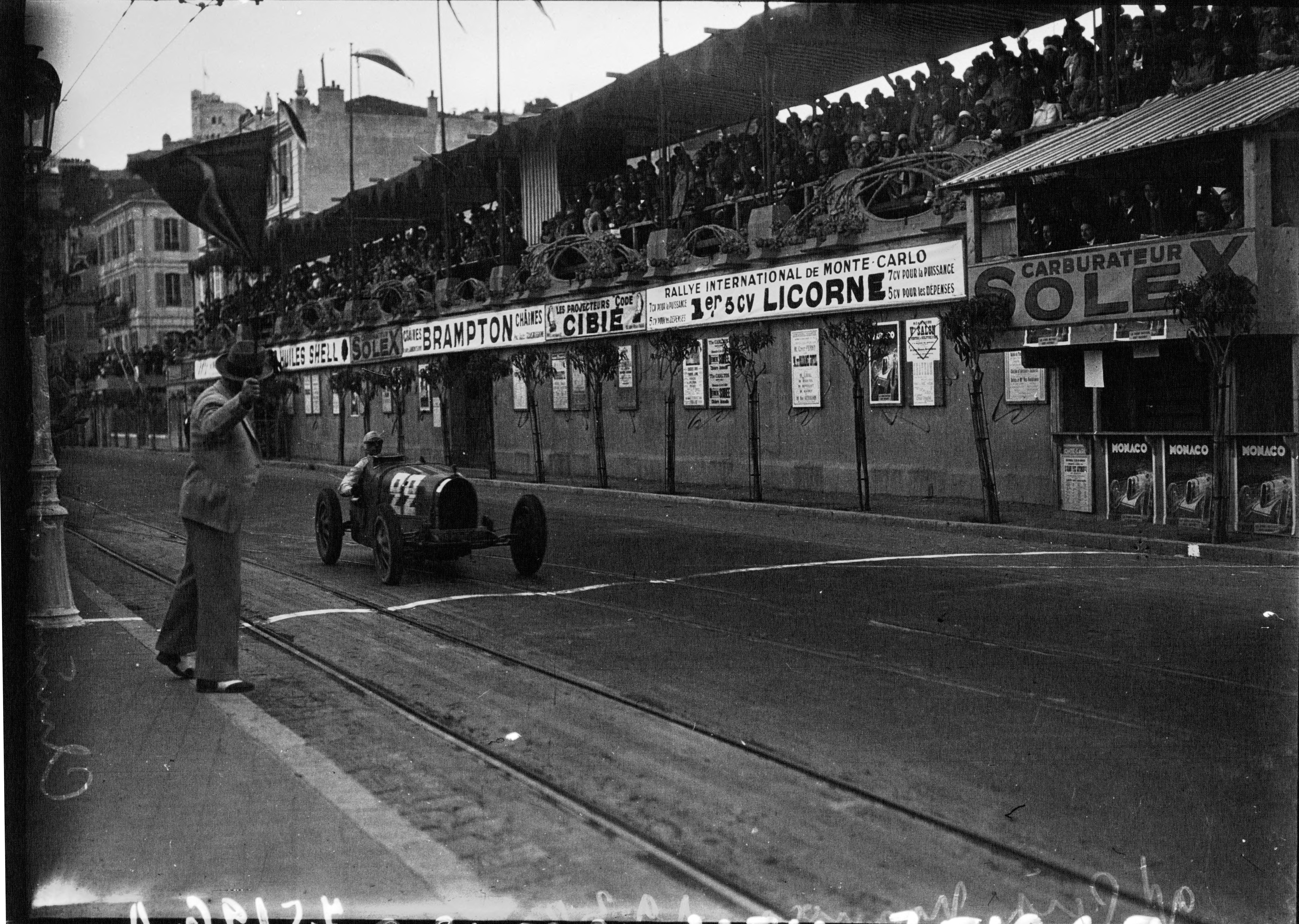
René Dreyfus winning the Monaco GP

=== City to city racing in Italy ===
In just four years, the Mille Miglia had quickly earned a premier reputation. The 1930 edition provided one of the most thrilling races. The entry list was dominated by Alfa Romeo, with the works team supported by the fledgling Scuderia Ferrari. The race became a showdown between the Alfas of Varzi and Nuvolari. Having both recorded an identical time getting to Rome (6hr 02min), Varzi was convinced the team had given him false information about Nuvolari behind him. Because, as dawn was breaking, Nuvolari saw Varzi up ahead on the road. Turning off his headlights he was able to catch and pass the surprised Varzi, going on to take the victory. His record time of 16hrs 19min for the first time averaged over 100 km/h. Alfa Romeo swept the top four places.

A week later, over Easter weekend, Alessandria held the Circuito di Pietro Bordino, the next round of the Italian Championship. A new memorial to the racing hero was unveiled and it was also the first appearance of the new Scuderia Ferrari. Georges Bouriano's Bugatti led initially until passed by Varzi. When a brief downpour swept the circuit, Bouriano crashed giving Varzi a comfortable win from Juan Zanelli with Enzo Ferrari third.

The Targa Florio promised an exciting showdown between Bugatti, winner of the last five Targas, and the Italian teams. In the absence of the Italian Grand Prix, it assumed the place as the pre-eminent local race for the season. Bugatti relied on their proven Type 35B with the supercharged 2262cc engine for their full works team, including two-time winner Albert Divo, Chiron, “Williams” and Caberto Conelli. This year, there was far less support from the gentlemen drivers, with only the Czech Ottakar Bittmann arriving. Alfa Romeo had two P2 racers for Varzi and Campari and three new 6C-1750 sports cars, driven by Nuvolari, Pietro Ghersi and Aymo Maggi. Maserati had the new 2.5-litre 26M for Borzacchini and Arcangeli, while Ernesto Maserati ran the older 2.1-litre Tipo 26B. In its sole appearance, Officine Meccaniche had its uprated version of their 665 for team regulars Giuseppe Morandi and Ferdinando Minoia along with several privateers.

In practice the Alfa Romeo team found the road-holding of the P2s not as good as previously. Also, the 38-year old veteran Campari was overweight and suffered badly from the excessive heat coming off the engine. He took over Ghersi's car. Varzi on the other hand, racing the Targa for the first time, was happy with the power advantage of the P2, with Ghersi nominated as his reserve. At 9am Borzacchini led off the 17 starters in 3-minute intervals. Varzi set a new lap record on the first lap, to lead by a minute on elapsed time from Nuvolari, Campari and the Bugattis of Chiron, Divo and Conelli. The Maseratis and OMs were already five minutes behind and off the pace. By the end of the second lap, Chiron had worked his way up to second, just over three minutes behind Varzi. Divo missed a corner and had to retire with bent suspension – no hat-trick of victories for him. Varzi, Chiron and Nuvolari all stopped for fuel and tyres on the third lap, which reduced Varzi's lead to just two minutes. On the fourth lap, going over rough potholes, the mountings of his spare wheel broke, but Varzi could not afford to stop and retrieve it. More importantly, it also damaged the fuel tank creating a small leak. Going into the last lap, Chiron was only 23 seconds behind, but his onboard mechanic had car-sickness that slowed his last pitstop. Desperate to make up time, he misjudged a corner and slid on the gravel into a wall breaking both leftside wheels. Fortunately with two spares he could continue but precious time was lost. Varzi had also stopped for fuel, but as the leak worsened the engine sputtered. Alfa Romeo had stationed a number of refuelling points for their team so the mechanic grabbed a tank and poured in the petrol while Varzi raced on. But spilled fuel dropped onto the hot exhaust and caught fire. Racing downhill to the coast, and still not stopping, Varzi told his mechanic to rip up his seat and beat the fire out with the cushion. It was a famous victory for an Italian in an Italian car, breaking the domination of the French Bugattis. Chiron was second, only two minutes behind after 7 hours of hard racing. Conelli got up to third for Bugatti ahead of Campari (delayed by gearbox problems) and Nuvolari (with suspension issues). All five cars beat Divo's time from the previous year with Varzi dropping the race record by 20 minutes.

=== First major win for Maserati ===
Many of the same protagonists met again at the Rome Grand Prix. Bugatti had Chiron and Bouriat, with “Williams” as reserve. Maserati had Arcangeli in its 26M while Luigi Fagioli ran the 1.7-litre Tipo 26. This time, Alfa Corse only ran the pair of P2s for Varzi and Nuvolari, while Campari and Tadini were hired by Ferrari to race their 6C 1750 sports cars. Biondetti had the Materassi Talbot and Fritz Caflisch let the privateers in his big Mercedes-Benz. Arcangeli was on pole and led the first lap from Varzi, Chiron, Fagioli and Nuvolari. Chiron was soon sidelined by mechanical issues but the lead five continued to pull away from the rest. A few laps later, Bouriat (running fifth) was called in to be replaced by Chiron, while Varzi retired with a broken clutch. At the halfway point Nuvolari had overtaken Arcangeli, who was still right on his tail. Chiron's hard driving back through the field had got him back to third, while Fagioli was close behind in the smaller Maserati. Nuvolari's engine also started playing up and going into the last lap, Chiron was only a second behind the Maserati. Swapping the lead back and forth, Arcangeli made a brave pass on the outside of the last corner and pulled away to claim the first major race win for Maserati. Fagioli was unlucky having his suspension break on the last lap, so third (a lap behind) went to Heinrich von Morgen from the German Bugatti team.

This year's Indianapolis 500 was run to a new formula, opened up to stock-standard cars of up to 366 cu in (6-litres) capacity. It succeeded in generating a wider variety of entrants, while still including a number of unsupercharged Millers modified to the new regulations. Riding mechanics were once again compulsory. Half the entries were from rookie drivers. Billy Arnold, driving a 2.5-litre Summers-Miller for Harry Hartz’s team, got pole position on the first day of practice. Previous winner Louis Meyer was beside him on the front row in a Stevens chassis powered by two Miller engines, along with Bill White's Stevens driven by rookie Shorty Cantlon. A surprise entry came from Italian Baconin Borzacchini driving the big Maserati V4, without its twin superchargers.

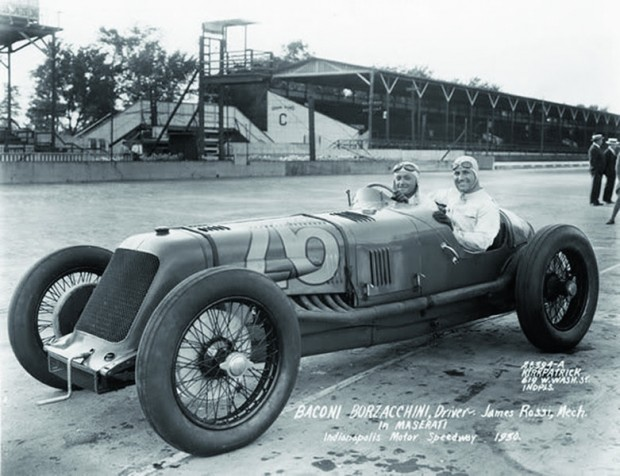
Borzacchini and his Maserati V4 at Indianapolis

From the rolling start, Meyer took the lead, which he held for the first two laps until Arnold overtook him. Arnold went on to hold his lead for the rest of the race, setting a record for most laps lead, still held to this day. He was also the first driver to average over 100 mph without a relief driver. The race was marred by several major accidents. On lap 23, Fred Roberts (reliving Pete DePaolo) crashed in turn 3, collecting six other cars in the mayhem. Worse happened eight laps later, when Cy Marshall crashed his Duesenberg at the same corner. The car went up and over the wall, tumbling 25 feet down the other side. The driver, trapped underneath the wreck, was seriously injured, however his brother Paul running as his riding mechanic was thrown out and killed. Arnold dominated more than in any previous edition of the race – from pole position, leading all but two laps to win by over 7 minutes, and four laps, ahead of Shorty Canlon. Despite the new formula, reworked Millers still took the top four places. Billy Arnold won two more of the eight races to win the AAA series.

=== Bugatti to the fore ===
Many of the top French drivers were at Reims for the Marne GP. Of the nineteen starters, all drove Bugattis – mostly the 1.5-litre Type 37A. Lehoux led initially until overtaken by Étancelin. Alongside Dreyfus and Zanelli they vied for the lead in the heat on the long fast straights. Chiron had once again encountered engine problems and then Étancelin slid on wet tar and slammed into a tree breaking a wheel. Dreyfus gradually built a lead over the others. Late in the race, Zanelli pitted to refuel but could not restart his car. Dreyfus led Lehoux home by two minutes with Michel Doré the only other finisher, a quarter hour behind, before the crowds invaded the track.

The European Grand Prix was the first race of the year run to the AIACR fuel formula, and was.organised by the Belgian association marking the 100th anniversary of Belgian independence. No Italian cars were entered and the Bugatti works team were the firm favourites. Drivers Chiron, Divo and Bouriat again raced the 2-litre supercharged T35C. To make an appearance at their auspicious home race, Belgian manufacturer Impéria-Excelsior adapted three sports models with the unusual unsupercharged sleeve-valve engine. They hired Goffredo Zehender, Michel Doré, and Jacques Ledure as their drivers. The French company Ariès had a single 3-litre for the 48-year old veteran Arthur Duray, and the Montier father and son had a pair of their modified Fords. Starting with a Model A, they lowered the suspension and fitted their own uprated engine. Among the other half-dozen privateers was Henri Stoffel running his 4-litre Peugeot 174 Sports.

The Bugattis soon made their mark and by the second lap, the three works cars had a minute lead over Stoffel and Belgian Joseph Reinartz (in a 2.3-litre Bugatti T43 sports car) and Duray. By the halfway mark after 20 laps, the order was still the same, but Stoffel was closing in. On lap 26, Chiron pitted from the lead to change sparkplugs, dropping to fourth. Bouriat inherited the lead and when Divo pitted five laps later to change wheels, Stoffel was up to second and closing fast. But a major upset was not to be, as Stoffel ran out of fuel with two laps to go, as did Reinartz and Charles Montier. Following team orders, Bouriat came to a stop to give the win to Chiron, with Divo taking third and Duray finishing over ten minutes back in fourth.

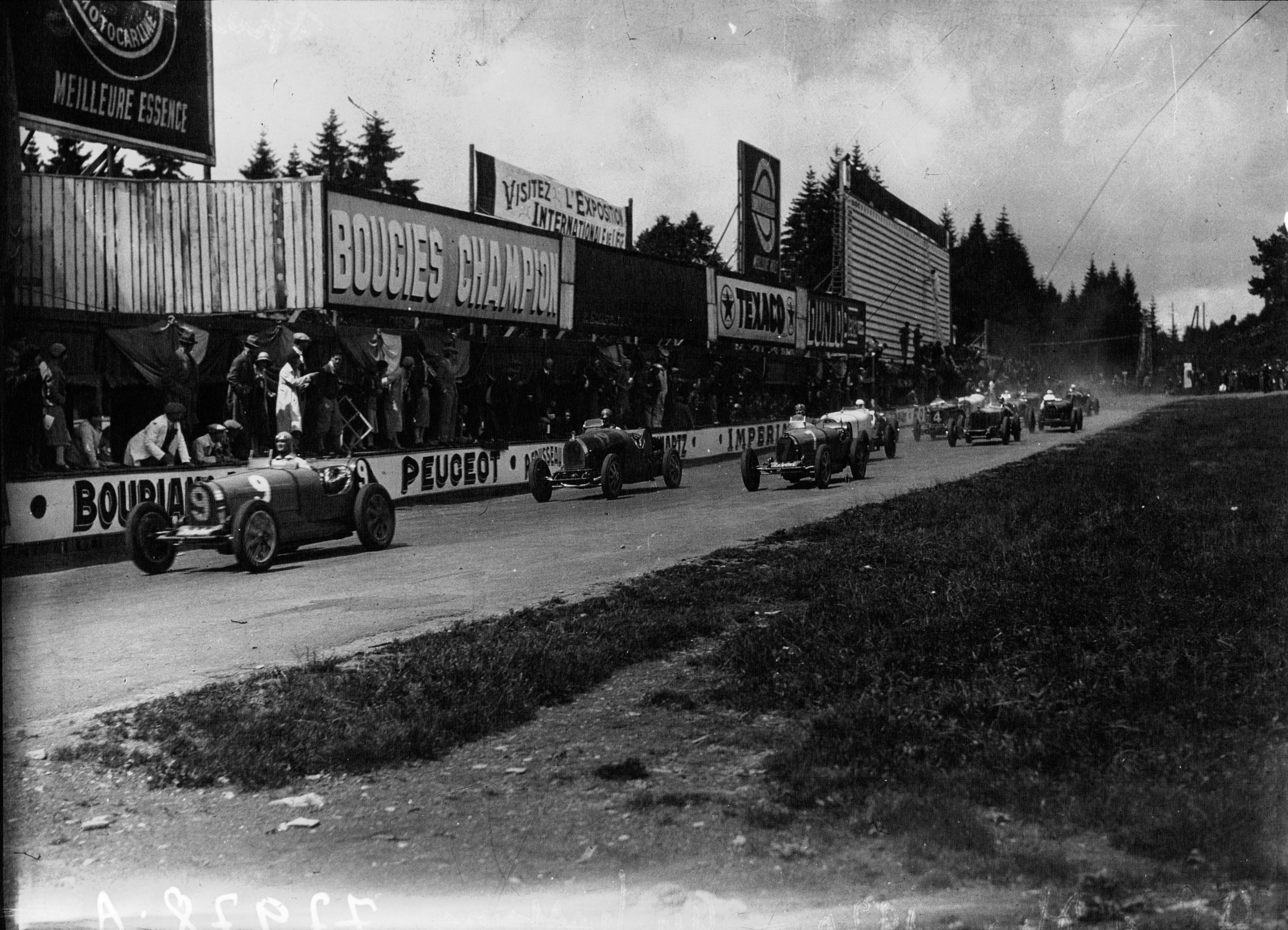
Chiron leading at the start of the Belgian GP

The seventh running of the Eifelrennen was the only circuit race of the year in Germany, and only the second time that race-cars had been to the Nürburgring since it opened in 1927. However, there were only eleven starters mixing sports and racing cars. Run on the shorter Südschleife course, it was won by Heinrich-Joachim von Morgen for the new German Bugatti team. The next round of the Italian Championship was the Coppa Ciano on the long, fast Montenero circuit. Initially it was a close duel between Varzi and Nuvolari. Both were racing P2 Alfas, but for rival teams (Alfa Corse and Scuderia Ferrari respectively). But when they both retired with mechanical issues, victory fell to Luigi Fagioli and his 2.8-litre Maserati 26M. At the next round a fortnight later, the Coppa Acerbo at Pescara, the situation was reversed when Fagioli stopped on the last lap while leading. It was Varzi, (who had left Alfa Romeo and now with Maserati, such was the enmity with Nuvolari), who won with team–owner Ernesto Maserati second and Borzacchini third for the Scuderia Ferrari.

Again, in the absence of the Italian Grand Prix and with the track still being renovated, the Monza GP was held on a modified circuit that omitted the banking. With a big field, it was again run as a series of heats with a repêcharge, leading to a 35-lap final. The Maserati works team made a concerted effort and arrived with three 2.5-litre cars for Varzi, Fagioli and Arcangeli, while Ernesto Maserati ran the V4 and Alfieri made a rare drive, with the 1.1-litre 26C. Alfa Romeo and Bugatti were represented by strong customer teams and privateers. Ferrari had Nuvolari, Borzacchini and Campari, and the German Bugatti Team had von Morgen and Burggaller. Philippe Étancelin and Marcel Lehoux led the flotilla of Bugattis. Scuderia Materassi brought its supercharged Talbots for Brivio and Biondetti. The largest-engine class had, aside from the Maserati V4, the works Mercedes of Rudolf Caracciola and Swiss privateer Fritz Caflisch. Babe Stapp also arrived from America with his 4.2-litre Duesenberg A. With a total prizemoney pool of 500,000 lire, the race attracted 66 entries and over 100000 spectators. During practice, Ferrari had found their Pirelli tyres unreliable and wanted to withdraw their Alfa Romeos. The alarmed organisers immediately cabled Rome for support. A personal hand-written reply from Benito Mussolini himself, stating “Your proposed action does not meet with my approval”, changed Ferrari's mind.

In the first heat, Étancelin narrowly beat von Morgen by two seconds, both driving 2-litre Bugattis. In the second heat, Arcangeli, Borzacchini, Fagioli and Varzi were the four qualifiers. Nuvolari was fifth when he had to pit late to change a rear tyre. With just five starters, the third heat could have been routine. But after Maserati went off the track he drove hard to come back and take the win from Caracciola, Stapp and Caflisch. Nuvolari and Campari qualified through the repêcharge and were the leaders at the start of the final. Then soon after on consecutive laps, the three Ferrari drivers (Nuvolari, Campari and Borzacchini) pitted with their tyres shredded, whereupon they were withdrawn for safety. Arcangeli and Varzi duelled for the lead, with Maserati thirty seconds behind, until Varzi had to pit and change a sparkplug. He then set about a thrilling driver back through the field. With ten laps to go, Arcangeli and Maserati were only separated by seconds, with Varzi less than a minute behind. With five laps left, he was only sixteen seconds behind. He passed Maserati two laps later and then with only a few corners to go, he took the lead and the win to a rapturous reception of the spectators.

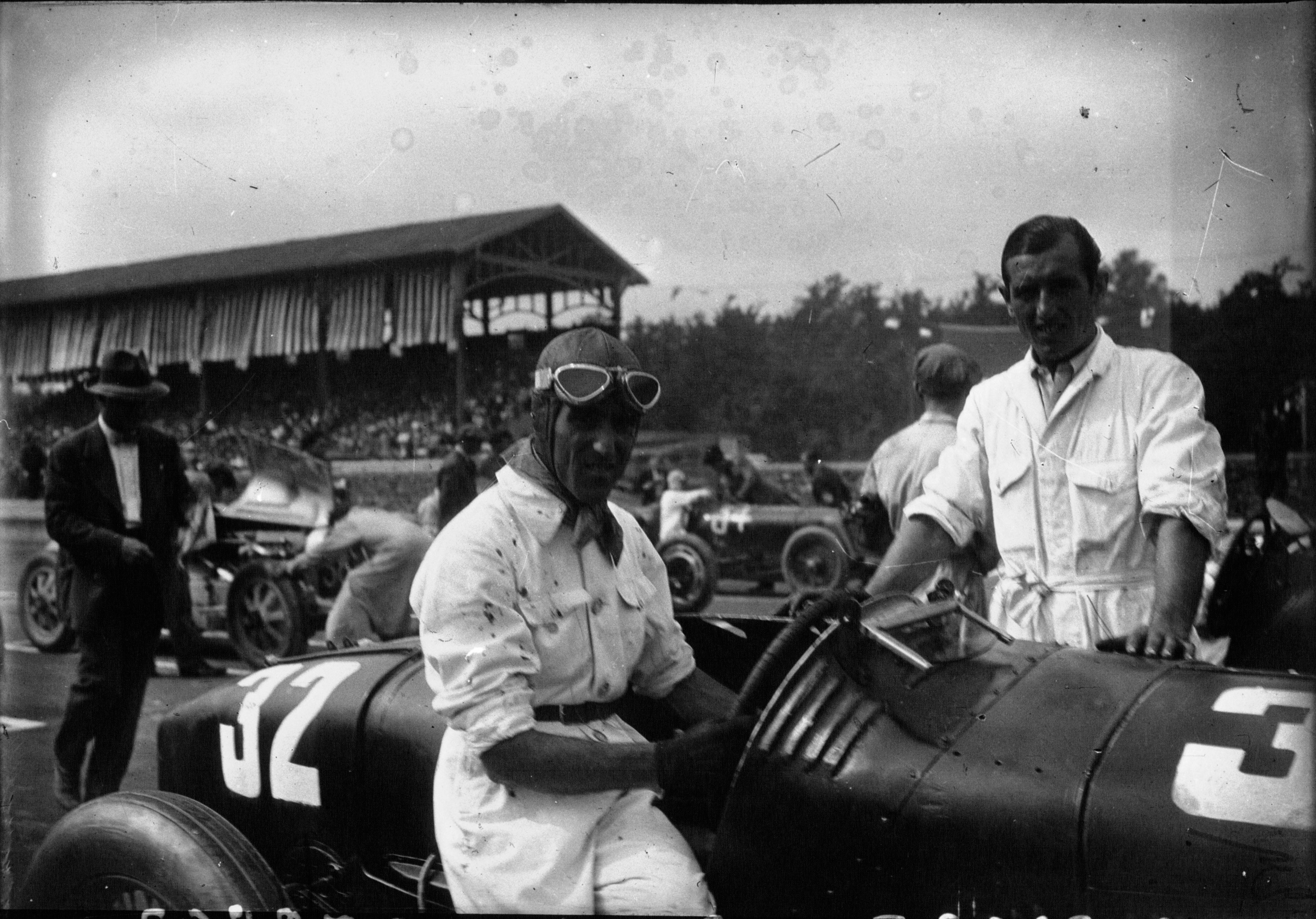
Nuvolari before the Monza GP

For the first time, the French Grand Prix was held at the southern city of Pau. The 16 km track was essentially triangular with two 5 km long fast straights. Such was the disinterest in the AIACR regulations though, that no entries had been received by June. The organisers were forced to concede and run the race as Formula Libre, postponing the race from July to September. Bugatti were still the only works team to arrive, with two cars for Bouriat and “Williams” (with Chiron and Divo as reserves). In the absence of any Italian drivers, the field still had the best of the French circuit: Étancelin, Lehoux, Zanelli and Count Stanisław Czaykowski led a dozen privateer 2-litre Bugattis. It was also the debut of a young Jean-Pierre Wimille in a 1.5-litre T37A. Robert Sénéchal had an older ex-factory Delage, the Montier father and son had their Ford-specials and Henri Stoffel his old Peugeot. The other notable entry was Briton Tim Birkin bringing a Bentley 4½ Litre sports car. Despite the day dawning with heavy rain, the race started in sunshine. After the first lap, Williams had passed 18 cars to be in the lead. Soon after, his teammate Bouriat pulled in and handed over to Louis Chiron, staying in third. Twice, Williams had to pit to change tyres, worn by his speed. On the eleventh lap, Louis Charavel crashed at the Morlaas hairpin. The driver was thrown out of his car, landing head first in the middle of the road. He was extremely fortunate not to be hit by the Peugeots and Bentley following close behind before he could stagger, dazed, to the roadside. On lap 12, at the hallway point, Chiron also had a puncture and had to limp back to the pits. This left Étancelin leading, almost three minutes ahead (half a lap) of Zanelli. Birkin was third, the Bentley being the fastest car in a straight line, getting up to 214 km/h. When Chiron blocked him when he tried to pass, he could sound his horn. Chiron returned the car back to Bouriat and Sénéchal pitted from fourth with a major, smoking, oil-leak. Étancelin had deliberately set the gearing on his car to limit his top speed, to protect the engine and tyres, and took the race-win from Birkin, just ahead of Zanelli with Czaykowski a lap behind in fourth. Neither Étancelin and Birkin had stopped, and both drivers commented they felt it was their best-driven races. By contrast, neither of the hard-charging works Bugattis finished.

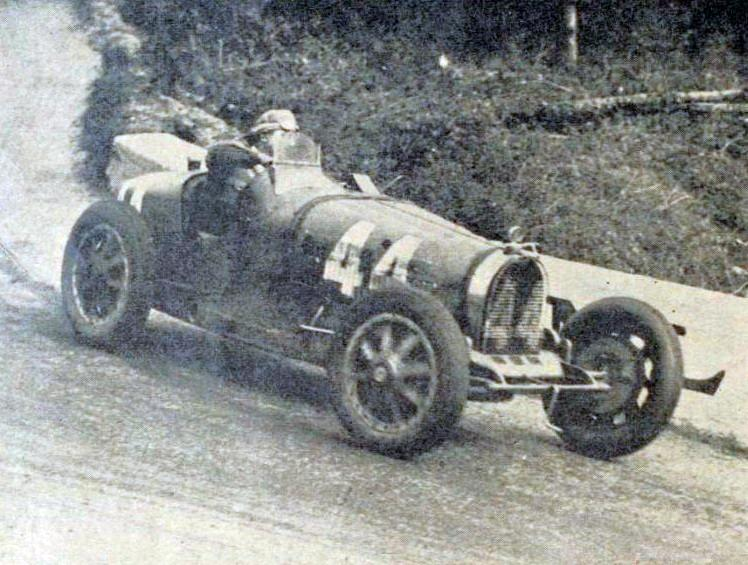
Philippe Étancelin, at the French GP, Pau

=== Racing comes to Eastern Europe ===
Organised motor-racing was making an impact in eastern Europe, where hill-climbs had already been popular. This year saw the inaugural Lwów Grand Prix in Poland (also known by its German name of Lemberg), run on the basalt-tiled streets of the city. It only attracted a small field, but the next event three weeks later got a bigger response. The first Masaryk Circuit (also known as the Czechoslovakian Grand Prix) was held at the newly set up 29 km track out from the west of the city of Brno. It attracted a number of works teams, including the local Tatra, Walter, Wikov and Zbrojovka companies. Caracciola drove for Mercedes-Benz while Impéria-Excelsior hired local driver Jiři “Georg“ Tacheci. The favourites though were the two Alfa Romeos of Scuderia Ferrari and the three cars of the German Bugatti Team. In front of a large crowd, Caracciola held the lead initially until he missed a corner and crashed, without injury. Von Morgen took the lead until he too had engine problems. He, however, had the luxury of being able to call in his teammate Leiningen to swap their cars. It meant resuming a lap (over ten minutes) behind his teammate in fourth with three laps to go. He passed his teammate Burggaller the next lap and then Leiningen came to a stop. When Nuvolari's Alfa overheated and stopped, empty of water on the last lap, von Morgen took an unlikely victory. The race was marred by a bad accident that left promising young French driver Michel Doré seriously injured, effectively ending his racing career. Nuvolari's third place would mark the last racing appearance of the classic Alfa Romeo P2, after six successful seasons.

The season wrapped up with the San Sebastián Grand Prix. Originally cancelled because of the economic crisis, it was rescheduled when the King of Spain, himself a keen motor-racing follower, intervened. As the premier Spanish race of the year, it attracted a good field. Maserati was the favourites with Varzi and Count Maggi driving the 2.5-litre 26M. In the end Scuderia Ferrari (with Nuvolari and Borzacchini) did not arrive. So competition came from the Bugattis of Dreyfus, Étancelin, Lehoux and Zanelli. There were also the two Montiers and the Peugeots of Stoffel and Ferrrand. After a rolling start in front of the king, Varzi had stormed to the lead after the first lap. There was a tight 3-way battle for second between Lehoux, Dreyfus and Zanelli. Étancelin had retired when his car rolled after breaking a wheel, fortunately without injury to the driver. When the drivers all pitted at the halfway point for fuel, Varzi had a bad stop coming out a minute behind the three Bugattis. But he made up the time and retook the lead after seven laps. The Bugattis all retired – Zanelli crashed, bringing down a telegraph pole injuring a spectator; Dreyfus was injured when he skidded and rolled his car, while Lehoux broke a driveshaft out in the countryside. Varzi had lapped the field three times to win comfortably. Maggi was second, in his last competitive race, and the two Peugeots took the next places.

Achille Varzi was the pre-eminent driver of the season with the two race-wins for Alfa Romeo and three for Maserati, on his way to winning the Italian Drivers’ Championship. While circuit racing was subdued across the Germanic countries, hill-climbs were far more popular with a European championship. Rudi Caracciola and his Mercedes were crowned European Mountain champions in 1930. In sports car racing, despite the growing ascendance of Alfa Romeo, Bentley won its fifth Le Mans victory after seeing off Caracciola's Mercedes. But it was also a tough year for serious accidents. As well as those mentioned above, including the death of Conte Gastone Brilli-Peri at the start of the season, the Baroness Aniela d’Elern had been killed in the Algerian GP handicap race in May. A month later, the English Grand Prix winner Sir Henry Segrave died in a water speed record attempt.

== Results of the season's major races ==
Pos	Driver	Team	MON (Monaco)	ALS (Italy)	TGF (Italy)	ROM (Italy)	IND (United States)	MAR (France)	BEL (Belgium)	CCN (Italy)	CAC (Italy)	MNZ (Italy)	FRA (France)	SEB (Spain)
	(Italy) Achille Varzi	SA Alfa Romeo; Officine Alfieri Maserati		1	1	Ret				Ret	1	1		1
	(France) René Dreyfus	Écurie Friderich	1					1						Ret
	(Monaco) Louis Chiron	Usines Bugatti	2		2	Ret [2]		Ret	1				Ret	
	(Italy) Luigi Arcangeli	Officine Alfieri Maserati; Scuderia Ferrari	Ret		Ret	1				Ret	Ret	2		
	(Italy) Luigi Fagioli	Officine Alfieri Maserati				Ret				1	DSQ	5		
	(United States) Billy Arnold	Harry Hartz					1							
	(France) Philippe Étancelin	Private Entry	Ret					Ret				Ret	1	Ret
	(France) Guy Bouriat	Usines Bugatti	3			2			2				Ret	
	(Italy) Ernesto Maserati	Officine Alfieri Maserati			8						2	3		
	(Chile) Juan Zanelli	Private Entry	Ret	2				Ret					3	Ret
	(Italy) Aymo Maggi	SA Alfa Romeo; Officine Alfieri Maserati			Ret					3	Ret			2
	(Italy) Giuseppe Campari	Scuderia Ferrari; SA Alfa Romeo			4	5				2		Ret		
	(United States) Shorty Cantlon	Bill White Race Cars					2							
	(French Algeria) Marcel Lehoux	Private Entry	Ret					2				DNQ	Ret	Ret
	(United Kingdom) Henry Birkin	Private Entry	Ret										2	
	(Italy) Baconin Borzacchini	Officine Alfieri Maserati; Scuderia Ferrari	Ret		11		Ret			4	3	Ret		
	(France) Michel Doré	SA des Automobiles Imperia-Excelsior	5					3	Ret					
	(Italy) Enzo Ferrari	Scuderia Ferrari		3							Ret			
	(Italy) Caberto Conelli	Usines Bugatti			3									
	(Germany) Heinrich-Joachim von Morgen	Deutsches Bugatti Team				3						Ret		
	(United States) Louis Schneider						3							
	(France) Albert Divo	Usines Bugatti			Ret [7]				3					
	(France) Henri Stoffel	SA des Autos et Cycles Peugeot							Ret				8	3
	(Italy) Goffredo Zehender	SA des Automobiles Imperia-Excelsior	4						5					
	(Italy) Antonio Brivio	Scuderia Materassi		5						Ret	4	DNQ		
	(Italy) Federico Valpreda	Private Entry		4										
	(Italy) Clemente Biondetti	Scuderia Materassi	Ret			4				Ret	Ret	DNQ		
	(United States) Louis Meyer	Private Entry					4							
	(Italy) Giorgio Faggioli	Private Entry						4						
	(France) Arthur Duray	Société des Automobiles Ariès							4					
	(Italy) Giovanni Minozzi	Private Entry		Ret								4		
	(Poland) / (France) Stanisław Czaykowski	Private Entry											4	
	(France) René Ferrand	SA des Autos et Cycles Peugeot											9	4
	(Italy) Tazio Nuvolari	Alfa Corse; Scuderia Ferrari		Ret	5	Ret				Ret	5	Ret		
	(United States) Bill Cummings	Pete DePaolo					5							
	(France) ? Louis Casali	Private Entry						5					Ret	
	(Italy) Eugenio Fontana	Private Entry								5				
	(France) Jean de l'Espée	Private Entry											5	Ret
	(France) Max Fourny	Private Entry						Ret				DNQ	Ret	5
	(Switzerland) / (Italy) Fritz Caflisch	Private Entry				6					6	Ret		
	(Italy) Arrigo Sartorio	Private Entry		6		Ret				Ret	8	DNQ		7
	(France) Jean de Maleplane	Private Entry											7	6
	(Switzerland) Hans Stuber	Private Entry	6											
	(Italy) Giuseppe Morandi	Fabbrica Officine Meccaniche				6								
	(United States) Dave Evans	Private Entry					6							
	(France) Charles Montier	Private Entry							6				Ret	Ret
	(Italy) ? Carlo Gazzabini	Private Entry								6				
	(France) Robert Sénéchal	Private Entry											6	
Pos	Driver	Team	MON (Monaco)	ALS (Italy)	TGF (Italy)	ROM (Italy)	IND (United States)	MAR (France)	BEL (Belgium)	CCN (Italy)	CAC (Italy)	MNZ (Italy)	FRA (France)	SEB (Spain)

italics show the driver of the race's fastest lap.
Only those drivers with a best finish of 6th or better, or a fastest lap, are shown. Sources:

Citations
