= Guy Bouriat =

French racing driver (1902–1933)

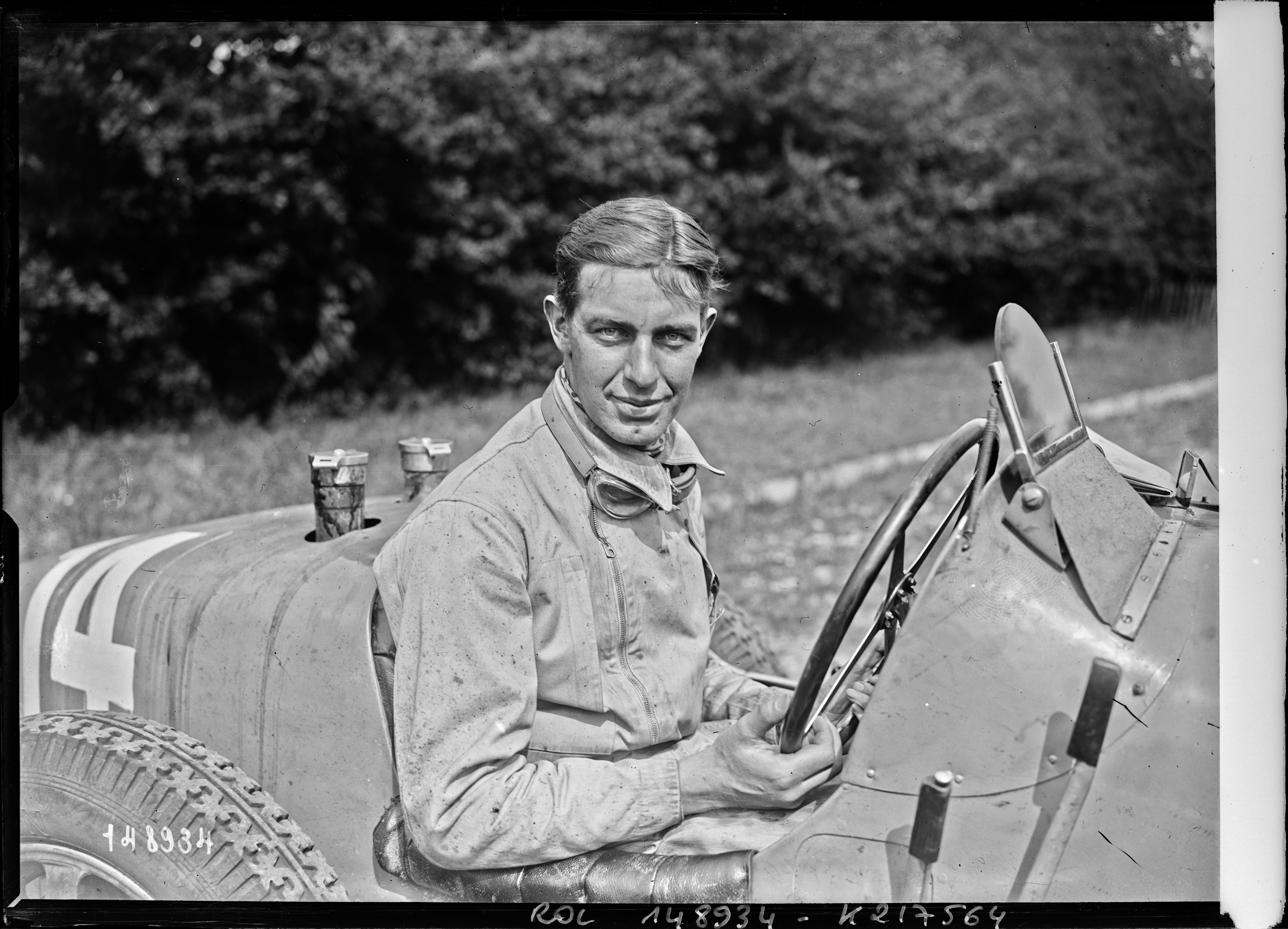
- On his Bugatti at the 1930 French Grand Prix
- Born: Comte Guy Bouriat-Quintard; 16 May 1902 Paris, France
- Died: 12 May 1933 (aged 30) Mons-en-Chaussée, France

Guy Bouriat (16 May 1902 – 12 May 1933) was a French Grand Prix driver active in the 1920s and 1930s.

== Family ==
Bouriat was born into a family based at Yvré-l'Évêque, near Le Mans, in the Sarthe. His father, René Bouriat (1872–1961), was the owner of the Château des Arches in Yvré-l’Evêque and, after giving a large donation to the Roman Catholic Church, was given the title of le Comte Bouriat-Quintard by Pope Leo XIII. His mother, Maria Antonia Manuel de Gramedo (1873–1936) was Spanish. Following military service, and showing an aptitude for mechanical work, he started working for a car factory, and in the early 1920s started motorcycle racing under the name Guy Quintard.

== Motor racing career ==
By 1926, he had switched to four wheels, and made his first appearance in the 24 Hours of Le Mans in that year, driving a 1.5 litre EHP; his best finish in La Ronde Infernale was 5th, in 1927 (for EHP) and 1929 (for Stutz). Recruited by Bugatti as a salesman, his mechanical sympathy proved useful as a test driver, and by the end of the decade had become a works driver. One of Bouriat's customers was Baron Philippe de Rothschild, who bought three T35Cs from Bouriat's Paris dealership.

He made his Grand Prix debut at the 1928 Italian Grand Prix, finishing 7th in a Bugatti T35C. In 1930, the A.I.A.C.R. tried to set up a world championship for Grand Prix drivers, and Louis Chiron was nominated as Bugatti team leader. This led to a farcical finish at the 1930 Belgian Grand Prix, as Bouriat, unexpectedly, had a lead of over 2 minutes on Chiron as the race entered its final lap, but, in accordance with team orders, Bouriat parked just before the finishing line, waiting for Chiron to finish, before he crawled over in 2nd place.

It was the closest Bouriat would ever come to a Grand Prix win. At the 1930 Rome Grand Prix, he came close to sharing in a win with Chiron, who took over his Bugatti at a quarter-distance, and finished a second behind Luigi Arcangeli.

In the 1931 Grand Prix season, with races run to over 10 hours, Bugatti teamed Albert Divo with Bouriat in the new European Championship, and the duo finished 3rd overall in the final table. The pair also led after three hours of the Le Mans 24 Hours that season, when orders came through from the team's headquarters at Molsheim to retire from the race, as Maurice Rost's Bugatti had been involved in an accident in which a spectator died.

== Death ==
Bouriat was killed near the end of the 1933 Grand Prix de Picardie, while running 2nd in his Bugatti T51 behind eventual winner Philippe Etancelin. Etancelin lapped the backmarker Julio Villars (Alfa Romeo), along the main straight between the villages of Mesnil-Bruntel and Mons-en-Chaussée, but as Bouriat tried to follow, Villars moved back into Bouriat's path, sending Bouriat's Bugatti into a tree. A memorial on the circuit commemorates both Bouriat and Louis Trintignant, who had died following an accident in practice the same year.

== Complete European Championship results ==
(key) (Races in bold indicate pole position)

| Year | Entrant | Make | 1 | 2 | 3 | EDC | Points |
|---|---|---|---|---|---|---|---|
| 1931 | Usines Bugatti | Bugatti | ITA; 3 | FRA; 7 | BEL; Ret | 3= | 12 |
| 1932 | Usines Bugatti | Bugatti | ITA; 6 | FRA | GER | – | – |

== External websites ==
- Motorsport Memorial
- Results
- Le Mans record
