= Lwów Grand Prix =

Lwow Grand Prix
- Lwów Triangle

Race information
- Number of times held: 4
- First held: 1930
- Last held: 1933
- Most wins (drivers): no repetitive winners
- Most wins (constructors): Alfa Romeo (2)
- Circuit length: 3.041 km (1.890 miles)
- Laps: 100

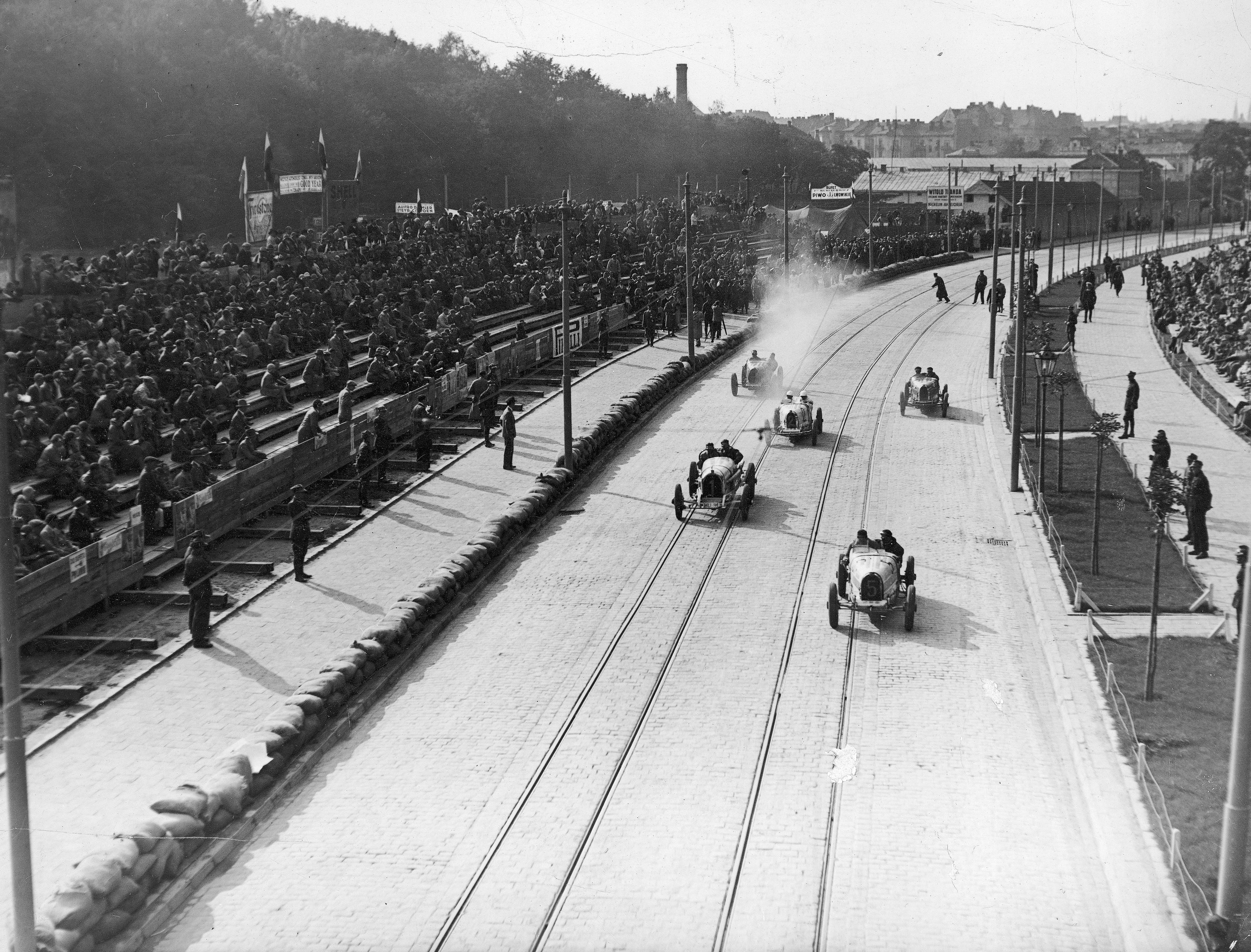
Start of the 1930 Lwów Grand Prix

Lwów Grand Prix (Polish: Grand Prix Lwowa) was a Grand Prix event held in Lwów, Second Polish Republic (now Lviv, Ukraine) between 1930 and 1933.

== History ==
=== Pre-war Grand Prix ===
Event was set up by Małopolski Klub Automobilowy (Lesser Poland Automobilclub). The street circuit had 3.041 kilometres (1.890 mi) length, it was planned in 1927, two years before the first Monaco Grand Prix. Track was named Lwów Triangle for its shape and was unique due to tram rails going through it.

First race was held in 1930 and received a good feedback from spectators. The race became international in 1931 and got a Grand Prix status in 1932, it was a rare case for a race to be named after the city and not the country. The circuit was known as one of the best European racetracks.

The 1934 race was cancelled due to financial difficulties, and any attempt to renew the racing were failing, as the World War II was coming closer and closer.

=== Return of the racing in the independent Ukraine ===
Galring street circuit map

In 1991 Soviet Union, which Lviv was part of, dissolved and Lviv became a part of Ukraine. The next year Federation Automobile de l'Ukraine was founded to organize motorsport events in the country. 1994 was the first year of Ukrainian Circuit Racing Championship (since 2018 known internationally as Ukrainian Touring Championship) and Galician Automobile Club decided to continue the tradition of the Grand Prix in the city.

The series had a different format, it was consisting of several classes, several for touring cars and several for open-wheeled cars, each group had own championship and winners. The Grand Prix could no longer be hosted on tiled road of classic Lviv, so club found an asphalt ring road to organize races at and called the track "Galring".

In 1995 the track held its first race, called "I (V) Camel Lviv City Grand Prix". It was hosting races every year until 2001.

There was an attempt to bring back the race to calendar in 2011. At the time the championship wasn't as popular as before, so there was a very small number of competitors and spectators.

=== The retro cars festival ===
In 2011 it was an 80 years anniversary of first races in Lviv, so it was decided to organize the Leopolis Grand Prix festival with a big retro cars exhibition and race on the original forgotten circuit, after that it was decided to organize such festival every year. In 2012 on such festival Federation Automobile de l'Ukraine installed the memorial sign dedicated to original races of 30's.

== Results ==
Year	Name	Circuit	Date	Winning drivers	Winning constructor	Regulations	Report
1930	(Poland) Lwów Grand Prix	Lwów	September 8	(Poland) Henryk Liefeldt	Austro-Daimler ADR	Grand Prix	Report
1931	(Poland) Lwów Grand Prix	Lwów	June 7	(Germany) Hans Stuck	Mercedes-Benz SSK	Grand Prix	Report
1932	(Poland) Lwów Grand Prix	Lwów	June 19	(Germany) Rudolf Caracciola	Alfa Romeo 8C 2300	Grand Prix	Report
1933	(Poland) Lwów Grand Prix	Lwów	June 11	(Norway) Eugen Björnstad	Alfa Romeo 8C 2300 Monza	Grand Prix	Report
