= Mario Tadini =

Italian racing driver (1905–1983)

- Born: Mario Tadini; 6 November 1905 Bergamo, Italy
- Died: 22 August 1983 (aged 77) Alessandria, Italy

Mario Tadini (6 November 1905 - 22 August 1983) was an Italian businessman and amateur racing driver, who was involved in the foundation of Scuderia Ferrari.

== Early life ==
Tadini was the son of Ercole Tadini, who owned the Grandi Magazzini Italiani Tadini, a prominent chain of clothing department stores operating across northern Italy. When he turned 15, he moved to Bologna to manage the department store there.

== Career ==
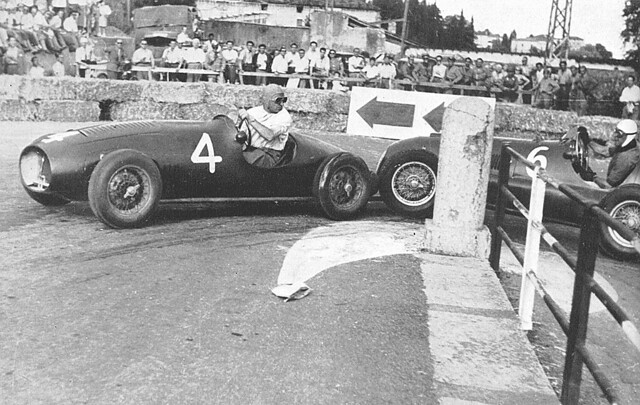
Nerfing Dorino Serafini (Osca) at the 1949 Circuito del Garda in a Ferrari 166; Tadini finished 2nd, behind team-mate Luigi Villoresi

Tadini's earliest recorded race was at the Giro delle Tre Province in 1929, and in October that year he became one of the major contributors of funds towards the foundation of the new Ferrari team; he was named the Scuderia's first chairman, although by 1932 Tadini had sold his personal interest in the company. All of Tadini's appearances of note from then until after the Second World War were in Ferrari-run Alfa Romeos.

Tadini specialized in hillclimbing, gaining the nickname of Il Re Dello Stelvio (King of the Stelvio) thanks to a run of success in the Corsa dello Stelvio (a hillclimb up the Stelvio Pass), which he won from 1933 to 1937 inclusive. He also won the prestigious Grossglockner Grand Prix in Austria in 1935 in a P3, beating Richard Seaman in his E.R.A. into second, and the sportscar section of the European Mountain Championship in 1933.

His greatest achievements on the road were runner-up finishes in the Mille Miglia in 1935, although in 1934, driving a Ferrari-entered Alfa Romeo Monza, his times between Brescia and Rome were faster than those of Tazio Nuvolari and Achille Varzi, who ultimately finished 1st and 2nd.

In the more rarefied Grand Prix arena, he was less successful. His Championship-level Grand Prix appearances were limited to the 1931 Italian Grand Prix, 1934 Italian Grand Prix, and 1936 Monaco Grand Prix, none of which he finished. Indeed, at the Monaco event, Tadini was swapped from his Alfa into Nino Farina's, which was leaking oil, and Tadini's new mount lasted a lap before it dumped a load of oil at the chicane, which caused a massive pile-up as a result. In other Grande Epreuve appearances, Tadini managed a 6th at the prestigious 1936 Tripoli Grand Prix and 7th at the 1930 Rome Grand Prix, and his best result in a national Grand Prix was 4th at the first (and only pre-war) Hungarian Grand Prix in 1936.

He continued racing on and off until 1953, his last appearance of note being a retirement in the Mille Miglia that year, in which unusually he drove a Jaguar C-Type, which he had bought that April.

== Personal life ==
Tadini married twice; his first wife, Pierina, with whom he had two sons and a daughter, died in 1955. He had two further sons with his second wife Marion. He spent the Second World War at Lesa, on the shore of Lake Maggiore.

== Results ==
- Grand Prix and Voiturette formulae
- Sports cars
