= Maserati Tipo 26M =

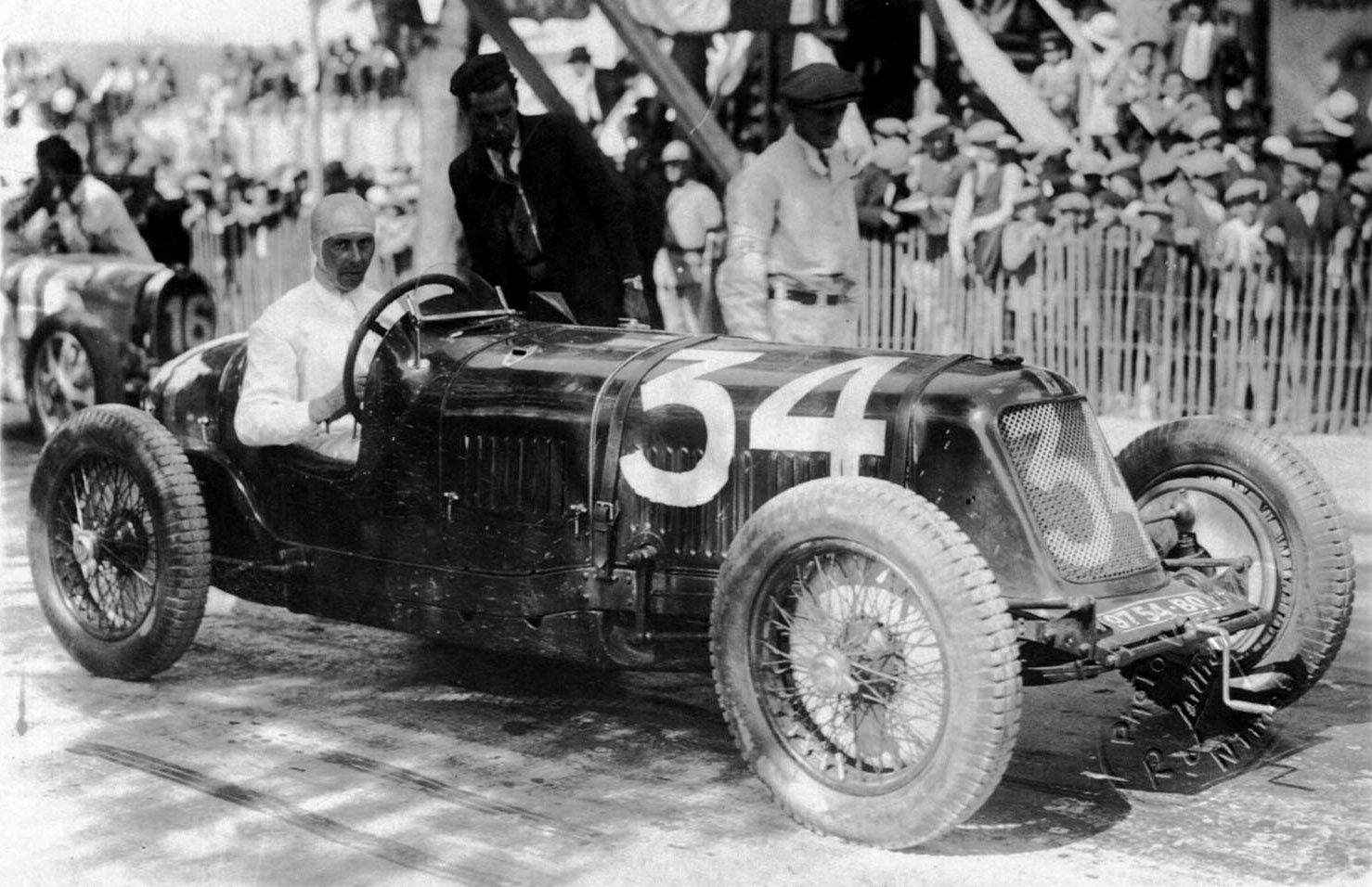

Overview
- Manufacturer: Maserati
- Also called: 8C 2500
- Production: 1930-32
- Assembly: Bologna, Italy
- Designer: Alfieri Maserati

Body and chassis
- Class: Race car
- Layout: FR layout

Powertrain
- Engine: 2.5 L I8; 2.8 L I8
- Transmission: 4 speed manual transmission

Dimensions
- Wheelbase: 2640 mm (103.9 in)
- Curb weight: 800 kg (1764 lb)

Chronology
- Predecessor: Maserati Tipo 26B
- Successor: Maserati 8C

The Maserati Tipo 26M was a model of Grand Prix race car produced by Italian manufacturer Maserati in Bologna, for a total of 13 units, between 1930 and 1932.

Before the Tipo 26M, the original Tipo 26 from 1926 had evolved into versions such as 26B, 26C and 26R. Based on these, the Tipo 26M was designed in 1930 as mostly single-seaters (M meaning monoposto) and also referred to as 8C 2500 (8 cylinder, 2500 cc). Six of the 26M were made into Tipo 26M Sport for long endurance purposes. The 26M Grand Sport by Carrozzeria Castagna and the Sport Tipo 1000 Miglia by Ugo Zagato were two-seater models for road use. Two four-seaters were later referred to as the company's first attempt at non-racing cars.

The Tipo 26M dominated the 1930 Grand Prix season having its debut at VI Premio Reale di Roma (Luigi Arcangeli won, 25 May 1930), IV Coppa Ciano (Luigi Fagioli won, 21 July 1930), VI Coppa Acerbo (Achille Varzi won, Ernesto Maserati second, 17 August 1930), III Gran Premio di Monza (Varzi won, Arcangeli second, 7 September 1930) and the VII Gran Premio de España (Varzi won, Aymo Maggi second, 5 October 1930). In the first half of the 1931 Grand Prix season it lost to the Alfa Romeo 8C and Bugatti T51.

The engine was a straight-eight with a displacement of 2495.4 cc. The bore and stroke are 65 and 94 mm, respectively. The horsepower delivered was 185 hp (136 kW) at 5600 rpm, while the compression ratio was 5.5:1.

A bored out engine with carburetors from Edoardo Weber of Bologna, became the 8C 2800. Thanks to a 69 mm (2.72 in) bore, this engine's displacement is 2811.9 cc; maximum power is 205 hp (151 kW). The 8C 2800 won at the IV Gran Premio di Monza (Luigi Fagioli, 6 September 1931) and I Mountains Championship at Brooklands (Tim Birkin, 17 October 1931). Other drivers of 26M this year were Clemente Biondetti, Luigi Parenti, George Eyston, Pietro Ghersi, Umberto Klinger and René Dreyfus.

Later victories were with Tim Birkin's 26M, III Mountains Championship (Whitney Straight, 21 October 1933) and as an 8C at Circuit d'Albi GP (Buddy Featherstonhaugh, 22 July 1934).

== Technical Data ==
Technical data	8C 2500	8C 2800
Engine:	Front mounted 8-cylinder in-line engine
Displacement:	2495 cm³	2812 cm³
Bore x stroke:	65 x 94 mm	69 x 94 mm
Max power at rpm:	185 hp at 5 500 rpm	205 hp at 5 500 rpm
Valve control:	2 overhead camshafts, 2 valves per cylinder
Compression:	5,5:1
Carburetor:	Single Weber 55AS1
Upload:	Roots compressor
Gearbox:	4-speed manual
suspension :	Stiff axles, longitudinal leaf springs
Brakes:	Mechanical drum brakes
Chassis & body:	Box beam frame with aluminum body
Wheelbase:	275 cm
Dry weight:	820 kg
Top speed:	205 km/h	220 km/h
