= Giuseppe Morandi =

Italian racing driver (1894–1977)

Cavaliere Giuseppe Morandi
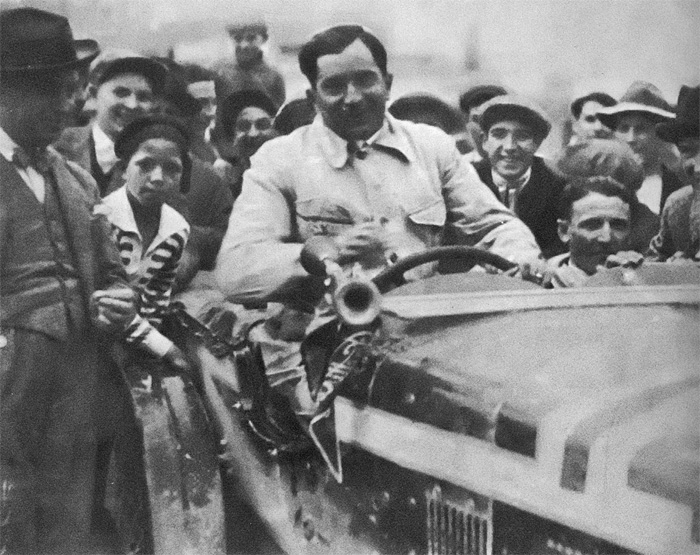
- Morandi (right) with Minoia after the 1927 Mille Miglia
- Born: Giuseppe Morandi; 10 February 1894 Castiglione delle Stiviere, Italy
- Died: 31 October 1977 (aged 83) Brescia, Italy

Giuseppe Morandi (10 May 1894 – 31 October 1977) was an Italian racing driver active before the Second World War.

== Career ==
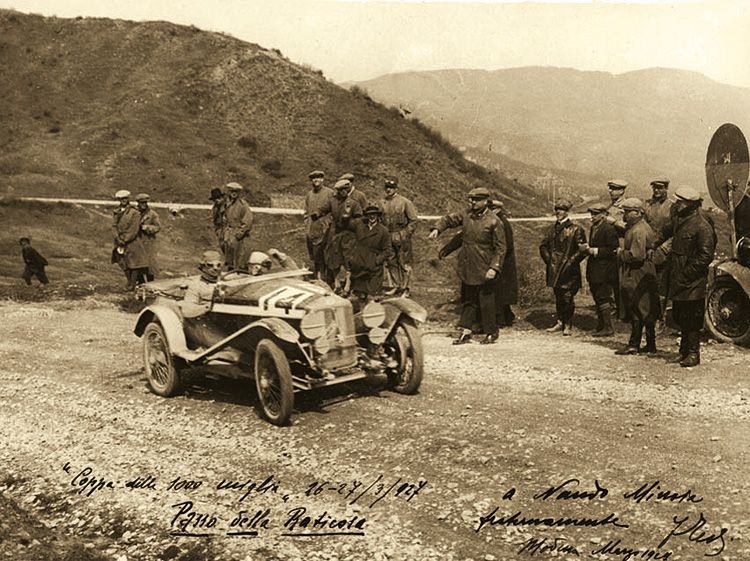
En route to the 1927 Mille Migliae victory, at the Raticosa pass

Morandi started his career as a test driver for the O.M. car manufacturer, and in 1921 he made his racing debut, finishing sixth in the Gran Premio delle Vetturette at Brescia, a minute behind team-mate Ferdinando Minoia.

His first win of note was the 1924 Circuito del Mugello, and in 1927 drove one of the three factory O.M 665 Sport Superbas in the first Mille Miglia, sharing with Minoia. The duo headed an O.M. 1–2–3, finishing 16 minutes clear of their team-mates.

Morandi's sole national Grand Prix was the 1927 Italian Grand Prix at Monza, finishing 2nd on an O.M. 865, despite stalling on the start-line and getting going well behind the field; he had raced in a heat at the Gran Premio di Roma earlier in the season, and finished 6th in the Grand Prix-equivalent Targa Florio in 1930 driving a 665. Spurning offers from Enzo Ferrari and the Maserati brothers, he remained loyal to O.M. through his career, winning the 1929, 1930, and 1931 Giro de Sicilia for the marque.

A FIAT takeover of O.M. in 1933 saw the marque withdraw from racing, and Morandi returned to test driving. He returned to racing in the 1947 Mille Miglia, in a Fiat 1100 Berlinetta, finishing 53rd after a penalty.

After his retirement, he was awarded the title of Cavaliere del Lavoro. Morandi died in a Brescia clinic in 1977.
