= Luigi Arcangeli =

Italian motorcycle racer and racing driver (1902–1931)

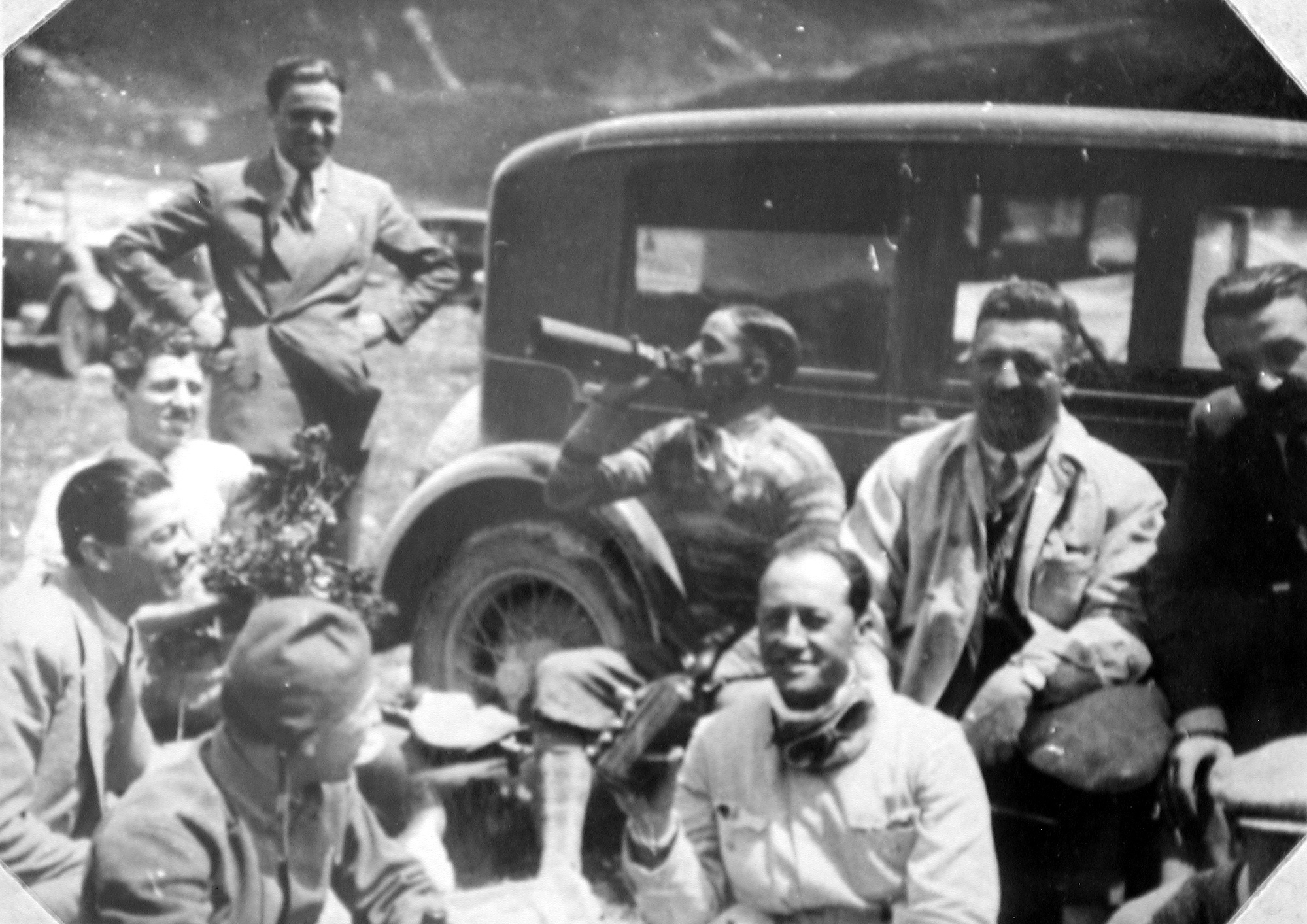
- Arcangeli (in front, right), with other Alfa Romeo drivers and Enzo Ferrari behind him.
- Nationality: (Italy) Italian
- Born: 1902
- Died: 1931 (aged 28–29)
Motorcycle racing career statistics
Isle of Man TT career
TTs contested	3 (1926-1928)
TT wins	0
TT podiums	1

Luigi Arcangeli (1902 - 23 May 1931) was an Italian motorcycle and car racer.

== Biography ==
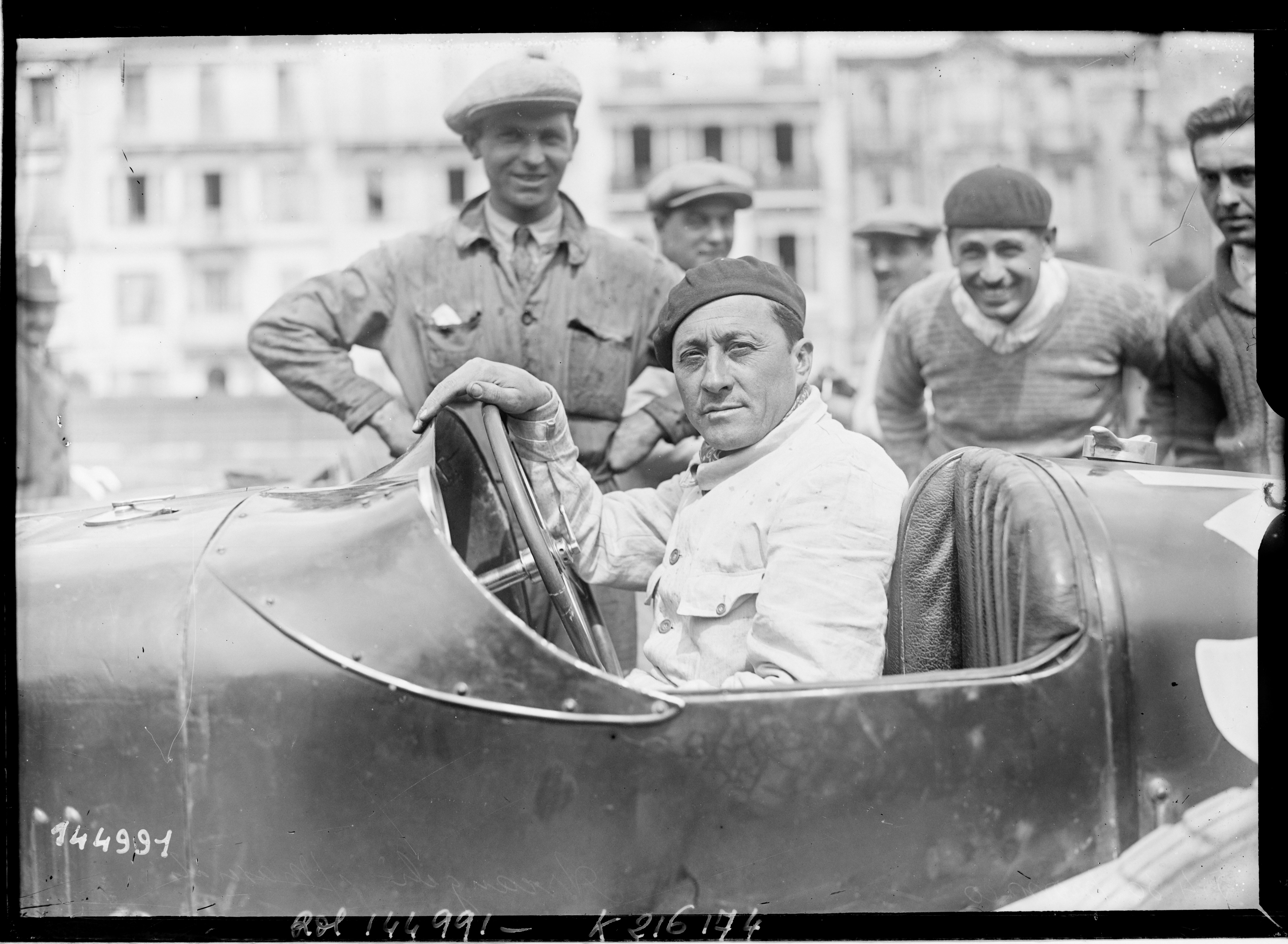
At the 1930 Monaco Grand Prix

"Gigione" Arcangeli was born at Forlì in 1902.

A factory rider for Sarolea, Sunbeam, Bianchi and Moto Guzzi, Arcangeli turned to four wheels in the wake of his friend Tazio Nuvolari. His first appearance was a win in 1928 at the Circuito di Senigallia with a 2-litre Bugatti. After Bugatti he drove Talbot-Darracqs, winning at Cremona in 1928, continuing with Maserati Tipo 8C-2500, with a first place at the Rome Grand Prix in 1930. He later moved to Alfa Romeo and joined Enzo Ferrari's scuderia with Nuvolari as team mate.

== Death ==
Arcangeli was killed in testing at Monza on 23 May 1931, driving a newly-configured Alfa Romeo Tipo A with twin engines, when he lost control and was thrown into a tree; the car was barely damaged. A Scuderia Luigi Arcangeli was created to honor Luigi Arcangeli name. The Scuderia is active nowadays, building ArcangeliMoto regolarità race bikes in limited numbers.
