= 1929 French Grand Prix =

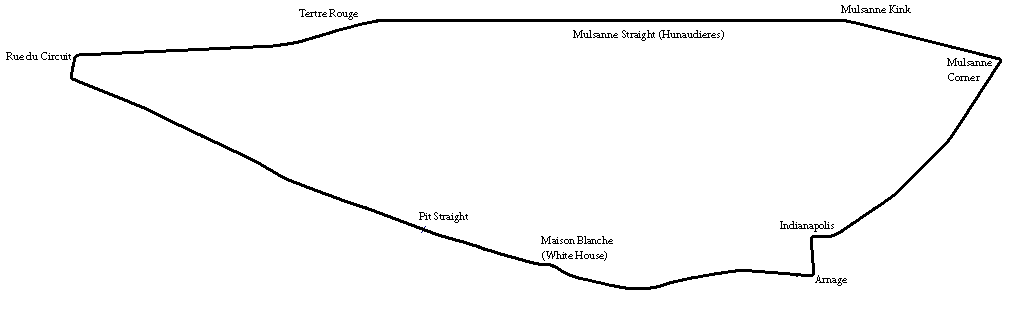

Race details
- Date: 30 June 1929
- Official name: XXIII Grand Prix de l'ACF
- Location: Le Mans; Le Mans, France
- Course: Road course
- Course length: 16.34 km (10.15 miles)
- Distance: 37 laps, 604.58 km (375.67 miles)

Pole position
Driver	(France) Raoul De Rovin	Bugatti
- Grid positions set by ballot

Fastest lap
Driver	(United Kingdom) "W. Williams"	Bugatti
- Time: 7:01

Podium
First	(United Kingdom) "W. Williams"	Bugatti
Second	(France) André Boillot	Peugeot
Third	(Italy) Caberto Conelli	Bugatti

The 1929 French Grand Prix (formally, the XXIII Grand Prix de l'Automobile Club de France) was a Grand Prix motor race held at Le Mans on 30 June 1929. The race was held over 37 laps of the 16.34 km (10.15 miles) circuit for a total race distance of 604.58 km (375.67 miles) and was won by "W. Williams," driving a Bugatti.

Noting that the previous old 1.5 Litre formula had been a failure, with very low entries at most races in 1926 and 1927, and with the French Grand Prix run for sports cars in 1928, it was decided that new regulations were needed. For 1929 there was no-longer an engine capacity limit, but as the AIACR, it was decided to require cars to weigh at least 900kg, and allow them to consume no more than 85kg of fuel (14kg per 100km), which was provided in special fuel tanks, which each car carried externally. The race was totally dominated by Williams, who lead from start to finish.

== Starting Grid: Positions drawn ==
Grid	Driver	Grid	Driver
1	Raoul de Rovin	2	Jean Chassagne
3	Robert Gauthier	4	Besaucele
5	Robert Senechal	6	Albert Divo
7	"Philippe"	8	Andre Boillot
9	Caberto Conelli	10	Guy Bouriat
11	"W.Williams"		

== Classification ==
Pos	No	Driver	Car	Laps	Time/Retire
1	36	(United Kingdom) "W. Williams"	Bugatti T35B	37	4:33:01.2
2	28	(France) André Boillot	Peugeot 174S	37	4:34:20.0
3	30	(Italy) Caberto Conelli	Bugatti T35C	37	4:34:28.0
4	12	(France) Albert Divo	Bugatti T35B	37	4:41:27.4
5	10	(France) Robert Senechal	Bugatti T35B	37	4:58:27.8
6	6	(France) Robert Gauthier	Bugatti T35C	37	5:18:38.4
NC	8	(France) Besaucele	Ballot 2LS	?	
NC	34	(France) Guy Bouriat	Peugeot 174S	?	
Ret	16	(France) "Philippe"	Bugatti T35C	30	Mechanical
Ret	2	(France) Raoul de Rovin	Bugatti T35B	28	Mechanical
Ret	4	(France) Jean Chassagne	Ballot RH2	8	Mechanical
DNS	14	Prince Ghica	FAR		Did not start
DNS	18	Jules Nandillon	Vernandi		Did not start
DNS	20	André Dubonnet	Bugatti T35C		Did not start
DNS	22	?	BNC 527 SCAP		Did not start
DNS	24	Edouard Brisson	Alphi CIME		Did not start
DNS	26	Robert Laly	Ariès		Did not start
DNS	32	?	Ariès		Did not start

Fastest Lap: "W.Williams", 7m01.0 (139.72 km/h)

Grand Prix Race
Previous race: 1929 Indianapolis 500	1929 Grand Prix season Grandes Épreuves	Next race: 1930 Indianapolis 500
Previous race: 1928 French Grand Prix	French Grand Prix	Next race: 1930 French Grand Prix
