= 1930 French Grand Prix =

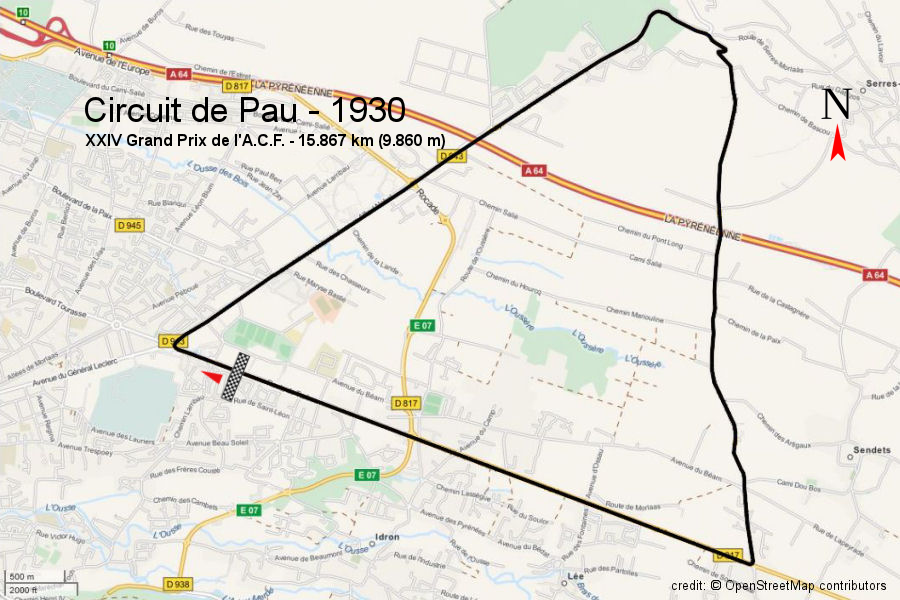

Race details
- Date: 21 September 1930
- Official name: XXIV Grand Prix de l'A.C.F.
- Location: Pau, Pyrénées-Atlantiques
- Course: Road course
- Course length: 15.867 km (9.860 miles)
- Distance: 25 laps, 396.6 km (246.5 miles)

Pole position
Driver	(France) Louis Casali	La Perle
- Grid positions set by ballot

Fastest lap
Driver	(United Kingdom) William Grover-Williams	Bugatti
- Time: 6:10

Podium
First	(France) Philippe Étancelin	Bugatti
Second	(United Kingdom) Tim Birkin	Bentley
Third	(Chile) Juan Zanelli	Bugatti

The 1930 French Grand Prix (formally titled the XXIV Grand Prix de l'A.C.F.) was a Grand Prix motor race held at Pau on 21 September 1930. The race was held over 25 laps of a 15.835 km circuit for a total race distance of 395.875 km and was won by Philippe Étancelin driving a Bugatti. The race was notable for the fact that Tim Birkin came second in a 4.5 litre supercharged Bentley, which was a stripped-down road car.

Pau had some Grand Prix traditions, as the town held the honour of arranging the first race ever to be called a Grand Prix back in 1901. For the 1930 Grand Prix a triangular, Le Mans-type track outside the city was selected. Known as the Circuit de Morlaas it should not be confused with the well-known street track in the Parc Beaumont. The French had hoped to run the race to the International Formula, but when the response was poor the event was postponed and changed to a Formula Libre event instead. The new date meant that the Italian teams were unable to attend, leaving it to be mostly an internal French affair with sixteen Bugattis, two Peugeots and a Delage among the twenty five starters. Among the top Bugatti drivers were Louis Chiron, Marcel Lehoux, Count Stanislas Czaikowski, Jean-Pierre Wimille, Philippe Étancelin and William Grover-Williams.

A curiosity in the largely single-seat entry list was Tim Birkin's 4½-litre supercharged "Blower Bentley" touring car, stripped down to racing trim, with headlights and mudguards removed. The race distance was twenty five laps of the 15.8 km track, making a total of 396 km. Guy Bouriat took an early lead, followed by Williams, Zanelli, Czaikowski and Étancelin, with Birkin as first non-Bugatti driver, in sixth place. Williams in a works Bugatti then became the next leader. Czaikowski fell back through the field and Bouriat in the other works Bugatti made a pitstop giving over the car to Chiron. Then Williams also had to make a stop for a new wheel. That all made way for Étancelin to advance and he was followed by Birkin, the track with its long straights suiting the supercharged Bentley perfectly.

At one-third distance Chiron led, followed by Étancelin, Williams and Birkin. Birkin's fourth place became a third as Williams got engine troubles but then Zanelli, who had made an early stop, came rushing through the field pushing Birkin back to fourth. At lap ten "Sabipa" crashed and was thrown out of his Bugatti, Birkin only avoiding the injured driver by the slightest of margins. After eleven laps Chiron encountered problems with oil pressure and Étancelin took over the lead. Soon Chiron was also passed by Zanelli and Birkin. The Bentley driver used his horn to warn the Bugatti to move over, surely a unique occurrence in Grand Prix racing! With seven laps to go Zanelli made another pitstop and Birkin was up into second place. While Étancelin, with a 2.5 minute lead, nursed his Bugatti home to take victory, Zanelli had not given up and was catching Birkin fast. At the flag the margin was down to fourteen seconds but it was enough for the British Bentley driver to make Grand Prix history, as this was the only occasion on which the iconic 4½-litre "Blower Bentley" was raced with any success. (It was the normally-aspirated 4½-litre and "Speed Six" models which had swept the board at Le Mans for the previous three years).

== Starting Grid (3-3) ==
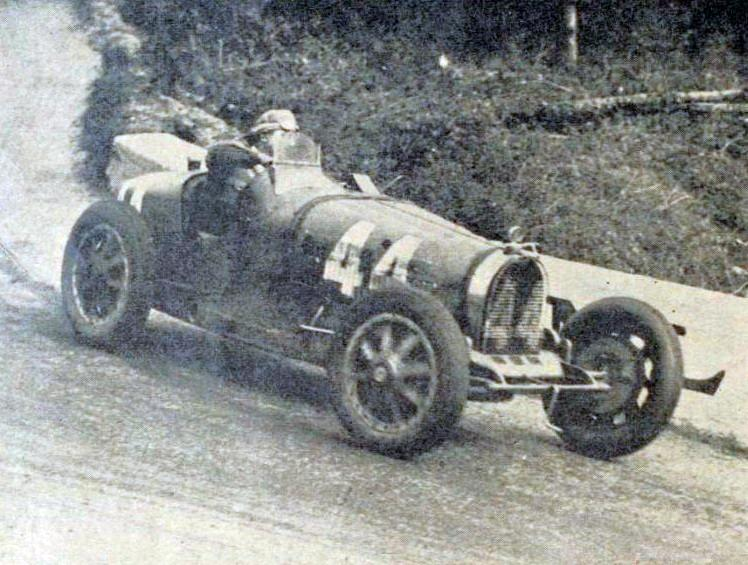
Philippe Étancelin won the race driving a Bugatti T35C

Grid	Driver
1	(France) Louis Casali
2	(Poland) Stanislas Czaykowski
3	(France) Marcel Lehoux
4	(France) Guy Bouriat
5	(France) Jean-Pierre Wimille
6	(United Kingdom) Tim Birkin
7	Robert Senechal
8	(Italy) Grimaldi
9	(France) Jean de Maleplane
10	(France) Charles Montier
11	(Chile) Juan Zanelli
12	(France) Albert de Bondeli
13	(France) Jean de l'Espee
14	(France) Sabipa
15	(France) G.Daniel
16	(France) Philippe Étancelin
17	(France) Henri Stoffel
18	(France) George Delaroche
19	(France) Jean Gaupillat
20	(United Kingdom) "Williams"
21	(France) J.Lumachi
22	(France) Ferdinand Montier
23	(France) Max Fourny
24	(France) Robert Laly
25	(France) René Ferrand

== Classifications ==
Pos	No	Driver	Car	Laps	Time/retire
1	44	(France) Philippe Étancelin	Bugatti T35C	25	2h43m18.4
2	18	(United Kingdom) Tim Birkin	Bentley 4.5 SC	25	2h46m44.6
3	32	(Chile) Juan Zanelli	Bugatti T35B	25	2h46m58.8
4	6	(Poland) Stanislas Czaykowski	Bugatti T35C	25	2h51m27.0
5	38	(France) Jean de l'Espee	Bugatti T35C	25	2h54m28.8
6	20	(France) Robert Senechal	Delage 15-S8	25	2h56m28.6
7	28	(France) Jean de Maleplane	Bugatti T35C	25	3h00m58.0
8	48	(France) Henri Stoffel	Peugeot 174S	25	3h01m06.2
9	74	(France) René Ferrand	Peugeot 174S	25	3h09m08.4
10	72	(France) Robert Laly	Ariès	25	3h21m19.2
11	14	(France) Guy Bouriat (laps 1–11) (Monaco) Louis Chiron (laps 12–24)	Bugatti T35B	24	Engine
NC	22	(Italy) Grimaldi	Bugatti T35C	21	+4 laps
NC	66	(France) Ferdinand Montier	Montier Ford	21	+4 laps
NC	4	(France) Louis Casali	La Perle	19	+6 laps
Ret	42	(France) G.Daniel	Bugatti T35B	16	Did not finish
Ret	36	(France) Albert de Bondeli	Bugatti T37A	15	Did not finish
Ret	58	(United Kingdom) "Williams"	Bugatti T35C	12	Engine
Ret	40	(France) Sabipa	Bugatti T35C	10	Crash
Ret	54	(France) Jean Gaupillat	Bugatti T37A	7	Did not finish
Ret	30	(France) Charles Montier	Montier Ford	4	Did not finish
Ret	64	(France) J.Lumachi	Bugatti T35B	3	Engine
Ret	16	(France) Jean-Pierre Wimille	Bugatti T37A	2	Supercharger
Ret	68	(France) Max Fourny	Bugatti T35C	2	Engine
Ret	52	(France) Georges Delaroche	Bugatti T35C	2	Engine
Ret	10	(France) Marcel Lehoux	Bugatti T35B	0	Gearbox
DNA	2	(France) Jean Poniato	Alphi CIME		Did not appear
DNA	8	(United States) Babe Stapp	Duesenberg A		Did not appear
DNA	12	(Romania) Georges Bouriano	Bugatti T35B		Did not appear
DNA	24	(France) Claude Arthez	Bugatti T35		Did not appear
DNA	26	(France) Lenart	Bugatti T35		Did not appear
DNA	34	(France) Albert Divo	Bugatti T35		Did not appear
DNA	46	(France) René Dreyfus	Bugatti T35B		Did not appear
DNA	50	(France) Etienne Lepicard	Donnet		Did not appear
DNA	56	(France) Jose Scaron	Amilcar C6		Did not appear
DNS	60	(France) Arthur Duray	Amilcar C6		Driver injured
DNA	62	(France) Rodansky	Bugatti T35		Did not appear

Fastest Lap: "W.Williams", 6m10.0 (154.070 km/h)

Note – Chiron drove car 14 for laps 12-24.

Grand Prix Race
Previous race: 1930 Belgian Grand Prix	1930 Grand Prix season Grandes Épreuves	Next race: 1931 Italian Grand Prix
Previous race: 1929 French Grand Prix	French Grand Prix	Next race: 1931 French Grand Prix
