= Louis Rigal =

French racing driver (1895–1953)

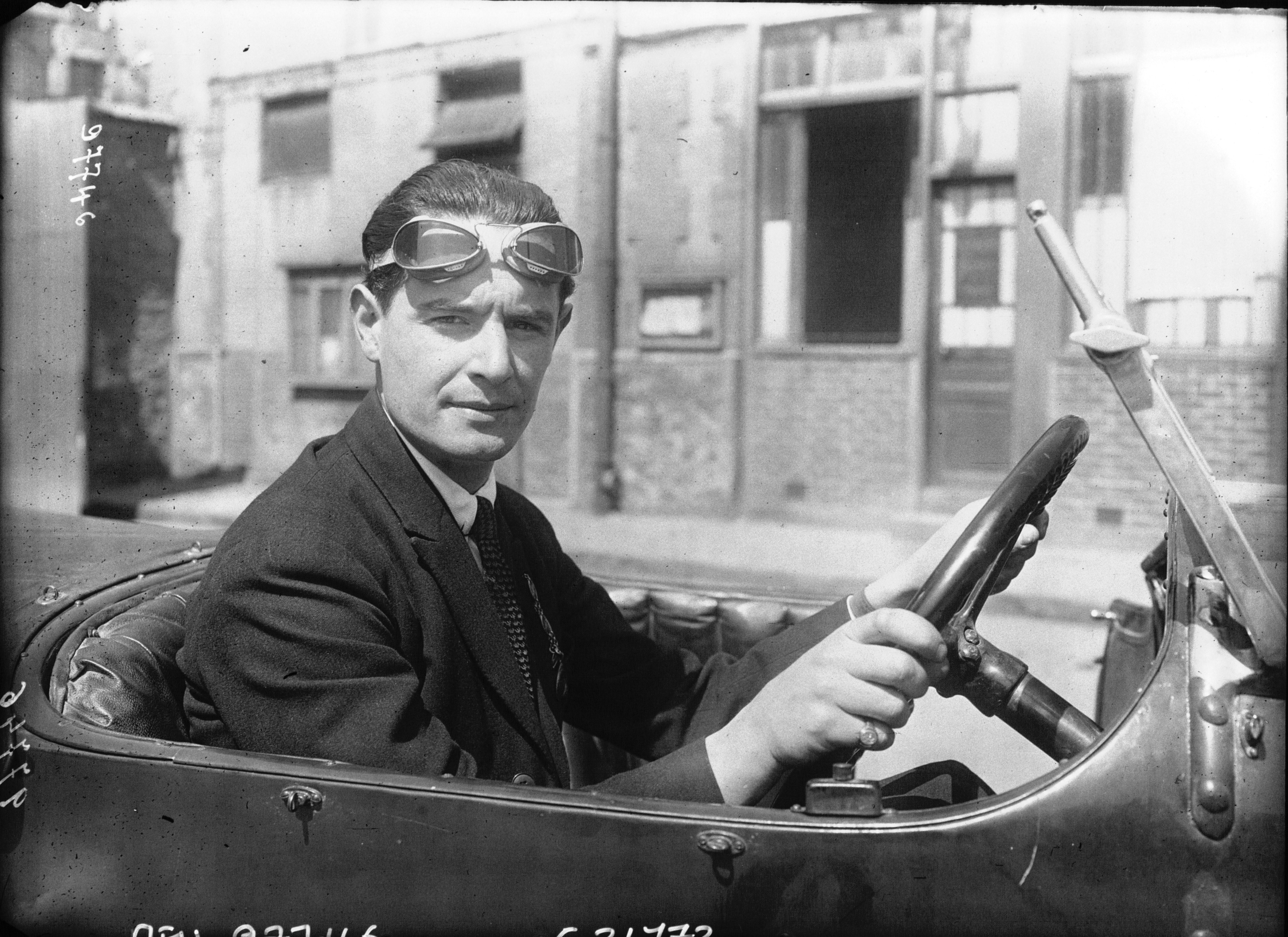
- In a Panhard-Levassor, 1922
- Born: Louis Charles Taillandier; 30 May 1895 Paris, France
- Died: 12 August 1953 (aged 66) Paris

Louis Charles Taillendier, who raced under the name Louis Rigal (30 May 1895 – 12 August 1953), was a French racing driver active before the Second World War.

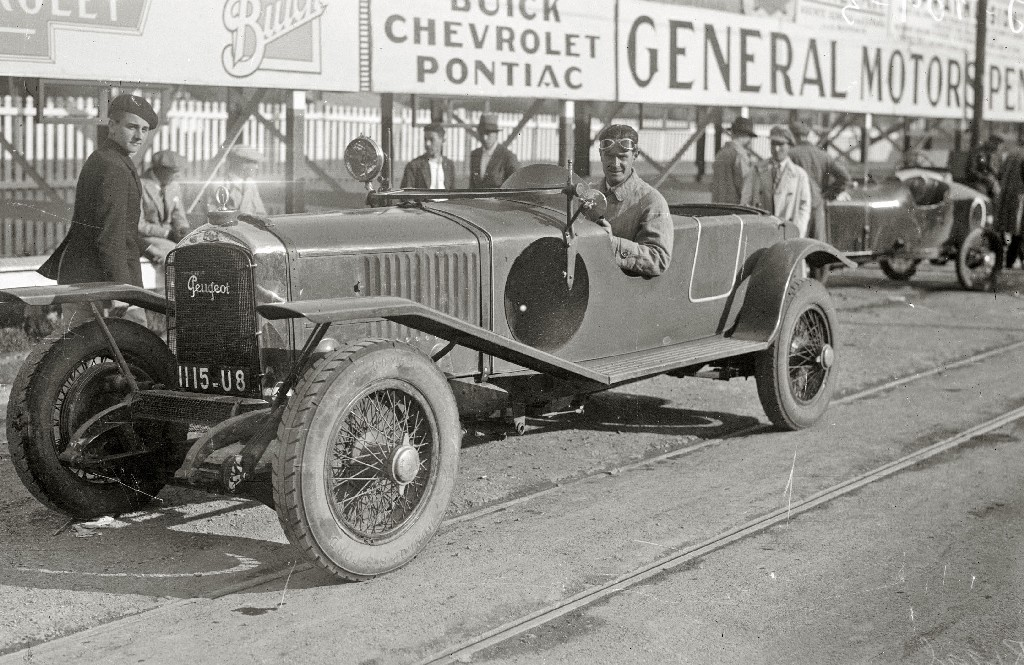
With his Peugeot 174 S at the Spanish Touring Car GP at San Sebastian on 22 July 1926; Rigal would finish 5th

== Career ==
Rigal was the half-brother of Victor Rigal and raced using the Rigal surname. His first involvement in racing came with Peugeot as a race mechanic just before the First World War, and he started sportscar racing after the war in a Panhard-Levassor, before switching to an Ariès.

During 1924, he joined Peugeot and drove the entire 12 hours of the Gran Premio Turismo Guipuzcoa at San Sebastian in a Peugeot Type 174, finishing 2nd. In the same model, Rigal finished third in the A.C.F. Touring Car Grand Prix held at Linas-Montlhéry in 1925, and won the 1926 Spa 24 Hours with André Boillot in a 174S. He also took part in the 1925 Targa Florio for the marque but retired. With the Coppa Florio having a one-off appearance in France in 1927, at Saint-Brieuc in Brittany, Rigal took part for Peugeot, and finished 3rd in the race (2nd in class).

In 1929, Rigal bought an Alfa Romeo 6C and made his Grand Prix debut in the first-ever Monaco Grand Prix in an Alfa Romeo 6C, being flagged off while running 9th and last of the finishers, 13 laps down, thanks to a late problem which dropped him from 10 minutes off the lead to nearly an hour. His only other Grand Prix came during the 10-hour formula, at the 1931 French Grand Prix; he shared René Ferrand's Peugeot 174S to 9th place.

Rigal's greatest success in single seaters was winning the voiturette class in his 6C at the 1929 Grand Prix d'Antibes, in finishing 2nd overall. His strength was as a sports/touring car racer, and he recorded with another podium finish at the Spa 24 Hours in 1931, finishing 3rd with Goffredo Zehender as part of an Alfa 1–2–3; the pair also won the 1930 San Sebastian 12 hours. However he never had much luck in the 24 Hours of Le Mans, his best result being a 10th in 1937 with "Danniel" in a Darl'mat-bodied Peugeot. His Peugeot 174S, shared with André Boillot, was running second at midnight in the 1926 event but a windscreen strut broke, and the scrutineers insisted that the windscreen be replaced by using a spare on the car, which, unsurprisingly, it lacked. After five hours of argument the car was disqualified.

Rigal died in 1953, from the after-effects of surgery.

== Le Mans results ==
Year	Team	Co-Drivers	Car	Class	Laps	Pos.	Class Pos.
1924	(France) Société des Automobile Ariès	(France) Roger Delano	Ariès 8–10CV	1.1	89	13th	3rd
1925	(France) Société des Automobile Ariès	(France) Pierre Lalaurie	Ariès 8–10CV	1.1	35	ret	ret
1926	(France) Société des Automobile Peugeot	(France) André Boillot	Peugeot 174S	5.0	82	DSQ	DSQ
1928	(France) Société des Automobile Ariès	(France) Robert Laly	Ariès Surbaissée	3.0	3	ret	ret
1930	(France) Edouard Brisson	(France) Edouard Brisson	Stutz DV 32	8.0	34	ret	ret
1937	(France) Emile Darl'mat	(France) Daniel Porthault ("Danniell")	Darl'mat 302 DS	2.0	198	10th	5th
1938	(France) Emile Darl'mat	(France) Jean Pujol	Darl'mat 402 DS	2.0	34	ret	ret
