= 1928 French Grand Prix =

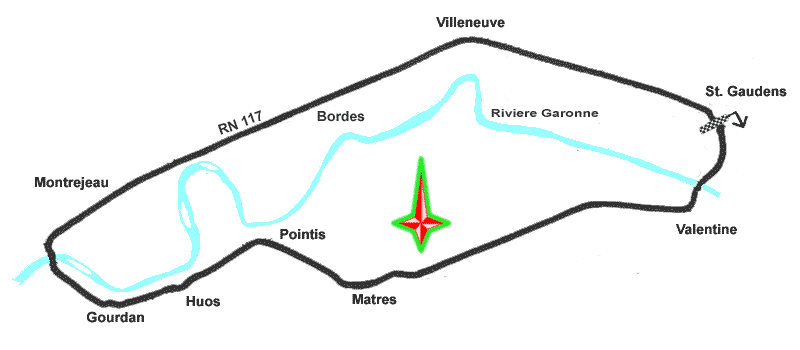
The Track map of Saint-Gaudens Circuit (1925–1932)

The 1928 French Grand Prix (formally the XXII Grand Prix de l'A.C.F.) was a Grand Prix motor race held at Saint-Gaudens on 1 July 1928. The race was held over 10 laps of a 27.664 km (17.190 mi) course for a total distance of 276.64 km (171.90 mi). This is the same circuit used for the Grand Prix du Comminges. The race was won by William Grover-Williams driving a Bugatti. Due to a lack of entries in 1926 and 1927 it was decided that the race should be held for sports cars.

Four 10 lap heats were held to determine the starters of the final. The final was run as a handicap race of 10 laps, with handicaps determined by the heats. The eventual winner William Grover-Williams was the last to start, 32 minutes and 8 seconds after the first group of cars was released.

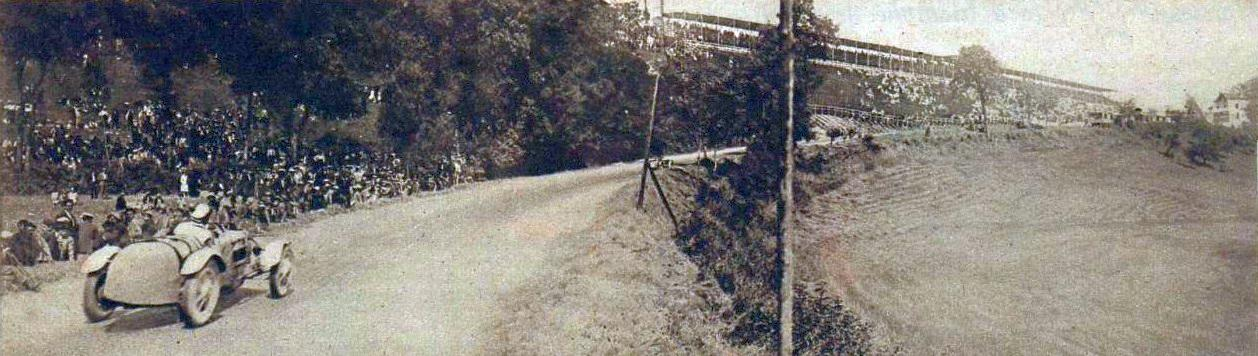
William Grover-Williams winning the main race in his Bugatti

== Classification ==
Pos	No	Driver	Car	Laps	Time/Retire	Handicap
1	48	(United Kingdom) William Grover-Williams	Bugatti	10	2h27min40.8	Scratch
2	92	(France) Andre Rousseau	Salmson	10	2hr30min04.6	32min08
3	14	(France) Edouard Brisson	Stutz	10	2hr31min13.4	10min36
4	82	(France) Lucien Desvaux	Lombard	10	2hr31min28.4	32min08
5	76	(France) Georges Casse	Salmson	10	2hr38min36.0	14min00
6	6	(France) Henri Stoffel	Chrysler	10	2hr40min14.0	10min36
7	2	(France) Cyril de Vere	Chrysler	10	2hr41min58.0	10min36
8	90	(France) Christopher Guy	Lombard	10	2hr42min51.8	32min08
DNF	42	(France) Guy Drouet	Bugatti	?		22min08
DNF	54	(France) "Sabipa" (Louis Charavel)	Bugatti	?		23min38
DNF	80	(France) Louis Rigal	Ariès	?		32min08

Fastest lap: William Grover-Williams, 10min48 (138.6 km/h)

Grand Prix Race
1928 Grand Prix season
Previous race: 1927 French Grand Prix	French Grand Prix	Next race: 1929 French Grand Prix
