= Coppa Florio =

Former motorsport race in Italy

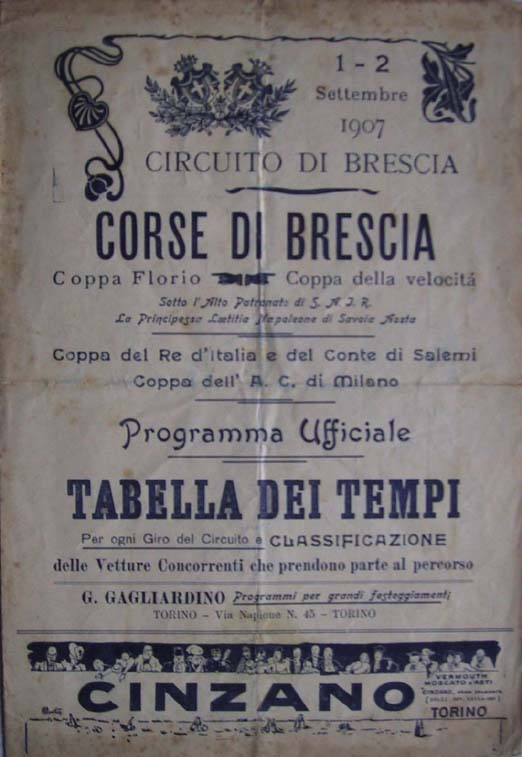
1907 poster showing the Coppa Florio on 1 September and Coppa di Velocità on 2 September.

The Coppa Florio (or Florio Cup) was a motorsport race for automobiles first held in Italy in 1900. It was renamed in 1905 when Vincenzo Florio offered the initial 50,000 Lira prize money and a cup designed by Polak of Paris. From 1906 onwards, Florio also organised the Targa Florio in the Madonie mountains of Sicily, with the trophy being a shield or plate (targa).

The cup was to be awarded to the car maker who gained the most wins in the first seven races, beginning with the race held in 1905. In the event, the first seven races were all won by different manufacturers, but Peugeot won the eighth race in 1925 and thus secured the cup with its second win. However, the competition for the cup continued after Lucien Rosengart, then a director of Peugeot, offered to make it available again.

The Brescia race ran along the route Brescia-Cremona-Mantua-Brescia. In 1908, the race used the Circuito di Bologna: Bologna-Castelfranco Emilia-Sant'Agata Bolognese-San Giovanni in Persiceto-Bologna. After 1914, most of the Coppa Florio races were co-organized with the Targa Florio at the Circuito delle Madonie circuit outside Palermo, Sicily, running four or five laps, 108 km each. Only in 1927 did the race move to Saint-Brieuc, in honour of Peugeot's second win in 1925. The race attracted teams from around Europe as well as the 1921 Grand Prix Sunbeams from England and was an opportunity to see Sir Henry Segrave and Jean Chassagne competing. The winners were:

== Past winners ==
Edition	Date	Circuit	Winner	Vehicle	Time
--	10 September 1900	Brescia	(Italy) Alberto Franchetti	Panhard & Levassor 12 HP	n/a
--	5 September 1904	Brescia	(Italy) Vincenzo Lancia	Fiat 75 HP	2*167 km=372.2 km in 3h12m
I	4 September 1905	Brescia	(Italy) Giovanni Battista Raggio	Itala 112 HP	3*167 km=500.7 km in 4h46m
II	1 September 1907	Brescia	(Italy) Ferdinando Minoia	Isotta Fraschini	8*60 km=485.7 km in 4h39m
III	6 September 1908	Bologna	(Italy) Felice Nazzaro	Fiat	10*52 km=528.1 km in 4h25m
IV	31 May 1914	Madonie	(Italy) Felice Nazzaro	Nazzaro	3*148 km=446.5 km in 8h11m
V	4 September 1921	Brescia	(France) Jules Goux	Ballot 3L	519 km in 3h35m
VI	19 November 1922	Madonie	(France) André Boillot	Peugeot	432 km in 7h09m
VII	27 April 1924	Madonie	(Germany) Christian Werner	Mercedes-Benz TF	432 km in 6h32m
VIII	3 May 1925	Madonie	(France) André Boillot	Peugeot	432 km in 6h04m
IX	25 April 1926	Madonie	(Italy) Bartolomeo Costantini	Bugatti Type 35T	540 km in 7h20m
X	17 July 1927	Saint-Brieuc	(France) Robert Laly	Ariès	n/a
XI	6 May 1928	Madonie	(France) Albert Divo	Bugatti Type 35B	n/a
XII	5 May 1929	Madonie	(France) Albert Divo	Bugatti Type 35C	n/a

=== Winners of revived race ===
World Sportscar Championship status was held by the Targa Florio in 1955 and from 1958 to 1973. It was reduced to a National event in 1974 and discontinued after 1977.

From 1974, the Coppa Florio name was revived as a sports car race held at the Autodromo di Pergusa in Sicily. The race counted towards the World Sportscar Championship most years from 1975, last being held in 1981. In 2020, the Coppa Florio was again revived at Pergusa, being the fifth round of the 2020 24H GT and TCE Series as the Coppa Florio 12 Hours of Sicily. The race was again confirmed as part of the 24H Series calendar, of 2021, being the seventh round of 8 events scheduled for the 2 and 3 of October, but was later cancelled.

The following is a list of winners of the revived race held at Pergusa:

Year	Winner	Vehicle
1974	(United Kingdom) John Fitzpatrick	Porsche Carrera RSR
1975	(Italy) Arturo Merzario (West Germany) Jochen Mass	Alfa Romeo 33TT12
1976	(West Germany) Rolf Stommelen (West Germany) Jochen Mass	Porsche 936
1977	(Italy) Arturo Merzario	Alfa Romeo 33SC12
1978	(Italy) Gimax (Italy) Giorgio Francia	Osella PA6-BMW
1979	(Italy) Lella Lombardi (Italy) Enrico Grimaldi	Osella PA7-BMW
1980	Not held	
1981	(Spain) Emilio de Villota (United Kingdom) Guy Edwards	Lola T600-Ford
1982 — 2019	Not held	
2020	(Ivory Coast) Frédéric Fatien (South Africa) Jordan Grogor (France) Mathieu Jaminet (Germany) Robert Renauer	Porsche 911 GT3 R
