= Jean de Maleplane =

French racing driver (1907–1978

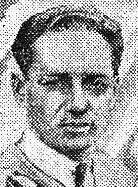
- From Le Matin, 12 September 1931
- Born: Gabriel Paul Marie Jean Veyrier de Maleplane; 12 May 1907 Venette, France
- Died: 22 September 1978 (aged 71) Lyon, France

Gabriel Paul Marie Jean Veyrier de Maleplane, who used the name Jean de Maleplane (12 May 1907 – 22 September 1978), was a French Grand Prix motor racing driver, active between 1925 and 1933.

== Career ==
De Maleplane was from a family of French nobility which held Maleplane Castle in Saint-Leonard-de-Noblat. He started his racing career in 1925, and normally drove in voiturette races, but took part in the San Sebastian Grand Prix in 1927 (finishing 8th in a Buc) and 1930 (finishing 6th in a Bugatti Type 35C), as well as making his one national Grand Prix appearance at the 1930 French Grand Prix, finishing 7th in his 35C.

His greatest success was winning the Oran Grand Prix in 1930, de Maleplane surviving on the bumpy surface when more established stars retired. He sold his 35C in the spring of 1932 having upgraded to a Maserati Tipo 26M, but enjoyed less success. He moved to Casablanca in Morocco in 1933, as a representative of an oil company, and was forced to stop racing after a serious car accident, although he did become a member of the Automobile Club Marocain.
