= Robert Laly =

French racing driver (1887–1972)

- At the 12 Hours of Gipuzkoa in 1925
- Born: Charles Robert Laly; 7 September 1887 Paris
- Died: 13 December 1972 (aged 85) Levallois, France

Charles Robert Laly (7 September 1887 – 13 December 1972) was a French racing driver.

== Riding mechanic ==
In 1902, he undertook paid work at the age of 17 with the engine manufacturers Lacoste & Battmann (based in Levallois-Perret, his own district), where he made an early acquaintance of René Thomas. He began as a mechanic on board from 1905 to 1907 with Philippe Barriaux for Vulpes, before undertaking military service, and later rode mechanic with the Alcyon, Peugeot, and Martini marques. Approached during the 1913 Tour de France Automobile by Thomas, he sat as riding mechanic for Thomas in his win in the 1914 Indianapolis 500 in a Delage, and after the First World War fulfilled the same role for Ballot - again teaming with Thomas at the 1919 Indianapolis 500 - and Sunbeam, helping Jean Chassagne (for whom he had ridden mechanic at the 1921 Italian Grand Prix, when Chassagne was with Ballot) to win the 1922 RAC Tourist Trophy.

== Racing driver ==
At the 1925 San Sebastian Grand Prix

Laly had made his debut behind the wheel at the 1907 Coupe des Voiturettes at Rambouillet, in a Vulpès, but, having finished 14th while Barriaux finished 20th, he was demoted back to riding mechanic. He finally became a full-time driver in 1924 for the Ariès marque, in sportscar and touring car races, and enjoyed an early success by winning the 1924 Spanish Touring Car Grand Prix at San Sebastian, followed up with winning the 1926 Circuit des Routes Pavées.

He took part in the 24 Hours of Le Mans every year from 1924 to 1928 with Ariès, but never saw the chequered flag. He set a lap record in the 1926 race but the otherwise healthy car had to be retired because the battery ran flat and would not turn the engine over after a pit-stop, and using the starting handle was forbidden; in 1927, he and Jean Chassagne led the race from Saturday evening to a mere 90 minutes before the end, when an engine problem halted the car terminally. Laly at least had some consolation in winning the Coppa Florio - he finished 4th on distance, but the prize went to the class winner with the most regular set of laps, and after some careful calculations Laly (who had won the 3 litre class) took the Cup.

Laly's last race was the 1930 French Grand Prix, which was run to a Formule Libre regulation, so he entered a private Ariès; he finished 10th and last. His only other Grand Prix - the 1928 Spanish Grand Prix - was run to a sportscar formula, Laly finishing 5th.

== Le Mans results ==
Year	Team	Co-Drivers	Car	Class	Laps	Pos.	Class Pos.
1924	(France) Société des Automobile Ariès	(France) Charles Flohot	Ariès	5.0	64	ret	ret
1925	(France) Société des Automobile Ariès	(Belgium) Arthur Duray	Ariès	3.0	42	ret	ret
1926	(France) Société des Automobile Ariès	(France) Jean Chassagne	Ariès Surbaissée	2.0	65	ret	ret
1927	(France) Société des Automobile Ariès	(France) Jean Chassagne	Ariès Surbaissée	3.0	122	ret	ret
1928	(France) Société des Automobile Ariès	(France) Louis Rigal	Ariès Surbaissée	3.0	3	ret	ret

== Full results ==
- Racing Years
