= Vernandi =

- Founded: 1928; 98 years ago
- Defunct: 1929; 97 years ago
- Headquarters: Garches, France
- Products: Automobile

The Vernandi was a short-lived French automobile.

The car made its first appearance at a hillclimbing event at Gaillon in the late summer of 1928. A few weeks later Vernandi took a stand at the 22nd Paris Motor Show and exhibited their V8 engined 1494cc racing car: the engine had overhead valves and according to some sources was fitted with one or possibly two superchargers. The car was the result of a design by an engineer called Causan who was responsible for a number of mechanically advanced designs during these years, provided for automakers such as Bignan and La Licorne.

Only one Vernandi was built, although there were plans for a second 2.9-litre engined V 16 engined car.

The Vernandi name was seen again at the end of June 1929 when the car was scheduled to participate in the French Grand Prix at Le Mans. However, the 1929 Grand Prix was noteworthy for the number of cars that did not start, and the Vernandi driven by Jules Nandillon was one of these seven "non-runners".
