= Sunbeam Grand Prix (1921) =

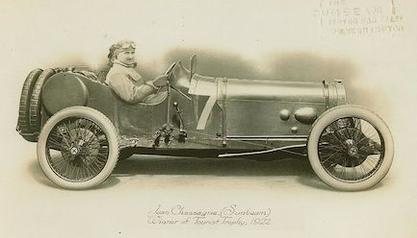
The 1922 Tourist Trophy-winning Sunbeam

The 1921 S.T.D. 'Works' Grand Prix chassis was built to the three-litre and minimum weight of 800 kilogrammes formula for that year's Indianapolis 500 and French Grand Prix de l’A.C.F. These team cars were modified by the Sunbeam Experimental department in Wolverhampton for the 1922 Isle of Man Tourist Trophy, which was won by one of the cars. A few months later, and with 1916 4.9-litre engines, two of the T.T. cars competed in the Coppa Florio, Sicily and gained second and fourth position.

The cars also participated in local events including Brooklands and hillclimbs. They are notable for obtaining the first significant international motor-racing success for Britain after the Great War and having "the best run of success by any Brooklands' car in such a period". Of the five constructed, four survive: one as a single-seater, two as standard T.T. and one as a resurrected T.T.

== Background ==
Sunbeam emerged from the Great War well poised to amalgamate with two other firms. Together with Talbot and Darracq they formed the S.T.D. Combine. S.T.D. was to become a dominant player in Land Speed Records, Grand Prix and Voiturette racing both in Britain and abroad. S.T.D. race cars using identical chassis and engines were to be designated variously as Sunbeam, Talbot or Talbot Darracq in response to the different events or countries they took part in. These zero tolerance racing cars were milled, as it were, from solid billet. Racing program was extensive; tailor-made alternative lightweight bodies, specific axle ratios and engines to suit each event were formed. The driving force behind the S.T.D. and its racing program was the charismatic and ingenious Breton Louis Coatalen. Designer, engineer and racer Coatalen was inspired by the belief that "Racing improves the breed".

Whilst catapulting S.T.D. to the highest echelons of the sport, the costly racing policy may have ultimately led to the demise of the S.T.D. Combine. Its subsequent merger with the Rootes Group did not help matters. Conversely it may be that S.T.D.'s loss of direction and withdrawal from racing in the late Vintage period was the real source of their demise.

During its pre 1930s heyday S.T.D. was consistently and fully committed to international racing at the highest level and was synonymous with British Racing.

== Design ==
1920 November 3, S.T.D. Experimental Department Order EXP.273 (4 nos. Grand Prix Chassis) and EXP. 271 (7 nos. straight-eight-cylinder engines). Project cost £50,000 (about £5,000,000 in 2010). These were the first new post Great War Grand Prix chassis to be constructed by S.T.D.

Designed by the S.T.D. Experimental Department possibly in both Wolverhampton and Sureness, the highly advanced 1921 straight-eight engine is unmistakably influenced by Ernest Henry's pre-war work for Peugeot and his immediate post-war work for Ballot where the resemblance is particularly noticeable.

The flexible chassis, was likewise the latest in design and benefited from Louis Coatalen's understanding. Presaging the future of racing, these were the first British racing cars ever to be fitted with brakes on all four wheels.

These 1921 Grand Prix chassis were amenable to changes of both engine and body. Two engines were used in competitions; the 1921 3-litre straight-eight dohc and the 1916 4.9-litre. Body types included two-seaters and single-seater with pointed tails, slanted tails or exposed fuel tank. Bonnets were adjusted according to the type of carburettors and engines used. In addition, radiators and badges of the three firms constituting S.T.D. were interchangeable. The Works selected the most appropriate combination of body, engine and radiator for each speed event. The cockpit arrangement as well as car dimensions were arranged according to each pilot's specific requirements; resulting in tailor-made cars for the Works team drivers.

The chassis in all these permutations is the same and can be called the 1921 G.P. chassis. Body type can be called G.P. type (pointed & slanted tails) and T.T. type (exposed tank).

=== Colour/trim ===
Body:

1921 French G.P. Talbot – 'British Racing Green'; Talbot Darracq – blue
1921 Shelsley Walsh – 'British Racing Green'
1922 IoM T.T. 'Sunbeam Dreadnought Grey'
1922 Coppa Florio 'Sunbeam Dreadnought Grey'

Wheels: Black
Upholstery: Sprung squab with fluted seat back in embossed veg-tan leather

=== Chassis ===
Frame is upswept over front and back axles to achieve lower centre of gravity. Underslung front and rear axles machined from solid billet (back axle to 3mm thickness). Front axle H-section. U- shape sub-frame carries the engine, clutch and gearbox and mounted on the chassis at three points. Alignment of front end of crankshaft is below the centre line of the rear axle; as such the line of crankshaft, the transmission and the propeller shaft slopes downwards towards front in order to keep centre of gravity as low as possible.

=== Dimensions and weight ===
Chassis dimensions of surviving cars vary indicating specificity in body fitting.

Wheelbase 8 ft 9 in, Track 4 ft 7in
Weight:

1921 Grand Prix de l’A.C.F. – 19.5 cwt
1922 IoM T.T.:

K Lee Guinness – 21 cwt 99 lb
H.O.D. Segrave – 22 cwt 31 lb
J. Chassagne – 22 cwt 10 lb (2,474 lb)

Engine weight dry 520 lb.

=== Engine ===
Two race engine types were used with the 1921 Grand Prix chassis depending on event regulations, a 1921 3-litre straight-eight and a 1916 6-cylinder 4.9-litre.

1921 Indianapolis – 1921 3-litre straight-eight; four horizontal Claudel Hobson
1921 Grand Prix de l’A.C.F – 1921 3-litre straight-eight; four Zenith carburettors

1921 Shelsley Walsh Hillclimb – 1921 3-litre straight-eight.

1922 Isle of Man Tourist Trophy – 1921 3-litre straight-eight (modified and compression raised); two racing CZC vertical Claudel Hobson carburettors
1922 Coppa Florio Sicily – 1916 6-cylinder 4.9-litre.

Brooklands – both engine types
Hillclimbs – both engine types

=== The 1921 3-litre straight-eight ===
Credited to Coatalen the design is an Ernest Henry type straight-eight inline twin overhead camshaft. Bore and stroke 65x112mm, Capacity 2973cc. Lightweight aluminum alloy cylinder blocks and crankcase. Block cast in two blocks of four; non-detachable head cast in one. Shrunk-in steel liners and screwed- in phosphor-bronze valve seats. Crankshaft of nickel-chrome forging, machined from a single billet; plain bearings. Hollow five main journals and eight crankpins. Each crank throw is counterbalanced. No flywheel. Camshaft driven by train of straight-tooth pinions at the front. Rotation viewed from above anti-clockwise both inlet and exhaust. Pistons are aluminium domed- head carrying three compression rings and an oil groove in the skirt serving instead of scraper ring. Piston clearance 0.015’’ to 0.018’’. Groves 1/16’’. Connecting rods H-section, white metal big end bearings. Four tulip-shape overhead valves (twin inlet and twin outlet) per cylinder (32 in total) inclined at 60 degrees operated by two overhead camshafts through inverted cup-style tappets. Valve clearance (cold) inlet 0.010, exhaust 0.015. Valve timing varies between chassis and in time viz. in 1922 open 12 degrees BBDC close 55 degrees ATDC; 1960 – chassis II: inlet opens 5 degrees BTC and closes 35 degrees ABC. Exhaust opens 45 degrees BBC and closes 10 degrees ATC. Compression 1921 French G.P. was 5.7 to 1, increased for the 1922 IoM T.T. to 6.3 to 1. Output 112bhp at a maximum 4,700rpm. (See footnote below.)

=== The 1916 4.9-litre 6-cylinder ===
"Coatalen produced the world's first twin-cam Six for the 1916 Indianapolis 500" an Ernest Henry prewar Peugeot type in-line six cylinder 81.5x157 mm, capacity 4,914 cc. Two cast blocks of three; twin overhead camshafts driven by a vertical shaft and gears from the front of the engine; four valve per cylinder (24 in total), 60 degrees included angle. Camshafts castings split horizontally. Pivoted cam followers carried by bronze mountings. Crankshaft in three pieces carried in four large ball bearings; plain big ends. Drilled aluminum pistons – a first for Sunbeam racing car. Dry sump lubrication with two oil pumps – one for the bearings and the other for the camshafts. Mounted on sub-frame articulated with the chassis. Single Bosch magneto ignition driven at ¾ engine speed. Twin CZS Claudel Hobson carburettors mounted on two water-jacketed induction manifolds. Compression ration 5.8:1, 152 bhp at 3,200 rpm. Two speed gearbox was tried but four speed gearbox with cone clutch generally used; Hotchkiss drive with bevel back axle. Revolution counter driven by the camshaft.

The engines mounted in a 1914 G.P. Sunbeam chassis were entered in 1916 in a number of American events; racing having ceased in Europe during the war but continued in America prior to the US entering the conflict. In the careful hands of J Christiaens who suggested their construction, his car regularly finished 'in the Money' winning large prizes including $3,000 (4th) in that year's Indianapolis 300-Mile. The cars also performed well in the hands of Galvin and Louis Chevrolet achieving a number of third places.

In 1919 the 4.9-litre engines were mounted in two 1914 T.T. Sunbeam chassis; Josef Christiaens was killed demonstrating one of the cars at Wolverhampton and they were subsequently entered at that year's Indianapolis 500 for J Chassagne and Dario Resta. In the event, they were withdrawn without explanation said to be in excess of 300 cubic inch limit.

Mounted in the 1921 Grand Prix Sunbeam chassis this engine proved competitive and effective at Brooklands until 1929 and in Southport well into the thirties; indeed William B. Boddy noted that one of the cars had "the best run of successes by any Brooklands car over such a period". Some of the greatest drivers of the period achieved fine results with the combination of the 4.9 L in a 1921 G.P. chassis including HOD Segrave, Malcolm Campbell and Kaye Don.(See footnote below.)

=== Carburetion (3-litre engine) ===
Various carburettor configurations were used depending on the event, including four horizontal Claudel Hobson (1921 Indianapolis 500), four Zenith carburettors (1921 Grand Prix de l’A.C.F.); however, in the Isle of Man Tourist Trophy two racing CZC vertical Claudel Hobson carburettors 42 choke were used. Claudel Hobson were an S.T.D. Subsidiary. Fabricated inlet manifolds incorporating water jacket to stop icing. Fuel feed by pressure from 30-gallon copper bolster tank at rear was used in the Isle of Man Tourist Trophy and the Coppa Florio; other configurations in other events.

Fuel consumption 7–22 miles per gallon 0.7 pint per bhp/hour at 3,000 rpm, 0.65 pint per bhp/hour at 3,500rpm.

=== Ignition (3-litre engine) ===
Delco coil and distributor with a dynamo on the nearside driven from the timing gears was used for the 1921 Indianapolis 500 and that year's French Grand Prix but two high-tension B.T.H four cylinder magnetos on the offside driven by shaft from the camshaft drive gears were used subsequently from 1922 on. Ignition advanced 45 degrees BTDC. Spark control by Bowden lever mounted on the steering column (on steering wheel for the Grand Prix).

Firing order 1,3,4,2,8,6,5,7 (chassis II:1,8,3,6,4,5,2,7).

=== Transmission (3-litre engine) ===
Separate four forward and one reverse speed gearbox with straight-cut gears. Ratio 1 1.165, 1.725 2.5 to 1.

Hele-Shaw multi-plate clutch with six alternating steel and phosphor-bronze plates running in graphite powder.

Hotchkiss-type drive; open propeller shaft. Bevel driven back axle with alternative ratios. Subtle changes to ratios were made according to the topography of each speed event:

- 1921 – 13.48 for 3.69:1
- 1921 – 14.47 for 3.35:1
- 1922 – 13.49 for 3.76:1.
- 2nd 70 mph, 3rd 90 mph, 4th 108 mph.

=== Lubrication (3-litre engine) ===
Dry sump lubrication employing two gear-type oil pump (pressure and scavenge). Separate five-gallon oil tank under riding mechanic seat. Minimum safe oil pressure 35 lb per square inch.

=== Cooling (3-litre engine) ===
Water pump mounted on the front of the timing gear case delivering into a gallery pipe along the near side of the engine with eight separate feeds into the cylinder block below the exhaust ports.

=== Braking system ===
For the 1921 Indianapolis 500 small rear wheels brakes only were fitted. Subsequently, Isotta Fraschini-type front wheel brakes actuated by hand lever, rear brakes actuated by right pedal.

Brake cables, running over phosphor bronze pulleys, adjustable by ratchets below a sideways hinged 6"x8" trap door in the floor in front of the riding mechanic. Cast steel ribbed brake drums; cast alloy brake shoes; cast iron segments lining.

=== Suspension ===
Underslung semi-elliptical springs (Jonas Woodhead and Sons – S.T.D. subsidiary) all around. Double Hartford shock absorbers fitted at each corner.

=== Steering ===
High-geared laminated spring steel 'Rene Thomas' steering wheel was used. Only one of the surviving Sunbeams is so equipped.

Wheels:

Rudge-Whitworth wire detachable.

Tyres:

1921 Indianapolis 500: straight side tyres front 32x41/2 and 33x3 rear.
1921 French G.P. straight side tyres front 815x105 and 820x120 rear.
1922 IoM T.T. Dunlop traction tread straight side tyres 32x4 front and 32x4.5 rear.

=== Body ===
The lightweight all aluminum body consisted of a bonnet riveted to reinforcing copper and brass straps, scuttle on angled steel, seats tub and tail. Both narrow staggered two-seater and single-seater were constructed by the Works. Sunbeam did not construct new bodies for each event but modified and evolved bodies from one event to another to accommodate change in branding, carburettors, engine type and fuel capacity. The side blisters on the bonnet were modified to accommodate different carburettor configurations; a hatch on scuttle was formed when a 1916 4.9 L engine was used; alternative tails and radiators were used as needed. Flared front offside wing were used during the 1922 IoM T.T. Approximate frontal area without the wing 11 1/2 sq.ft, with wing and riding mechanic 13 1/2 sq.ft.

Body Types used in principle events:

- 1921 Indianapolis 500 –two seater, pointed tail 3l – G.P. Type.
- 1921 French G.P. – two-seater, pointed (Talbot Darracq radiators) and slanted tails 3 L (Talbot radiators) – G.P. Type.
- 1922 IOM T.T. – two-seater, exposed fuel tank, 3 L – T.T. Type.
- 1922 Coppa Florio – two-seater, exposed fuel tank, altered bonnet, 4.9 L – T.T. Type

=== Instruments ===
Instruments varied from car to car in accordance with pilot specifications but also according to engine type used. In the IoM tourist Trophy the following were used: Jaeger rev counter, Sunbeam oil pressure gauge, fuel air pressure, twin magneto switches, twin glass oil restrictors.

== Speed events ==
=== 1921 Indianapolis 500 ===
The 1921 ninth International Sweepstakes Indianapolis 500 was held on 30 May and was attended by 135,000. The 23 strong field was composed of the best of Europe (Ballot, Peugeot, S.T.D.) and America (Dusenberg, Frontenac, Miller). The drivers were equally impressive including Jimmy Murphy, Tom Milton, Roscoe Sarles, Albert Guyot and Jean Chassagne.

Three cars were entered by S.T.D. – two Sunbeams for Rene Thomas (no.17) and Ora Haibe (no.16) and one Talbot Darracq for Andre Boillot (no.11); the three cars were identical but for the shape of the radiator and badge. The S.T.D. team was instructed to save the horses for the French Grand Prix.

Ralph de Palma on a similarly designed Ballot dominated the race at 93 mph for 112 laps when he retired with bearing trouble. For the rest of the race, it was mostly the American Frontenac and Dusenberg which excelled and of only nine cars to finish the 200 laps, eight were American who invariably also won the race with a 1,2,3 win for Frontenac (89.621 mph & 85.025 mph) split by a Dusenberg (88.609 mph).

The talented American Ora Haiba in the Works Sunbeam was the only European car to finish and was placed fifth (84.277 mph) winning a purse of $3,000. The Talbot Darracq suffered big-end failure on 41st lap due to jammed oil pump; Rene Thomas held 4th place until lap 144 when water connection broke.

=== 1921 French Grand Prix de l’A.C.F. ===
The 1921 French Grand Prix de l’A.C.F was the premium international motoring sporting event on the calendar; the 1921 event was the first Grand Prix in seven years, marking the long-awaited return to normality after the Great War. It was held to great fanfare on 25 July. The thirty lap 321.68 mile race was run on the same circuit that was to become famous 1923–1928 as the Le Mans '24 hours Endurance'. The event attracted a strong field of international teams and the latest cars from France, Britain and the US.

S.T.D. envisaged seven entries but only weeks before the event the cars were not ready and an attempt to withdraw was made; this met with resistance from the designated pilots and after considerable effort by the S.T.D. Works at Sureness, four cars were made ready. Three of these were the very cars which only weeks earlier participated in the 1921 Indianapolis 500.

Taking advantage of its international manufacturing base, S.T.D. fitted two cars as Talbot and two as Talbot Darracq – all mechanically identical. The Talbot was distinguished by its colour, the Talbot radiator and a slanted tail mounted diagonally with two spare wheels. The Talbot car were given race no. 10 and no.4 and were designated to newcomer H. O. D. Segrave in his first ever Grand Prix and the experienced K. Lee Guinness, of the eponymous stout dynasty and KLG sparkplugs. Two additional cars were fitted with Talbot-Darracq radiators and pointed tail similar to the configuration used at the Indianapolis 500. The two Talbot Darracq were entered for French aces Rene Thomas (no.5) and Andre Boillot (no.15). All four S.T.D. cars were modified from their Indianapolis configuration and fitted with both front and rear brakes. The competitors were started in pairs at half minute intervals.

Rene Thomas retired on lap 24 after a ricocheted stone holed his oil tank. Andre Boillot drove carefully and his pit-work was methodical and quick; he had to change seven tyres during the race but nevertheless achieved the best S.T.D. result at fifth place. Guinness had to change nine tyres on his Talbot to finish eighth.

The road circuit was badly cut out and covered with large sharp stones one of which knocked Segrave's riding mechanic Jules Moriceau unconscious for the whole of half a lap. The race was to be plagued by tyre problems for S.T.D. as a result of both road condition and insufficiently cured tyre rubber Despite having to change fourteen covers by himself H.O.D. Segrave was still able to average 62.6 mph, finishing in 5:08:06.0 and achieving ninth place. This performance convinced Coatalen to offer Segrave a position in the Sunbeam Works team, which soon took him to extraordinary fame, success and knighthood.

The race was predominantly a struggle between the Ballot and the Dusenberg: Jimmy Murphy who was injured in practice and was nursing fractured ribs throughout the race, winning in the latter for the US – the first such win and the last for 46 years. Ballot took the other podium places with S.T.D. best at fifth place.

=== 1921 Shelsley Walsh ===
The four cars were repatriated to Wolverhampton England; the two Talbot were fitted with Sunbeam radiators and entered at the 1921 September 9 Shelsley Walsh – the premium annual hill-climb in the United Kingdom. The 1921 event is notable as the first time Raymond Mays, still a Cambridge undergraduate, took to the hill in a self tuned Hillman (82.2sec). The event, described in contemporary literature as 'the best yet held', was attended by 5,000 people. Contestants included Count Zborowski of Chitty Bang Bang fame driving H.O.D. Segrave's 1921 G.P no.10 and George H. Day, with Bill Perkins as riding mechanic, in the 1921 G.P. Talbot no. 4.

The full Le Mans Grand Prix road-racing trim, high gears (3.61:1) and no flywheel precluded a fast start, and neither G H Day 4th (62.8sec) nor Count Zborowski 7th (65.8sec) impress that day. However, once the car got its "revs", it was "a delight to watch, and magnificent on the corners, and undoubtedly the crowd was delighted to have the opportunity of seeing these very latest examples of the Grand Prix type –road-racing machine in action in this country". Fastest time of the day was achieved by C.A. Bird with a 1916 Indianapolis 4.9 L Sunbeam (52.2sec).

=== 1922 Isle of Man Tourist Trophy ===
The 1922 R.A.C. Tourist Trophy held on 22 June at 9:30 a.m. was the first in eight years and the last motorcar Tourist Trophy to be contested on the Isle of Man. The formula was consistent with the 1921 Grand Prix and Indianapolis 500 formula for 3 L capacity and 1,600 lbs minimum weight. An 'International 1,500 Trophy' race for voiturettes up to 1,500cc (1,000-lb minimum loaded weight) was run off together on the same course. The road racing Mountain Course was part macadam, part tar, part stone; 302 miles (8laps of 37.75miles) for the Tourist Trophy and 6 laps (226.5miles) for the 'International 1,500 Trophy'.

The main 3 L T.T. event attracted three modified race-prepared cream and red-coloured Bentleys; Bentley III driven by W.O. Bentley himself; three specially designed Harry Ricardo scarlet-red racing Vauxhalls and three modified dreadnought grey 1921 G.P. type Sunbeams. The '1,500 Trophy' attracted three blue Talbot-Darracqs which were smaller version of the Sunbeams with one cylinder block instead of the two that made the bigger cars; three Crossley-Bugattis came from France for the first time; a peacock-blue Enfield-Allday driven by A C Bertelli; Hillman and three Aston Martin though only one ('Bunny') reached the start line.

Sunbeam Experimental department modified four 1921 G.P. chassis for a team of three cars and a reserve. The weight was reduced, 30 gallon bolster tank fitted, two BTH magnetos replaced the Delco coil ignition, two CZC Claudel Hobson carburettors fitted and compression raised to 6.3 to 1 resulting in 112 bhp. Jean Chassagne also had his signature 'Rene Thomas' laminated sprung steel steering wheel.

The T.T. was preceded by two weeks practice on closed roads 4.30a.m. to 7a.m. The event was held in appalling weather, wind, heavy rain and mist reducing visibility to less than 20 yards; later the winner Chassagne described the conditions as "a nightmare in sea of mud". Cars were dispatched at one minute intervals. The calcium chloride, which was used on the circuit as dust-laying compound, in the rain, made the roads muddy and greasy and caused burning irritation to driver's eyes.

Sunbeam I race no.1 for K Lee Guinness (riding mechanic Bill Perkins) winner of the previous Tourist Trophy event in 1914 did not start due to slipped clutch. Sunbeam II race no.4 for H.O.D. Segarve (riding mechanic Paul Dutoit) made fastest lap both in practice and during the race (57.3 mph) but retired with magneto problems on lap five. Sunbeam III race no.7 (its 1921 G.P. race no 10 still grinning under the new livery for Jean Chassagne (riding mechanic Robert Laly) proceeded to win the race in 5hr 24min 50sec averaging 55.78 mph.

Of the nine main event T.T. entrants, one did not start and five completed; the Bentley, the only team to finish, receiving the Team Award and Jean Chassagne described by contemporary press as 'a pure artist at the wheel' won the race outright. Of the ten voiturette starting the event, six completed; Sir Algernon Guinness with Talbot Darracq I no.24 reaching 90 mph on the Sulby straight and winning a 1–2 (with Divo 2nd) for S.T.D. in 4hr14min45.4sec averaging 53.3 mph -faster than some of the bigger-class cars; the Crossley-Bugattis won the team prize though some 20min behind the winner.

=== 1922 Coppa Florio ===
Soon after the successful Tourist Trophy, two of the T.T. cars fitted with the powerful 4.9 L 6-cylinder 1916 engine (for which a unique 4.9 L engine oil reserve hatch was formed in the existing scuttle) were put together with three 1.5 L Talbot Darracq voiturettes bound for the Penya Rhin race at Barcelona on K. Lee Guinness's private steamship yacht Ocean Rover for a long and unpleasant cruise to Spain and hence to Sicily for the Coppa Florio.

The 268.43 miles Coppa Florio took place on 19 November 1922. J. Chassagne had race car no.1, registration number DA6752; H.O.D. Segrave in the second race car no.5 registration number DA6521. Both Sunbeam were still liveried their T.T. 'Sunbeam Dreadnought Grey'.

The surface of the 69-mile circuit was rough and included over 1,600 corners. Upon inspecting the circuit, Louis Coatalen exclaimed "Quel spectacle de desolation!". There were nine starters: two Sunbeams, two Peugeot, three Diatto and a couple of O.Ms (Officine Meccaniche). The cars were dispatched under the gaze of the ex-King Constantine and ex-queen of Greece at five-minute intervals; only four cars finished – the two Peugeot and the two Sunbeam.

The steep gradient of the course caused oil to collect at the back of the Sunbeam engine sump, which resulted in oiled up plugs, the change of which caused delays. Segrave was further delayed during the race helping extricate Meregalli and his riding mechanic who were pinned underneath their overturned Diatto; the driving mechanic died of his injuries – the first fatal accident to occur on the Sicilian circuit. Notwithstanding this and other delays, Segrave finished in second after 8hr 15min and 07 sec (32.351 mph) to Boillot winning Peugeot.

On the last but one lap, high up in the Madonie Circuit Mountains in the vicinity of Polizzi a stone fractured the oil pipe of J Chassagne's mount. Unruffled Chassagne replenished the car with sufficient Olive oil purchased from a nearby village shop. He finished in fourth place.

=== Other speed events ===
Brooklands was used by the S.T.D. Combine to promote the marque through racing success, test new racing cars prior to international events, which were the main thrust of the S.T.D. racing program and display the abilities of redundant racing cars offered for sale by the Works usually after a 'cooling period' of several years. The 1921 G.P. chassis participation in Brooklands event followed this pattern.

The prototype 1921 G.P. chassis was tested at Brooklands 1921 March 21 Easter scratch race still unpainted and fitted with four Zenith carburettors; H.O.D. Segrave winning in 94.64 mph.

After a cooling period chassis no.3 was entered at the 1923 August Brooklands 100 mph long handicap "was a great race, Ropner's Vauxhall winning…Perkins in a 3 litre straight-eight Sunbeam, equaled Ropner's best lap – 101.02mph"; it was sold not long after.

Chassis no.4 with a 4.9 L engine was purchased by Malcolm Campbell, painted blue, liveried 'Blue Bird' and proceeded to successfully take part in numerous Brooklands events in several hands over many years.

The 1921 G.P. chassis were also entered in other events notably, Southport where Sunbeam IX had a great deal of success in the hands of privateer J G Jackson well into the thirties. Two of the cars were purchased by intentional privateers and performed well in 1920s events in France and New Zealand.

== History of Works Team Cars ==
Whilst the registration by S.T.D. for seven participants in the 1921 Grand Prix de l’A.C.F may suggest that at least seven Grand Prix cars were envisaged; only four cars were ultimately entered. There is no direct evidence that more than these four cars and an additional fifth 'Experimental' car were ever constructed.

A single-seater body 1921 G.P. chassis 4.9 L car appeared in 1922 for an attempt on the 24 hour record and subsequently used by Dario Resta 1924 March 29 at Kop Hill Climb where it did second fastest time of day (29.2sec). It is however possible that one of the other chassis (possibly the Experimental car) was temporarily fitted with a single-seater body for these two events. In any case, no further record for this car exists.

The 1921 G.P. chassis proved versatile and their appearance were modified by S.T.D. Works to suit the many events they were entered in with different colour and different radiator badges (Sunbeam, Talbot or Talbot Darracq) in an early attempt at badge engineering. Engine types (3-litre and 4.9-litre), brake system, body configurations, fuel tanks and axle ratios were also changed from one event to another making the essentially identical cars appear potentially different.

Construction of the four cars was instructed towards the end of 1920; first car was tested at Brooklands March 1921; in May, three cars were entered (two Sunbeams and one Talbot Darracq) in the 1921 Indianapolis 500. Back in Sureness, the three Indianapolis cars were fitted with front wheel brakes and entered in that year's July French Grand Prix (two as Talbot Darracq, one as Talbot plus a fourth car again as Talbot). After the Grand Prix, Boillot had an accident in one of the Talbot Darracq at the Spa Hill Climb; subsequently, the car was probably rebuilt. The Two Talbot were entered in Shelsley Walsh Hill Climb in September; this bringing the racing activities of these cars for 1921 to a close.

The four cars were modified to '1922 IOM' configuration and entered (as Sunbeams) in the 1922 Tourist Trophy – three Team car and one reserve. Two of the T.T. cars still as Sunbeams and still painted IOM Dreadnought Grey were entered later that year at the Coppa Florio with 4.9 L engines; this was the last international Works entry for these cars. During this period, a fifth car performed well at Brooklands with a 4.9 L engine. A cooling period followed during which the cars made competitive appearances before being sold to privateers.

Of the five cars, four survive:

- Two of the T.T. cars (Segrave's and Chassagne's winning car) remain largely unmodified in their 1922 configuration; both in the UK.
- One of the T.T. / Coppa Florio became a M Campbell 'Blue Bird'; it went through many transformations before it was dismantled in the 1950s and in 1988 it was resurrected as a standard T.T car.
- The fourth T.T. car competed extensively in UK sand racing before being dismantled in the 1950s and subsequently lost.
- The fifth car retained its 1922 4.9 L configuration and was later sold to an Argentinean privateer who re-bodied it in 1927 as a single-seater after a crash and it remains essentially in this configuration in the Indianapolis Motor Speedway Museum.

Whilst the Sunbeam Works records showing chassis and engine numbers against a team driver did not survive, considerable information some published and some in private hands remains including some records of chassis numbers in Brooklands. Sunbeam racing bodies can only be fitted to the chassis for which they were made without modifying either body or chassis; accordingly identifying a body amounts to identifying a chassis. Research of the history of individual cars was predominantly carried out and published by Dick Messenger, Peter Hull, Graham Vercoe and George Begg. Some information is still missing on some of the cars.

=== The experimental car ===
- Engine: 4.9 L; 1935 -Bentley 4.5 L; 1960s – Lincoln V12 engine; 1965 – original Sunbeam 4.9 L no. 3 with Claudel Hobson carburettors reinstated.
- Body: Pointed G.P tail two seater; 1927 – McAlister Co. aluminium single-seater.
- Livery: 1922 unpainted bonnet; 1922 unpainted bonnet liveried 'Sunbeam'; 1924 – painted bonnet liveried 'Sunbeam' on bonnet; 1927 -Alzaga 'signature' white stripe on the scuttle; 1960s – grey body, red chassis; today – green no.3.

The Works history of this car (1921–1924) cannot be confirmed however; the suggestion below is likely; subsequent history is documented.

Notable for being the prototype for the effective combination of a 4.9 L engine with a 1921 G.P. chassis, the car had achieved considerable success for S.T.D. Works in Britain. Subsequently, purchased by self-proclaimed "first and only Argentinean playboy" Alzaga Unzue, in whose hands it participated in the 1924 French Grand Prix and obtained the first international victory for Argentina. The same year it crashed in the Spanish Grand Prix, the engine was successfully used for motor-boat racing before it was reunited in 1927 with the chassis now in a single-seater form. It was imported to Argentina where it continued to race with various engines before it was put on display in 1965 at the Indianapolis Motor Speedway Museum where it remains with its original 4.9 L engine. (See footnote below.)

==== History ====
1922

- 25 March, Kop Hill, two seater pointed G.P. tail, 1916 4.9 L in-line 6, Vandervell 2nd fastest 27.2sec
- 17 April Brooklands 100 mph Short and Long handicap, two seater pointed G.P. tail, 1916 4.9 L in-line 6, H.O.D. Segrave races 5 & 10 race no. 1; 3rd & 2nd
- 13 May, Brooklands 100 mph Short and Long handicap, two seater pointed G.P. tail, 1916 4.9 L in-line 6, H.O.D. Segrave races 5 & 7 race no. 1; 1st & 3rd
- 18 May, Brooklands Class F Records, two seater pointed G.P. tail, 1916 4.9 L in-line 6, H.O.D. Segrave; 0.5mile (fs)-5mile(fs) – (115.26 mph-114.95 mph)
- 20 May, Brooklands Duke of York Long & Short Handicap and the Athlone Lightning Long Handicap; two seater pointed G.P. tail, 1916 4.9 L in-line 6; H.O.D. Segrave; 2nd in both Duke of York races and 1st in Athlone race (109.82 mph)
- 5 June Brooklands; two seater pointed G.P. tail, 1916 4.9 L in-line 6; H.O.D. Segrave races 5 & 10 race no. 1
- 17 June, Saltburn Speed Trials; two seater pointed G.P. tail, 1916 4.9 L in-line 6; Leo V. Cozens no.15, ftd class O (5 litres) 22.8sec
- 1 July, Spread Eagle; two seater pointed G.P. tail, 1916 4.9 L in-line 6; M. Campbell DA6521, ftd and new hill record 41sec
- 8 July, Holmes Moss Hillclimb, two seater pointed G.P. tail, 1916 4.9 L in-line 6; M. Campbell, DA6521, ftd and new hill record 80.8sec
- 29 July, Shelsley Walsh, two seater, 1916 4.9 L in-line 6; C.A. Bird,2nd 54sec (tail is not visible in photos and it can therefore be one of the Coppa Florio T.T. tail cars – Blue Bird or T.T. winner)
- 30 September, Brooklands Speed Championship; two seater pointed G.P. tail, 1916 4.9 L in-line 6; H.O.D. Segrave 1st in class, 105.58 mph

1924

- 29 March Kop Hill Climb, single-seater D. Resta registration DA6207 2nd fastest 29.2sec
- 1924 July 13, Grand Prix de Provence, Miramas, 100 mile inauguration race, Martin Macoco Alzaga Unzue, two seater pointed G.P. tail, 1916 4.9 L in-line 6 'Sunbeam' liveried on bonnet; 1st (92 mph, lapped at 94 mph). First International victory for Argentina.
- 27 September, St Sebastian, two seater pointed G.P. tail, 1916 4.9 L in-line 6; M.M. Alzaga Unzue no.17 DNF (crash)

1925

St Sebastian Spain, Copa del Rey, 4.9 L engine installed on 'Papirus' motorboat Despujols design, M.M. Alzaga Unzue 2nd place. It is recorded that Alzaga was successful in 1925 with 'Charabon' in Biarritz and San Sebastian boat races; he may also have participated successfully in the Monte Carlo event. It is said that 'Charabon' was a 12 cyl Sunbeam engine boat; did Alzaga have two boats with two engines? If not, it may have actually been the 4.9 L Sunbeam 6-cylinder engine:

- 28 March, Monte Carlo Meeting, some, all or none of "5 Firsts, 1 Second"
- 17 August, Biarritz, some or all of "Championship of the Sea, Olazabal Cup, 2 Second Prizes, 3 Special trophies"
- 8 September, San Sebastian, some or all of "7 trophies and valuable money prizes"

1927

- Rebuilt by McAlister Co. Isle de la Jette, Neuille sur Seine, Paris as a single-seater, central steering with clutch and brake pedals flanking; brake lever on nearside, aluminium bodywork with under-tray; liveried with Alzaga 'signature' white stripe on the scuttle; Talbot radiator, registered 2546 W1.
- 5 December arrived at Buenos Aires on board the Cap Arcona.
- For sale by Alzaga in Buenos Aires, Argentina through his motorboat, car and bodywork company Ysozaga y Compania

1928

- January San Martin Autodrome Argentine, tested successfully during race.
- May, might have been purchased by Francisco (Fernandez?) Hampton who may have run a training lap for the 500 Miles which he nevertheless did not participate in. Tuned by Luis Viglione (who continued working with Alzaga well into the thirties) at an estimated 124 mph for 6000rpm

1935

- Eric Forrest Greene Argentina. Prepared for racing – engine re-boared to 192.5CID, seat changed, copper fuel tank exposed.
- 9 August 500 Millas Argentinas, retired with poor handling and magneto failure, E Forrest (modified dashboard)
- December, Parana Argentine, E Forrest DNF
- E Forrest fitted his Bentley engine and it was known as the 'Ben-Sun'

1936

- Lincoln Argentine, E Forrest with either 4.9 L or Bentley engine, 2nd in the heat but retired in final lap

1954

- Eric Forrest Greene passes away in Argentina

1960s

- Roberto Noccetti owns the car (fitted Lincoln V12 engine?) painted grey body, red chassis

1965

- Indianapolis Motor Speedway Museum purchased for $4,000 installed with a Lincoln V12 engine and accompanied with the Sunbeam 4.9 L engine, Claudel Hobson carburettors, magneto ignition. Wheelbase 105.5 inches, front tread 56.25 inches, rear tread 54.5 inches.
- The car today is installed with the 4.9 L engine and is painted green liveried no.3; the single-seater body seems largely similar to the 1927 body with some modifications including additional blisters on bonnet, absent fairing, brake lever moved offside, gear lever moved, and the under-tray is absent.

=== The Sand Racer ===
- Engine: straight-eight 3 L; later supercharged; 1934 Rolls-Royce 14.2 L Falcon engine.
- Body: Pointed Tail G.P.; liveried 'Sunbeam IX'.

This was a 1921 G.P. chassis fitted with a straight-eight 3-litre engine and a G.P. body. The Works history of this car is unknown. Post Works it was owned by J.G. Jackson who gradually developed it and raced it with alcohol based fuel at the Southport sand races with considerable success. After an engine failure in 1934 it was fitted with a Rolls-Royce 14.2 L Falcon engine (or 20/25-h.p.). The car was dismantled and by the 1950s lost; this is the only 1921 G.P. chassis known to be lost. (See footnote below.)

==== History ====
1925

- Purchased from Malcolm Campbell but was not his own 4.9 L 'Bluebird' (Sunbeam IV below)
- 21 March Southport MC Speed Trials G J Jackson; 1–10miles 1st
- 16 May Southport MC Speed Trials G J Jackson; 2nd
- 27 June Cheshire Centre ACU Meeting Birkdale Sands Southport 1 km (ss) and 10 miles; G J Jackson; 1st (unlimited class)
- 15 August Southport Motor races G J Jackson 20mile 2nd

1926

- 20 March Southport MC Race Meeting; G J Jackson; 1mile 1st; 20mile 2nd
- 22 May Cheshire Centre ACU Meeting Birkdale Sands Southport; G J Jackson; 1mile (ss) 1st; 10mile 1st
- 3 July Southport MC Race Meeting; G J Jackson; 20mile 1st
- 14 August Southport MC Race Meeting; G J Jackson; 25mile 1st
- 18 September Southport MC Race Meeting; G J Jackson; 10mile 1st; 50mile 1st
- 2 October Southport MC Race Meeting; G J Jackson; 10mile 1st
- 11 October Southport MC Race Meeting; G J Jackson; 0.5mile 2nd 31.4sec

1928

- Cozette blower fitted
- 28 April Southport MC Race Meeting; G J Jackson; 1mile 2nd
- 11 August Southport MC Race Meeting; G J Jackson; 1mile 1st (Novice) 2nd (Unlimited General)
- 8 September Southport MC Race Meeting; G J Jackson; 1 km(fs) 1st (Novice and Unlimited Novice) 79.32 mph
- 6 October Southport MC Race Meeting; G J Jackson; 2nd

1929

- 28 September Southport MC Race Meeting; G J Jackson; 1 km (fs) 2nd (Unlimited Novice); 1mile 1st (Novice and Unlimited Novice)

1931

- 28 March Southport MC Race Meeting; G J Jackson; 1mile 3rd
- 8 August Southport MC Race Meeting; G J Jackson; 1mile(ss) 1st (Unlimited General)
- 19 September Southport MC Race Meeting; G J Jackson; 1 km(fs) 1st 105.52 mph
- 3 October Southport MC Race Meeting; G J Jackson; 1mile 1st (Unlimited)

1932

- 16 January Southport MC Race Meeting; G J Jackson; 1 & 4mile 1st (Unlimited)
- 2 April Southport MC Race Meeting; G J Jackson; 1 & 2mile 3rd; 4mile 2nd (in class), 3rd (unlimited)
- 25 June Southport MC Race Meeting; G J Jackson; 1 & 5mile 2nd
- 10 September Southport Championship Race Meeting; G J Jackson; 1 km (fs) 2nd 107.5 mph ‘100" Gold Badge; 1mile 2nd
- 8 October Southport MC Race Meeting; G J Jackson; 1, 5, 11miles 2nd, 3rd and 3rd respectively

1933

- 4 March Southport MC Race Meeting; G J Jackson; 1 & 5miles 2ndftd
- 1 July Southport MC Race Meeting; G J Jackson; 1, 3, 5, 11miles 1st
- 30 September Southport MC Race Meeting; G J Jackson; 1 km 1st; 1mile 1st

1934

- 7 April Southport MC Race Meeting; G J Jackson; 1mile 1st ftd
- 29 September Southport MC Race Meeting; G J Jackson; 1 km (fs), 1mile(ss), 4miles, 20miles (handicap) 1st
- Rolls-Royce 14.2 L Falcon (or 20/25-h.p.) engine fitted by J W Burnard.

1935

- Fensom & W Boddy testing at Brooklands

1940 John W Burnand with Rolls-Royce 14.5 – litre V12 Falcon engine

1950s

- The Chassis, body and the Rolls-Royce 14.2 L Falcon engine were known to exist in pieces.
- Lost.

=== Sunbeam II (the Segrave T.T. car) ===
- Chassis: No. 2.
- Engine: straight-eight 3-litre
- Body: Standard 1922 T.T.
- Livery: 1922 T.T. Dreadnought Grey; later, British Racing Green, liveried 'T.T. Sunbeam' later omitted and liveried white on bolster tank panels
- Registration: MN2044 (IOM Temporary); KU 2727, 739 BH

Soon after obtaining the best European result in the 1921 Indianapolis 500, this car took part in that year's French Grand Prix. Modified by the Works for H.O.D. Segrave for the 1922 T.T. it achieved fastest lap both in practice and during the race but did not finish due to magneto problem.

Fitted with lights, self-starter and flywheel for road use by Sunbeam before it was sold in 1925. It remained largely unused until purchased by Sunbeam expert Anthony S. Heal who had Len Gibbs in 1946 comprehensively rebuild the car and paint it British Racing Green; non-original rigid pattern steering wheel fitted. It was subsequently used occasionally on the road before it was sold to the Rootes Motor Museum in 1956.

In the 1960s it passed to John T Panks (Rootes General Manager) and was restored in New York; a pair of Solexes replaced the original Claudel Hobson carburettors. In the US it participated in various vintage speed events before it was repatriated by Panks to the U.K. where it took part in similar V.S.C.C. events.

Purchased by Bentley enthusiast Guy Shoesmith in 1968 who commissioned Donald McKenzie to carry out bare chassis full mechanical restoration; new dashboard using the original instruments was made. Further V.S.C.C. events were undertaken before the car was housed in the Donington Collection. It was offered via a Phillips auction in 1988 and purchased for a private collection based in the UK.

==== History ====
- 1921 May 30, Indianapolis 500, Ora Haiba Sunbeam no.16, 5:57:46, 83.86 mph, 5th place, winning $3,000
- 1921 July 25, French Grand Prix de l’A.C.F. Le Mans
- 1922 June 22, Isle of Man RAC Tourist Trophy, H.O.D. Segrave (riding mechanic Paul Dutoit) Sunbeam no.4, *DNF (magneto problem), fastest lap 57.70 mph
- 1925 Ronalad I Smith of Manningham, Bradford
- Eric S. Myers LTD. (Sunbeam Motor Trader) of Manningham Lane, Bradford
- 1942 Anthony S. Heal
- 1956 Rootes Motors Museum
- 1960s John T Panks New York (1961 February 9–13 National Sports Cars Exposition New York; Vintage racing at Bridge-hampton, Thompson, Lime Rock, Watkins Glen; V.S.C.C. speed events)
- 1968 Guy Shoesmith U.K. (1969 September, Thruxton V.S.C.C. Race Meeting 4 lap handicap, 2nd (Guy Shoesmith), fastest lap 2min 10sec; 1969 May, Belgium National Day of Records (Guy Shoesmith). On show at the Donnignton Grand Prix Collection.
- 1988 Private Collection (via Phillips Auction)
- Autocar 1982 28 August pp. 27–28

=== Sunbeam III (the T.T. winner) ===
Chassis: No. 3.

Engine: 1921 straight-eight 3 L, modified for the 1922 T.T.; temporarily with 1916 4.9 L in-line 6-cylinder for the 1922 Coppa Florio before T.T. engine re-fitted in 1923.

Body: Standard 1922 T.T.

Livery: 1921-British Racing Green liveried no.10; 1922 T.T.- Dreadnought grey liveried no.7; 1922 Sicily -dreadnought grey; 1925 – liveried 'Sunbeam VII'; 1960 – oxide red; 1989- British Racing Green liveried no.7; 2014 – Dreadnought Grey

The most successful of the 1921 S.T.D. Works cars, it is also the most original and complete. It is notable for being racing legend H.O.D. Segrave's first ever Grand Prix mount and the first car to bring international racing success to Britain after the Great War. After retirement from the S.T.D. Works, it spent most of its life in a few long-term ownerships in New Zealand. It was displayed in a motor museum for many years before it was recommissioned and repatriated to the UK.

==== Registration ====
- 1921 French Grand Prix XH1385 (London registration)
- 1922 Isle of Man Tourist Trophy MN2041, MN2042, MN4043, MN4044 were used by the team temporarily on the Isle of Man
- 1922 Coppa Florio DA6752 (Wolverhampton)
- 1926–1990 registered in New Zealand where registration numbers changed annually e.g., in 1938: 40–749, 1954: 120–833
- 1999 SV7968
- 2010 DA6752

==== History ====
- 1921 S.T.D. Experimental Department Grand Prix Team car
- 1921 July 25, Grand Prix de l’ACF Le Mans, Talbot race No.10, H.O.D. Segrave (riding mechanic Jules Moriceau), average speed 62.6 mph, time 5:08:06, 9th
- 1921 September 9, Shelsley Walsh Hillclimb, Sunbeam race No.14, Count Louis Zborowski, 65.8sec, 7th
- 1922 June 22, Isle of Man Tourist Trophy, Sunbeam race No. 7, Jean Chassagne (riding mechanic Robert Laly), 302 miles (8 laps of 37.75m) at 5hr 24min 50sec averaging 55.78 mph, 1st
- 1922 November 19, Coppa Florio, Sicily, Sunbeam 4.9 L race No. 1, Jean Chassagne (riding mechanic Hivernat), 4th, unplaced
- 1923 August, Brooklands 100 mph long handicap, Bill Perkins, 101.02 mph
- 1925 Mathew Wills, New Zealand (via R F Fuggle UK)
- 1926 February 15, Muriwai Beach, New Zealand Motor Cup, Mathew Wills (riding mechanic Stanley Jones), race No. 8, 2nd
- 1927 February, Muriwai Beach, New Zealand Motor Cup, Mathew Wills (riding mechanic Stanley Jones), race No. 156, DNS
- 1927 George Henning, New Zealand
- 1928 February, Muriwai Beach, New Zealand Motor Cup, George Henning, race No. 9, DNF
- 1928 Dick Messenger, Auckland, New Zealand
- 1933 January 2, Helensville Hill Climb, New Zealand, Dick Messenger
- 1946 Ken Hemus, Auckland, New Zealand
- 1947 Roy Cowan, Wellington, New Zealand
- 1948 New Zealand Sprint Championship, Roy Cowan, race No. 8, 3rd in Class
- 1949 Paekakariki, New Zealand, Roy Cowan, under 3 Litre Class Record
- 1950 January 2, Inaugural Tahuna Nelson Beach Race, New Zealand, Roy Cowan, race No. 15, 1st (Unlimited Handicap)
- 1951 Rob Shand, Strathconan, Fairlie, New Zealand (founder member of the Vintage Car Club of New Zealand)
- 1974 -1988 Queenstown Motor Museum – Permanent Exhibit (on loan)
- 1989 Tom Wheatcroft, Donington Grand Prix Collection (restored and exhibited from 1992)
- 1992 Donington Grand Prix Collection – Permanent Exhibit (no.7)
- 1997 Cartier Concours
- 2003 Hanson Collection
- 2005 Laguna Seca, US, Phil Hill, 1st in class
- 2005 Pebble Beach Concours, Beaulieu Trophy and second place in the Concours d’Elegance.
- 2006 Goodwood Revival, Stanley Mann
- 2006 Ennstal Classic, Austria, John Hanson
- 2008 Cholmondeley Pageant of Power, Brian Redman
- 2008 Veteran Car Club Centenary Isle of Man Tourist Trophy Exhibition 'T.T. 100'
- 2008 Brooklands Double Twelve
- 2009 Private Collection
- 2009 The 'Welsh' VSCC, Presteigne,
- 2014 Hampton Court Concours
- 2014 Royal Automobile Club Rotunda Display
- 2015 Manx Classic

=== Sunbeam IV (Campbell's 'Blue Bird') ===
- Chassis: No.4.
- Engine: 3 L straight 8; 1922 Coppa Florio- in-line 6-cylinder 1916 4.9 L; 1931 – replacement 3 L straight 8; 1933 – the ‘Gold Star’ Vauxhall 30/98; 1988 – 3 L straight 8 no.2.
- Body: Standard T.T.; 1924 – pointed (non-G.P.) tail; 1989 – T.T. style two seater.
- Livery: 1922 T.T.- dreadnought grey; 1922 Coppa Florio- dreadnought grey liveried 'Sunbeam'; 1924 – 'Blue Bird Blue' with "Blue Bird" liveried on bonnet; 1925 – liveried 'Firefly I'; 1926 – red with black wheels; 1933 -'Primrose'; 1934 – blue; 1989 – British Racing Green liveried no.1; 2014 – British Racing Green liveried no.4

After success in the 1922 Coppa Florio as S.T.D. Works Team car, the history of this car is bound with speed ace Malcolm Campbell and is one of his 'Blue Bird' cars. During his two-season ownership, Campbell used the car in a variety of speed events, achieving many Brooklands and Hill Climb firsts. 'Blue Bird' was then sold to Dunlop and driven by racing driver Paul Dutoit, erstwhile riding mechanic to H.O.D. Segrave, in Brooklands for one season, tyres testing together with another illustrious Brooklands racing car – the 200 mile Alvis; the cars nicknamed 'Firefly I' and 'Firefly II' respectively.

New ownership in 1926 has given the aging racing car a second lease of life and launched it onto years of remarkable Brooklands racing success, described by William Boddy as "the best run of success by any Brooklands' car in such a period". Racing success continued well into the 1930s when with a replacement engine it became known first as 'the Munday Special' and later in 1934 'the Bainton Special'. It was dismantled in the 1950s and later in 1988 resurrected as a 1922 Sunbeam T.T. no.1 and displayed at the Donnington Grand Prix Collection from where it passed to private collections.

==== History ====
1922

- June IoM TT Sunbeam straight-eight three-litre
- 19 November Coppa Florio 268.5 miles (4laps) T.T. body 4.9Lt, race no. 5, 8:15:7 (32.5 mph), H O D Segrave, 2nd

1923

- 23 June Fanoe Island Denmark Speed Trials, 6-litre Class two-way (fs) mean speed 100 mph, M. Campbell registration no. XO3716, 1st
- 8 September Shelsley Walsh, T.T. body 4.9 L, race no 35, M. Campbell, reg no XO3716, 54.8sec, 1st (3-litre class)

1924

- 21 April Brooklands Easter Meeting Lightning Long Handicap, T.T. body 4.9 L, in 'Blue Bird Blue' with "Blue Bird" on bonnet, M. Campbell XO3716 race 5 no.5, race 10 no.6, 1st (100.5 mph), lapping 111.67 mph
- 9 June Brooklands, T.T. body 4.9 L, M. Campbell registration XO3716 race 3 – car no 2; race 7 – car no 1
- 28 June Spread Eagle Hill-Climb, T.T. body 4.9 L, M. Campbell, reg no. XO3716, 2nd fastest time of day 39.8s
- June Porthcawl one mile sand course, pointed tail (non G.P.) 4.9 L, M. Campbell, XO3716, ftd 47.4s crossing at 110 mph
- 4 August Brooklands August Meeting 26th lightning Long & Short Handicap, pointed tail 4.9 L, M. Campbell XO3716, no.3, 1st in both events (107.5 & 103.25 respectively) lapping 112.93 mph

1925

- Dunlop Tyre testing at Brooklands liveried 'Firefly I'

1926

- Captain (later) Sir A G Miller for £355
- 5 April Brooklands Easter Meeting Private competitors Handicap bright red with black wheels & new shock absorbers, A G Miller, 1st 91.75 mph
- 24 April Brooklands Surbiton MC Meeting Surrey Senior Short handicap, A G Miller; 2nd, 99.5 mph Kaye Don in another race
- 24 May Brooklands Whitson Gold Vase Handicap A G Miller from Kaye Don on Viper, 1st at 102.7 mph lapping at 114.23 mph
- 28 May Brooklands International Class C Records 1 km (ss) & 1 mile (ss) (68.59 mph & 78.19 mph respectively unconfirmed), A G Miller
- 23 June Brooklands Essex MC Senior Long & Lightning Long Handicap, A G Miller, 3rd & 2nd respectively,
- 3 July Brooklands Summer 34th Lightning Short Handicap, A G Miller, 1st 102.12 mph,
- 2 August Brooklands August Bank Holiday Meeting 50th 100 mph Handicap, 35th Lightning Sort Handicap, $9th 100 mph Long Handicap, Kaye Don, 3rd, 1st (102.65 mph) and 2nd respectively
- 14 August Brooklands Essex MC Senior long Handicap & Lightning Long Handicap, Kaye Don, 2 & 3rd respectively
- 11 September Brooklands BARC 36th Lightning Short Handicap, Kaye Don, 2nd

1927

- 18 April Brooklands Easter Meetings Founder's, 100 mph Long Handicap, Lightning Long Handicap, Kaye Don entrant H Wright 1st, 1st & 2nd (105.03, 107.87) respectively
- 23 April Surbiton MC Senior Short Handicap, Senior Long Handicap, All Comers, Kaye Don entrant H Wright 3rd, 2nd & 3rd respectively

1928

- E L Bouts for £240 painted red with pointed tail 4.9 L overhauled by T & T but then maintained by him. Initially shared drives with Kaye Don (lapped 116.65 mph) & Jack Dunfee (lapped 117.46 mph), lapping at 113.71 mph, top speed about 130 mph at Brooklands Club days & Bank holidays. First car W Boddy has photographed in Brooklands as a child.
- 9 April 1928 Brooklands Easter 100 mph Long & Short Handicap, Kaye Don & J Dunfee, 2nd & 2nd
- 28 May Brooklands Whitsun Meeting Gold Star & Founder's Gold Vase, 55th 100 mph Long Handicap, J Dunfee, E L Bouts & J Dunfee 3rd, 2nd, & 1st
- 1 September Brooklands Surbiton MC Junior Long Handicap, E L Bouts 1st (102.27mh)
- 22 September Brooklands 100 mph Long Handicap & Taylor Cup Sprint Race, E L Bouts, 2nd & 1 dead heat respectively

1929

- 20 May Brooklands 59th 100 mph Long Handicap, E L Bouts 2nd
- 5 August Brooklands August Meeting 65th 100 mph Short & 46th Lightning Long Handicap, E L Bouts 3rd & 1st (105.83 mph)

1930

- 22 March Brooklands Opening Meeting Surrey Short Handicap, E L Bouts, 3rd

1931

- 14 March Brooklands Spring Meeting Lincoln Short & Long Handicap, E L Bouts, 2nd & 1st (101.42 mph)

From April 1926 it achieved 12 first places, 15-second places and nine thirds. According to William Boddy "the best run of success by any Brooklands' car in such a period".

- The 4.9 L engine fails and scraped by E L Bouts
- Advertised by T&T for sale for £180
- Geoffrey Daybell
- R J Munday (with replacement 3Lt straight 8 engine)

1933

- R J Munday with the "Gold Star" Vauxhall 30/98 engine painted Primrose (whe Munday Special)

1934

- Alan G Bainton with Vauxhall 30/98 engine painted Blue (whe Bainton Special)

1935

- Painted blue

==== Post-war ====
- John Howell with Vauxhall 30/98 engine and radiator sold to Sir Ralph Millais in 1957 together with one complete straight-8 3 L engine, a second one with missing bottom and cracked block. Both missing the side panels, two gearboxes and sundry other parts including crankshaft.
- 1959 sold to Rob Shand (New Zealand) as a bare chassis with many straight-eight three-litre engine parts ex John Howell and A S Heal for £125.
- 1988 the bare chassis was fitted with a spare straight-eight 3-litre engine by Ian Jones (Fairlie, New Zealand) for Rob Shand
- 1989 sold to Tom Wheatcroft and resurrected into a 1922 T.T. configuration race no.1 by Auto-Restoration of Christchurch, New Zealand and subsequently placed on permanent display at the Donnigton Grand Prix Collection, UK
- 2011 sold to the Sielecki Collection, Argentine via Martin Chisholm
- 2014 sold via Hall & Hall

== "The invincible" Talbot-Darracq ==
In 1921 three light cars were constructed at the S.T.D. Suresnes Works for the 1,500 Voiturettes class. These were in effect a smaller version of the Sunbeam 3-litre Grand Prix cars – their near identical engines built around one of the two blocks used by the G.P. cars with similar though shorter chassis. Painted blue and entered in the premium events for their class, these cars continued to dominate Voiturette racing for six years, winning every race and earning the appellation "The invincible Talbot-Darracq".

In a sensational debut in the 1921 French Grand Prix des Voiturettes held at Le Mans, they finished first, second and third – the second time in Voiturettes racing history this has happened (the first occasion having been Sunbeam in the 1912 Coupe de l’Auto). During 1921 and 1922 these ultra-reliable cars run in six races and won every one of them, regularly finishing 1–2–3. In 1923 they were fitted with a V. Bertarione designed engine in which form with some modifications they continued to compete in eleven further events to 1926 again winning all of them.

None of the three cars is known to survive.

=== Chassis ===
Wheelbase 8; 0", track 3’ 7"; four speed gearbox; four wheel brake; differential-less rear axle; dry weight 1,456 lbs.; Hawker- built streamline bodies for the 1921 Brooklands J.C.C. 200-mile Race.

=== Engine ===
The 1,486cc engine was half a 3-litre G.P. engine (for full specification see 3-litre engine above). Compression was 6.4 to 1 producing 53b.h.p. at 4,000r.p.m. Unlike the Grand Prix engine, this engine was directly mounted on the chassis at four points with no sub-frame. A single Claudel Hobson carburettor was used and later a single Solex. Ignition by coil fed by a battery. Maximum speed 95m.p.h.

=== Racing record ===
1921 September 18, Coupe Internationale des Voiturettes Le Mans, 279 mile

- 1) Rene Thomas (riding mechanic Albert Divo) 3:52:16, 72.1m.p.h.
- 2) K Lee Guinness (riding mechanic B Perkins) 3:54.11
- 3) H.O.D. Segrave (riding mechanic J Moriceau) 3:54.51

22 October, Brooklands J.C.C. 200-mile race, 201mile:

- 1)H.O.D. Segrave 2:16:26, 88.82m.p.h., fastest lap 97.65m.p.h.
- 2)K. Lee Guinness 2:16.31
- 3)M. Campbell 2:20.28

1922 June 22, Isle of Man 'International 1,500 Trophy' ran simultaneously with the Tourist Trophy, 226mile

- 1)A. Lee Guinness 4:14:46, 53.3m.p.h.
- 2)Albert Divo 4:17.38, 52.75m.p.h

2 July, Course de Cote de Val-Suzon

- 1) Rigoulot 3.56 mins

6 August, Course de Cote du Mont Ventoux

- 1) A Divot 29.32 mins

19 August, Brooklands J.C.C. 200-mile race, 199mile:

- 1)K. Lee Guinness 2:17:37, 88.1m.p.h.
- 3)H.O.D. Segrave 2:21.39, 85.55m.p.h.

20 August, Course de Cote Lafrey

- 1) A Divot 6.57 mins

16 September, Coupe Internationale des Voiturettes Le Mans, 375mile:

- 1)K. Lee Guinness 5:12:07, 72.1m.p.h.
- 2)Albert Divo
- 3)H.O.D. Segrave

5 November, Grand Prix de la Penya Rhin, Villafranca circuit, Barcelona, Spain, 331mile:

- 1) K Lee Guinness 4:55:46, 65.4m.p.h.
- 4) H.O.D. Segrave

== Footnotes ==
=== The 1921 3 L straight-eight ===
The specifications are detailed in:

- Motor Sport 1948 March, Cecil Clutton pp. 75–78
- Sunbeam Racing Cars, Anthony S Heal, 1989 p. 83
- Sunbeam Racing Cars, Anthony S Heal, 1989 pp. 87–9
- Sunbeam Racing Cars, Anthony S Heal, 1989 pp. 310–311
- Racing Cars Between 1919 and 1939, T.A.S.O. Mathieson, 1963 pp. 182–183

=== The 1916 4.9 L 6-cylinder ===
The specifications are detailed in:

- Sunbeam Racing Cars, Anthony S Heal, 1989 p. 80
- Sunbeam Racing Cars, Anthony S Heal, 1989 pp. 310–311
- Racing Cars Between 1919 and 1939, T.A.S.O. Mathieson, 1963 pp. 180–181
- The Classic Twin-Cam Engine, Griffith Borgeson, 1981 pp. 89–90

=== The experimental car ===
The identity of this car July 1924 on is established in the documents listed below. The Works identity (1922–1924) is deduced from cross-referencing event details against known histories of other cars and from photographs where details in bonnet and tail can be examined (also listed below) and is therefore conjectural.

Frontal image could suggest that this car was C A Bird in 1922 July 29 at Shelsley Walsh but this cannot be confirmed without a further image from a different angle.

Converting two-seater cars to single-seater and rapidly back was not unusual for S.T.D. Works and it may be that this car was so converted for Dario Resta at 29 March Kop Hill Climb.

- Sunbeam Racing Cars, Anthony S Heal, 1989 p. 131–133, 137, 140, 178, Appendix III
- Fuerza Libra 1919–1942 Grand Prix, Spots Car &Specials Racing in the Pampas, Guillermo Sanchez – entries for *'Sunbeam' and 'Martin Maximo Pablo Macoco Alzaga Unzue'
- Motor Sport 1986 May 'The 4.9-litre Sunbeams, William Boddy pp. 535–537
- The Shand Archive ref. 0260-7/5/88
- 1995 S.T.D. Journal, 'Sunbeam 1.5 L Marine Engine Supercharged'
- 1998 S.T.D. Journal, Autumn, 'Marine Engines', Keith Taylor
- 1999 S.T.D. Journal, Spring, Marine Engines'
- Carbooks Volume 21 1922, Michael Frostick (editor) p. 69

=== The Sand Racer ===
The works identity of this car is unknown. Post–works it is interlinked with the privateer George J Jackson; in 1934 the engine failed and was replaced with a 14.2-litre Rolls-Royce Falcon or 20/25 hp (depending on source); car subsequently dismantled and by 1950s lost; all as detailed in the sources listed below:

- Sunbeam Racing Cars, Anthony S Heal, 1989, pp. 290–292, 341–363
- The History of Brooklands 1906–1940, William Boddy, 1957, p. 290
- The Shand Archive ref. 0037-23/9/57
- Motor Sport 1943 April pp. 80–81

=== Sunbeam II (the Segrave T.T. car) ===
It is stated that this car participated in the 1921 Indianapolis 500 for O. Haibe. It then participated in the 1921 French Grand Prix but the identity of the driver is not known; it was thought to have been H.O.D. Segrave but this is no longer believed to be the case as the car today retaining its original body does not resemble Segrave's car in the Grand Prix.

The attribution to H.O.D. Segrave in the 1922 T.T. is derived from the shape of the bonnet blister, scuttle guard and the extended sitting position. Further information detailed from:

- Sunbeam Racing Cars, Anthony S Heal, 1989 pp. 85–86, 87–99, 333–336
- Automobile Connoisseur – The 1921/22 Grand Prix Sunbeam, Peter Hull pp. 66–75
- Shand Archive ref. 0094-21/4/69, 0095-21/4/69
- Motor Sport 1948 March, Cecil Clutton p. 76
- Autocar 1982 28 August pp. 27–28

=== Sunbeam III (the T.T. winner) ===
This car was identified in period by the Sunbeam Works as the Chassagne winning car an attribution which is confirmed by body features which also associate it with other events listed here; the history of this car is extensively detailed in writing from 1922 on and some relevant documents are listed below.

It is likely that this car participated in the 1921 Indianapolis 500 but this cannot be confirmed.

Presented by Sunbeam in period as Chassagne's 'winning Sunbeam' in the Isle of Man T.T., the particular body shape including the distinct bonnet blisters, as well as, the no.10 grinning under Chassagne's winning no.7 also identify this car as the H.O.D. Segrave 1921 Grand Prix no. 10).

Period documents identify Segrave's and Chassagne's T.T. cars as Sunbeam II and III respectively and it may not be a coincidence that the chassis of these two cars are stamped No.2 and No3 respectively.

This car has a distinct scuttle hatch associated with the use of a 4.9 L engine; cross-referencing event details shows that the only event in which this car could have taken part in with a 4.9 L engine is the 1922 Coppa Florio; this is further corroborated by a distinct lever on nearside scuttle – also visible on the Zborowski car in the 1921 Shelsley Walsh – other body details such as tail shape and seats confirm this identification.

William Boddy 1947 Brooklands records identify this chassis (No.3) as the car Bill Perkins raced in 1923; a photograph of Bill Perkins with the car in that event confirms this.

A letter from R.F. Fuggle with accompanying photograph confirms the car liveried 'Sunbeam VII' (in acknowledgment of its 1922 T.T. winning race no.7) was sold in 1925 to M Wills of New Zealand.

Subsequent owner of this car 1928–1946 Dick Messenger recorded that the actual liveried 1922 T.T. number 7 was revealed in 1930 under later paint; he also pointed out that the fixed driving position which cannot be modified without substantial changes to the car's body, was for a small man which Chassagne was known to be; it is of interest that conversely, Sunbeam II (Segrave's mount) is fixed for a tall man which Segrave was; Segrave, in turn, recorded that each car was tailor-made by the Sunbeam Works for its driver 'so much so that A often cannot drive B's car or vice versa'.

It is possible that this car was owned and raced by J G Jackson during the period 1923–1925 but this has not been verified.

The originality of this car was safeguarded unwittingly by Dick Messenger who removed in 1930 the racing body and carburettors for safe keeping whilst using the car on the road with alternative body; immediate post-war racing was undertaken with yet another body before Messenger in 1951 assisted Rob Shand to reunite the racing body and carburettors with the car. The car was displayed in the Donington Museum with a replica body but this was discarded and the original body is back on the car; dated Works gearing ratios stamps for 1921 and 1922 were exposed in 2010. Further information detailed from:

- 1948 March, Motor Sport, Cecil Clutton
- 1949 January, Motor Sport
- 1957 June, Beaded Wheels 'A wolf in sheep's clothing', A. R. E. (Dick) Messenger
- 1970 Automobile Connoisseur – The 1921/22 Grand Prix Sunbeam, Peter Hull
- 1971 Beaded Wheels 'The Henri Sunbeams' A. R. E. (Dick) Messenger
- 1985 Flat To The Boards, A History of Motor Car Sport in New Zealand From 1901 to 1940, A.R.E. (Dick) Messenger and Douglas E Wood
- 1991 Historic Racing Cars of New Zealand, Graham Vercoe
- 1999 A classic world and when the engine roars: a tale of three T.T. sunbeams, G Begg
- 1993 June, Motor Sport 'Tom's Twin T.T. Sunbeams', Eion Young
- 2005 November, Motor Sport, 'Return of the Prodigal Sunbeam', Paul Fearnley
- 2008 Television 'Victory by Design- Grand Prix Greats' presented and driven by Alan de Cadenet.
- 2014 October, Octane, 'Only Original Twice', Mark Dixon
- Seventeen Sports Cars 1919–1930, Peter Hull and Nigel Arnold-Foster p. 141

=== Sunbeam IV (Campbell's 'Blue Bird') ===
For a long time it was thought that the history of this car is lost; however, documents in the Shand Archive listed below, confirm that this car is in fact the well known Bainton Special which is in turn is likely Campbell's 'Blue Bird'.

This car may have participated in the 1921 Indianapolis 500 and likely in the 1921 French Grand Prix but this cannot be confirmed. It did participate in the 1922 Tourist Trophy but it is not known which of the cars (team or reserve) this car may have been.

The chassis number of this car is No.4, recorded in 1924 Brooklands Easter Meeting, possibly in a sleight of hand, as 104.

The history 1922 to 1931 was detailed by William Boddy and later history by G Begg as listed below.

- Motor Sport 1986 May 'The 4.9-litre Sunbeams, William Boddy pp. 535–537
- The History of Brooklands 1906–1940, William Boddy, 1957 pp. 218, 234, 256, 261, 265, 267, 277, 284
- Sunbeam Racing Cars, Anthony S Heal, 1989 pp. 134–138, 140, 288, 295–296, 338–340, 344–347, 349–355, 357, 359
- The Shand Archive: ref. 0037-23/9/57, 0038-23/9/57; 0040-2/3/59; 0045-25/3/59; 0046-25/3/59; 0047-21/4/59; 0050-16/6/59; 0051-16/6/59; 0052-30/6/59; 0053-1/7/59; 0054-18/7/59; 0055-18/7/59; 0056-27/8/59; 0058-25/11/60
- Automobile Connoisseur – The 1921/22 Grand Prix Sunbeam, Peter Hull pp. 73–74
- A classic world and when the engine roars: a tale of three T.T. sunbeams, 1999, G Begg pp. 157, 159–170
- 1993 June, Motor Sport 'Tom's Twin T.T. Sunbeams', Eion Young

=== "The invincible" Talbot-Darracq ===
Information was collated from the sources listed below. There is some discrepancy in racing records between the different sources.

- 1952 March 7 Autosport pp. 296–301
- The Classic Twin-Cam Engine, Griffith Borgeson, 1981 pp. 92–93
- Racing Cars Between 1919 and 1939, T.A.S.O. Mathieson, 1963 pp. 188–190
- Motoring Entente, Ian Nickols and Kent Karslake, 1956 pp. 188, 193–194, 504
- The Lure of Speed, H O D Segrave, 1928 pp. 91–96, 123–129, 132–133

== Research references ==
- Sunbeam Racing Cars, Anthony S Heal, 1989
- The Lure of Speed, H O D Segrave, 1928
- The History of Brooklands 1906–1940, William Boddy, 1957
- The Boys' Life of Sir Henry Segrave, Capt. Malcolm Campbell and J Wentworth Day
- My Life at the Sunbeam 1920–1935, Norman Cliff
- Motor Racing Memories 1903–1921 W F Bradley, 1960
- Targa Florio W F Bradley
- Motoring Entente, Ian Nickols and Kent Karslake, 1956
- The Classic Twin-Cam Engine, Griffith Borgeson, 1981
- Flat to the Boards A history of Motor Car Sport in New Zealand From 1901 to 1940, Dick Messenger and Douglas E Wood, 1985
- The Strasbourg Sunbeam, Neville S Webb, 2006
- A classic world and when the engine roars: a tale of three T.T. sunbeams, 1999, G Begg
- The Racing Zborowskis: David Willson
- The British Competition Car, Cyril Posthumus, 1959
- Carbooks Volume 22 1922, Michael Frostick (editor)
- Directory of Historic Racing Cars, Denis Jenkinson, 1987
- Fifty Years with the Speed Kings, David McDonald (Dunlop Mac), 1961
- The French Grand Prix, Hodges, 1967
- The Lonsdale Library Motor Racing, Earl Howe & Many Authorities
- Racing Cars Between 1919 and 1939, T.A.S.O. Mathieson, 1963
- Racing Cars and Record Breakers 1898–1921, T R Nicholson, 1971
- The Roaring Twenties, Cyril Posthumus, 1980
- Sir Henry Segrave, Cyril Posthumus, 1961
- The Vanishing Litres, Rex Hays, 1957
- The Vintage Motor Car, Cecil Clutton and John Stanford, 1954
- Wall Smacker, Peter De Paolo, 1935
- Shelsley Walsh, England's International Speed Hill-Climb, C. A. N. May, 1945
- The Encyclopedia of Motor Sport Edited by G N Georgano 1971
- T.T. Pioneers, Robert Kelly, 1996
- British Racing Green, Drivers, Cars and Triumphs of British Motor Racing David Venables, 2008
- Under My Bonnet, G. R. N. Minchin, 1950
- The Racing Zborowskis, David Wilson, 2002
- Tourist Trophy, The History of Britain's Greatest Motor Race, Richard Hough, 1957
- The History and Development of the Sunbeam Car 1899–1924, The Sunbeam Motor Car Company limited, 1924
- Historic Racing Cars of New Zealand, Graham Vercoe, 1991
- Famous Racing Cars, David Hodges
- Great Racing Drivers, edited by David Hodges, 1966
- The French Grand Prix, David Hodges
- Grand Prix and Sports Cars, Drawn by Res Hays
- Seventeen Sports Cars 1919–1930, Peter Hull and Nigel Arnold-Foster

=== Magazines and publications ===
- Auto 1922 June 29
- Autocar, 1921; 26 March, 9 July, 6 August
- Autocar 1922 March 25, 27 May, 3 June, 17 June, 24 June, 1 July, 7 July, 14 July, 21 July, 1 December
- Autocar 1930 April 25
- Autocar 1982 Aug 1922 TT Sunbeam
- Automobile 2009 (April)
- Automobile 2011 June Partying Shot David Burgess-Wise
- Automobillia 1921
- Automobile Connoisseur – The 1921/22 Grand Prix Sunbeam, Peter Hull
- Auto Motor sport 1922 July 13, 20 July
- Beaded Wheels, 'A wolf in sheep's clothing', Dick Messenger June 1957
- Beaded Wheels, 'The Henri Sunbeams', A R E Messenger 1971
- Bonham's Auction entry, Keith Taylor, 2009
- L’automobiliste no. 23, Jean Chassagne, Robert Jarraud, Mai/Juin 1971
- Les Miroir des Sports 1922
- The Light Car and Cyclecar 1921 October 29
- Motor 1922 May 17, 21 June, 18 July
- Motor Sport, April 1938
- Motor Sport 1940 December
- Motor Sport 1942 October
- Cecil Clutton (March 1948). "A 1922 T.T. Sunbeam". Motor Sport.
- Motor Sport 1949 January Motor Sport 1986 May
- Octane 2014 September Omnia 1921 September no.16 Omnia 1922 Aout no. 27 Rapiditas Vol5 1922–1923 Sportscar March 1950
- S.T.D. Journal no118 January 1985
- Veteran And Vintage Magazine, William Boddy Vol.15 no.11 1971 July
- VSCC Bulletin no 105 'How They Go' C Clutton pp. 6–7 1970
- VSCC Bulletin summer & autumn, Jean Chassagne & Ernest Henry, Oliver Heal, 2002

=== Further references ===
- The Beaulieu Photographic and Document Library and archive
- Bibliothèque Nationale de France collection
- The TASO Mathieson & K Taylor Photographic and Document Archive courtesy Keith Taylor
- R.A.C. archive
- New Zealand S.T.D. Register Archives
- Brookland Archive
- New Zealand V.C.C. Archives
- The Shand Archive
- The V.S.C.C. photographic and Document Library and Archive
- Famous Racing Cars, David Hodges
- Great Racing Drivers, edited by David Hodges, 1966
- The French Grand Prix, David Hodges
- Grand Prix and Sports Cars, Drawn by Res Hays
- Seventeen Sports Cars 1919–1930, Peter Hull and Nigel Arnold-Foster

=== Internet sources ===
- 1921 Grand Prix Sunbeam – YouTube
- Sunbeam Talbot Darracq Register
- Bibliothèque nationale de France
- LAT Photographic Archive
- Austin Harris
- Art And The French Grand Prix 1921 D Doyle frenchgp1921.pdf
- Grand Prix History
- Grand Prix Sunbeams – YouTube
- New Zealand Papers Past
