= Alphi =

French car manufacturer (1929–1931)

Alphi was a car manufacturer in France from 1929 to 1931. Only four cars were made.

The name Alphi was short for Automobiles du Luart, Poniatowski, Hougardy, Ingėnieurs. The three engineers set up their business in the rue de l'Universitė in the 7th arrondissement of Paris.

The first two cars sat on a 2,600 mm (102.4 in) wheelbase and used a 6-cylinder side-valve 1485 cc C.I.M.E. engine. They came with a stylish racing body incorporating two seats, positioned side by side. One raced at the 1929 24 Hours of Le Mans, driven by Sosthènes de La Rochefoucauld but it retired during its 45th lap and never returned to the Le Mans circuit. The other was supercharged in anticipation for the 1929 French Grand Prix (which that year was held at the Le Mans circuit on 30 June): however it was not ready in time for the race and did not participate. It was notably heavy for the available power.

The other two were touring cars, powered by Continental engines, one a 2.6-litre 6-cylinder and the other a 5.0-litre 8-cylinder. They had an independent rear suspension with transverse rear axles, and rigid front axles.

Only two Alphis were surviving as of 1968; the supercharged race car and the 6-cylinder touring car, and as of 2025, only 1 survives, that being the race car, as the Touring was destroyed in a fire as of 1996.

== Models ==
Years	Model	Engine	Displacement	Horsepower	HP RPM	Torque	Torque RPM	Weight
1928	T10 Le Mans	I6 Supercharged (C.I.M.E.)	1,485 cc (90.6 cu in; 1.485 L)	50 bhp (51 PS; 37 kW)	2,500	50 lb⋅ft (68 N⋅m)	1,000	2,355 lb (1,068 kg)
1929	T10 Grand Prix	I6 (Continental)	2,600 cc (160 cu in; 2.6 L)	65 bhp (66 PS; 48 kW)	3,200	80 lb⋅ft (110 N⋅m)	1,600	2,500 lb (1,100 kg)
1928–1929	T10 Touring 48/50 HP	I6 Supercharged (C.I.M.E.)	1,485 cc (90.6 cu in; 1.485 L)	50 bhp (51 PS; 37 kW)	2,500	50 lb⋅ft (68 N⋅m)	1,000	2,750 lb (1,250 kg)
1929–1931	T10 Touring 65/80 HP	I8 (Continental)	4,993 cc (304.7 cu in; 4.993 L)	82 bhp (83 PS; 61 kW)	3,000	145 lb⋅ft (197 N⋅m)	2,000	3,400 lb (1,500 kg)
