= André Boillot =

French racing driver (1891–1932)

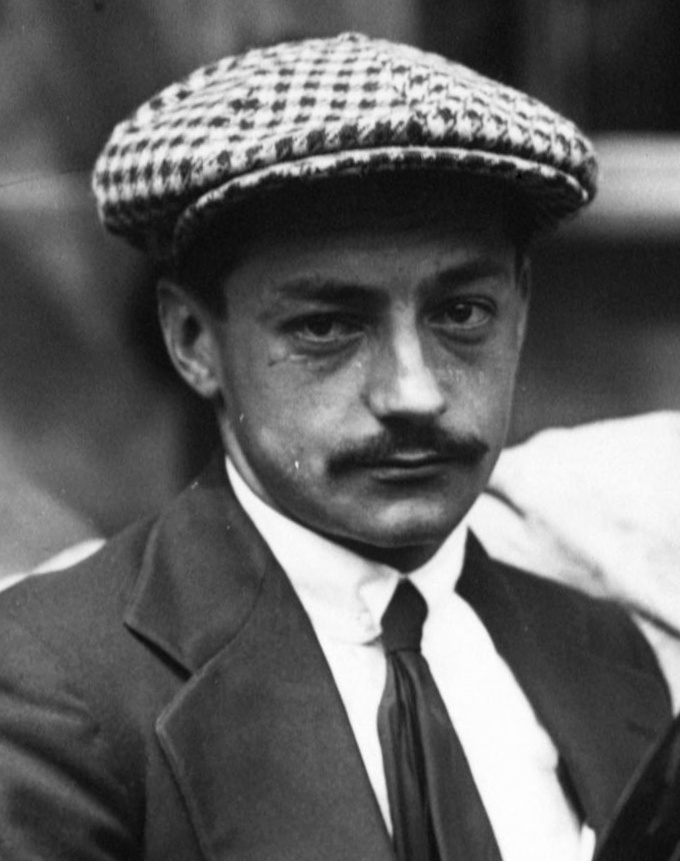
- Boillot at the 1914 French Grand Prix
- Born: André Jacques Boillot; 8 August 1891 Valentigney, Doubs, France
- Died: 8 June 1932 (aged 40) Châteauroux, Indre, France

Champ Car career
- 3 races run over 3 years
- First race: 1919 Indianapolis 500 (Indianapolis)
- Last race: 1921 Indianapolis 500 (Indianapolis)
Wins	Podiums	Poles
0	0	0

24 Hours of Le Mans career
- Years: 1926
- Teams: Peugeot
- Best finish: DSQ (1926)
- Class wins: 0

André Jacques Boillot (8 August 1891 – 8 June 1932) was a French racing driver. Born in Valentigney, Doubs, he was the younger brother of race car driver, Georges Boillot. Following in his brother's footsteps, André Boillot began racing cars at a young age. However, World War I not only disrupted his career but claimed the life of his brother in 1916.

After the war, Boillot returned to racing as part of the Peugeot factory team and drove their EXS model to victory in the 1919 Targa Florio. Boillot's finish was unique, as he had crashed just around 30 meters before the line in a grandstand, in order to avoid spectators standing on the road. Dazed and exhausted, Boillot freed his car from the debris and crossed the finish line in reverse. He then had cross the finish line again, this time in the right direction, in order to avoid a potential disqualification.

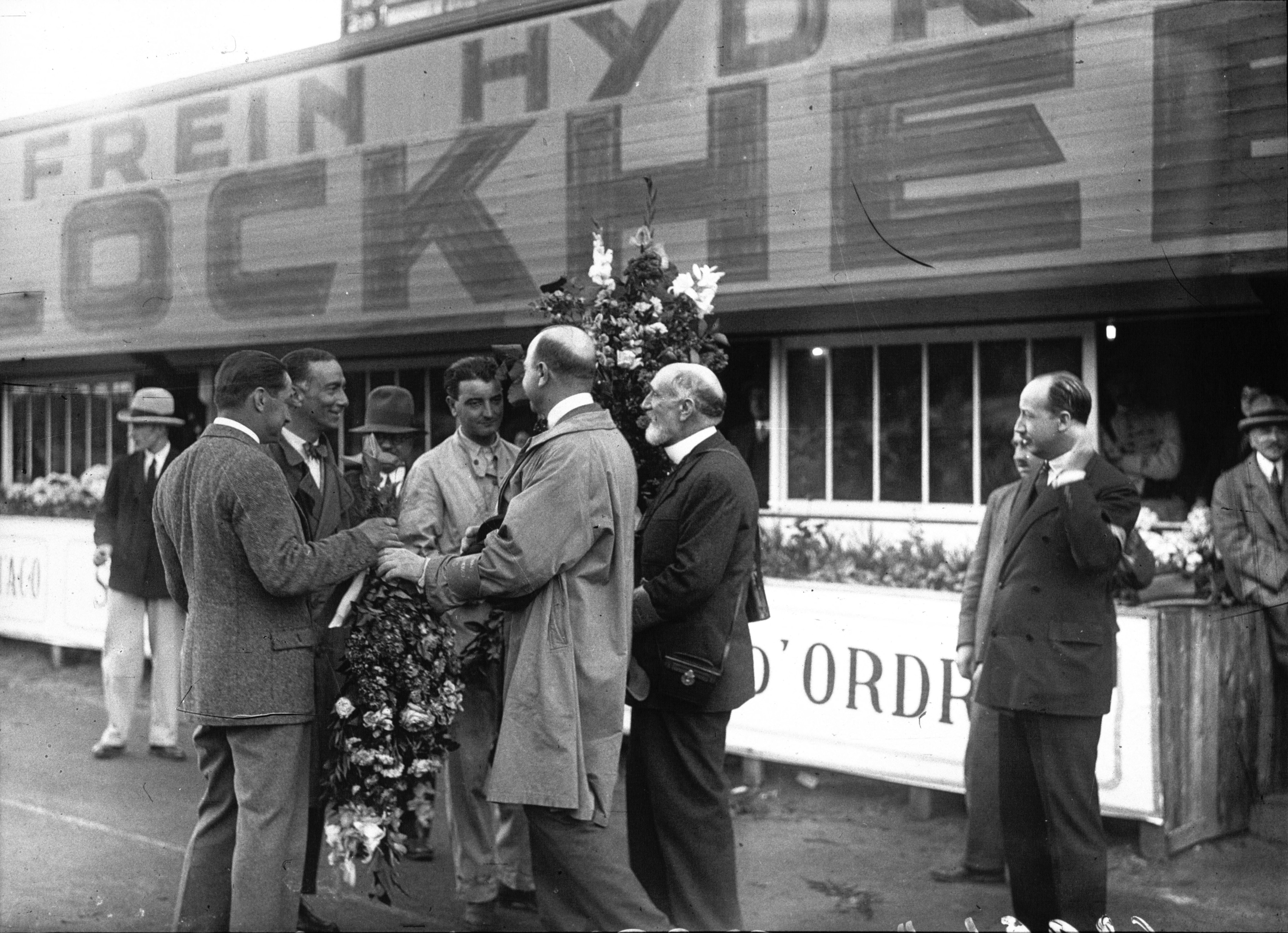
Boillot at the 1929 French Grand Prix

French drivers had been a major force since the inception of the Indianapolis 500 in the United States, and Boillot was part of a large post-war contingent of entrants from France. He competed at the Indianapolis Motor Speedway in the 1919 "500," and was in the thick of things when he crashed with only five laps remaining. He returned to race in the event in 1920 and 1921 but both times went out early with mechanical problems. In Europe, he won the 1922 and 1925 editions of the Coppa Florio and in 1926 he and co-pilot Louis Rigal won the Spa 24 Hours in Belgium.

Boillot was driving a Peugeot 201 when he crashed during practice for the 1932 Ars hillclimbing race at La Châtre. He died in a nearby hospital a few days later from his injuries.

== Motorsports career results ==
=== Indianapolis 500 results ===
Year	Car	Start	Qual	Rank	Finish	Laps	Led	Retired
1919	37	32	89.500	32	15	195	0	Crash BS
1920	17	16	85.400	17	23	16	0	Engine trouble
1921	14	11	97.600	3	20	41	0	Rod bearing
Totals						252	0	

Starts	3
Poles	0
Front Row	0
Wins	0
Top 5	0
Top 10	0
Retired	3
