= Peugeot Type 174 =

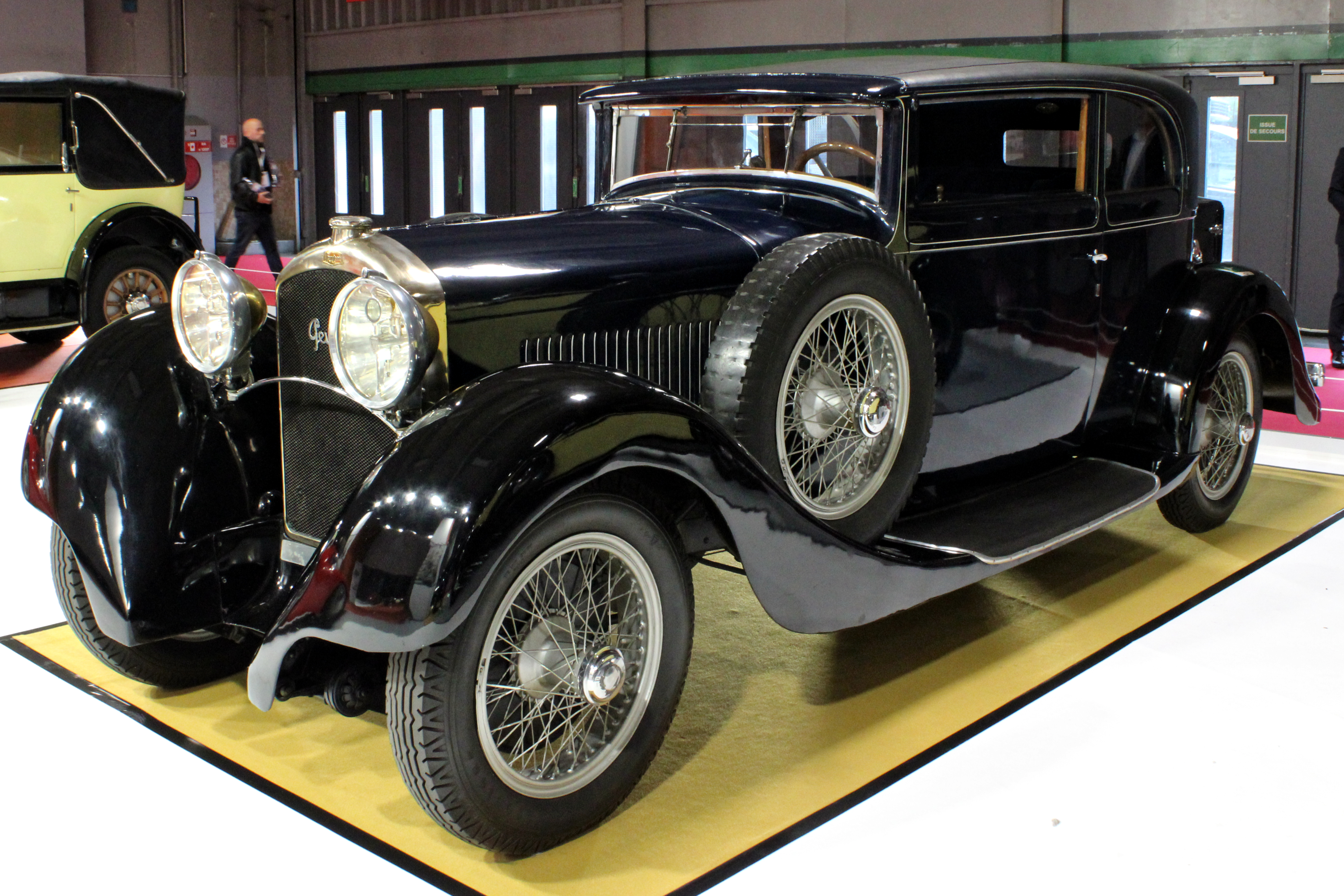

Overview
- Manufacturer: S. A. des Automobiles Peugeot
- Production: 1923–1928; 1018 produced

Powertrain
- Engine: 3.8 L I4

Dimensions
- Wheelbase: 3,270 mm (128.7 in) (e.g. for sports bodies). 3,500 mm (137.8 in) (for standard bodies).
- Length: 4,460 mm (175.6 in) (typically)

Chronology
- Predecessor: Peugeot Type 145
- Successor: Peugeot 601

The Peugeot Type 174, also known at the time and normally advertised simply according to its fiscal horse power as the Peugeot 18HP, was a large, powerful sedan made by Peugeot from 1923 to 1926. The Type 174 S was made until 1926. The engine displaced 3828 cc, large and low-revving for a four-cylinder engine, and produced a considerable 85 horsepower at 1900 rpm. The sport version sold 208 examples compared to 810 for the standard version.

In October 1924 at the 19th Paris Motor Show the price quoted by the manufacturer for a Peugeot Type 174 in bare chassis form was 54,000 francs. The sport version was priced in bare chassis form at 56,000 francs.
