= As =

As, AS, A. S., A/S or similar may refer to:

== Art, entertainment, and media ==
- A. S. Byatt (born 1936), English critic, novelist, poet and short story writer
- Adult Swim, a programming block on Cartoon Network
- Akademiska Sångföreningen, an academic male voice choir of Helsinki, Finland
- As (newspaper), a Spanish sports newspaper
- "As" (song), by Stevie Wonder
- As, a 1896 novel by Adolf Dygasiński
- As the Dog, a sculpture in Warsaw, Poland

== Business legal structures ==
- Akciová společnost (a.s.), a Czech form of joint-stock company
- Akciová spoločnosť (a.s.), a Slovak form of joint-stock company
- Aktieselskab or A/S, a type of Danish stock-based company
- Aksjeselskap or AS, a type of Norwegian stock-based company

== Businesses and organizations ==
=== Sports teams and leagues ===
- A.S. Roma, an Italian football club
- Amateurliga Saarland, highest football league in the state of Saarland (defunct)
- KK AS Basket, a Serbian basketball club
- Athletics (baseball), an American baseball team referred to as the A's

=== Transportation companies ===
- Alaska Airlines, IATA airline designator
  - Hawaiian Airlines, IATA airline designator that began in 2025 as part of merger with Alaska Airlines
- Voiturettes Automobiles A.S., a French-based car manufacturer in 1920s
- Towarzystwo Budowy Samochodów AS, a Poland-based car manufacturer in 1920s and 1930s

=== Other organizations ===
- Academia Sinica, the national academy of Taiwan
- Armée secrète (Belgium), a World War II resistance organization
- Armée secrète, a French resistance organization
- Akademiska Sångföreningen, an academic male voice choir of Helsinki, Finland
- United List (Apvienotais saraksts), Latvian political party

== Vehicles ==
- AS Type A2, a sports car manufactured by Voiturettes Automobiles A.S.
- AS S1 and AS S2, a passenger car manufactured by Towarzystwo Budowy Samochodów AS
- Submarine tender (AS), a hull classification symbol for a kind of US Navy auxiliary ship

== Academia ==
- Academia Sinica, the national academy of Taiwan
- AS-level (disambiguation)
- Associate of Science, an American academic degree

== Language ==
- As language, a language of West Papua, Indonesia
- Assamese language of India (ISO 639-1 code "as")
- As (cuneiform), a written character
- Aš (cuneiform), a written character

== Mathematics, science and technology ==
=== Computing ===
- as (Unix), an assembler program
- .as, the Internet country code top-level domain for American Samoa
- ActionScript, for Flash and Flex applications
- Autonomous system (Internet), a collection of IP routing prefixes
- Application server, a computer running back-end software
- The type conversion operator as, used in C# and Rust

=== Health and medicine ===
- Angelman syndrome, a neuro-genetic disorder
- Ankylosing spondylitis, a type of spinal arthritis
- Aortic stenosis, a valvular heart disease
- Asparagine synthase (glutamine-hydrolysing), an enzyme
- Asperger syndrome, a psychological diagnosis
- Auricular splint, a custom-made medical device used as part of ear surgery

=== Natural sciences ===
- Altostratus, a kind of cloud
- Arsenic, a chemical element
- Tropical savanna climate

=== Units of measurement ===
- Arcsecond, 1/3600 of a degree, a unit of angular measurement
- Attosecond (as), 10^{−18} second, a subunit of time
- Attosiemens (aS), 10^{−18} siemens, a subunit of electric conductance

=== Other uses in mathematics, science and technology ===
- Abramowitz and Stegun, an informal name for the 1964 Handbook of Mathematical Functions with Formulas, Graphs, and Mathematical Tables
- Aggregate supply, in economics, the total supply of goods
- Almost surely, in probability theory

== Places ==
=== Europe ===
- Aš, a town in the Czech Republic
- Ås, Akershus, Norway
- As, Belgium, in Limburg
- Ås, Sør-Trøndelag, Norway
- Ås, Swedish name for the Harju quarter in Helsinki, Finland
- As, Ukraine (formerly known as Proletarka), a village in Ukraine

=== Asia ===
- As-e Jadid (اس جديد, "New As"), a village in East Azerbaijan Province, Iran
- As-e Qadim (اس قديم, "Old As"), a village in East Azerbaijan Province, Iran
- Assam, a state of India

=== Countries ===
- American Samoa (ISO 3166 code AS)
- Australia (obsolete NATO and FIPS country codes AS)
- United States (abbreviated "AS" in Indonesian)

== Religion ==
- Æsir (singular: ás, áss, ǫ́ss), one of the pantheon of Norse gods
- ʿAlayhi s-salām (عليه السلام), Arabic for "Peace be upon him", post-nominal posthumous Islamic honorific

== Other uses ==
- As (Roman coin), a coin and unit of weight
- Anno Societatis (A.S.), a calendar system used by the Society for Creative Anachronism
- Anti-submarine warfare (A/S)
- Australian Standards, the technical standards developed by Standards Australia
- Old name for Ossetians, "As" or "Asi"

== See also ==
- Aas (surname)
- Ass (disambiguation)
