= 1930 Monza Grand Prix =

Race details
- Date: 7 September 1930
- Official name: III Gran Premio di Monza
- Location: Autodromo Nazionale di Monza; Monza, Italy
- Course: Permanent racing facility
- Course length: 6.861 km (4.263 miles)
- Distance: 35 laps, 240.14 km (149.21 miles)
- Weather: Overcast, hot

Pole position
Driver	(Italy) Tazio Nuvolari	Alfa Romeo

Fastest lap
Driver	(Italy) Achille Varzi	Maserati
- Time: 2:30.0

Podium
First	(Italy) Achille Varzi	Maserati
Second	(Italy) Luigi Arcangeli	Maserati
Third	(Italy) Ernesto Maserati	Maserati

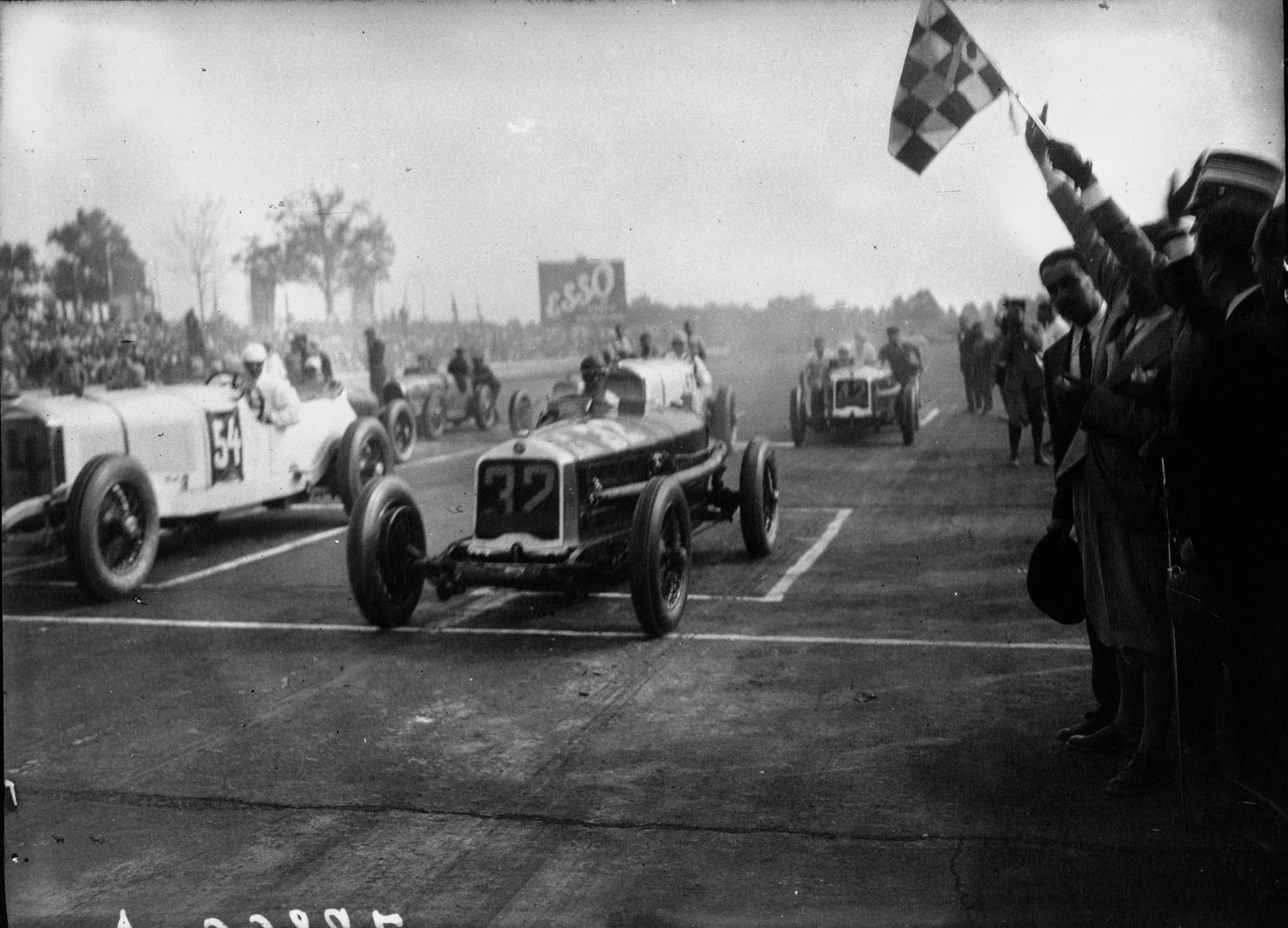
Race start

The 1930 Monza Grand Prix was a Grand Prix motor race held at the Autodromo Nazionale di Monza on 7 September 1930. There were four 14-lap heats (separated by class), a 7-lap repêchage, and a 35-lap final, which was won by Achille Varzi in a Maserati. His teammates, Luigi Arcangeli and Ernesto Maserati, completed the podium.

== Entries ==
=== 1500 cc to 2000 cc ===
No	Driver	Entrant	Constructor	Chassis	Engine
2	Raffaelli Toti	Private entry	Maserati	Maserati 26	2.0 L8
4	Arrigo Sartorio	Private entry	Maserati	Maserati 26B	1.7 L8
6	(Italy) Antonio Brivio	Scuderia Materassi	Talbot	Talbot 700	1.5 L8
8	Avattaneo	Private entry	Bugatti	Bugatti T35C	2.0 L8
10	(Switzerland) Carlo Pedrazzini	Private entry	Maserati	Maserati 26B	1.5 L8
11	(France) Philippe Étancelin	Private entry	Bugatti	Bugatti T35C	2.0 L8
12	(Italy) Clemente Biondetti	Scuderia Materassi	Talbot	Talbot 700	1.5 L8
14	Giovanni Tabacci	Private entry	Bugatti	Bugatti T35C	2.0 L8
16	(Germany) Heinrich Joachim von Morgen	German Bugatti Team	Bugatti	Bugatti T35C	2.0 L8
18	(France) Max Fourny	Private entry	Bugatti	Bugatti T35C	2.0 L8
20	(Italy) Giovanni Minozzi	Private entry	Bugatti	Bugatti T35C	2.0 L8

=== 2000 cc to 3000 cc ===
No	Driver	Entrant	Constructor	Chassis	Engine
22	(France) Marcel Lehoux	Private entry	Bugatti	Bugatti T35B	2.3 L8
24	(France) Philippe Étancelin	Private entry	Bugatti	Bugatti T35C	2.0 L8
26	(Italy) Achille Varzi	Officine Alfieri Maserati	Maserati	Maserati 26M	2.5 L8
28	(Germany) Ernst Günther Burggaller	German Bugatti Team	Bugatti	Bugatti T35B	2.3 L8
30	(Italy) Luigi Arcangeli	Officine Alfieri Maserati	Maserati	Maserati 26M	2.5 L8
32	(Italy) Tazio Nuvolari	Scuderia Ferrari	Alfa Romeo	Alfa Romeo P2	2.0 L8
34	(Italy) Luigi Fagioli	Officine Alfieri Maserati	Maserati	Maserati 26M	2.5 L8
36	Mario Dafarra	Private entry	Bugatti	Bugatti T35B	2.3 L8
38	Ugo Stefanelli	Private entry	Bugatti	Bugatti T35B	2.3 L8
40	(Germany) Heinrich Joachim von Morgen	German Bugatti Team	Bugatti	Bugatti T35B	2.3 L8
42	(Italy) Baconin Borzacchini	Scuderia Ferrari	Alfa Romeo	Alfa Romeo P2	2.0 L8
44	Heinz Ipse	Private entry	Bugatti	Bugatti T35	2.0 L8
46	(Italy) Giuseppe Campari	Scuderia Ferrari	Alfa Romeo	Alfa Romeo P2	2.0 L8

=== Over 3000 cc ===
No	Driver	Entrant	Constructor	Chassis	Engine
48	(Italy) Ernesto Maserati	Officine Alfieri Maserati	Maserati	Maserati V4	4.0 2x8
50	(United States) Babe Stapp	Private entry	Duesenberg	Duesenberg A	4.2 L8
52	(Germany) Rudolf Caracciola	Daimler-Benz AG	Mercedes-Benz	Mercedes-Benz SSK	7.1 L6
54	Federico Caflisch	Private entry	Mercedes-Benz	Mercedes-Benz SS	7.1 L6
56	(Italy) Amedeo Ruggeri	Private entry	Itala	?	4.7 L4

=== Up to 1100 cc ===
No	Driver	Entrant	Constructor	Chassis	Engine
58	?	?	Amilcar	?	1.1
60	(Italy) Umberto Klinger	Private entry	Maserati	Maserati 26C	1.1 L8
62	(Italy) Mario Moradei	Private entry	Salmson	?	1.1
64	(Germany) Gerhard Macher	Private entry	DKW	DKW RWD	1.0 L4
66	(Italy) Luigi Premoli	Private entry	Salmson	?	1.1 L8
68	?	?	Amilcar	?	1.1
70	(Italy) Abele Clerici	Private entry	Salmson	?	1.1
72	(Germany) Hans Simons	Private entry	DKW	DKW FWD	1.0 L4
74	(Italy) Albino Pratesi	Private entry	Salmson	?	1.1
76	(Italy) Emilio Romano	Private entry	Bugatti	Bugatti T36	1.1 L8
78	(France) Victor Marret	Private entry	Salmson	?	1.1
80	(Italy) Alfieri Maserati	Officine Alfieri Maserati	Maserati	Maserati 26C	1.1 L8
82	(Italy) Aldo Gerardi	Private entry	Amilcar	?	1.1
84	Ruggiero Bisighin	Filippo Ardizzone	Maserati	Maserati 26C	1.1 L8
86	(Italy) Luigi Platé	Private entry	Lombard	?	1.1
88	(France) Emile Dourel	Private entry	Amilcar	Amilcar CO	1.1 L6
90	Martinatti	Private entry	Salmson	?	1.1
92	(Italy) Piero Bucci	Private entry	Lombard	?	1.1
94	(Italy) Francesco Matrullo	Private entry	Amilcar	?	1.1 L6
96	(France) Louis Decaroli	Private entry	Salmson	?	1.1
98	(France) José Scaron	Private entry	Amilcar	Amilcar MCO	1.1 L6
100	(Italy) Sergio Carnevali	Private entry	Rally	?	1.1
102	(Switzerland) Luciano Uboldi	Private entry	Lombard	?	1.1
104	Dini	Private entry	Amilcar	?	1.1
106	Rolly	Private entry	Derby	?	1.1
108	Ipsale	Private entry	Derby	?	1.1
110	Ruggiero Bisighin	Private entry	Amilcar	?	1.1

== Heat 1 (1500 cc to 2000 cc) ==
=== Starting grid ===
Starting grid — Heat one, 1930 Monza Grand Prix
Sartorio; Maserati				
Sartorio; Maserati	(Italy) Brivio; Talbot			
	(Italy) Brivio; Talbot	Avattaneo; Bugatti		
		Avattaneo; Bugatti	(Switzerland) Pedrazzini; Maserati	
			(Switzerland) Pedrazzini; Maserati	(France) Étancelin; Bugatti
(Italy) Biondetti; Talbot				
(Italy) Biondetti; Talbot	Tabacci; Bugatti			
	Tabacci; Bugatti	(Germany) von Morgen; Bugatti		
		(Germany) von Morgen; Bugatti	(France) Fourny; Bugatti	
			(France) Fourny; Bugatti	(Italy) Minozzi; Bugatti

=== Classification ===
Pos	No	Driver	Car	Laps	Time/Retired	Grid
1	11	(France) Philippe Étancelin	Bugatti T35C	14	38:30.0	5
2	16	(Germany) Heinrich Joachim von Morgen	Bugatti T35C	14	+2.2	8
3	20	(Italy) Giovanni Minozzi	Bugatti T35C	14	+31.2	10
4	10	(Switzerland) Carlo Pedrazzini	Maserati 26B	14	+57.2	4
5	12	(Italy) Clemente Biondetti	Talbot 700	14	+1:47.4	6
6	4	Arrigo Sartorio	Maserati 26B	14	+2:08.6	1
7	18	(France) Max Fourny	Bugatti T35C	14	+2:10.2	9
8	11	Avattaneo	Bugatti T35C	14	+2:16.8	3
Ret	14	Giovanni Tabacci	Bugatti T35C	12		7
Ret	6	(Italy) Antonio Brivio	Talbot 700	10		2
DNA	2	Raffaelli Toti	Maserati 26		Did not appear	

- Positions 1-4 progressed to the final; positions 5-8 were eligible for the repêchage.

== Heat 2 (2000 cc to 3000 cc) ==
=== Starting grid ===
Starting grid — Heat two, 1930 Monza Grand Prix
(France) Lehoux; Bugatti				
(France) Lehoux; Bugatti	(Italy) Varzi; Maserati			
	(Italy) Varzi; Maserati	(Germany) Burggaller; Bugatti		
		(Germany) Burggaller; Bugatti	(Italy) Arcangeli; Maserati	
			(Italy) Arcangeli; Maserati	(Italy) Nuvolari; Alfa Romeo
(Italy) Fagioli; Maserati				
(Italy) Fagioli; Maserati	Dafarra; Bugatti			
	Dafarra; Bugatti	Stefanelli; Bugatti		
		Stefanelli; Bugatti	(Italy) Borzacchini; Alfa Romeo	
			(Italy) Borzacchini; Alfa Romeo	(Italy) Campari; Alfa Romeo

=== Classification ===
Pos	No	Driver	Car	Laps	Time/Retired	Grid
1	30	(Italy) Luigi Arcangeli	Maserati 26M	14	36:36.2	4
2	42	(Italy) Baconin Borzacchini	Alfa Romeo P2	14	+43.4	9
3	34	(Italy) Luigi Fagioli	Maserati 26M	14	+1:03.2	6
4	26	(Italy) Achille Varzi	Maserati 26M	14	+1:29.6	2
5	32	(Italy) Tazio Nuvolari	Alfa Romeo P2	14	+1:43.2	5
6	36	Mario Dafarra	Bugatti T35B	14	+3:33.8	7
7	22	(France) Marcel Lehoux	Bugatti T35B	14	+3:42.2	1
8	46	(Italy) Giuseppe Campari	Alfa Romeo P2	14	+6:02.0	10
Ret	28	(Germany) Ernst Günther Burggaller	Bugatti T35B	1	Engine	3
Ret	38	Ugo Stefanelli	Bugatti T35B	0		8
DNA	44	Heinz Ipse	Bugatti T35		Did not appear	

- Philippe Étancelin and Heinrich Joachim von Morgen were entered in this class, but raced in Heat 1 instead;
- Positions 1-4 progressed to the final; positions 5-8 were eligible for the repêchage.

== Heat 3 (over 3000 cc) ==
=== Starting grid ===
Starting grid — Heat three, 1930 Monza Grand Prix
(Italy) E. Maserati; Maserati				
(Italy) E. Maserati; Maserati	(United States) Stapp; Duesenberg			
	(United States) Stapp; Duesenberg	(Germany) Caracciola; Mercedes-Benz		
		(Germany) Caracciola; Mercedes-Benz	Caflisch; Mercedes-Benz	
			Caflisch; Mercedes-Benz	(Italy) Ruggeri; Itala

=== Classification ===
Pos	No	Driver	Car	Laps	Time/Retired	Grid
1	48	(Italy) Ernesto Maserati	Maserati V4	14	39:25.4	1
2	52	(Germany) Rudolf Caracciola	Mercedes-Benz SSK	14	+24.0	3
3	50	(United States) Babe Stapp	Duesenberg A	14	+1:40.4	2
4	54	Federico Caflisch	Mercedes-Benz SS	14	+3:54.4	4
5	56	(Italy) Amedeo Ruggeri	Itala	14	+4:14.6	5

- Positions 1-4 progressed to the final; position 5 was eligible for the repêchage.

== Repêchage ==
=== Starting grid ===
Starting grid — Repêchage, 1930 Monza Grand Prix
Sartorio; Maserati				
Sartorio; Maserati	(France) Lehoux; Bugatti			
	(France) Lehoux; Bugatti	(Italy) Nuvolari; Alfa Romeo		
		(Italy) Nuvolari; Alfa Romeo	Dafarra; Bugatti	
			Dafarra; Bugatti	(Italy) Campari; Alfa Romeo

=== Classification ===
Pos	No	Driver	Heat	Car	Laps	Time/Retired	Grid
1	32	(Italy) Tazio Nuvolari	2	Alfa Romeo P2	7	20:01.0	3
2	46	(Italy) Giuseppe Campari	2	Alfa Romeo P2	7	+0.4	5
3	4	Arrigo Sartorio	1	Maserati 26B	7	+3.6	1
4	36	Mario Dafarra	2	Bugatti T35B	7	+2:41.0	4
Ret	22	(France) Marcel Lehoux	2	Bugatti T35B	3	Crash	2

- Positions 1-2 progressed to the final.

== Heat 4 (voiturettes - up to 1100 cc) ==
=== Starting grid ===
Starting grid — Heat four, 1930 Monza Grand Prix
(Italy) Klinger; Maserati				
(Italy) Klinger; Maserati	(Germany) Macher; DKW			
	(Germany) Macher; DKW	(Italy) Premoli; Salmson		
		(Italy) Premoli; Salmson	(Italy) Clerici; Salmson	
			(Italy) Clerici; Salmson	(Germany) Simons; DKW
(Italy) Pratesi; Salmson				
(Italy) Pratesi; Salmson	(Italy) Romano; Bugatti			
	(Italy) Romano; Bugatti	(Italy) A. Maserati; Maserati		
		(Italy) A. Maserati; Maserati	(Italy) Gerardi; Amilcar	
			(Italy) Gerardi; Amilcar	Bisighin; Maserati
(Italy) Platé; Lombard				
(Italy) Platé; Lombard	(France) Dourel; Amilcar			
	(France) Dourel; Amilcar	(Italy) Bucci; Lombard		
		(Italy) Bucci; Lombard	(France) Decaroli; Salmson	
			(France) Decaroli; Salmson	(France) Scaron; Amilcar
(Italy) Carnevali; Rally				

=== Classification ===
Pos	No	Driver	Car	Laps	Time/Retired	Grid
1	66	(Italy) Luigi Premoli	Salmson	14	43:37.0	3
2	98	(France) José Scaron	Amilcar MCO	14	+5.4	15
3	60	(Italy) Umberto Klinger	Maserati 26C	14	+2:17.6	1
4	80	(Italy) Alfiero Maserati	Maserati 26C	14	+2:27.0	8
5	88	(France) Emile Dourel	Amilcar CO	14	+2:32.6	12
6	70	(Italy) Abele Clerici	Salmson	14	+4:49.6	4
7	86	(Italy) Luigi Platé	Lombard	14	+5:14.0	11
8	72	(Germany) Hans Simons	DKW FWD	14	+6:26.2	5
9	64	(Germany) Gerhard Macher	DKW RWD	14	+6:41.4	2
10	82	(Italy) Aldo Gerardi	Amilcar	14	+8:30.2	9
Ret	74	(Italy) Albino Pratesi	Salmson	13		6
Ret	96	(France) Louis Decaroli	Salmson	13		14
Ret	84	Ruggiero Bisighin	Maserati 26C	11		10
Ret	76	(Italy) Emilio Romano	Bugatti T36	10		7
Ret	92	(Italy) Piero Bucci	Lombard	3		13
Ret	100	(Italy) Sergio Carnevali	Rally	3		16
DNA	58	?	Amilcar		Did not appear	
DNA	62	(Italy) Mario Moradei	Salmson		Did not appear	
DNA	68	?	Amilcar		Did not appear	
DNA	78	(France) Victor Marret	Salmson		Did not appear	
DNA	90	Martinatti	Salmson		Did not appear	
DNA	94	(Italy) Francesco Matrullo	Amilcar		Did not appear	
DNA	102	(Switzerland) Luciano Uboldi	Lombard		Did not appear	
DNA	104	Dini	Amilcar		Did not appear	
DNA	106	Rolly	Derby		Did not appear	
DNA	108	Ipsale	Derby		Did not appear	

- Positions 1-2 progressed to the final.

== Final ==
=== Starting grid ===
Starting grid — Final, 1930 Monza Grand Prix
(Italy) Nuvolari; Alfa Romeo				
(Italy) Nuvolari; Alfa Romeo	Caflisch; Mercedes-Benz			
	Caflisch; Mercedes-Benz	(Italy) Campari; Alfa Romeo		
		(Italy) Campari; Alfa Romeo	(Italy) Minozzi; Bugatti	
			(Italy) Minozzi; Bugatti	(United States) Stapp; Duesenberg
(Germany) Caracciola; Mercedes-Benz				
(Germany) Caracciola; Mercedes-Benz	(Italy) Varzi; Maserati			
	(Italy) Varzi; Maserati	(Italy) E. Maserati; Maserati		
		(Italy) E. Maserati; Maserati	(Italy) Arcangeli; Maserati	
			(Italy) Arcangeli; Maserati	(Switzerland) Pedrazzini; Maserati
^{A}				
^{A}	^{A}			
	^{A}	^{A}		
		^{A}	(Germany) von Morgen; Bugatti	
			(Germany) von Morgen; Bugatti	^{A}

^A — Philippe Étancelin (Bugatti), Luigi Fagioli (Maserati), Baconin Borzacchini (Alfa Romeo), and José Scaron (Amilcar) all started from the third row of the grid, but their specific positions are unknown.

=== Classification ===
Pos	No	Driver	Heat	Car	Laps	Time/Retired	Grid
1	26	(Italy) Achille Varzi	2	Maserati 26M	35	1:35:46.2	7
2	30	(Italy) Luigi Arcangeli	2	Maserati 26M	35	+0.2	9
3	48	(Italy) Ernesto Maserati	3	Maserati V4	35	+24.2	8
4	20	(Italy) Giovanni Minozzi	1	Bugatti T35C	35	+3:37.0	4
5	34	(Italy) Luigi Fagioli	2	Maserati 26M	35	+3:37.4	?
6	11	(France) Philippe Étancelin	1	Bugatti T35C	35	+4:03.6	?
7	52	(Germany) Rudolf Caracciola	3	Mercedes-Benz SSK	35	+7:13.8	6
8	50	(United States) Babe Stapp	3	Duesenberg A	34	+1 lap	5
9	54	Federico Caflisch	3	Mercedes-Benz SS	33	+2 laps	2
10	98	(France) José Scaron	4	Amilcar MCO	32	+3 laps	?
Ret	10	(Switzerland) Carlo Pedrazzini	1	Maserati 26B	18	Lost wheel	10
Ret	16	(Germany) Heinrich Joachim von Morgen	1	Bugatti T35C	10	Tyres	14
Ret	42	(Italy) Baconin Borzacchini	2	Alfa Romeo P2	8	Tyres	?
Ret	32	(Italy) Tazio Nuvolari	2	Alfa Romeo P2	7	Tyres	1
Ret	46	(Italy) Giuseppe Campari	2	Alfa Romeo P2	7	Tyres	3
DNS	66	(Italy) Luigi Premoli	4	Salmson		Forfeit start	

Grand Prix Race
1930 Grand Prix season
Previous race: 1929 Monza Grand Prix	Monza Grand Prix	Next race: 1931 Monza Grand Prix
