= Chapuis-Dornier =

French automobile engine manufacturer

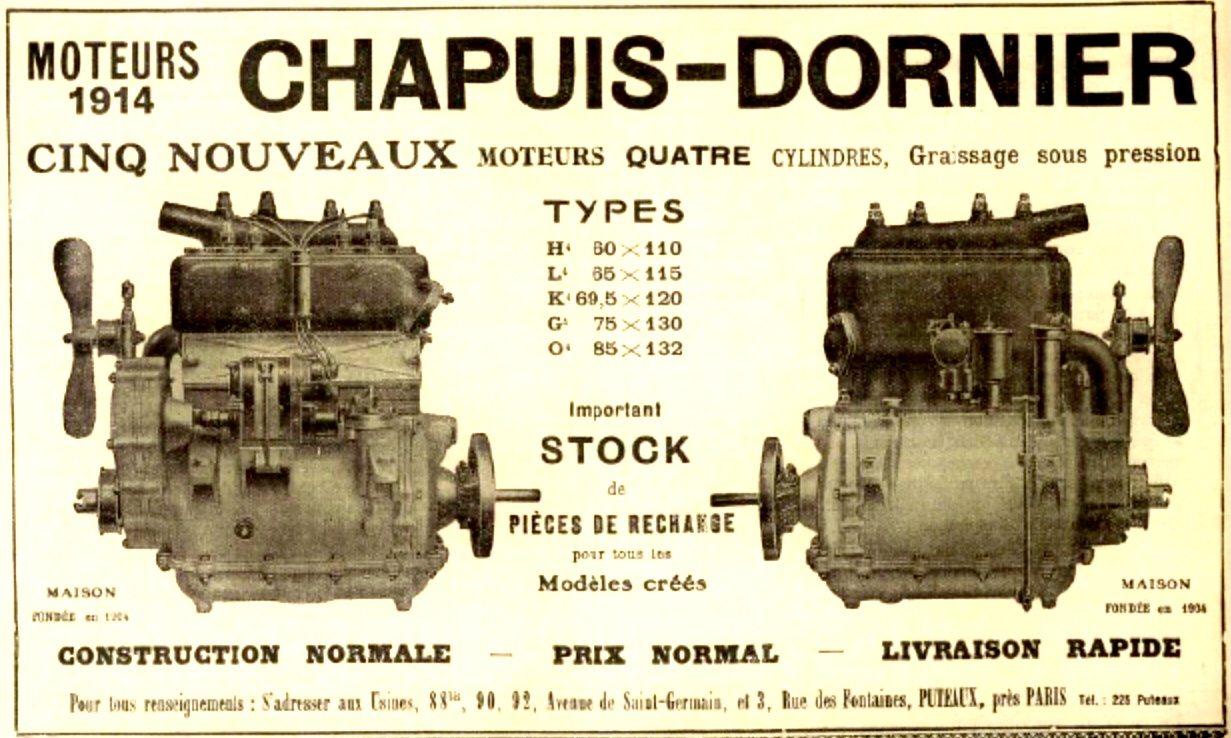
1914 advertisement for Chapuis-Dornier engines

Chapuis-Dornier was a French manufacturer of proprietary engines for automobiles from 1904 to 1928 in Puteaux near Paris. Between 1919 and 1921 it displayed a prototype automobile, but it was never volume produced.

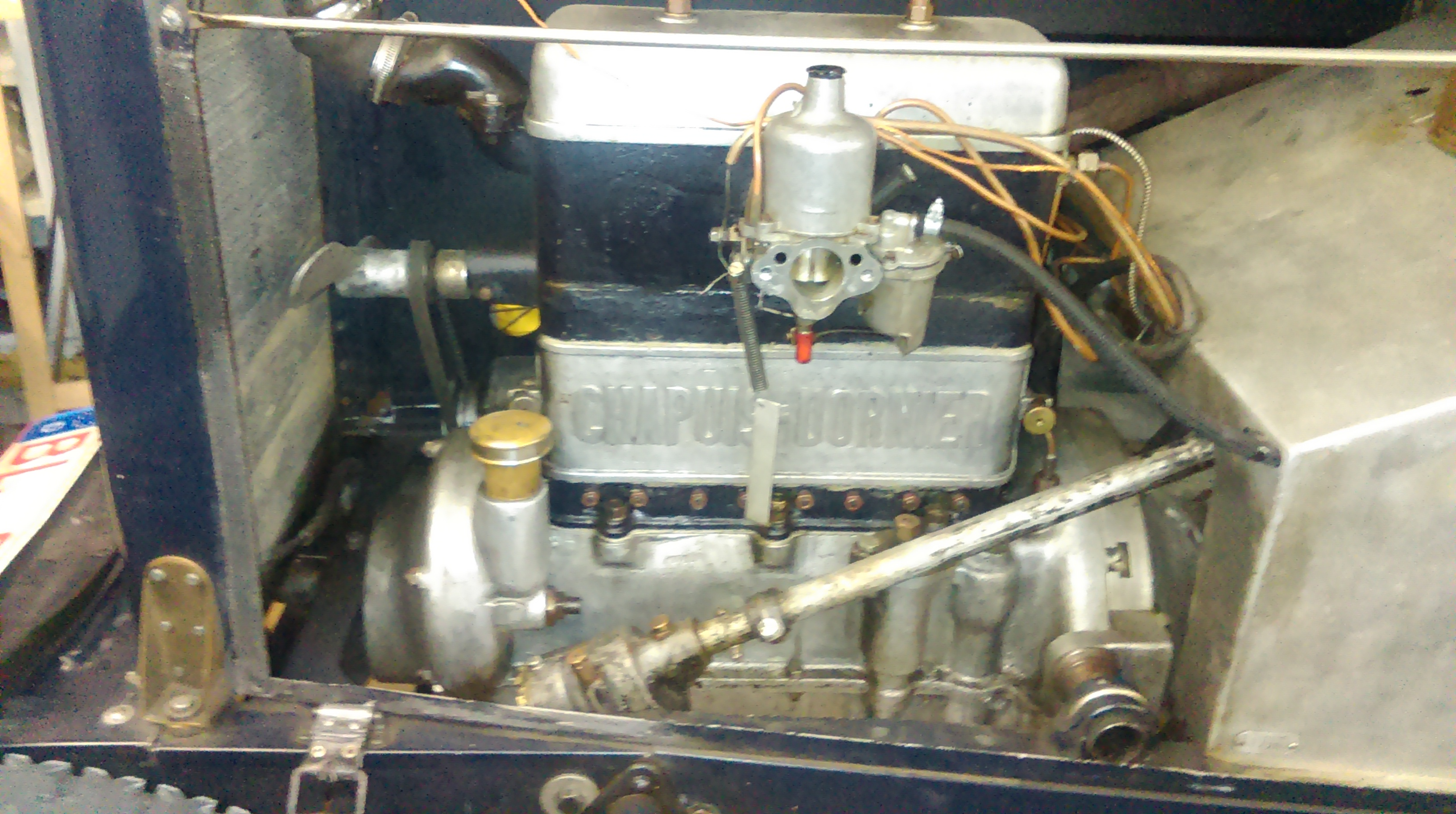
Chapuis-Dornier Motor engine

== Engine manufacture ==
Chapuis-Dornier engines were used by cyclecars such as:

- Able
- A.S. (Voiturettes Automobiles A.S)
- Autocrat
- Towarzystwo Budowy Samochodów AS
- Benjamin
- B.N.C. (Bollack Netter and Co)
- Costruzioni Automobili Riuniti
- Compagnie Générale des Voitures à Paris
- Corre La Licorne
- Delage
- Derby (French car)
- Doriot, Flandrin & Parant (D.F.P.)
- Dupressoir
- Fabbrica Automobili Officine Trubetzkoy
- Automobiles Favier
- J. Depreux
- Fox, (article)
- Verza Automobili G.A.R.
- Gardahaut
- Gobron-Brillié
- G.N.L. (Newey)
- Gordon Newey
- I.E.N.A. (Industria Economica Nazionale Automobili di Tommasi & Rizzi)
- Automobiles Induco
- Kevah (Kévah)
- La Gazelle
- Le Gui
- Le Roll
- E. Louvet
- Automobiles Madou
- Société A. Marguerite
- Marshall-Arter
- Officine Meccanica Giuseppe Meldi
- Automobiles M.S.
- Automobiles O. P.
- Patri
- Rabœuf
- Automobiles Rally
- Reyrol
- Sidéa (Société Industrielle des Automobiles Sidéa)
- Società Automobili e Motori (SAM)
- Sénéchal (automobile)
- S.P.A.G.
- Paul Speidel
- S.U.P.
- Société des Travaux Mécaniques et Automobiles (TAM)
- F. Dumoulin (Tic-Tac)
- Tuar (automobile) (Tuar)
- Cyclecars Vaillant
- SA des Voiturettes et Cyclecars (Zévaco)

== Automobile manufacture ==
Between 1919 and 1921 Chapuis-Dornier displayed a prototype automobile at the Paris salons, equipped with a 3-litre, four cylinder engine, but this never resulted in volume production.
