= Monza Grand Prix =

Former automobile race held in Monza, Italy

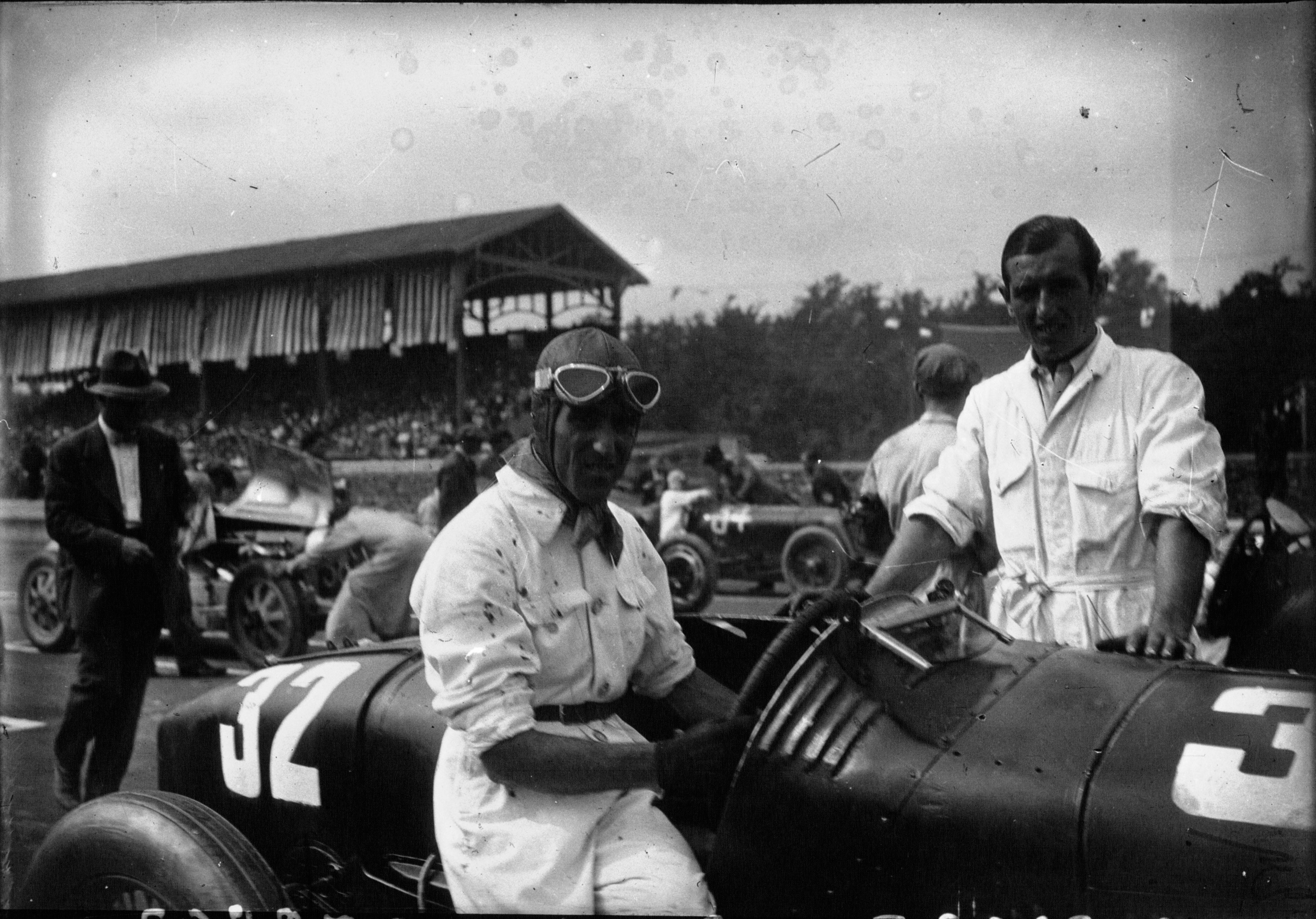
Tazio Nuvolari on the starting grid of 1930 Monza Grand Prix

The Monza Grand Prix (Italian: Gran Premio di Monza) was an automobile race held at the Autodromo Nazionale di Monza at Monza, Italy.

Following the terrible accident during the 1928 Italian Grand Prix, where Emilio Materassi and 27 spectators lost their lives, the Italian Grand Prix was cancelled in 1929 and 1930. Not wanting to abandon racing at the Monza track completely, the Monza Grand Prix was held as a substitute during these years. Even when the Italian Grand Prix returned to the racing calendar, the Monza Grand Prix was retained as a separate event.

The competition was typically divided into three short (~30 minutes) heats according to engine size, one repechage and a longer final.

The 1933 event was to be known as the Black Sunday, due to 3 top drivers (Giuseppe Campari, Baconin Borzacchini and Stanisław Czaykowski) getting killed in two separate accidents at the south banking of the high speed loop. The racing world was stunned and this spelled the end, not only for the Monza Grand Prix, but also for Monza's original 10 km circuit. The Italian Grand Prix continued on during the following years, using a number of different layouts, with chicanes put in to slow down the speed.

After the Second World War the Gran Premio dell'Autodromo di Monza was run in five editions between 1948 and 1952. The first of these was a Formula One race and the rest Formula Two. None of them counted towards the World Championship.

The race was resumed in 1980, when the Italian F1 Grand Prix was raced in "Dino Ferrari" circuit in Imola, a Formula Two race was arranged.

Today, the Italian Grand Prix is sometimes referred to as "the Monza Grand Prix" since it is so closely associated with the Monza track.

== Winners of the Monza Grand Prix ==
These are the winners of the Monza Grands Prix.

Year	Driver	Constructor	Class	Location	Report
1922	(France) André Dubonnet	Hispano-Suiza	Formula Libre	Monza	Report
1923 - 1928	Not held				
1929	(Italy) Achille Varzi	Alfa Romeo	Grand Prix	Monza	Report
1930	(Italy) Achille Varzi	Maserati	Grand Prix	Monza	Report
1931	(Italy) Luigi Fagioli	Maserati	Grand Prix	Monza	Report
1932	(Germany) Rudolf Caracciola	Alfa Romeo	Grand Prix	Monza	Report
1933	(France) Marcel Lehoux	Bugatti	Grand Prix	Monza	Report
1934 - 1947	Not held				
1948	(France) Jean-Pierre Wimille	Alfa Romeo	Formula One	Monza	Report
1949	(Argentina) Juan Manuel Fangio	Ferrari	Formula Two	Monza	Report
1950	(Italy) Luigi Villoresi	Ferrari	Formula Two	Monza	Report
1951	(Italy) Alberto Ascari	Ferrari	Formula Two	Monza	Report
1952	(Italy) Giuseppe Farina	Ferrari	Formula Two	Monza	Report
1953 - 1979	Not held				
1980	(United Kingdom) Derek Warwick	Toleman	Formula Two	Monza	Report

== See also ==
- Italian Grand Prix
