= AS-level =

AS-level may refer to:

- Advanced Subsidiary level (United Kingdom plus some other countries), public examination with a smaller course content than an A level
- Advanced Supplementary level, an old qualification which was part of the UK Advanced level system prior to 2000
- Hong Kong Advanced Supplementary Level Examination

== See also ==
- AS (disambiguation)
