= IENA (car) =

Former Italian automobile

The IENA was an Italian automobile manufactured by Industria Economica Nazionale Automobili di Tommasi et Rizzi in Lodi from 1921 until 1925. Two versions were made, a 750 cc light car or 1096 cc sports car, it used a French four-cylinder Chapuis-Dornier engine.

About 150 were made.
