= Doriot, Flandrin & Parant =

Doriot, Flandrin & Parant (D.F.P.) was a French car maker based in Courbevoie, Seine between 1906 and 1926.

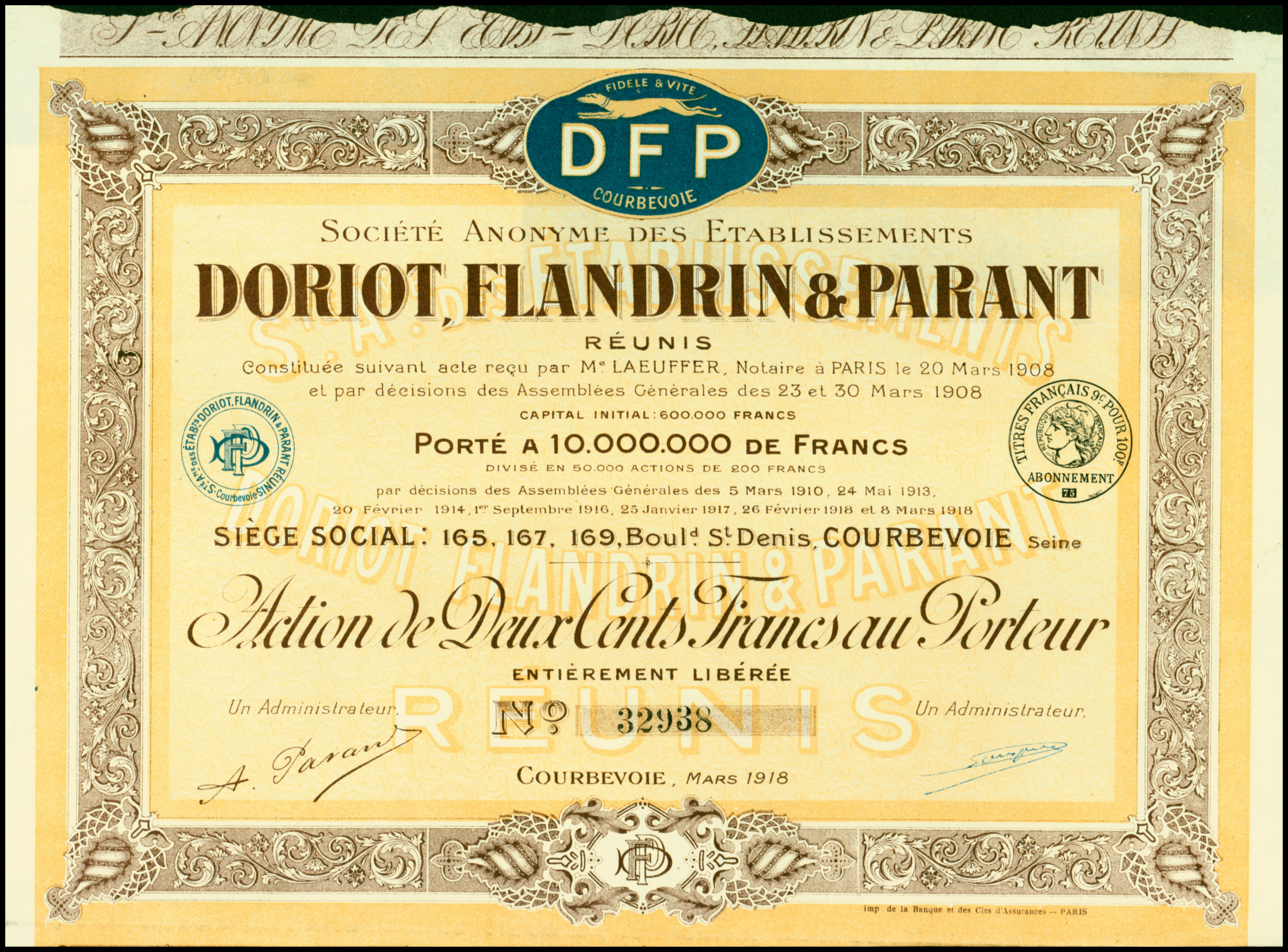
Share of the SA des Etablissements Doriot, Flandrin & Parant, issued March 1918

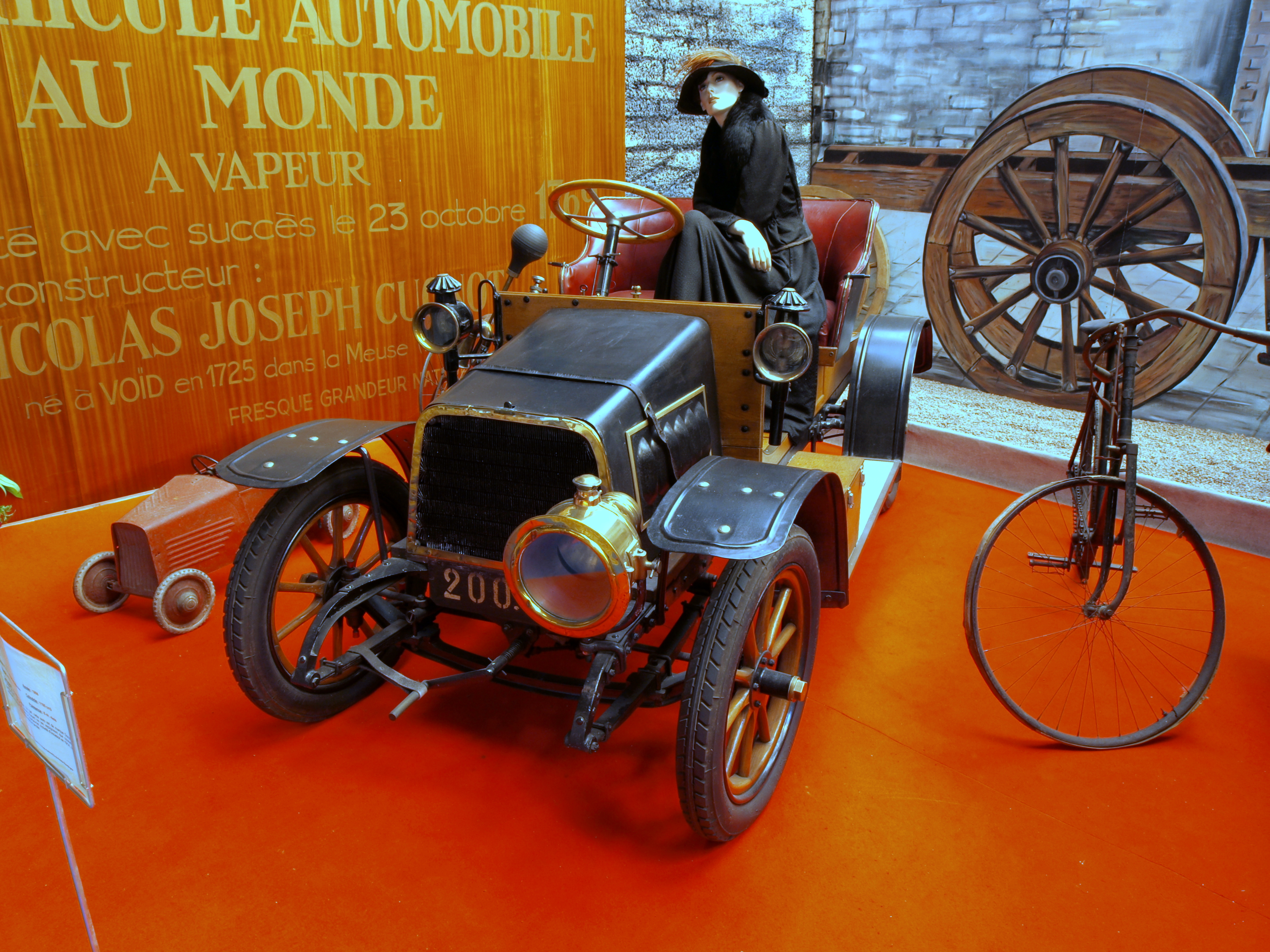
Doriot Flandrin et Cie

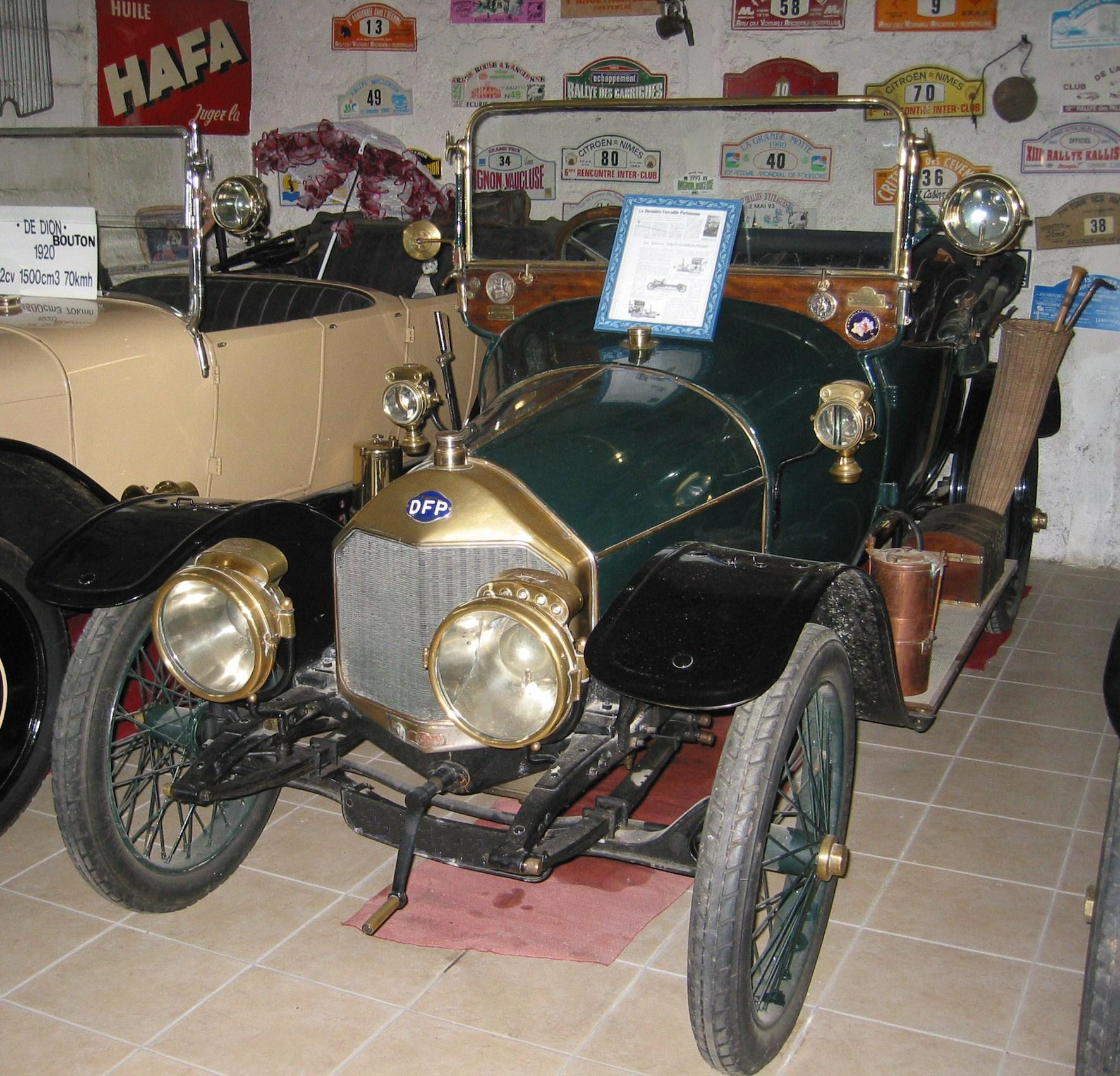
DFP 1908

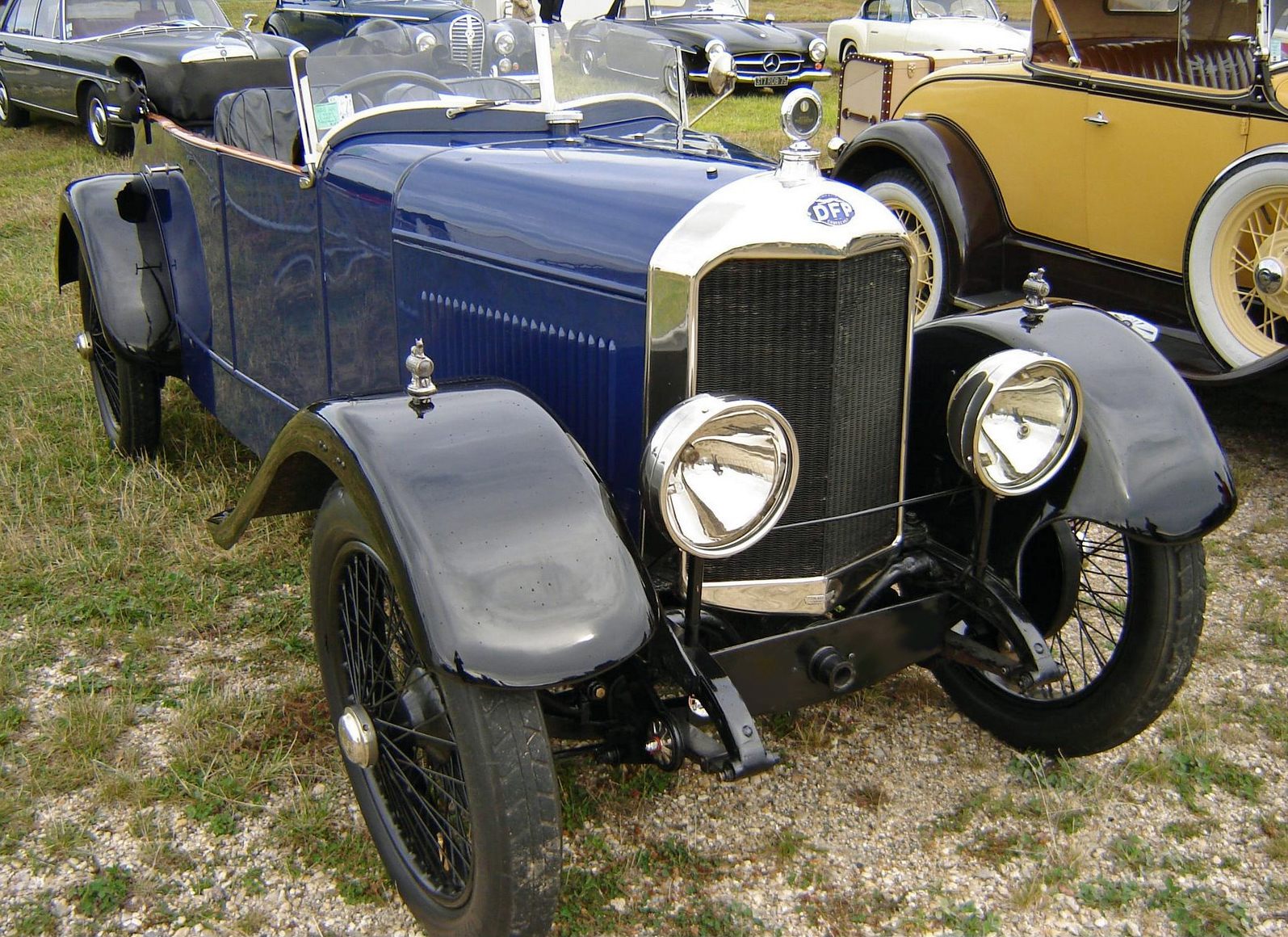
1924 D.F.P. ADM 2000 12CV

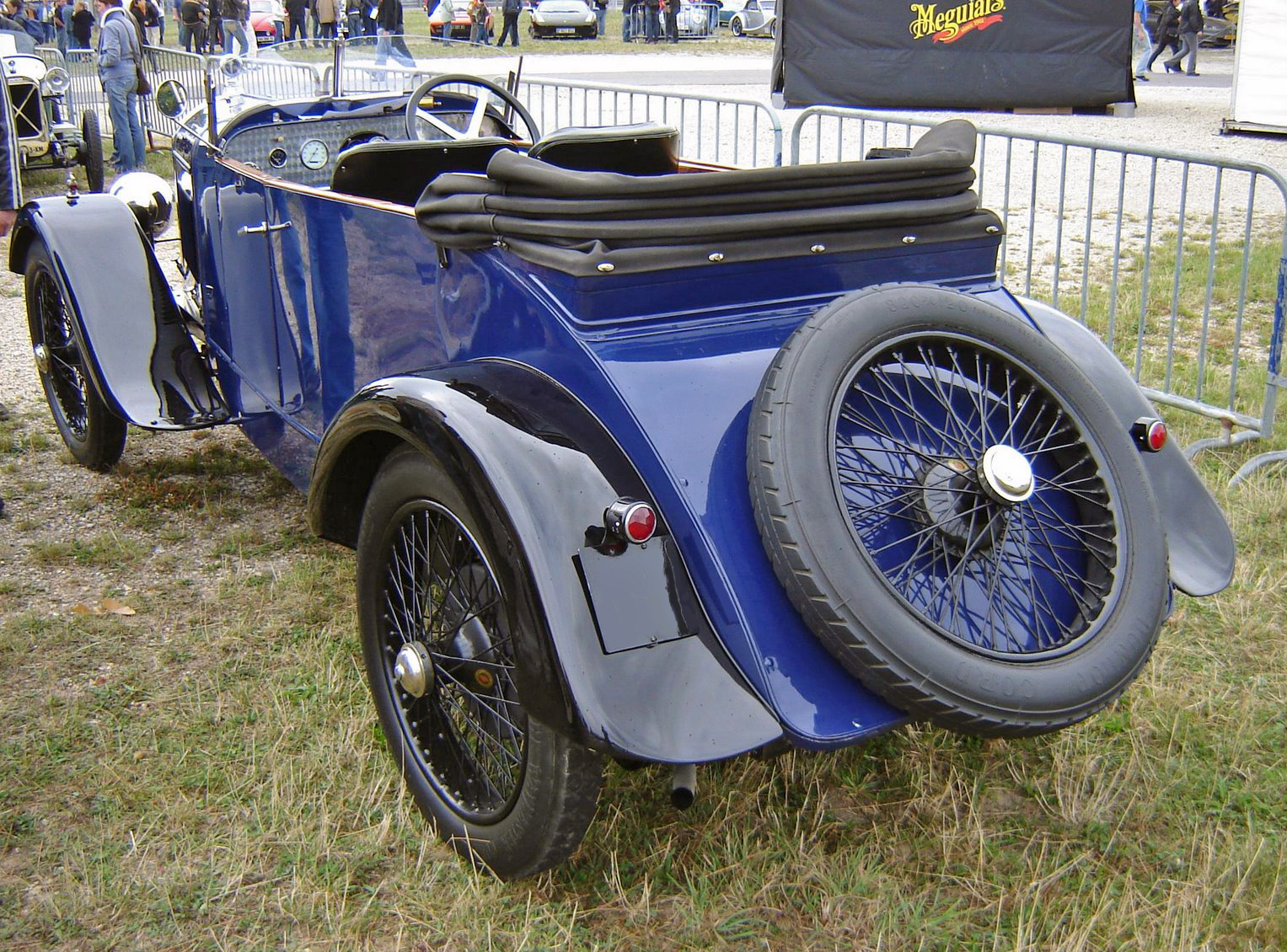
1924 DFP ADM2000 12CV

Auguste Doriot and Ludovic Flandrin had both worked for Peugeot and then Clément-Bayard before setting up their own car making company in 1906. Their main product was a single-cylinder voiturette which was sold as a Doriot-Flandrin.

In 1908 they were joined by Alexandre and Jules-René Parant and a new company was formed including all the names. Four-cylinder models were now made with Chapuis-Dornier engines alongside the single-cylinder cars. The singles were discontinued in 1910 and a smaller 1592 cc four joined the line up.

D.F.P. started to make their own engines in 1912. W. O. Bentley was the British distributor for the D.F.P. at the time. A tuned version of the company's 2-litre 12/15, fitted with aluminium pistons, was used by him to race at Brooklands - finishing sixth overall in the 1914 T.T., where cars of up to 3.3 litres were allowed to partake. The aluminium pistons were fitted to some 12/40 hp production cars from 1914. This car also had electric starting.

After World War I D.F.P. started to fit their cars with proprietary engines mainly from both Altos and Sargant.

In 1923 they started to make their own engines again fitting them to the 1924 cc 13/50 model. A new light car was also introduced as the D.F. Petite with 1098 cc made by C.I.M.E..

All production finished in 1926 and the factory was sold to light car maker Lafitte but they in turn closed in 1928.

== Car Models ==
- 1906-10 : Type 6cv ("Chapuis-Dornier" single-cylinder 1.1-litre)
- 1906-10 : Type 8cv ("Chapuis-Dornier" single-cylinder 1.1-litre)
- 1907-10 : Type 10cv ("Chapuis-Dornier" 4-cylinder 2.0-litre)
- 1908-12 : Type 12cv ("Chapuis-Dornier" 4-cylinder 2.4-litre)
- 1908-12 : Type 14cv ("Chapuis-Dornier" 4-cylinder 2.8-litre)
- 1911-14 : Type "10/12" ("Chapuis-Dornier" 4-cylinder 1.6-litre)
- 1911-14 : Type "25/30" ("Chapuis-Dornier" 6-cylinder)
- 1912-14 : Type "12/15" ("D.F.P" 4-cylinder 2.0-litre)
- 1912-14 : Type "12/16" ("D.F.P" 4-cylinder 2.8-litre)
- 1913-14 : Type "16/22" ("D.F.P" 4-cylinder 3.0-litre)
- 1914 : Type "12/40" Sport ("D.F.P" 6-cylinder 3.3-litre)
- 1919-22 : series 2000 Type 7cv ("Alto" 4-cylinder 1.1-litre)
- 1919-22 : series 2000 Type 10cv ("Sargant" 4-cylinder 1.6-litre)
- 1919-22 : series 2000 Type 12cv ("Alto" 4-cylinder 2.0-litre)
- 1922-26 : series A.D.M Type "10/12" ("American" 4-cylinder 1.6-litre)
- 1923-26 : series A.D.M Type "13/50" ("D.F.P" 4-cylinder 2.0-litre)
- 1924-33 : series V/VA Type 7cv DF ("D.F.P" 4-cylinder 1.1-litre)
