= Induco =

The Induco was a French automobile manufactured in Puteaux from 1922 to 1924. Built by a M. Van der Heyden, it was a light car with a 1094 cc Chapuis-Dornier engine.
