= Autocrat (car) =

Autocrat Light Car Co
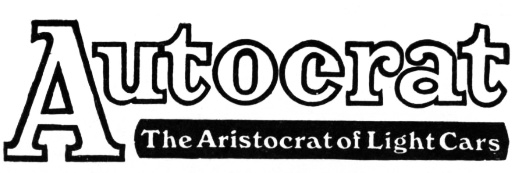
- Type: Private
- Industry: Automotive
- Founded: 1913; 113 years ago
- Defunct: 1926; 100 years ago
- Headquarters: Birmingham, England
- Key people: Ivy Rogers, Miss Howell
- Products: Automobile

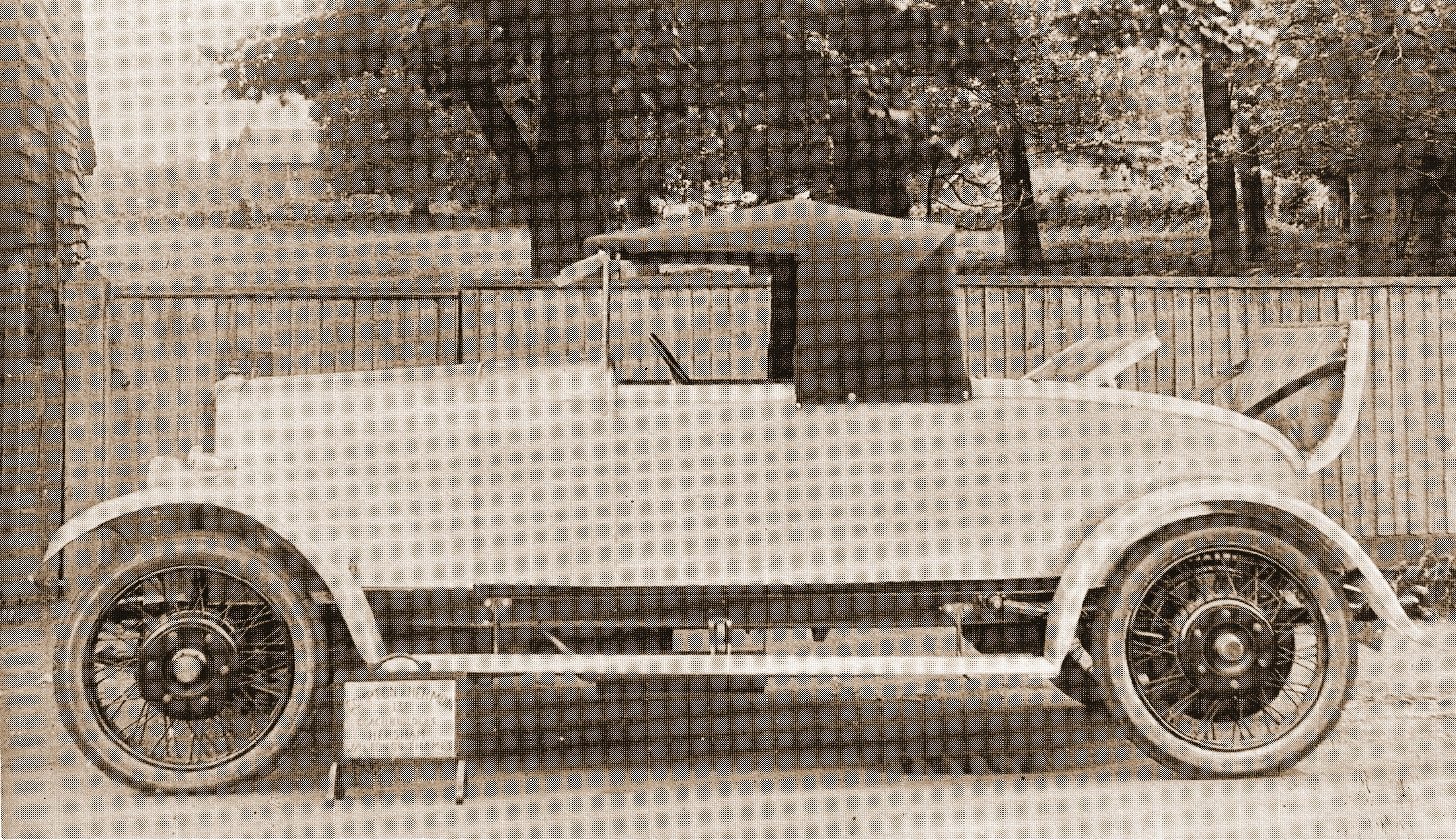
1924 Autocrat 10/12

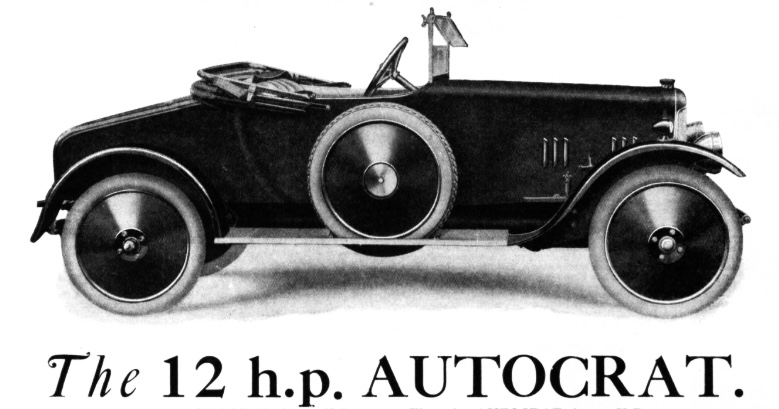
Autocrat 12 hp (1920-1926)

The Autocrat was a British car manufacturer operating from 1913 to 1926. The company operated from premises in the Balsall Heath area of Birmingham. Unusually for the time the company seems to have been run by two women, Ivy Rogers and Miss Howell.

The first cars in 1913 were cyclecars powered at first by Peugeot and later by JAP air cooled V-twin engines. The Peugeot engine was mounted with its cylinders in a "fore and aft" layout and drove the rear axle via a chain but the JAP version had the engine mounted across the chassis with a chain drive to a separate gearbox and shaft to the back axle. In spite of being air cooled both cars had a dummy radiator.

The cyclecar was quickly joined by a light car with a 1098 cc four cylinder Chapuis-Dornier engine and shaft drive to a three speed gearbox. Production of the V-twins stopped in 1914.Some car production seems to have continued into World War I and in 1915 a 1340 cc Coventry Simplex engined car was listed.

In 1919 a new range of 10-12 hp cars was introduced with engines from a variety of makers including Meadows, Coventry Simplex and Dorman. Capacities varied from 1500cc to 2000cc. Drive was to the rear axle via a three of four speed gearbox and torque tube. The suspension used semi elliptic leaf springs all round. Autocrat built their own coachwork to a very high standard, but the price was high at £875 in 1920. Electric starting was introduced in 1923 and a closed body was offered alongside the open cars. A detachable hard top was also available for some models and a sports version with the chassis lowered by 3.5 inches was listed.

The company was taken over by Calthorpe in 1926 and the factory was closed.
