= Carlo Pedrazzini =

Swiss racing driver (1909–34)

- Born: Jean Pedrazzini; 2 September 1909 Ticino, Switzerland
- Died: 22 April 1934 (aged 24) Alessandria, Italy

Carlo Pedrazzini was a Swiss Grand Prix racing driver, who was killed in a racing accident in 1934.

== Career ==
Although christened Jean, Pedrazzini - born to a Locarno-based family, in an Italian-speaking canton - was generally known as Carlo. He dovetailed his racing career with studying architecture at the University of Zürich and often competed against his brother Giovanni.

Pedrazzini took part in the 1930 Monza Grand Prix driving a 1.5 litre capacity Maserati 26B in the smallest class category; he finished 4th in the heat, despite giving away half-a-litre of capacity to most of the field, and set fastest lap. This put him into the final, in which he ran 7th (harrying Rudolf Caracciola) when a wheel gave way and he was forced to retire.

He made one Grand Prix appearance, at the 1931 Monaco Grand Prix, with the Maserati bored out to 2 litres. Alfieri Maserati, giving the car a pre-race check, managed to crash it and ruin its front axle, and Pedrazzini was only able to start after Tim Birkin - who had struggled in qualifying - handed his front axle over. It was to no avail, as Pedrazzini, struck with an overnight bug, had to withdraw early on.

== Death ==
Pedrazzini was killed at the 1934 Circuito di Alessandria. Driving a Scuderia Siena Maserati 8CM (chassis number 3014), Pedrazzini was caught out on a wet track, and hit a bridge parapet; the Maserati somersaulted into a wall and Pedrazzini, thrown out of the rolling car, died of injuries in the evening. Tazio Nuvolari later crashed at the same place but, in striking a tree, escaped with a broken leg. A monument to Pedrazzini was put up at the accident site and later moved to the Automobile Club d'Italia building in Alessandria.
