= AS S1 and AS S2 =

Passenger car manufactured by Stoewer between 1927 and 1930

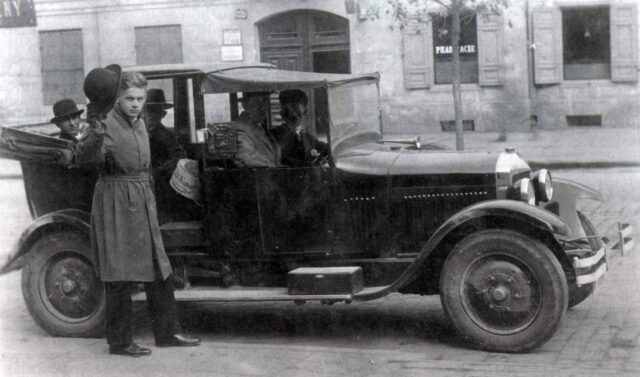
- AS S1 or AS S2 car in the taxi landaulet version.

Overview
- Manufacturer: Towarzystwo Budowy Samochodów AS
- Production: 1927–1930
- Assembly: Warsaw, Poland
- Designer: Aleksander Liberman (chassis)

Body and chassis
- Class: Passenger car, van
- Body style: Landaulet, convertible, limousine and panel van

Powertrain
- Engine: straight-four flathead Chapuis-Dornier (S1) straight-four overhead valve CIME (S2)

AS S1 and AS S2 were two twin models of passenger car manufactured by Towarzystwo Budowy Samochodów AS in Warsaw, Poland from 1927 to 1930. The two models differed with their engines and existed in four versions of car body style: taxi landaulet, convertible, limousine and panel van. Around 150 cars have been manufactured. There are no known surviving units, with one of the last known being last recorded in the late 1950s.

== History ==
The car was designed and assembled by Towarzystwo Budowy Samochodów AS (lit. 'AS Car Manufacturing Company') in Warsaw, Poland, in the workshops Warszawskie Autowarsztaty (lit. 'Warsaw Car Workshops') at 64 Złota Street. Its chassis was designed by Aleksander Liberman, with first prototypes being made on 4 January 1927. On 27 March 1927, the final version was manufactured in the factory Fabryka Powozów Braci Węgrzeckich (lit. 'Węgrzecki Brothers Carriage Factory'), located in Szydłowiec, Poland.

Following a few months of the road tests, the car was approved to be sold. It was manufactured in four car body styles: taxi landaulet, convertible, limousine and panel van. The taxi landaulet version was the most popular, with around 100 cars being made, while the other version had around 50 cars in total. The chassis itself was also aviable to be ordered for al lower price.

The car was manufactured in two versions, with different engines: S1 and S2. S1 used engine manufactured by Chapuis-Dornier while S2, by CIME. The first models of the car also used the engine made by Ruby. All engines, as well as the gearbox were imported from France. The rest of the elements of the car were manufactured in Poland.

The manufacturing company was awarded the silver medal for its cars at the 1929 Polish General Exhibition in Poznań. Its cars also arouse interest at the event. The vehicles were praised for theirs noiseless, non-resistive, and precise way of closing its doors. The company ceased their porduction in 1930, due to the financial difficulties during the Great Depression.

Around 150 AS cars were manufactured. They were made in three series, the first two counting 60 and 80 cars, respectively. The third series was planned to count 100 cars, however, only a small number was manufactured.

There are no known units surviving. One of the cars was used in the barricade at the Wilcza Street, during the Warsaw Uprising in 1944. Another unit, probably the last to survive the Second World War, was used as a taxi in Warsaw, until the first half of the 1950s.

== Specifications ==
The car was available in two versions with different engines: S1 and S2. AS S1 had straight-four flathead Chapuis-Dornier engine with 17 kW power and a capacity of 990 cm^{3}. AS S2 had a straight-four overhead valve CIME engine with 24 kW power and a capacity of 1203 cm^{3} 24 KW power. The car was manufactured in four car body styles: taxi landaulet, convertible, limousine and panel van.

== Gallery ==
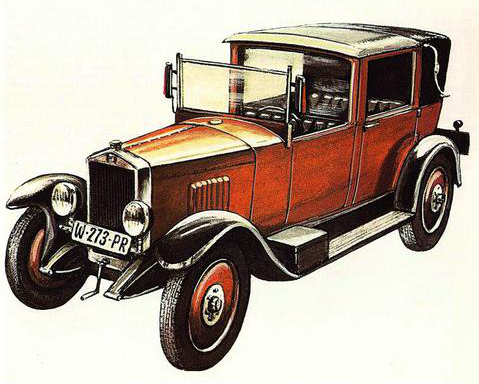
The illustration of the taxi landaulet version.

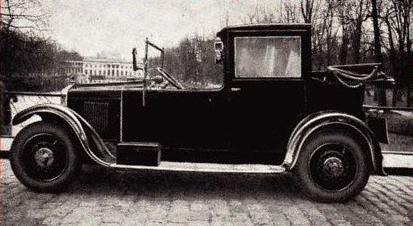
The taxi landaulet version.

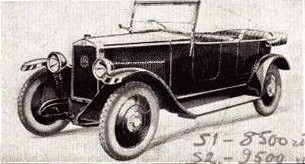
The illustration of the convertible version.

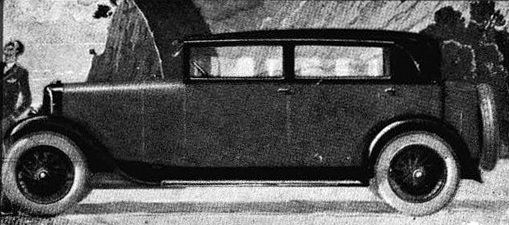
The illustration of the limousine version.

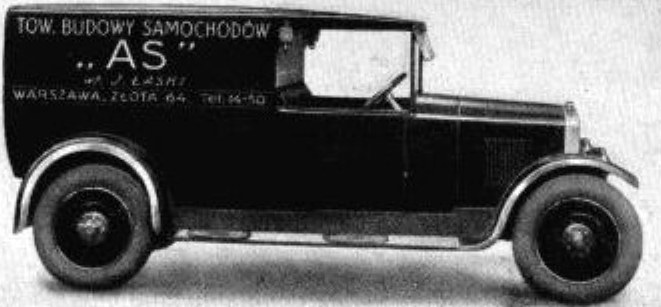
The panel van version.
