= Kevah =

Discontinued French automobile

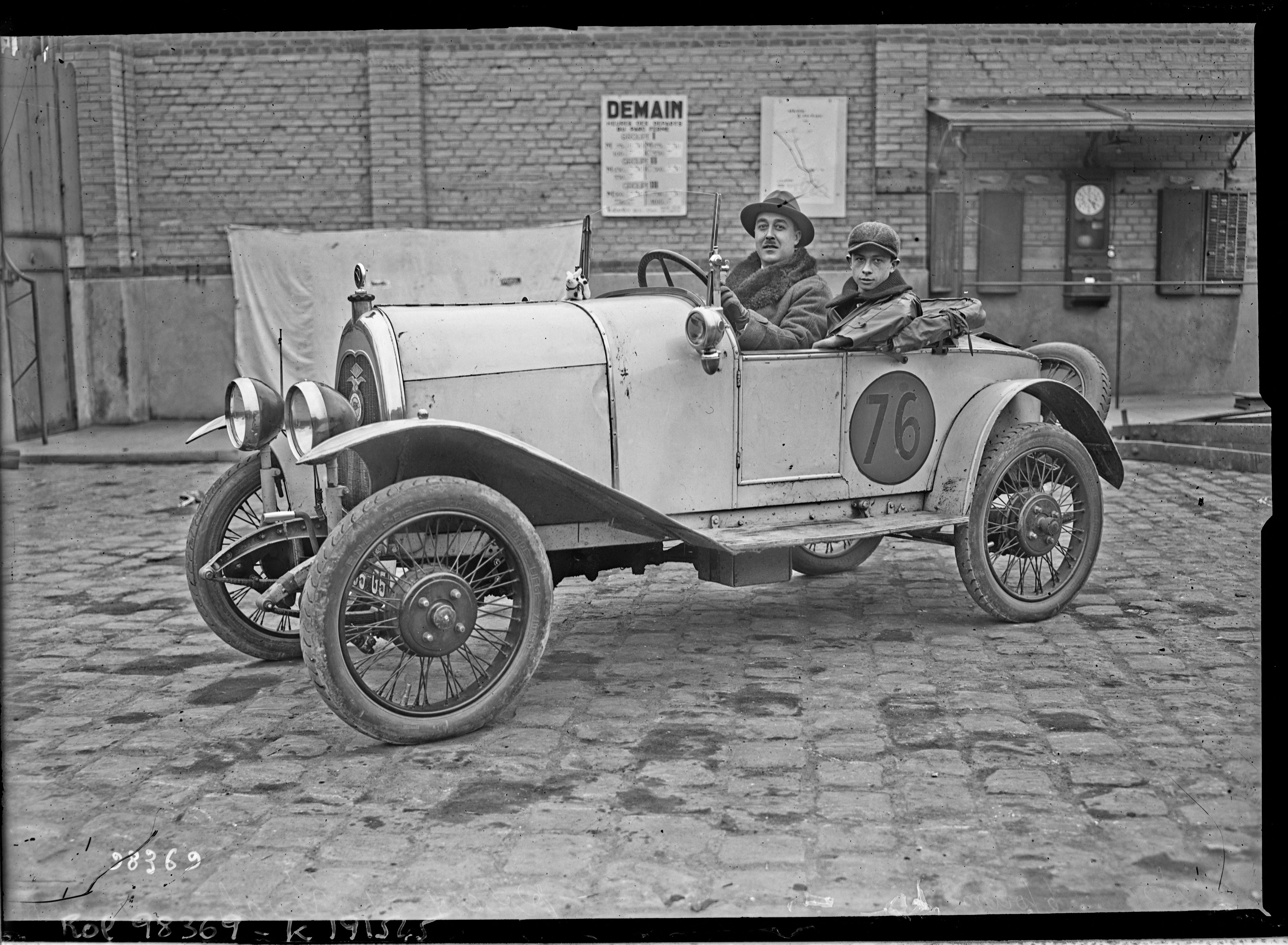
Robert in a Kevah on 2 February 1925, almost 100 years ago.

The Kevah was a French automobile manufactured from 1920 until 1924. Built by Muller, Allen-Sommer and Robert at La Garenne-Colombes, the cyclecar had vee-twin 1100 cc Train or MAG engines, and was considered well-made. The company offered a four-cylinder 898 cc sv Chapuis-Dornier-powered car with three-speed gearbox in 1923.
