= Lafitte (automobile) =

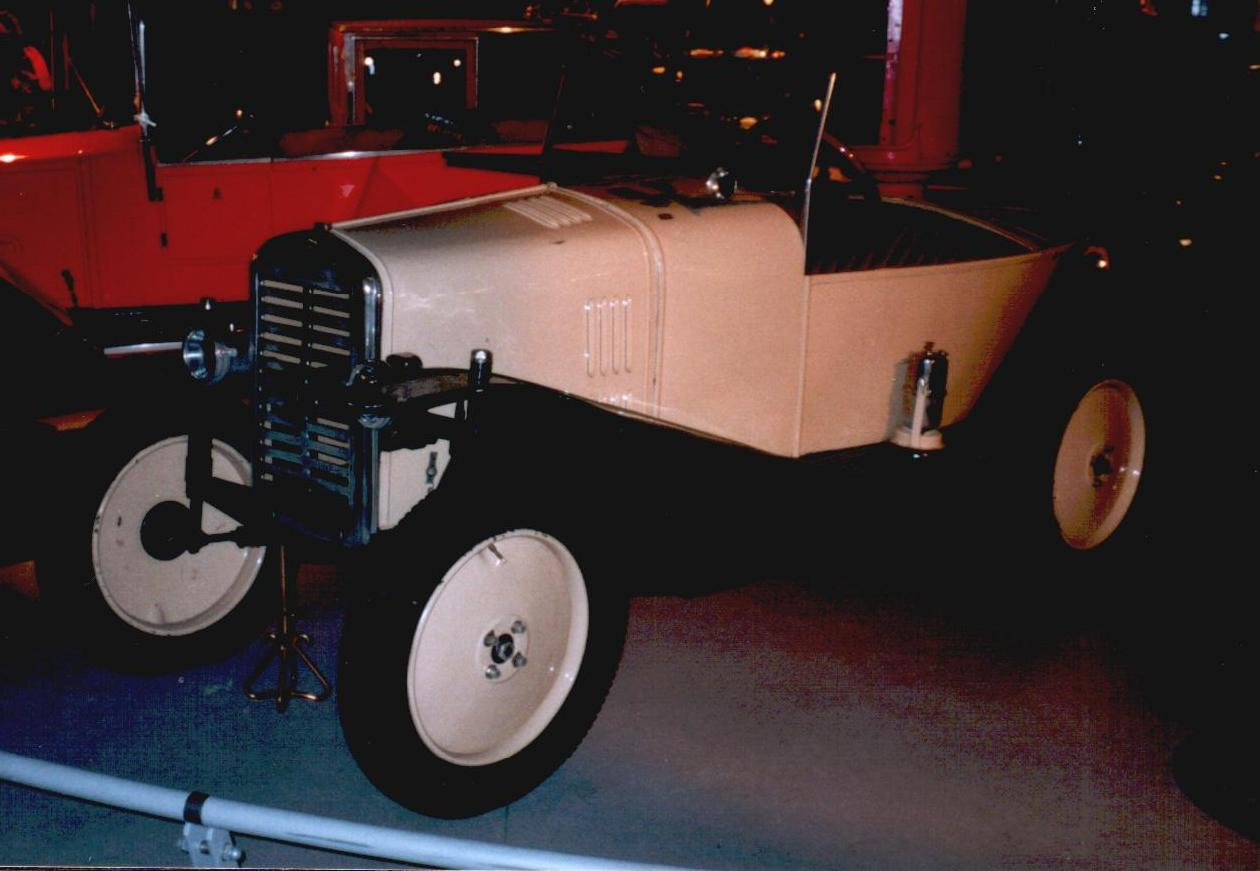
Lafitte

Lafitte was a French automobile manufactured in Paris from 1923–1928. The 'SA de Construction de Voiturettes Th. Lafitte', owned by Theodore Laffitte, manufactured a light cyclecar which was renowned for its innovative engineering. It incorporated a three-cylinder radial engine mounted in a hinged cage, which was tilted by the driver to engage and vary the ratio of the friction drive to the rear wheels. Uniquely, the 'variable ratio' friction drive consisted of a convex steel flywheel and a concave 'clutch plate' that was faced by wound strips of paper or sometimes leather.

== History ==
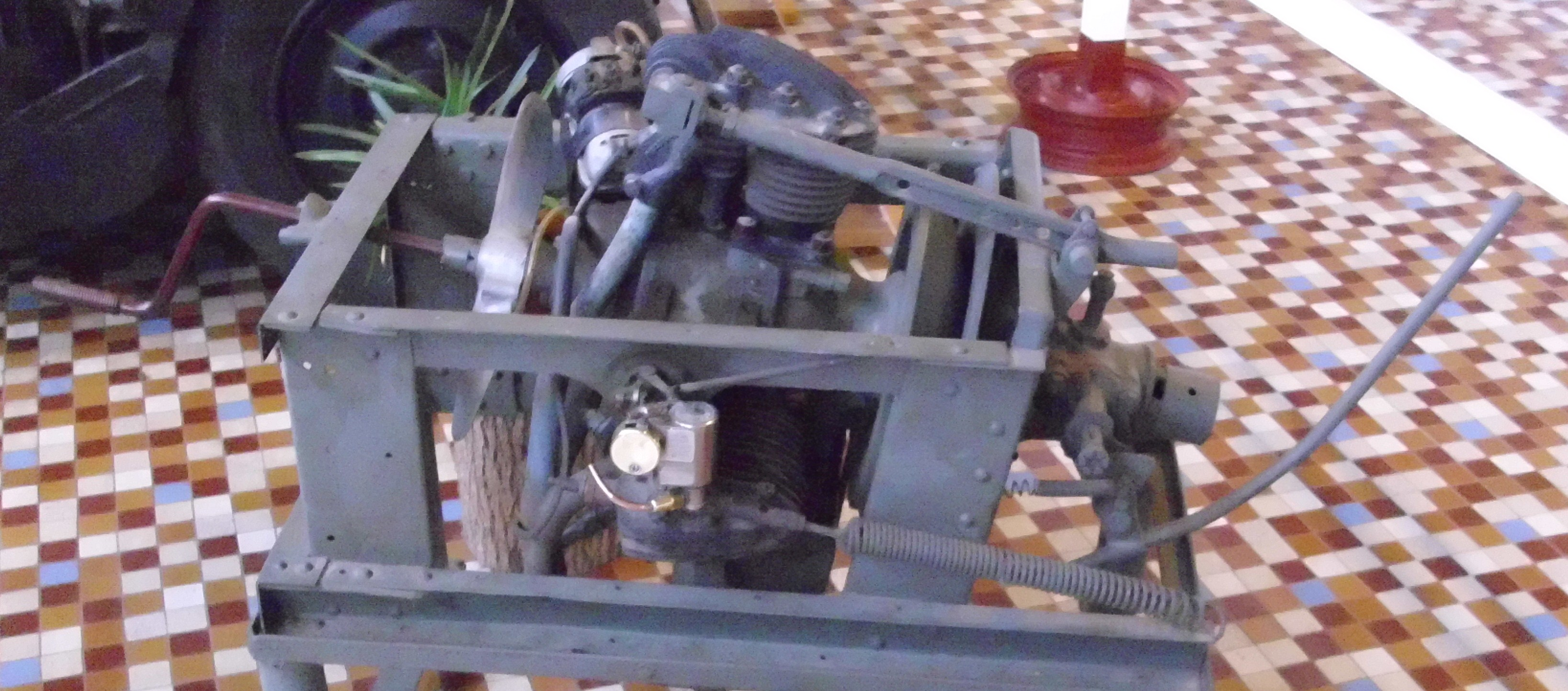
3 cylinder radial engine (mounted in a display cage similar to the original car) that was hinged to the chassis and tilted by the driver using the long lever seen on the right. The large convex flywheel and concave clutch surface can be seen within the display stand. The possibility of inventing variable speed transmission was avoided by using fixed notch positions for the 'tilt lever'.

Lafitte began constructing automobiles in Paris in 1923 on The Quai. In 1926 they started using the manufacturing facility in Courbevoie, of the defunct Doriot, Flandrin & Parant. In 1928 it ceased production.

== Models ==
The Lafitte was an unconventional car. It was powered by 22 hp 3 cylinder radial engine of 736cc capacity, which was enlarged to 895cc in 1928, its final year. The engine was mounted in a hinged cage, which was tilted by the driver to engage and vary the ratio of the friction drive to the rear wheels. Uniquely, the 'variable ratio' friction drive consisted of a convex steel flywheel and a concave 'clutch plate' that was faced by wound strips of paper or sometimes leather. The new price in England was 100 pounds sterling.

In 1928, a sports version with a 25 hp, 895cc engine topped the range. The maximum speed was quoted as 96 kilometres per hour (60 mph).

== Review ==
It was described by Bill Boddy, editor of Motor Sport as :

"The kind of thing that only an inebriated person staggering along the Strand clutching £100 in his hand, would have bought new.

== Literature ==
- Harald H. Linz, Halwart Schrader : The International Automobile Encyclopedia . United Soft Media Verlag, Munich 2008, ISBN 978-3-8032-9876-8 .
- George Nick Georgano (Chefredakteur): The Beaulieu Encyclopedia of the Automobile. Volume 2: G–O. Fitzroy Dearborn Publishers, Chicago 2001, ISBN 1-57958-293-1. (english)
- George Nick Georgano: Autos. Encyclopédie complète. 1885 à nos jours. Courtille, Paris 1975. (french)
