= Able (1920 automobile) =

1920s French automobile

Overview
- Also called: Toulouse
- Production: 1920–1925
- Designer: Paul Toulouse

Body and chassis
- Class: Cyclecar

Powertrain
- Engine: 1,100 cc (67 cu in)–1,500 cc (92 cu in)

The Able was a small French cyclecar made in Avignon,108 Rue Philomarde by Paul Toulouse, built between 1920 and 1927.

It was a fairly ordinary 4-cylinder light car that utilized engines from companies such as SCAP, Chapuis-Dornier and CIME, ranging from 1100 cc to 1500 cc. Some cars were sold under the name "Toulouse". The Able was one of many regional makes in France in the 1920s that was unable to compete with mass manufacturers such as Citroen, Peugeot and Renault.
