= Tuar (automobile) =

Short-lived French automobile

Tuar (Garage Moderne)
- Industry: Automobile repairs (1913–1956); Automobile production (1913–1925)
- Founded: 1913
- Defunct: 1925 (end of auto-production)
- Headquarters: Thouars, France
- Key people: Adrien Morin (1880–1968)
- Products: Automobiles
- Number of employees: 35 (1920s)

The Tuar was a short-lived French automobile.

== Adrien Morin ==
Adrien Morin was born at Brion-près-Thouet on 8 May 1880. the son of a successful local lawyer. Initially Morin followed his father into the law, but he was seduced into a career switch by the lure of the new and rapidly expanding automobile industry then growing up around the Paris hub. He gained experience in the automobile sector, working successively for Vinot & Deguingand, Decauville and Cornilleau & Sainte-Beuve. In 1913 he returned to western France and established the Garage Moderne, an automobile repair business, at Thouars, some 7 kilometers (4 miles) from the village where he had been born. He also started producing light cars, using bought-in components, and powered by Chapuis-Dornier engines. The cars carried the Tuar name, this being a phonetic spelling of the name of the small town where they were assembled. The first of them was a "Torpedo" bodied car with an 8HP 1,726cc engine: it was registered on 15 January 1914 and sold by Morin to a local lawyer, who would have been one of his father's business rivals.

== The business ==
Morin's automobile manufacturing business grew following the war to a point where in 1922 he was employing more than 50 people. However, located in a small country town the manufacturer was isolated from the synergistic networks of expertise and suppliers available to automakers in the Paris hub, and Morin found himself out-competed. Production ended in 1925 by which time about 800 cars had been produced. The Garage Moderne nevertheless continued in existence till 1956.

== The war and beyond ==
During the war the factory was requisitioned for munitions production.

Less than a year after peace broke out Tuar took at stand at the 15th Paris Motor Show in October 1919 and promoted a 10HP car designated as the "Tuar Type B2". The 10HP Tuar used a 1,790 cc 4-cylinder engine of unspecified provenance.

The list of engines fitted in Tuar cars during the next few years is a long one. It included 4-cylinder engines of 1244cc, 1327cc 1495cc, 1503cc, 160acc, 1821cc. Although the company's leading engine supplier was Chapuis-Dornier they were also fitting 4-cylinder units from CIME, Fivet and Ruby. A 6-cylinder 1496cc engine from CIME also featured.

== Reading list ==
- Harald Linz, Halwart Schrader: Die Internationale Automobil-Enzyklopädie. United Soft Media Verlag, München 2008, ISBN 978-3-8032-9876-8. (German)
- George Nick Georgano (Chefredakteur): The Beaulieu Encyclopedia of the Automobile. Volume 3: P–Z. Fitzroy Dearborn Publishers, Chicago 2001, ISBN 1-57958-293-1. (English)
- George Nick Georgano: Autos. Encyclopédie complète. 1885 à nos jours. Courtille, Paris 1975. (French)
