= As-e Jadid =

As-e Jadid اس جديد
- Village
- Location within Iran
- Coordinates: 38°41′00″N 47°08′00″E
- Country: Iran
- Province: East Azerbaijan
- County: Kaleybar
- Bakhsh: Central
- Rural District: Peyghan Chayi

Population (2006)
  - Total: 29
- Time zone: UTC+3:30 (IRST)
  - Summer (DST): UTC+4:30 (IRDT)

As-e Jadid (Persian: اس جديد, also Romanized as Ās-e Jadīd) is a village in Peyghan Chayi Rural District, in the Central District of Kaleybar County, East Azerbaijan Province, Iran. At the 2006 census, its population was 29, in 8 families.
