= Voiturettes Automobiles A.S. =

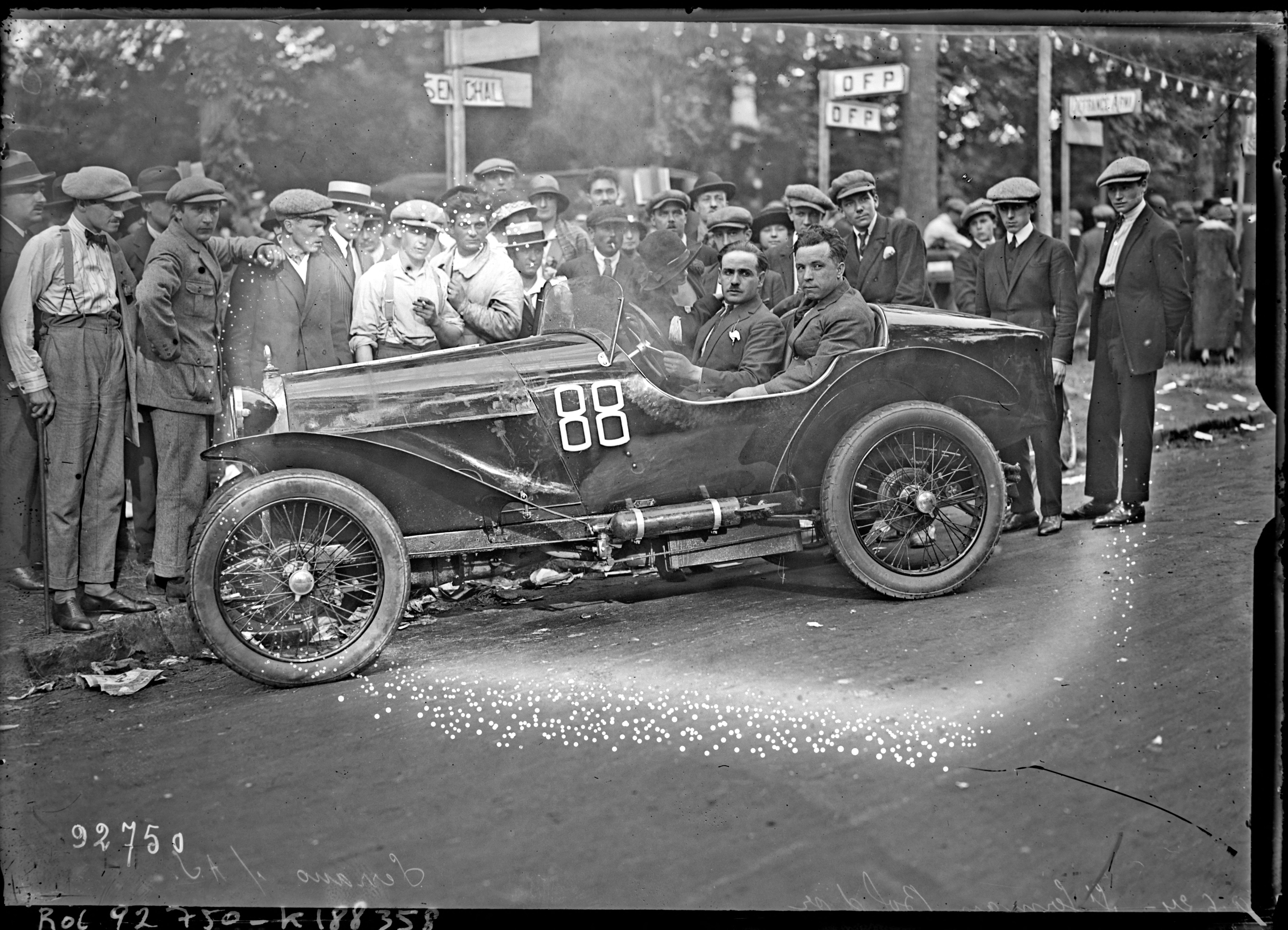
The AS Type A2 car in 1924.

Voiturettes Automobiles A.S. was a sports automobile manufacturer company based in Courbevoie, and later in La Garenne-Colombes, in France. It was established in 1919 by Lucien Jeannin, and existed until 1928.

== History ==
The company was established in 1919 by Lucien Jeannin, in Courbevoie, France. It began the automobil production in 1924, with its AS Type A2 and AS Type A2S sports cars. In 1926, moved its headquarters to La Garenne-Colombes. It ceased to exist in 1928.

== Vehicle models ==
- AS Type A2
- AS Type A2S

== Bibliography ==
- Harald H. Linz, Halwart Schrader: Die Internationale Automobil-Enzyklopädie. United Soft Media Verlag, München 2008, ISBN 978-3-8032-9876-8. (in German)
- George Nick Georgano: The Beaulieu Encyclopedia of the Automobile, vol. 1, A–F. Fitzroy Dearborn Publishers, Chicago 2001, ISBN 1-57958-293-1.
- George Nick Georgano: Autos. Encyclopédie complète. 1885 à nos jours. Courtille, Paris 1975. (in French)
