= Automobiles Rally =

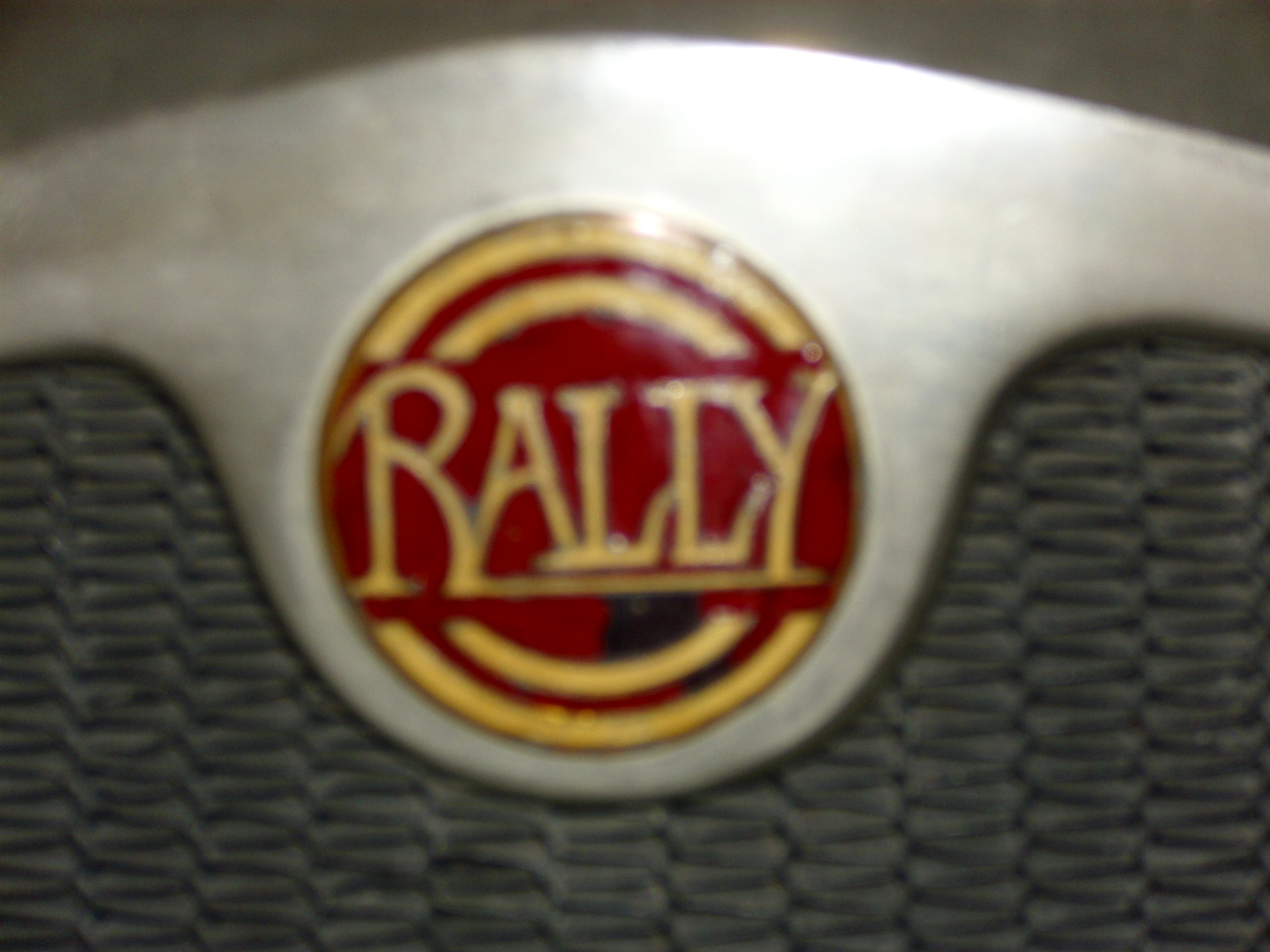
- One of several logos used by Rally
- Industry: Manufacturing
- Founded: 1921
- Founder: Eugène Affovard Asnière
- Defunct: 1933 or 1934
- Headquarters: Colombes, Paris, France
- Products: Automobiles

Automobiles Rally was a small company which made sporting automobiles in Colombes, a northwestern suburb of Paris. The company traded from 1921 until 1933, but they did not manage to survive the Great Depression. Known for sporting and handsomely designed cars, Rally competed with other French cyclecar makers of the era such as Amilcar, B.N.C., and Salmson.

== History and products ==
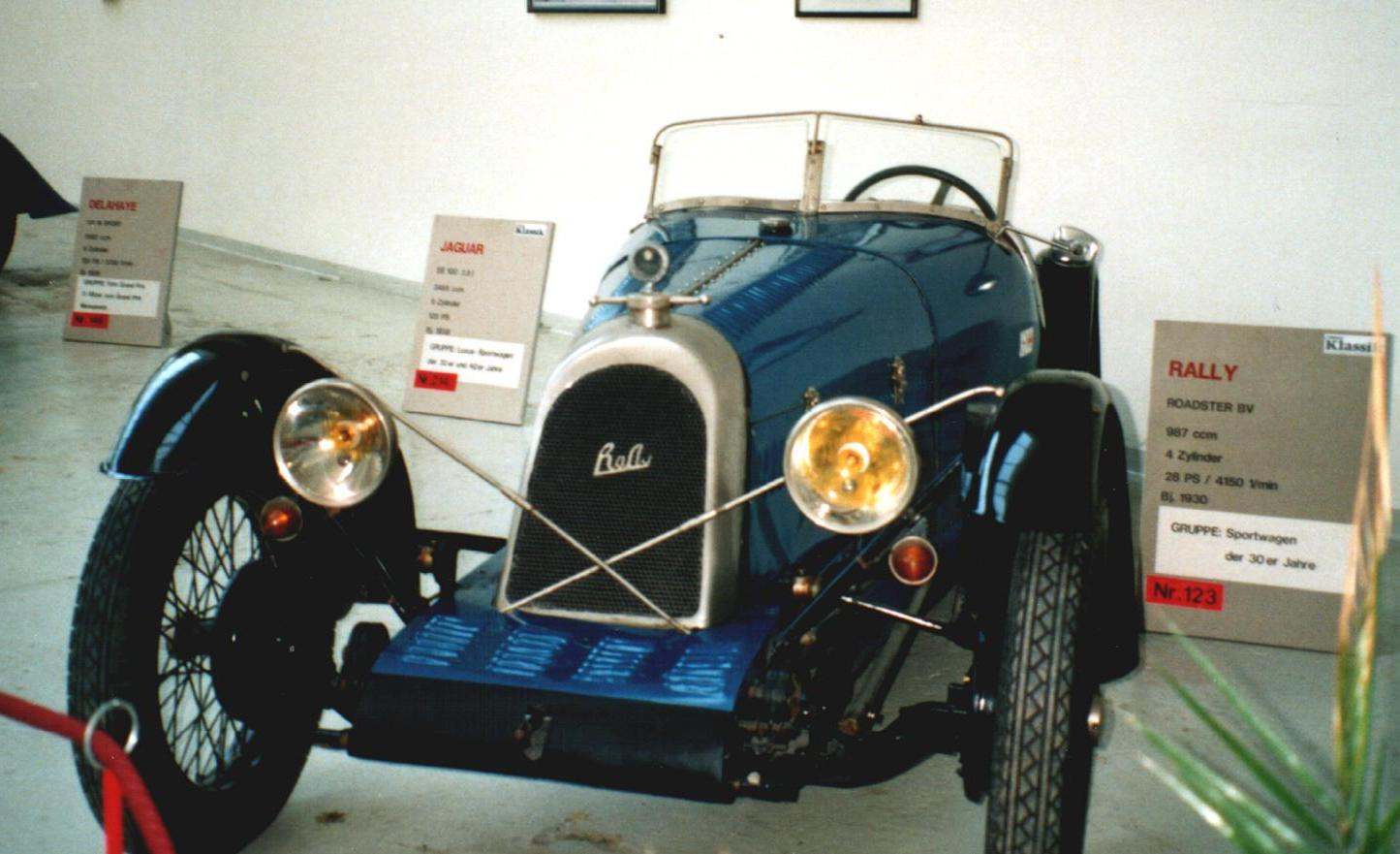
1930 Rally Roadster BV (987 cc)

The company was founded in 1921 by Eugène Affovard Asnière, an engineer. His first product was a classic cyclecar equipped with a 989 cc Harley-Davidson V-twin engine. As is typical of most producers in this category, subsequent automobiles (beginning in 1922) used proprietary engines (usually of about 1.1 litres) and transmissions from producers like Chapuis-Dornier, CIME, Ruby, or S.C.A.P. The early Rallys were long, sleek, and light and seated two. On early cars the passenger seat was mounted slightly farther back than the driver's seat, although this was later changed so as to improve comfort.

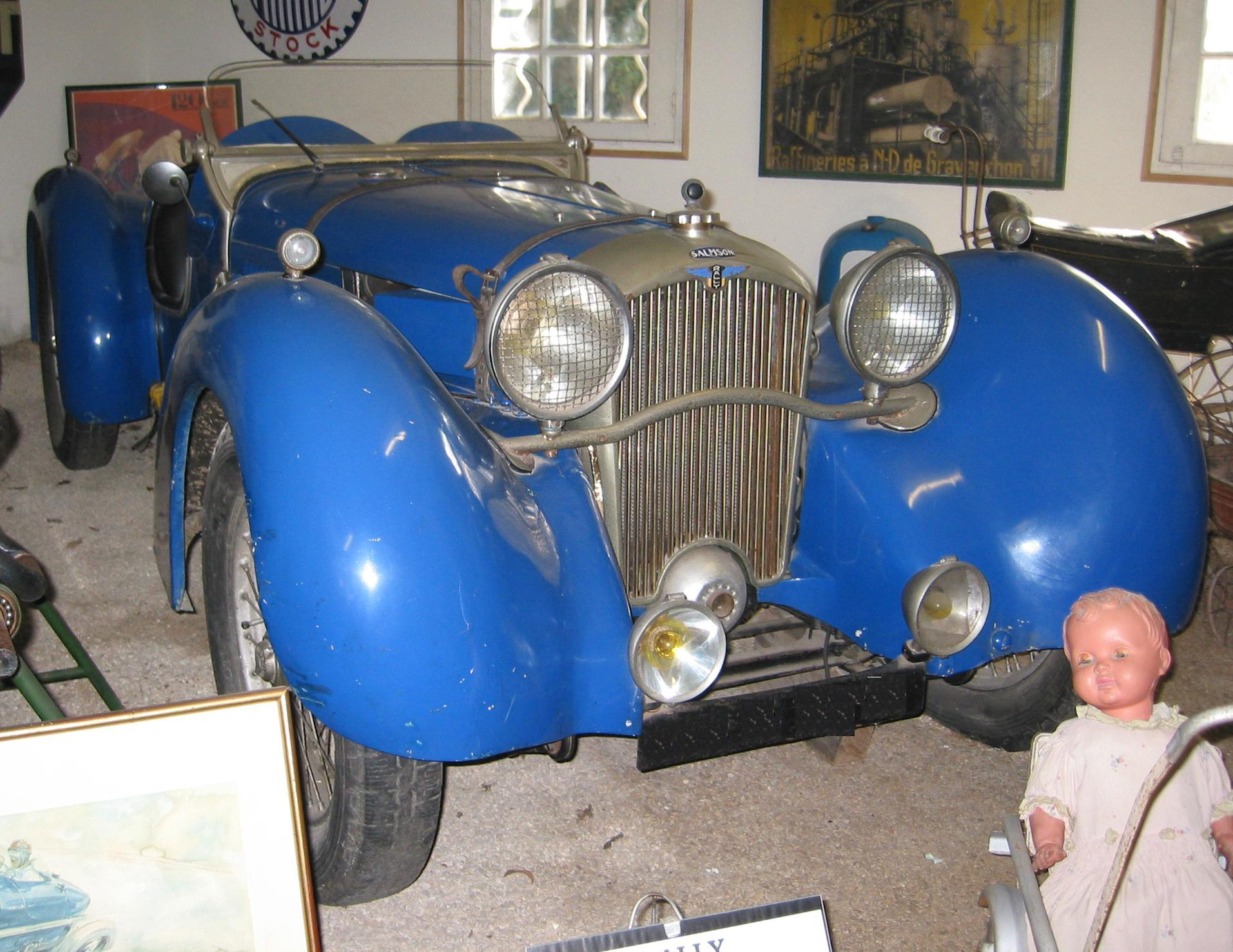
1931 Salmson-engined Rally NC

At the 1926 Paris Salon the underslung Grand Sport was shown, with a supercharged 1,093 cc Chapuis-Dornier engine of 70 PS (51 kW). This enabled a top speed of circa 180 km/h (110 mph). 14 to 16 Grand Sports were built, beginning in 1927. Three still exist. In 1928 a Grand Sport cost FF 42.900. Mechanical drum brakes and a three-speed manual transmission was the norm for Rally's cars of the twenties.

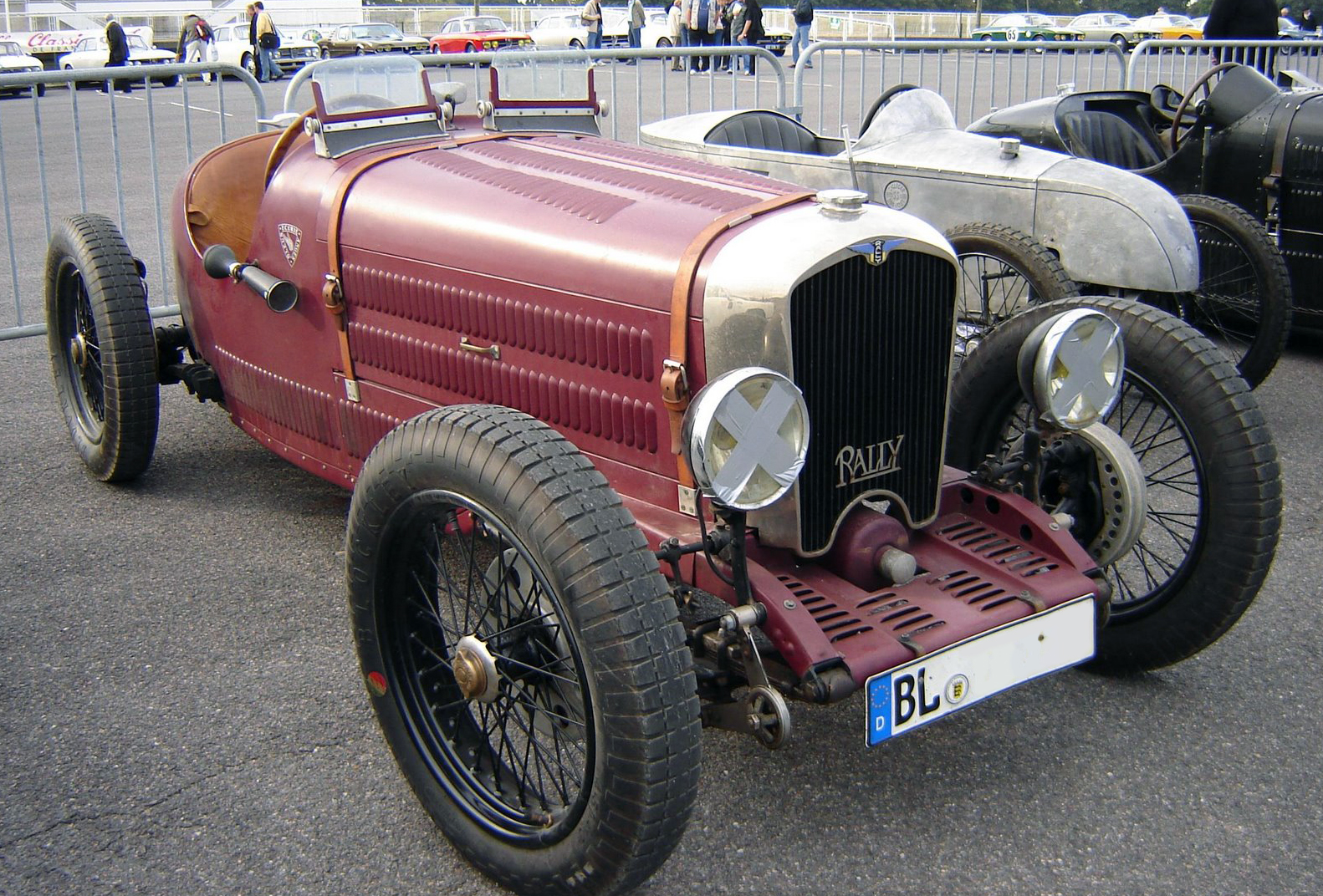
1933 Rally NCP, one of the last built

In 1927 the Rally ABC, was available with three inline-four engine options of 1,093, 1,170, or 1,494 cc. Roots superchargers were also available for some of the engines. Wheelbases ranged between 2.3 and 2.5 m (91 and 98 in), while a 31 PS (23 kW) "1100" could reach about 135 km/h (84 mph). "ABC" signified abaissée, or lowered, reflecting its underslung chassis. The ABC series was retired in 1930. From 1931 the 1,300 cc (65 x 98 mm) twin-cam Salmson S4 unit was used in the new Rally N - models, a slightly sturdier model which replaced the delicate ABC. The Salmson-engined cars also received a four-speed gearbox and often carried a "Salmson" as well as a "Rally" logo on the grille. Salmson had stopped their competition programme and were happy to allow Rally to advertise their wares. The N was also available in a more sporting short wheelbase model, the NC (for courte) and also as the more powerful NCP (courte puissante, or "short powerful"). An R-series was also briefly offered with an all-new 1,480 cc straight-eight from S.C.A.P., but this may have remained a prototype. In 1932, for Rally's last appearance at the Paris Motor Show, the new Rally R15 model was shown - it received the new 1,466 cc Salmson S4-C engine, although the smaller N series remained available.

Rally was not strong enough to survive the economic depression of the early thirties, and the company was shuttered in 1933 (or 1934) after having spent perhaps a little too much on competition efforts. A significant proportion of the limited production of Rally cars have been carefully conserved and see use in classic events.

== Competition ==
Rally ABC's took part in the 1932 and 1933 Mille Miglia road races, and finished third and fourth at the San Sebastián Grand Prix. Another ABC finished third at the 1929 "Double Twelve" (a 24-hour race broken into two parts, as nighttime racing was not permitted there) at Brooklands.

Rally type N were also entered into the Belgium Grand-Prix 24H of Spa-Francorchamps in 1931 and 1932, and won twice in the class up to 2000 cc. In 1931, Ms. Lagoute won her class at the La Course de côte internationale de la Turbie. In 1932, M. Ledur won the 1500 cc class at the Criterium international Paris-Nice. The same year, Ms. Lagoute entered the Grand-Prix international automobile du Cap d'Antibes-Juan-les-Pins and in addition won the first prize of the Grand-Prix des voitures transformables (convertibles) at the Concours d'Elégance de Vichy. In 1932 and 1933, a Rally type N was seen at the 24H of Le Mans race. A Rally NCP with a Salmson 984 cc engine took part in Le Mans in 1934, but did not finish. In 1933, Jean Danne was registered at the Monte-Carlo Rallye, to start from Valencia, Portugal. Finally, in 1935, Emile Scordel was seen at the Grand-Prix de Lorraine - Seichamps, and won in the 1500 cc sport class.
