= As-e Qadim =

As-e Qadim اس قديم
- Village
- Location within Iran
- Coordinates: 38°41′49″N 47°06′55″E
- Country: Iran
- Province: East Azerbaijan
- County: Kaleybar
- Bakhsh: Central
- Rural District: Peyghan Chayi

Population (2006)
  - Total: 121
- Time zone: UTC+3:30 (IRST)
  - Summer (DST): UTC+4:30 (IRDT)

As-e Qadim (Persian: اس قديم, also Romanized as Ās-e Qadīm; also known as Ās) is a village in Peyghan Chayi Rural District, in the Central District of Kaleybar County, East Azerbaijan Province, Iran. At the 2006 census, its population was 121, in 22 families.
