= Asparagine synthase (glutamine-hydrolysing) =

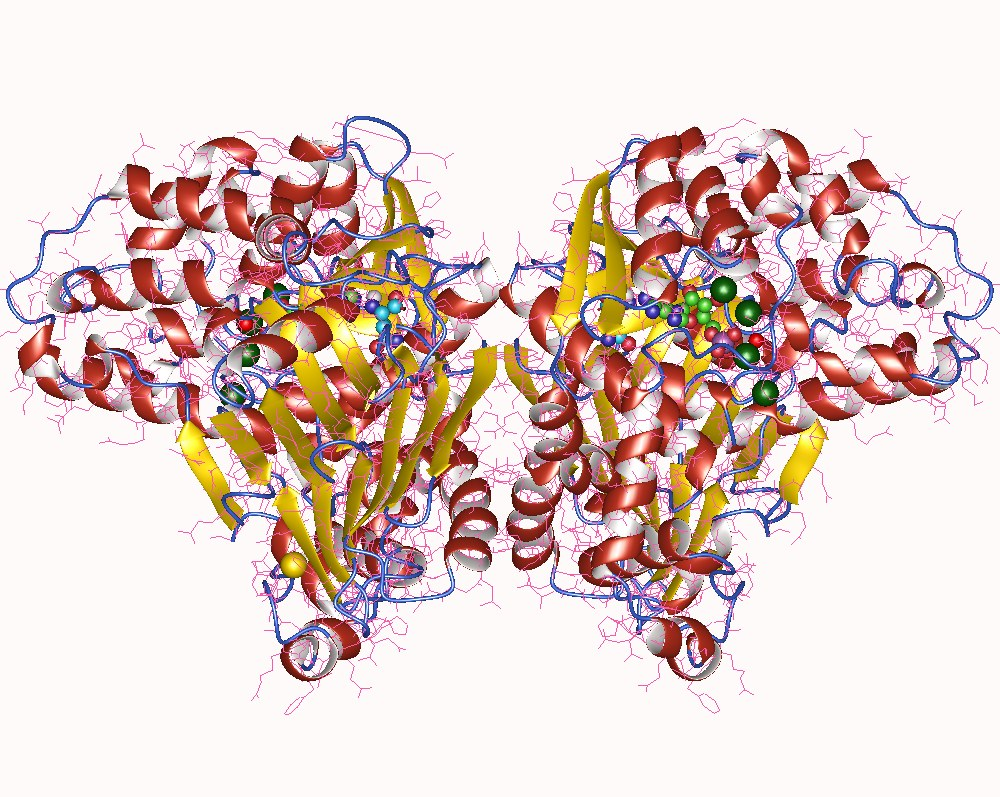
- Asparagine synthetase B dimer, E.Coli

Identifiers
- EC no.: 6.3.5.4
- CAS no.: 37318-72-2

Databases
- BRENDA: enzyme data
- ExPASy: NiceZyme view
- KEGG: enzyme entry
- MetaCyc: metabolic pathway
- Rhea: reactions
- PDB structures: RCSB PDB PDBe PDBsum
Search
- PMC: articles
- PubMed: articles
- NCBI: proteins

Asparagine synthase (glutamine-hydrolysing) (EC 6.3.5.4, asparagine synthetase (glutamine-hydrolysing), glutamine-dependent asparagine synthetase, asparagine synthetase B, AS, AS-B) is an enzyme with systematic name L-aspartate:L-glutamine amido-ligase (AMP-forming). This enzyme catalyses the following chemical reaction

ATP + L-aspartate + L-glutamine + H_{2}O $\rightleftharpoons$ AMP + diphosphate + L-asparagine + L-glutamate (overall reaction)
(1a) L-glutamine + H_{2}O $\rightleftharpoons$ L-glutamate + NH_{3}
(1b) ATP + L-aspartate + NH_{3} $\rightleftharpoons$ AMP + diphosphate + L-asparagine

The enzyme from Escherichia coli has two active sites.
