= Towarzystwo Budowy Samochodów AS =

Polish car and parts manufacturer

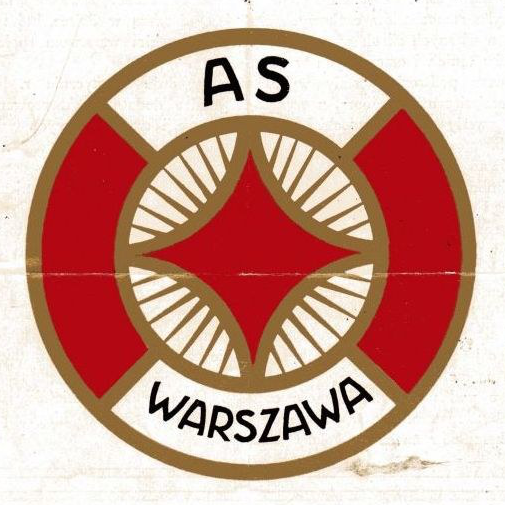
- Industry: Automotive
- Founded: 1924
- Defunct: 1939
- Headquarters: Warsaw, Poland
- Area served: Poland
- Key people: Jan Łaski (chairman); Aleksander Liberman (chairman from 1929)
- Products: Automobiles

Towarzystwo Budowy Samochodów AS (Note: Polish pronunciation: [tɔ.vaˈʐɘ̟.stfɔ buˈdɔ.vɘ̟ sa.mɔˈxɔ.duf ˈa ˈɛs]) (lit. 'AS Car Manufacturing Company') was an automobile and mechanical parts manufacturer based in Warsaw, Poland, that operated from 1924 to 1939.

== History ==
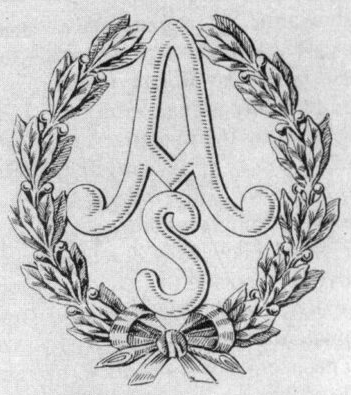
The early logo of Towarzystwo Budowy Samochodów AS.

The company was founded in 1924 by Warsaw-based businessman Jan Łaski, and an engineer Czesław Zbierański, who was an owner of Warszawskie Autowarszaty (Warsaw Car Repair Shops), a group of the assembly halls located at the 64 Złota Street, Warsaw, and where the product has been set. The headquarters of the company were based at the 16 Srebrna Street, Warsaw. They had begun working on designing the AS car, with Zbierański becoming the production manager and engineer Aleksander Liberman, designing the chassis for the car. The first prototypes were made on 4 January 1927. On 27 March 1927, the final version of the chassis was manufactured in Fabryka Powozów Braci Węgrzeckich located in Szydłowiec, Poland.

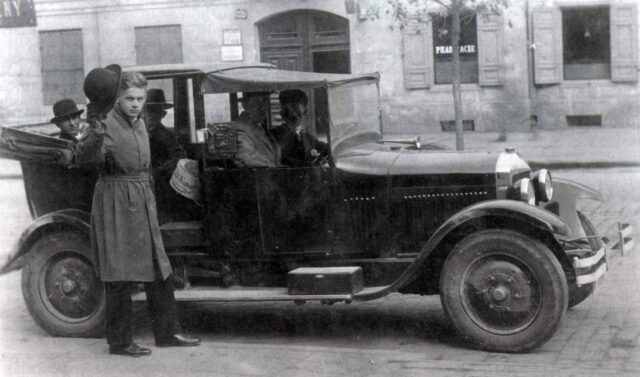
The AS S1 or AS S2 car the taxi landaulet version.

After a few months of road tests, the car had been allowed to be sold. It was manufactured in 4 car body styles: taxi landaulet, convertible, limousine and panel van. The taxi landaulet version was the most popular, having around 100 cars being made, while the other version had around 50 cars made for each one. The customers could have also ordered only the chassis, paying a lower price.

The car was manufactured in 2 versions, with different engines: S1 and S2. S1 used engine manufactured by Chapuis-Dornier while S2, by CIME. The first models of the car also used the engine made by Ruby. All engines, as well as the gearbox were imported from France. The rest of the elements of the car were manufactured in Poland.

The car manufacturing company was awarded the silver medal for its AS cars at the 1929 Polish General Exhibition in Poznań. Its cars also arouse interest at the exhibition. AS was mostly praised for its noiseless, non-resistive, and precise way of closing its doors. In 1929, Liberman bought stock shares in the company from Łaski, and become the owner of the company. The car stopped being manufactured in 1930, due to the Great Depression. There were around 150 AS cars manufactured in total. They were made in 3 series, the first two countings respectively 60 and 80 cars. The third series was planned to count 100 cars, however, only a small number of cars that series has been manufactured. In 1932, most of the machinery in the assembly line, needed for the car manufacture, had burned down in the fire.

In the second half of the 1930s, Zbierański had moved the remaining machinery and car parts to a factory in Miedzeszyn. The company manufactured the car components for various other cars, the spare parts to AS cars, and to various other cars and planes, as well as various bevel and spur gears. It ceased to exist with the annexation of Poland in the invasion by Nazi Germany in 1939, which began the World War II.

== Vehicle models ==
- AS S1
- AS S2
