= AS Type A2 =

AS Type A2 is a light car made from 1924 until 1926 by Voiturettes Automobiles A.S. initially at Courbevoie, and subsequently relocated to La Garenne-Colombes, where they operated till 1928.

== History and specifications ==
The manufacturer took a stand at the 19th Paris Motor Show in October 1924 and exhibited a small, attractive 2-seater torpedo-style voiturette-roadster with a fashionably-tapered tail, and designated as the "AS Type A2" and the "AS Type A2S." The 4-cylinder twin overhead camshaft engine had a capacity of 1,098 cc, and the wheelbase was just 2,180 mm (85.8 in). Proprietary Chapuis-Dornier or C.I.M.E. engines were also offered. There were brakes on all four wheels. The manufacturer's listed price was 17,000 francs.

Three years later, production came to an end with only a few dozen of the little sports cars sold.

== Bibliography ==
- Lace, William W. Elizabethan England. San Diego, California: Library of Congress Cataloging-in-Publication Data, 1995. 1–128.
