= Alfa Romeo 6C =

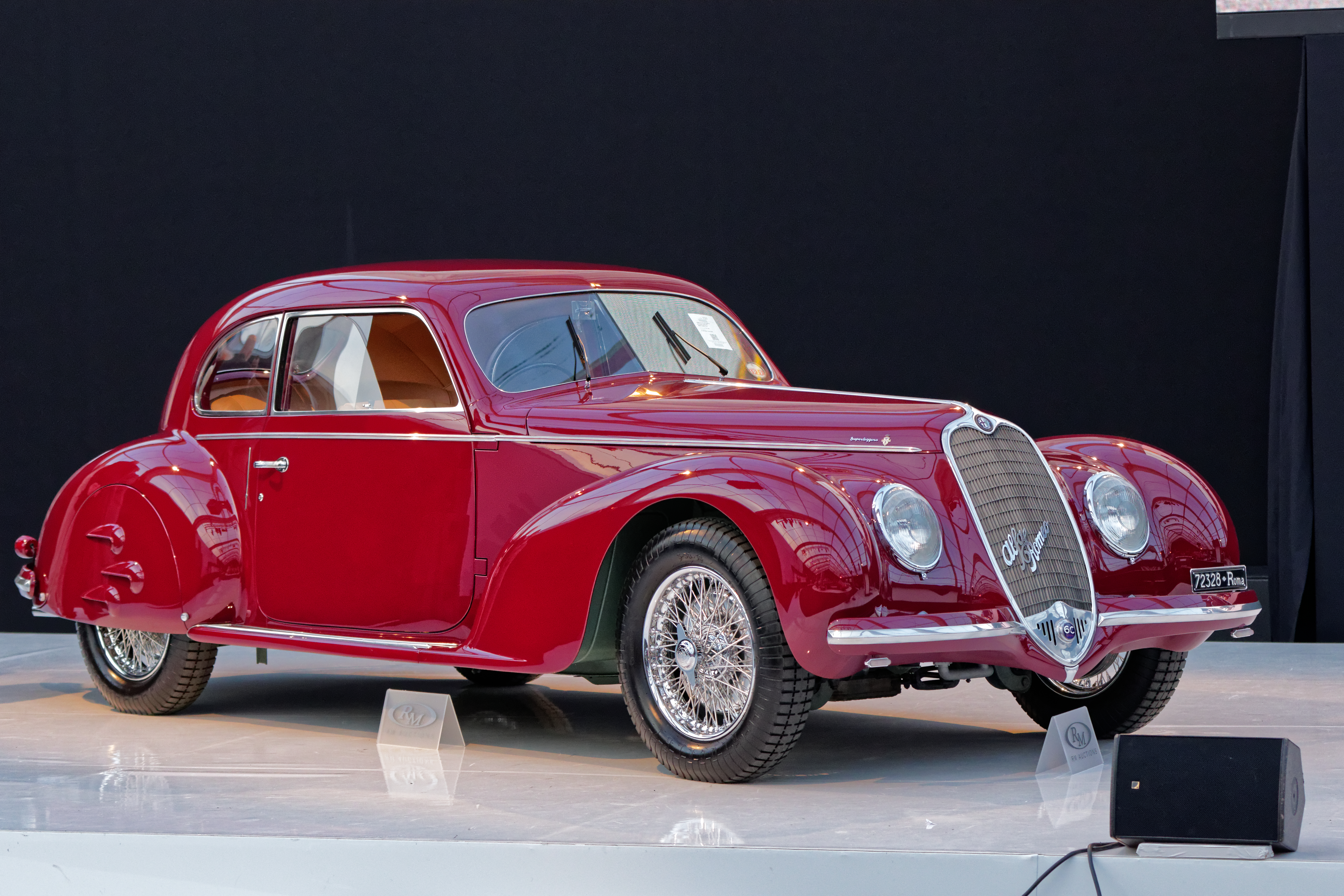
- 1939 Alfa Romeo 6C 2500 Touring Superleggera Berlinetta

Overview
- Manufacturer: Alfa Romeo
- Production: 1927–1954
- Assembly: Italy: Portello Plant, Milan

Body and chassis
- Class: Luxury car Sports car Racing car
- Layout: Front-engine, rear-wheel-drive

Powertrain
- Engine: Straight-six

Chronology
- Predecessor: Alfa Romeo RM
- Successor: Alfa Romeo 1900

The Alfa Romeo 6C name was used on road, race, and sports cars produced between 1927 and 1954 by Alfa Romeo; the "6C" name refers to the six cylinders of the car's straight-six engine. Bodies for these cars were made by coachbuilders such as James Young, Zagato, Touring Superleggera, Castagna, and Pinin Farina. Beginning in 1933 there was also a 6C version with an Alfa factory body, built in Portello. In the early 1920s Vittorio Jano received a commission to create a lightweight, high performance vehicle to replace the Giuseppe Merosi designed RL and RM models. The car was introduced in April 1925 at the Salone dell' Automobile di Milano as the 6C 1500. It was based on Alfa's P2 Grand Prix car, using a single overhead cam 1,487 cc in-line six-cylinder engine, producing 44 horsepower. In 1928 the 1500 Sport was presented, which was the first Alfa Romeo road car with double overhead camshafts.

== 6C 1500 (1927–1929) ==
Alfa Romeo 6C 1500
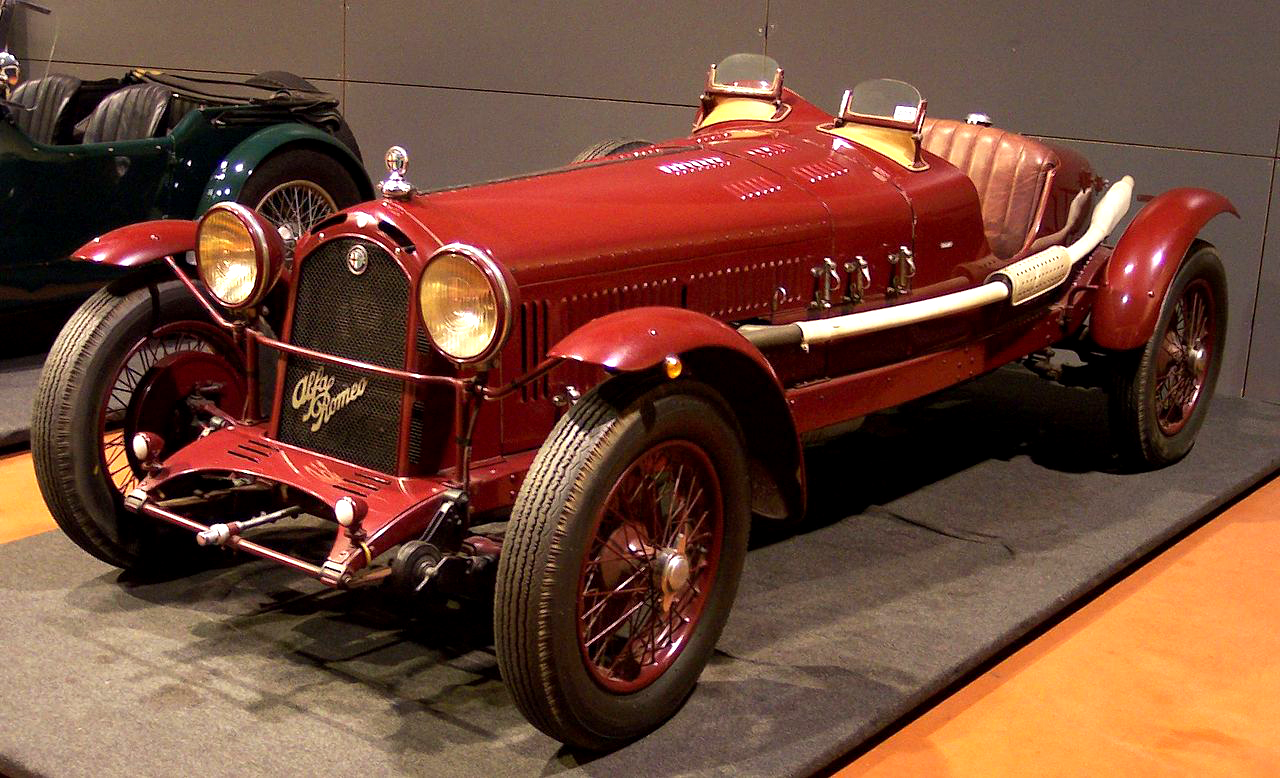
- 1929 6C 1500 Super Sport, 1929, in the Louwman Collection

Overview
- Production: 1927–1929

Powertrain
- Engine: 1.5 L (1,487 cc) I6; 1.5 L (1,487 cc) supercharged I6
- Transmission: 4-speed manual

Dimensions
- Wheelbase: 2,900 mm (114.2 in) 4-seater; 3,100 mm (122.0 in) 6-str., Normale; 2,920 mm (115.0 in) Sport, S.S.

In the mid-1920s, Alfa's RL was considered too large and heavy, so a new development began. The 2-litre formula that had led to Alfa Romeo winning the Automobile World Championship in 1925, changed to 1.5-litres for the 1926 season. The 6C 1500 was introduced in 1925 at the Milan Motor Show. Series production started in 1927, with the P2 Grand Prix car as a starting point.The Alfa Romeo 6C-1500 Super Sport features a twin overhead cam six cylinder engine with a bore of 62 mm and stroke of 82 mm, giving a displacement of 1487 cc, as against the P2's 1,987 cc, while supercharging was dropped. First versions were bodied by James Young and Carrozzeria Touring.

In 1928, the 6C Sport model was released, with a dual overhead-camshaft engine. Its sport version won many races, including the 1928 Mille Miglia. Total production was 3,000 (200 with DOHC engines). Ten examples of a supercharged (compressore, compressor) Super Sport variant were also built.

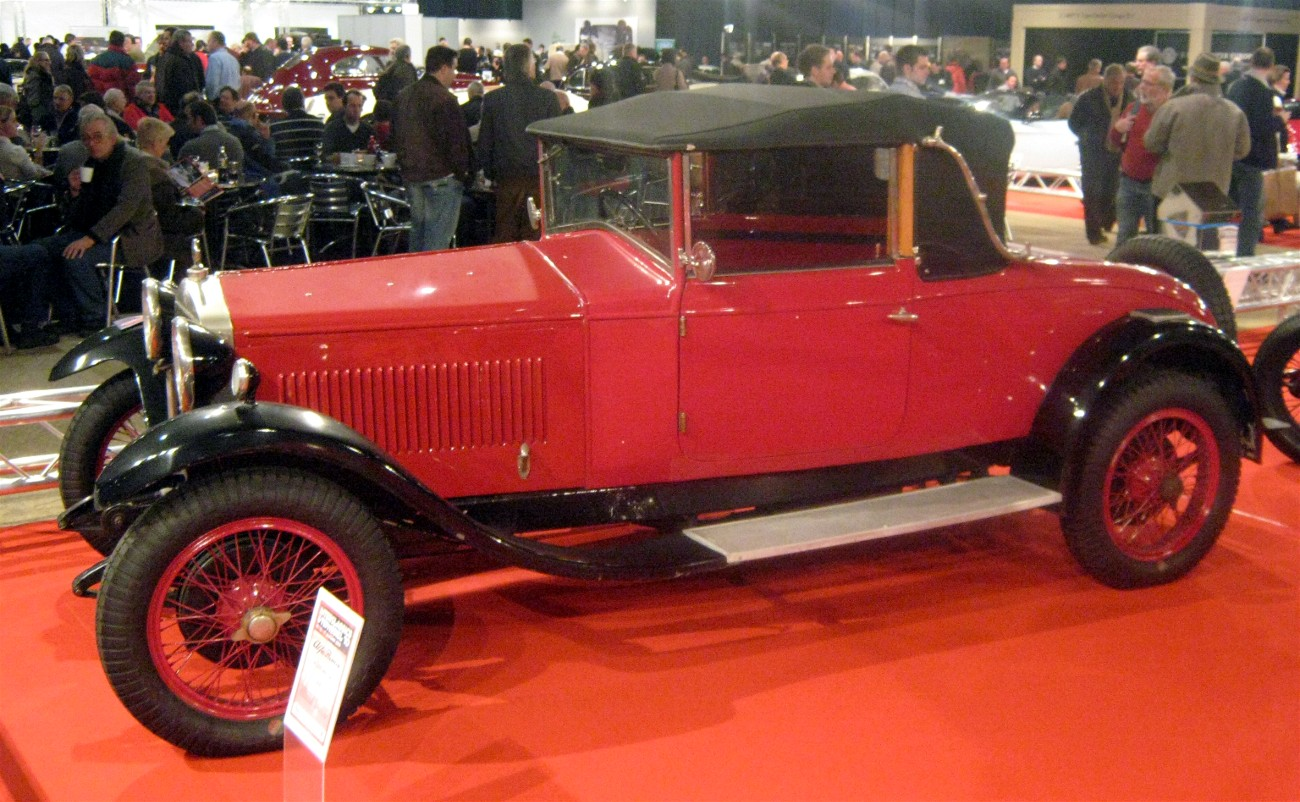
6C 1500 James Young Drophead Coupe, 1928

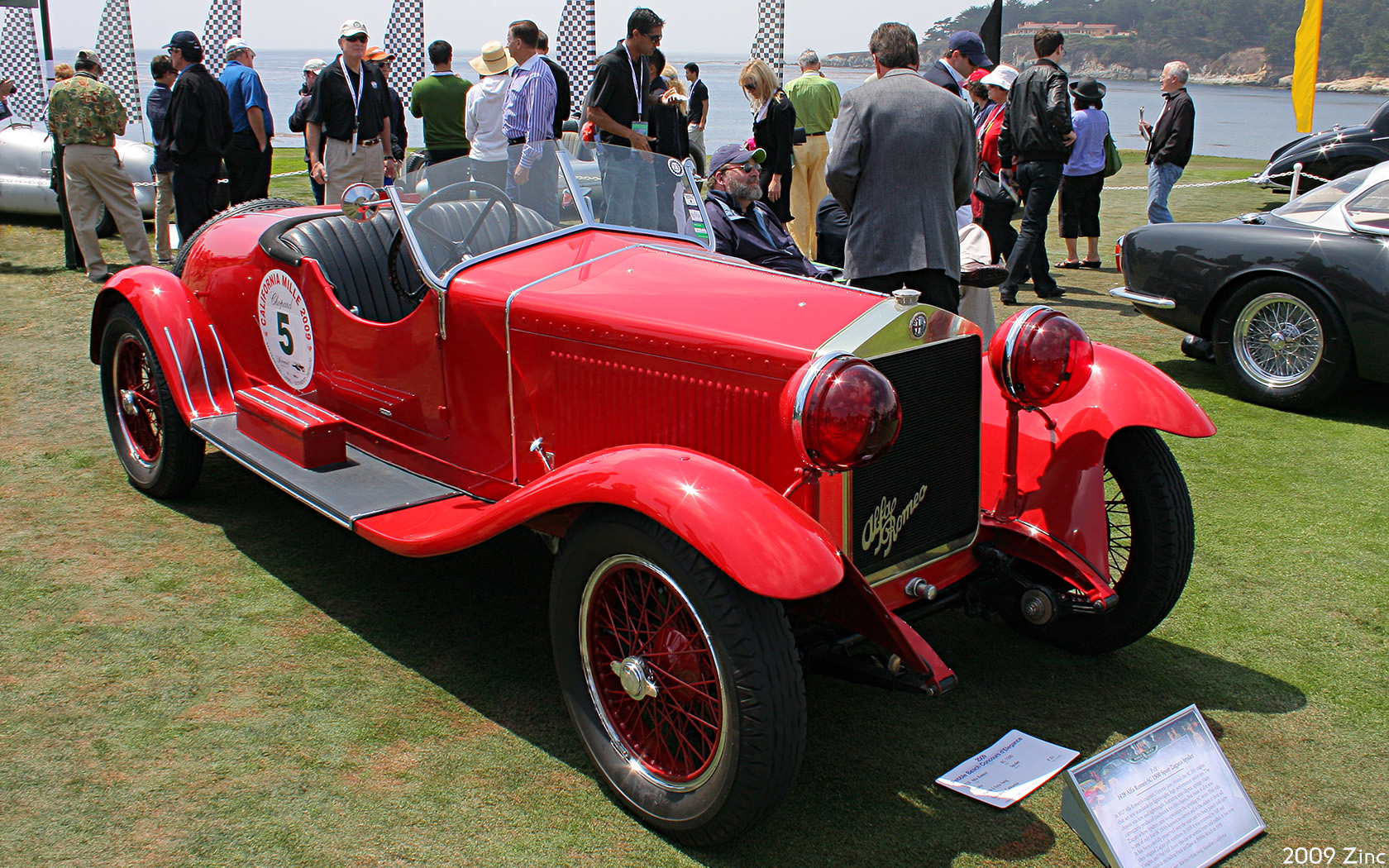
6C 1500 Sport Zagato Spider, 1928

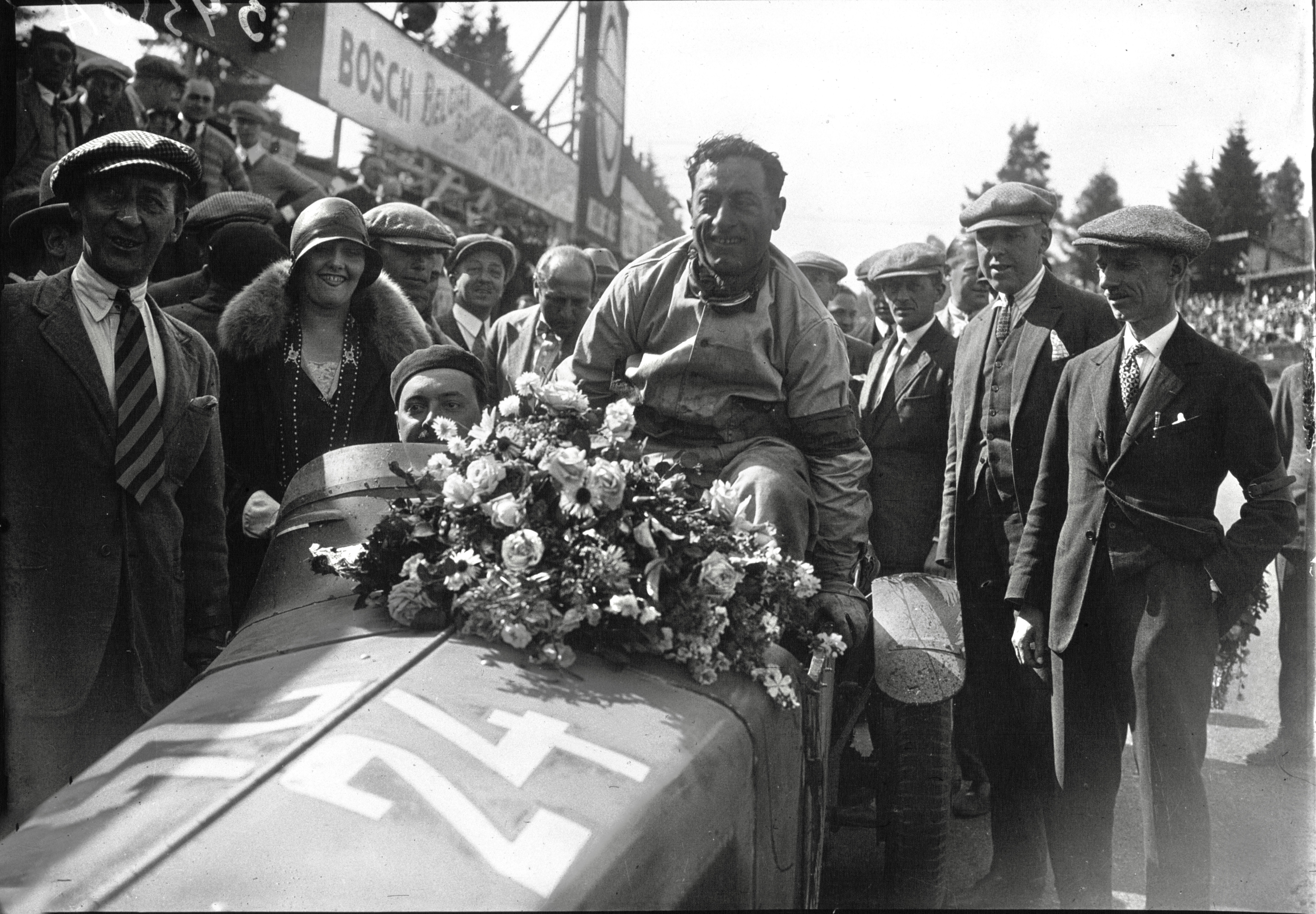
Alfa Romeo 6C 1500 Sport, Boris Ivanowski and Attilio Marinoni, winners of the 1928 24 Hours of Spa.

=== Specifications ===
| Model | Years | Crankcase/block/head construction | Valvetrain | Compr. ratio | Fuel system | Peak power | Top speed |
|---|---|---|---|---|---|---|---|
| Normale | 1927–29 | Alum./iron, monobloc | SOHC | 5.75:1 | Single carburettor | 44 bhp (33 kW) at 4,200 rpm | 110 km/h (68 mph) |
| Sport | 1928–29 | Alum./iron/iron | DOHC | 6.0:1 | Single carburettor | 54 bhp (40 kW) at 4,500 rpm | 125 km/h (78 mph) |
| Super Sport | 1928–29 | Alum./iron/iron | DOHC | 6.75:1 | Twin choke carburettor | 60 bhp (45 kW) at 4,800 rpm | 125 km/h (78 mph) |
| Super Sport; Compressore | 1928–29 | Alum./iron/iron | DOHC | 5.25:1 | Single carburettor, supercharger | 76 bhp (57 kW) at 4,800 rpm | 140 km/h (87 mph) |
| Super Sport; Testa Fissa | 1928–29 | Alum./iron, monobloc | DOHC | 5.25:1 | Single carburettor, supercharger | 84 bhp (63 kW) at 5,000 rpm | 155 km/h (96 mph) |

=== Production ===
Alfa Romeo 6C 1500, production by model
| Model | 4-seater | 6-seater | Normale | Sport | Super Sport; Compressore | Super Sport | Total |
| Series | I | I | II | II | II | II | I–II |
| Prod. years | 1927–28 | 1927–28 | 1928–29 | 1928–29 | 1929 | 1929 | 1927–29 |
| Prod. number | 56 | 506 | 300 | 171 | 15 | 10 | 1,058 |
| 1927 | 6 | 356 | 0 | 0 | 0 | 0 | 362 |
| 1928 | 50 | 150 | 170 | 157 | 0 | 0 | 527 |
| 1929 | 0 | 0 | 130 | 14 | 15 | 10 | 169 |

== 6C 1750 (1929–1933) ==
Alfa Romeo 6C 1750
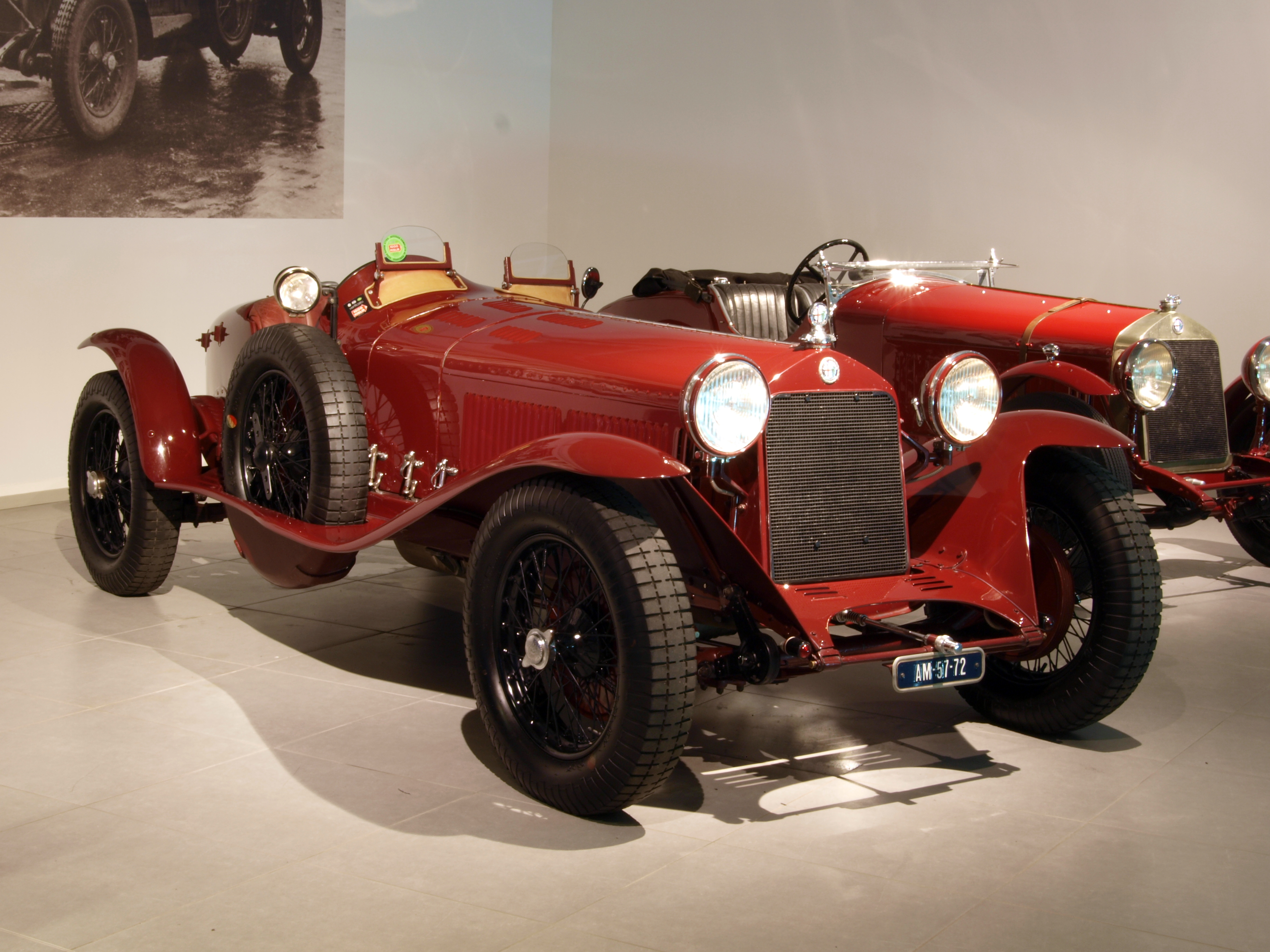
- 1931 6C 1750 Super Gran Sport Testa Fissa

Overview
- Production: 1929–1933

Body and chassis
- Body style: 4-door saloon; 4-door torpedo; 2-door cabriolet; 2-door spider

Powertrain
- Engine: 1.7 L (1,752 cc) I6; 1.7 L (1,752 cc) supercharged I6
- Transmission: 4-speed manual

Dimensions
- Wheelbase: 3,100 mm (122.0 in) Turismo; 2,920 mm (115.0 in) Sport, G.T.; 3,160 mm (124.4 in) G.T. Compr.; 2,745 mm (108.1 in) S.S., G.S.

The more powerful 6C 1750 (1,752 cc, 65 x 88 mm) was introduced in 1929 in Rome. The car had a top speed of 153 km/h (95 mph), a chassis designed to flex and undulate over uneven surfaces, as well as sensitive geared-up steering. It was produced in six series between 1929 and 1933. The base model had a single overhead cam. Super Sport and Gran Sport versions had a double overhead cam engine (DOHC). Again, a supercharger was available. Most of the cars were sold as rolling chassis and bodied by coachbuilders such as Zagato, and Touring Superleggera. Additionally there were 3 examples built with James Young bodywork, one of which is a part of the permanent collection at the Simeone Foundation Automotive Museum in Philadelphia, PA, USA, in original and unrestored condition.

In 1929, the 6C won every major racing event in which it was entered, including the Grands Prix of Belgium, Spain, Tunis and Monza, and the Mille Miglia was won by Giuseppe Campari and Giulio Ramponi. The car also won the Brooklands Double Twelve and the Ulster TT. In 1930 the car again won the Mille Miglia and Spa 24 Hours. Total production was 2,635.

=== Gallery of models ===
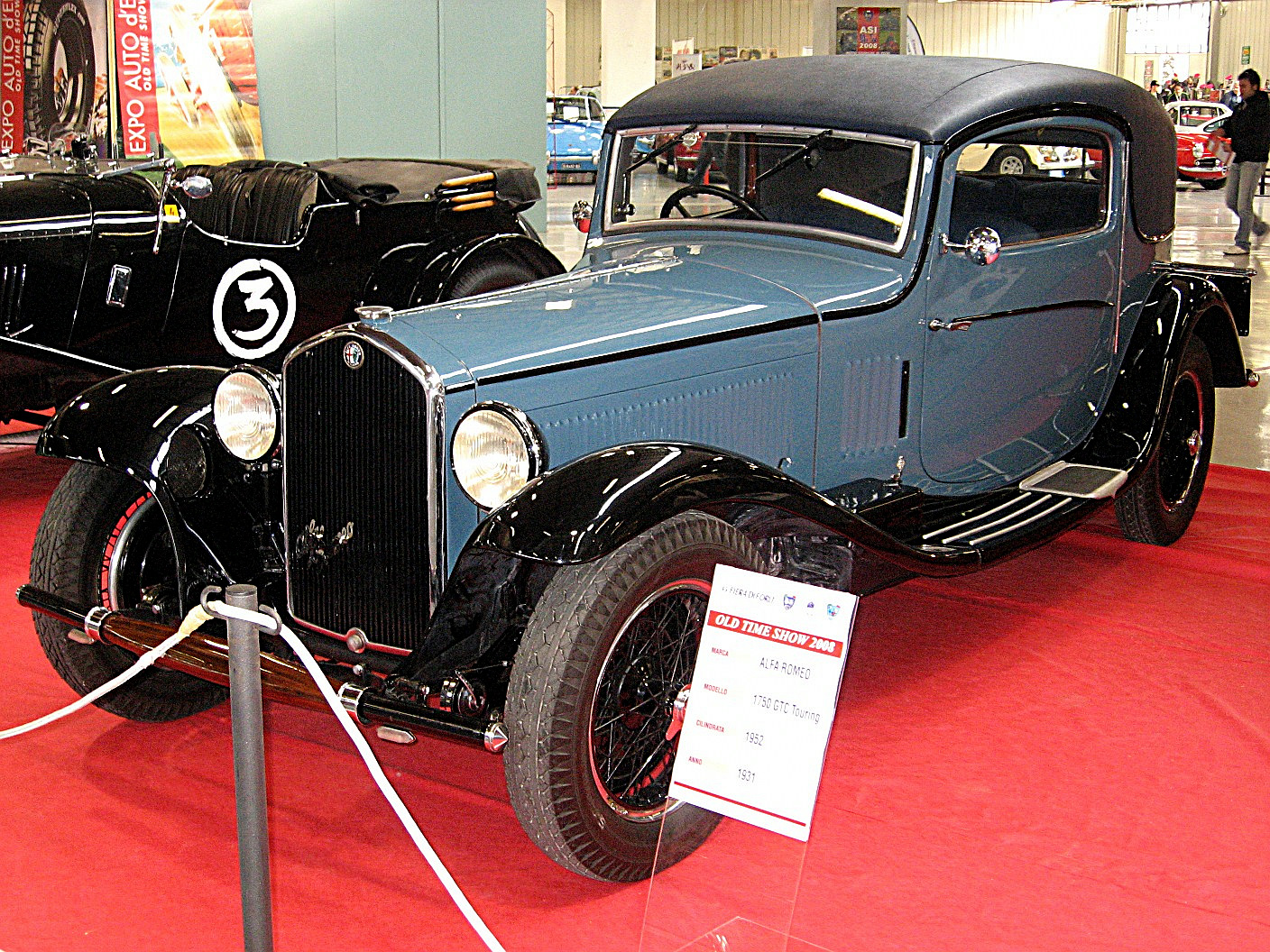
6C 1750 Gran Turismo Compressore Touring Superleggera, 1931

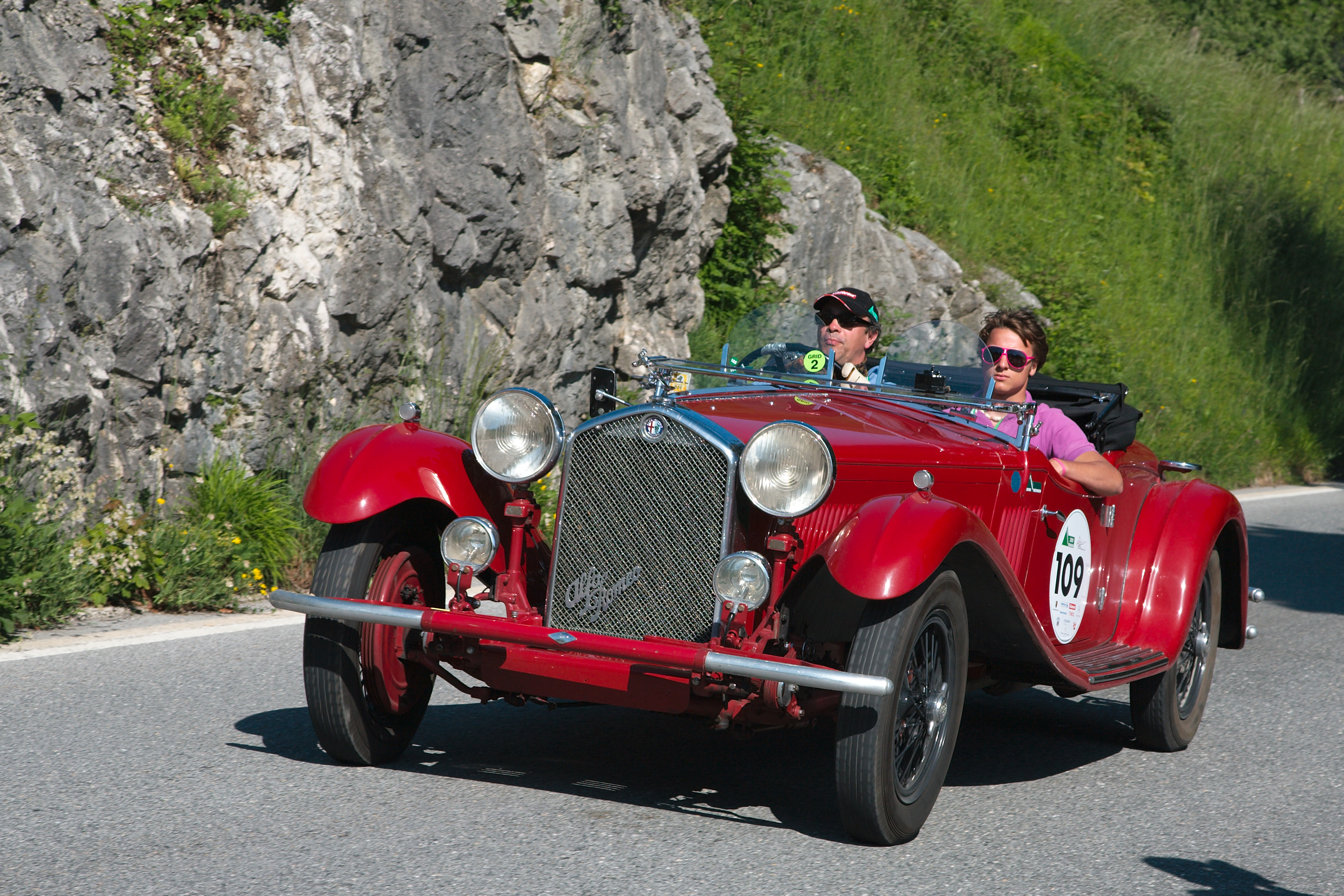
6C 1750 Gran Turismo Compressore, 1932

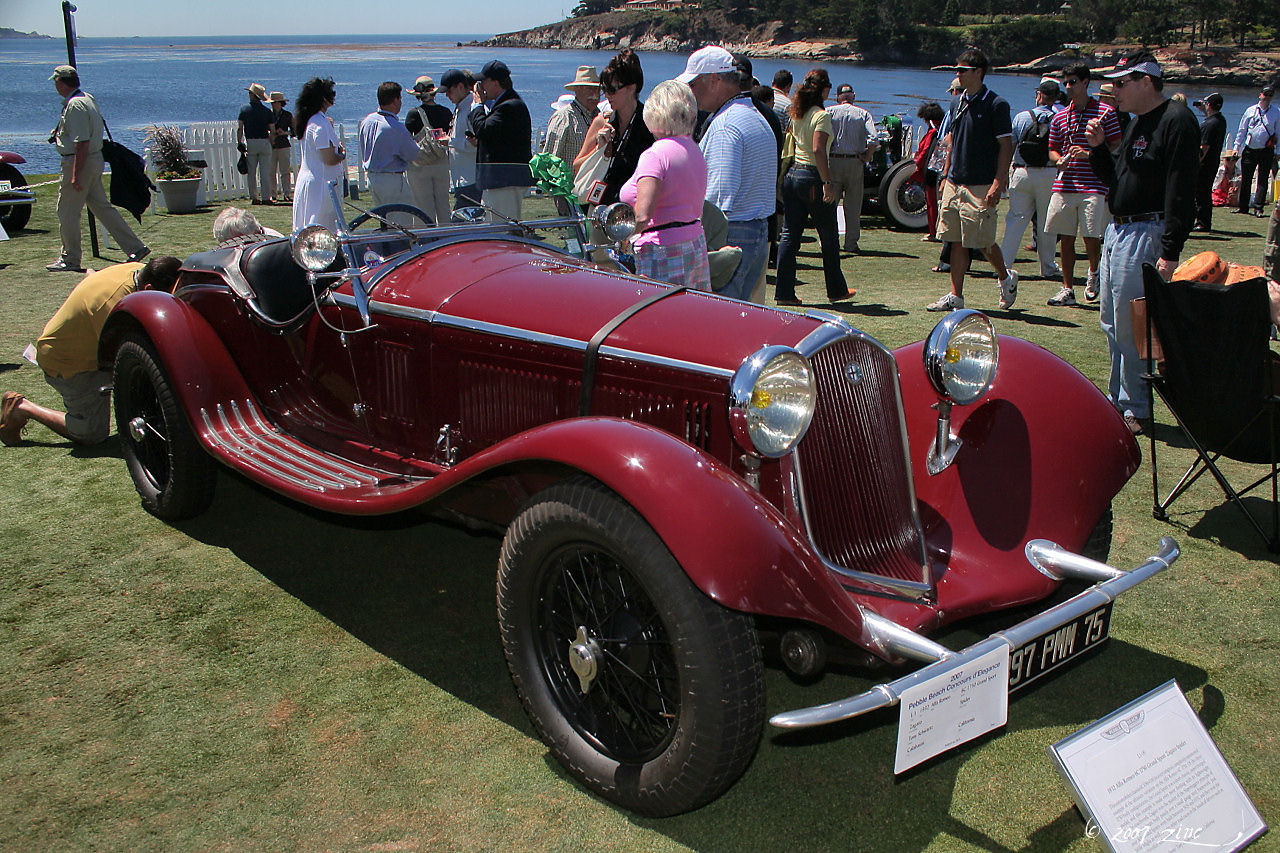
6C 1750 Gran Sport Zagato

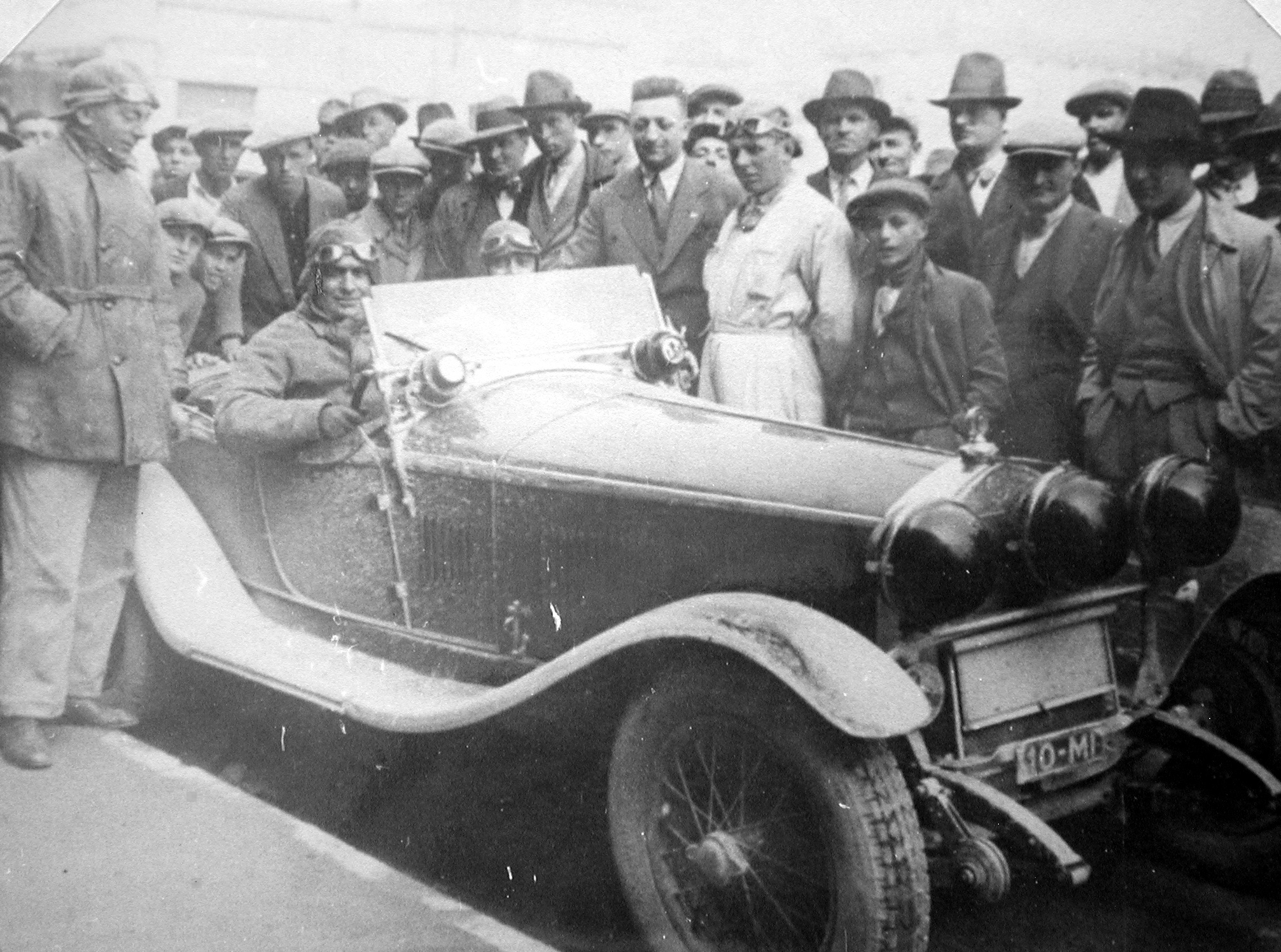
Giuseppe Campari on Alfa Romeo 6C 1750 Compressore; standing in centre (from left) Enzo Ferrari and Achille Varzi

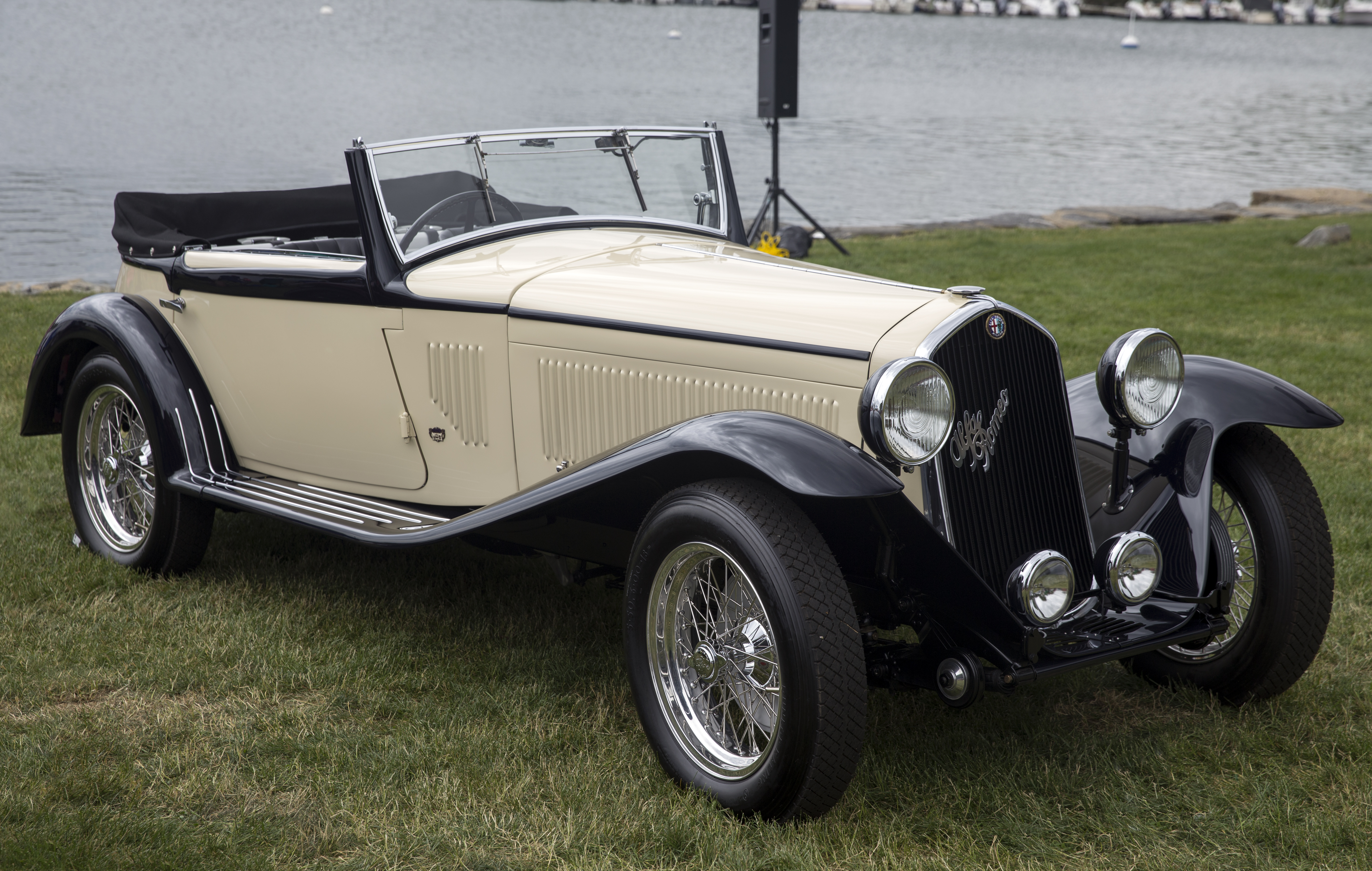
6C 1750 Gran Sport by Castagna, 1933

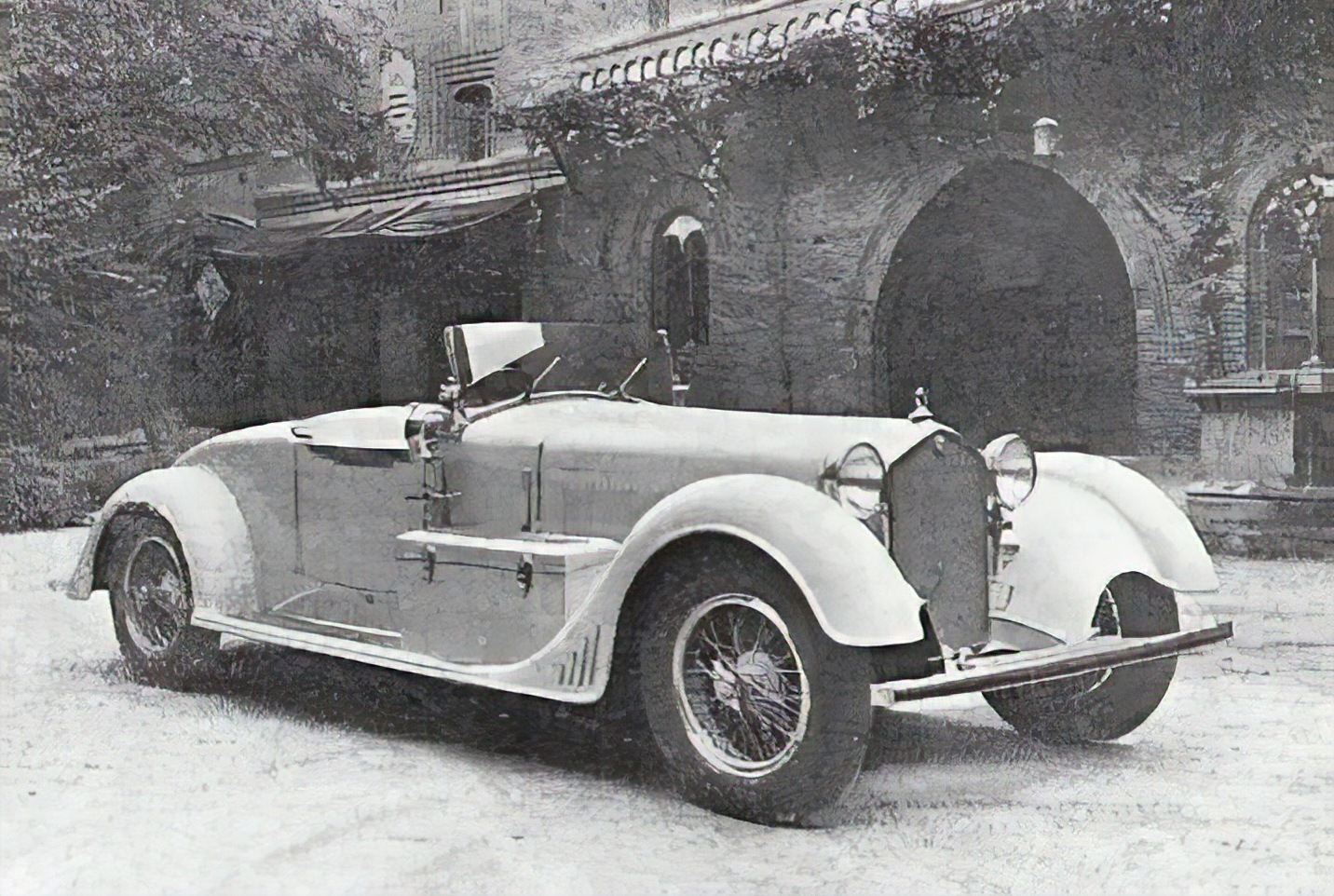
Alfa Romeo 6C 1750 Garavini

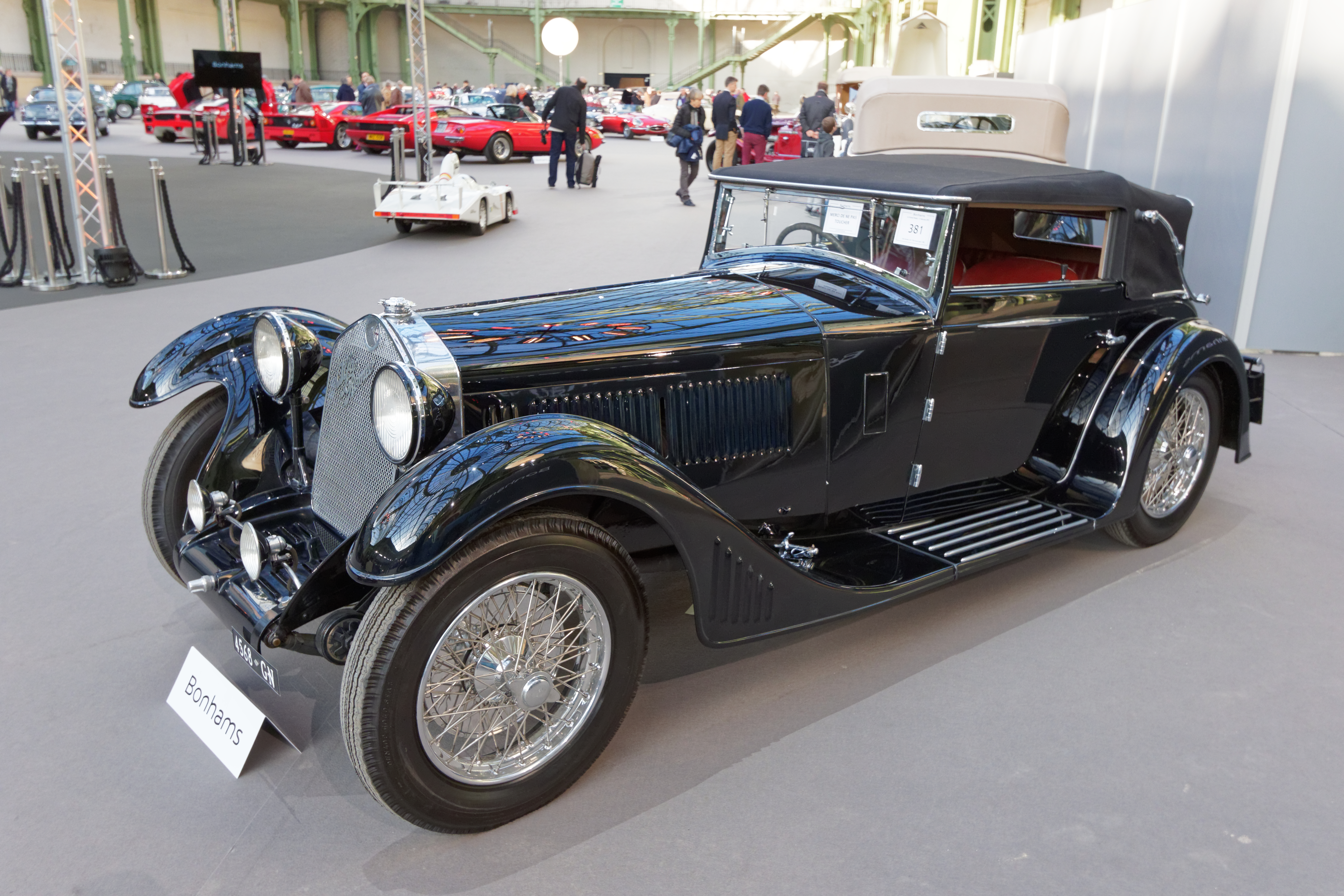
1930 Alfa Romeo 6C 1750 by James Young

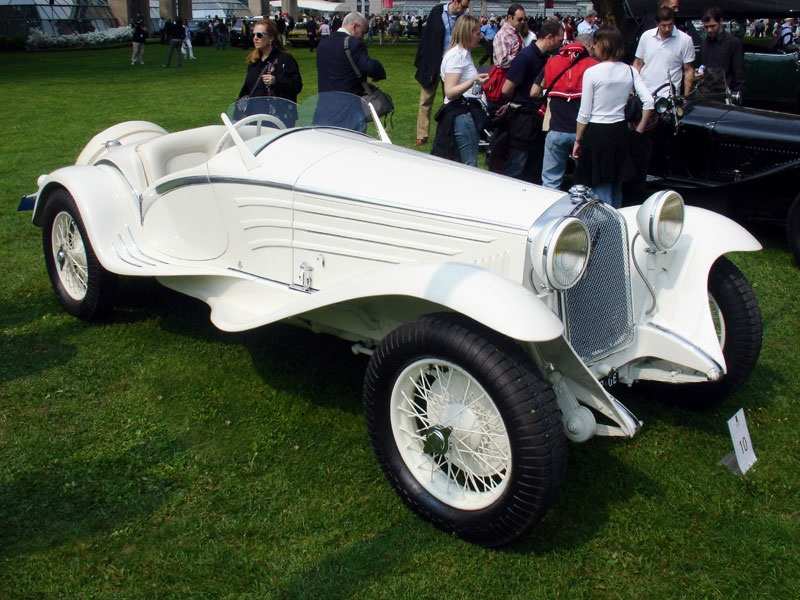
1931 Alfa Romeo 6C 1750 GS Touring Superleggera 'Flying Star' - built specifically for the 1931 Concorso d’Eleganza Villa d’Este.

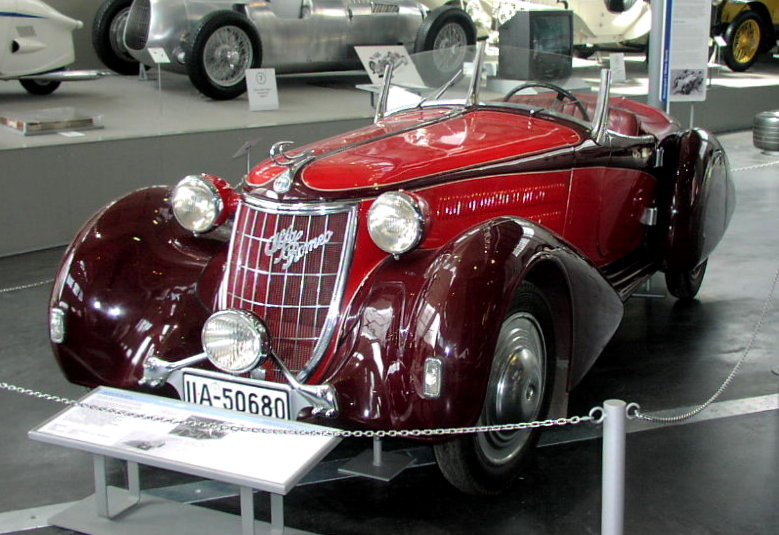
1931 6C 1750 Gran Sport with bodywork by Walter Freund.

=== 6C 1750 GS Zagato/Aprile ===
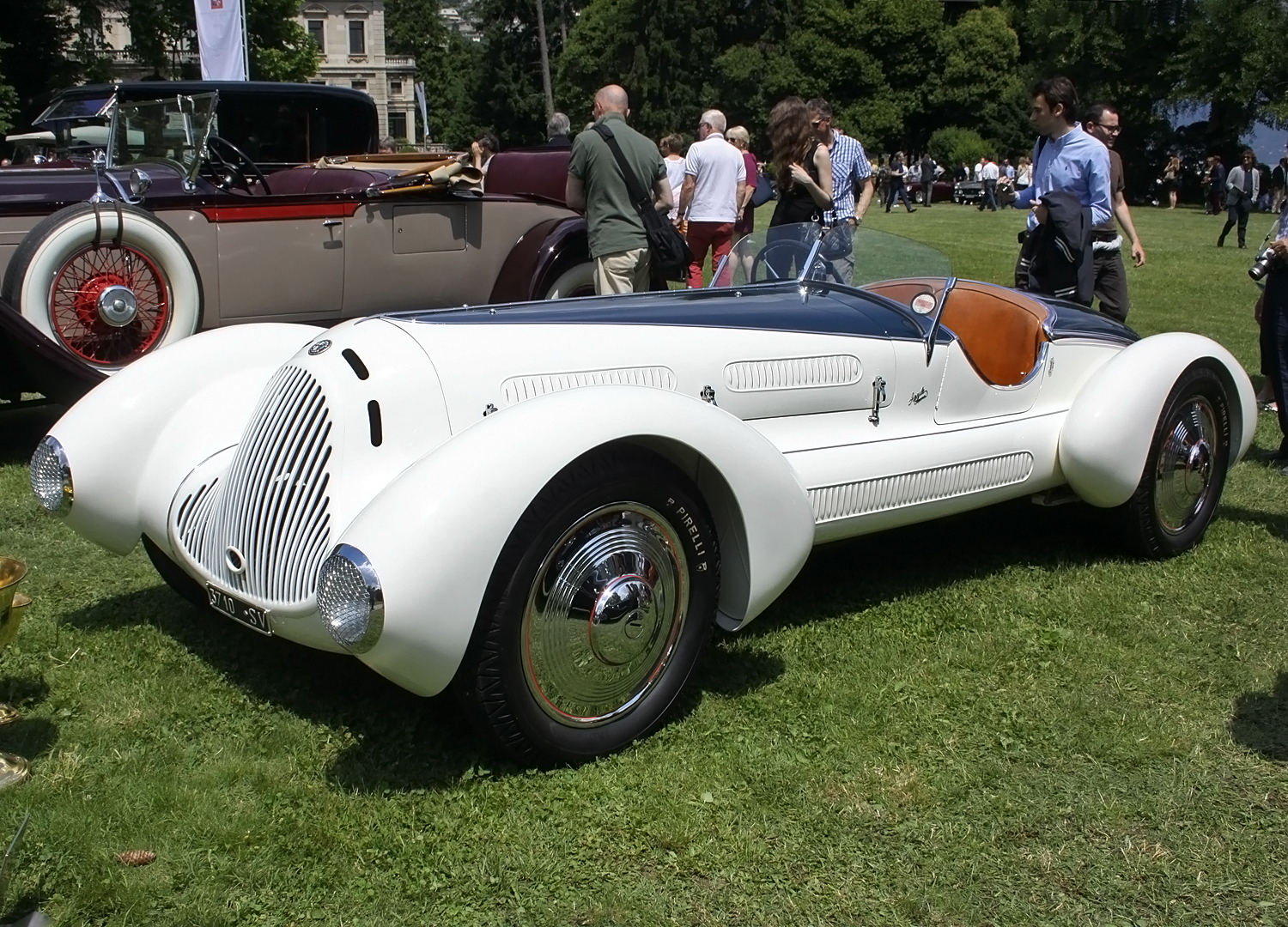
Lopresto's 6C 1750 GS Zagato-Aprile at Rétromobile, Paris, 2015

The 1931 6C 1750 with license plate number "3710 SV" and chassis/engine number #10814331, which is currently owned by notorious rare car collector Corrado Lopresto, is a unique example, whose story is told in Lopresto's bilingual 2015 Skira book Best in Show – Capolavori dell'auto italiana dalla collezione Lopresto – Italian Cars Masterpieces from the Lopresto Collection.

The English-language section about this car tells:

Born with a spider body by Zagato, this car is a 6C 1750 Gran Sport with Compressor, the sportiest version of the Milanese 6-cylinder, and was sold new to Giovanni Battista Aldo Barabini of Genova in 1931.
After several changes of ownership the car goes back to Alfa Romeo, to be resold in 1933 to Dino Carabba, who in 1934 enrolls in the Varese-Campo dei Fiori [rally], coming in fourth in class and eleventh overall.
In those years, the 6C probably runs in minor races, changing hands three times before being sold to the body shop Giuseppe Aprile of Savona, in August 1938. Less than a year after, the car is purchased by Brunello Feltri of Altare, province of Savona, but meanwhile, Aprile has completely rebuilt the body of the car with a new ["more" is written here in the Italian-language section] modern and elegant look.
The design, so well executed, indicates the work of the most famous designer of that time: Mario Revelli di Beaumont, father of this and many other beautiful bodies.
The car so transformed survives the war unscathed and changes ownership again in 1956, in Liguria, where it remains still today, rediscovery yet in order [sic], although with some modifications.
The painstaking restoration work has restored it to its original splendor, as well conceived by Revelli: a unique car that blends the great elegance to the sporty temperament of mechanics.

A plush version of the car, manufactured by Vitale Barberis Canonico, was also given, together with the book, to some of Lopresto's friends.

=== Specifications ===
| Model | Years | Crankcase/block/head construction | Valvetrain | Compr. ratio | Fuel system | Peak power | Top speed |
|---|---|---|---|---|---|---|---|
| Turismo | 1929–33 | Alum./iron/iron | SOHC | 5.5:1 | Single carburettor | 46 bhp (34 kW) at 4,000 rpm | 110 km/h (68 mph) |
| Sport | 1929 | Alum./iron/iron | DOHC | 5.75:1 | Single carburettor | 55 bhp (41 kW) at 4,400 rpm | 125 km/h (78 mph) |
| Gran Turismo | 1930–32 | Alum./iron/iron | DOHC | 5.75:1 | Single carburettor | 55 bhp (41 kW) at 4,400 rpm | 125 km/h (78 mph) |
| Gran Turismo; Compressore | 1931–32 | Alum./iron/iron | DOHC | 5.0:1 | Single carburettor, supercharger | 80 bhp (60 kW) at 4,400 rpm | 135 km/h (84 mph) |
| Super Sport | 1929 | Alum./iron/iron | DOHC | 6.25:1 | Twin choke carburettor | 64 bhp (48 kW) at 4,500 rpm | 130 km/h (81 mph) |
| Super Sport; Compressore | 1929 | Alum./iron/iron | DOHC | 5.0:1 | Single carburettor, supercharger | 85 bhp (63 kW) at 4,500 rpm | 145 km/h (90 mph) |
| Gran Sport | 1930–32 | Alum./iron/iron | DOHC | 5.0:1 | Single carburettor, supercharger | 85 bhp (63 kW) at 4,500 rpm | 145 km/h (90 mph) |
| Super Sport; Testa Fissa | 1929 | Alum./iron, monobloc | DOHC | 5.0:1 | Single carburettor, supercharger | 85 bhp (63 kW) at 4,800 rpm | 165 km/h (103 mph) |
| Gran Sport; Testa Fissa | 1930–32 | Alum./iron, monobloc | DOHC | 5.0:1 | Single carburettor, supercharger | 102 bhp (76 kW) at 5,000 rpm | 170 km/h (110 mph) |
| Gran Sport | 1933 | Alum./iron/alum. | DOHC | 5.0:1 | Single carburettor, supercharger | 85 bhp (63 kW) at 4,500 rpm | 135 km/h (84 mph) |

=== Production ===
Alfa Romeo 6C 1750, production by model
| Model | Turismo | Sport | Gran Turismo | Gran Turismo; Compressore | Super Sport | Gran Sport | Total |
| Series | III, IV | III | IV, V | IV | III | IV, V, VI | III–VI |
| Prod. years | 1929–33 | 1929 | 1930–32 | 1932 | 1929 | 1930–33 | 1929–33 |
| Prod. number | 1,131 | 268 | 652 | 159 | 112 | 257 | 2,579 |

== 6C 1900 (1933) ==
Alfa Romeo 6C 1900
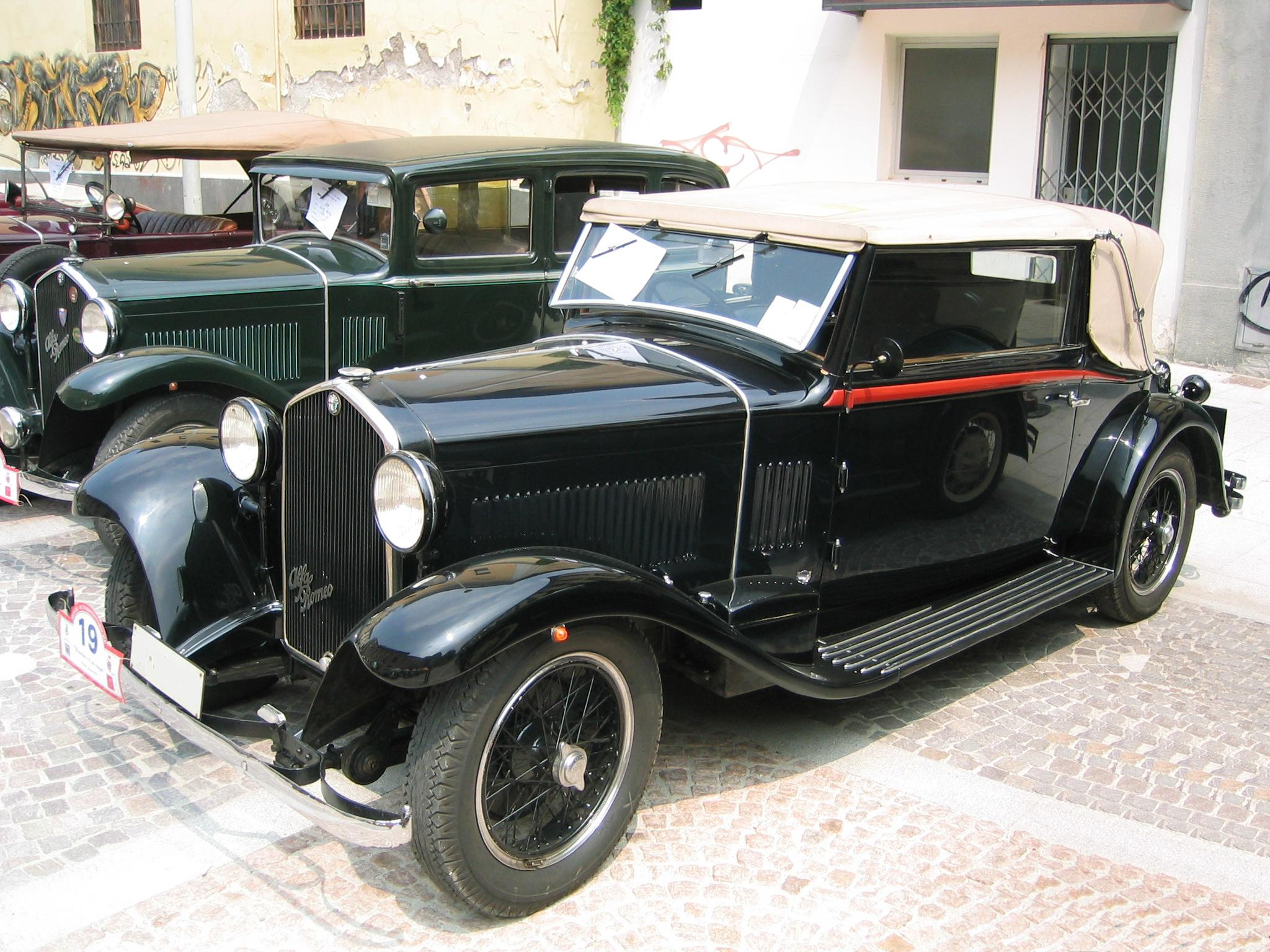
- 6C 1900 Gran Turismo by Castagna

Overview
- Production: 1933

Body and chassis
- Body style: 4-door saloon 2-door cabriolet

Powertrain
- Engine: 1,917 cc DOHC I6
- Transmission: 4-speed manual

Dimensions
- Wheelbase: 2,920 mm (115.0 in)
- Kerb weight: 1,250 kg (2,756 lb) saloon

The Alfa Romeo 6C 1900 was the final derivative of the original 6C 1500, produced in 197 examples during 1933 as a transitional model, before the new 6C 2300 was introduced the following year. Only built in Gran Turismo guise with a 2,920 mm (115.0 in) wheelbase, the 6C 1900 replaced the corresponding 6C 1750 model. Besides the larger displacement, other notable mechanical changes were aluminium cylinder heads, an improved chassis frame and a new transmission. The same upgrades were applied to the 1933 model 6C 1750 Gran Sport which, together with the 6C 1900, form the sixth series of the 6C. Alfa Romeo offered the 6C 1900 with an in-house 4-door saloon body, while bespoke coachbuilt body styles included 4-seater cabriolets.

The double overhead camshaft, naturally aspirated, straight-six engine was bored out from 66 mm (2.6 in) to 68 mm (2.7 in), bringing displacement to 1,917 cc (117.0 cu in). For the first time on a 6C the cylinder head was aluminium; some engines were also manufactured using an aluminium block with pressed-in steel sleeves in place of the usual cast iron block. With 68 hp (50 kW) at 4,500 rpm the 6C 1900 could achieve a top speed of 130 km/h (81 mph). The improved chassis frame consisted of fully boxed rails and crossmembers, instead of the 1750's C-shaped sections. A new four-speed gearbox was fitted, with synchromesh on the two top gears and a freewheel mechanism.

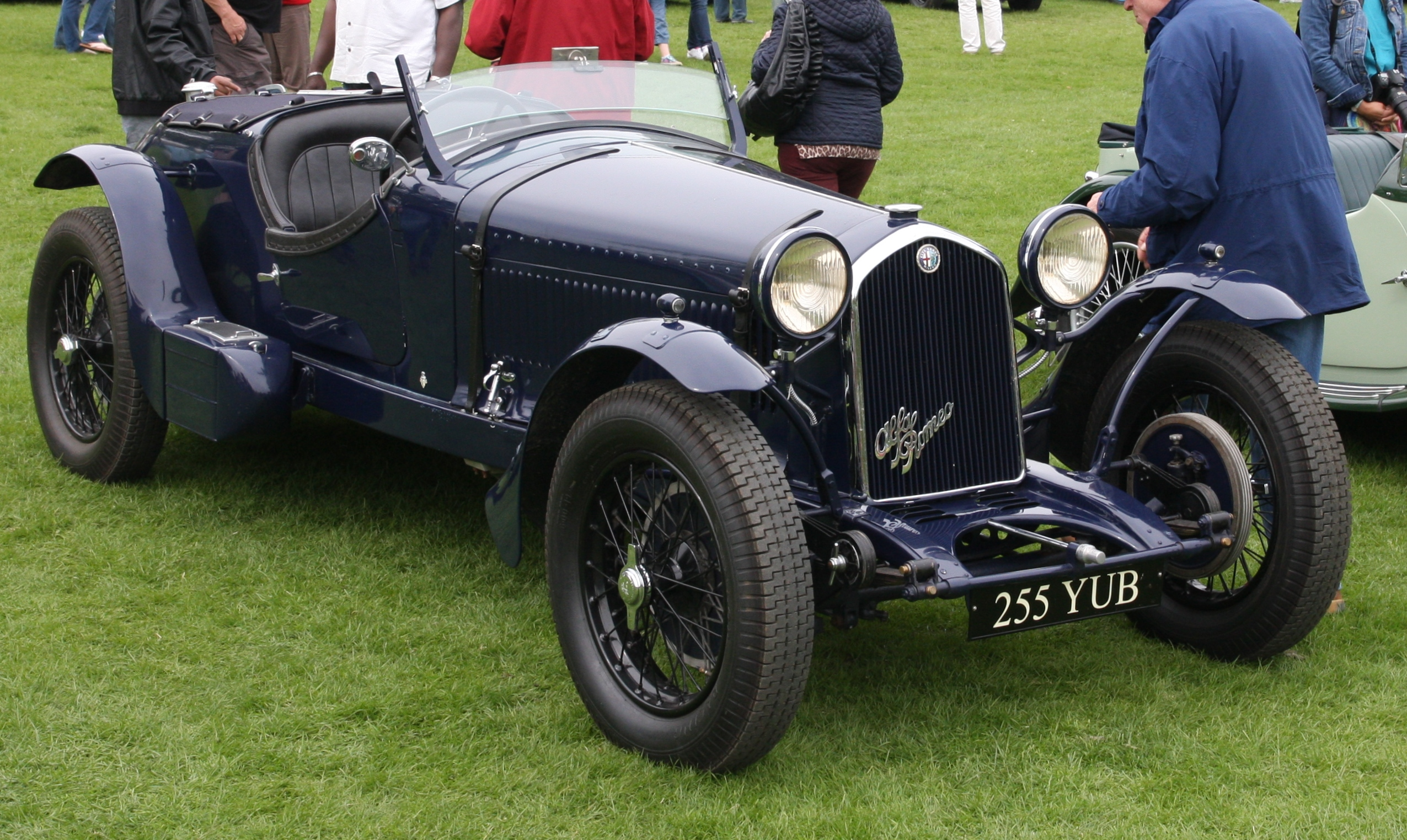
1933 6C 1900 Gran Turismo Touring Superleggera Spider.

=== Specifications ===
| Model | Years | Crankcase/block/head construction | Valvetrain | Compr. ratio | Fuel system | Peak power | Top speed |
|---|---|---|---|---|---|---|---|
| Gran Turismo | 1933 | Alum./iron/alum. | DOHC | 6.25:1 | Single carburettor | 68 hp (50 kW) at 4,500 rpm | 130 km/h (81 mph) |

=== Production ===
Alfa Romeo 6C 1900, production by model
| Model | Gran Turismo | Total |
| Series | VI | VI |
| Prod. years | 1933 | 1933 |
| Prod. number | 197 | 197 |

== 6C 2300 (1934–1938) ==
Alfa Romeo 6C 2300
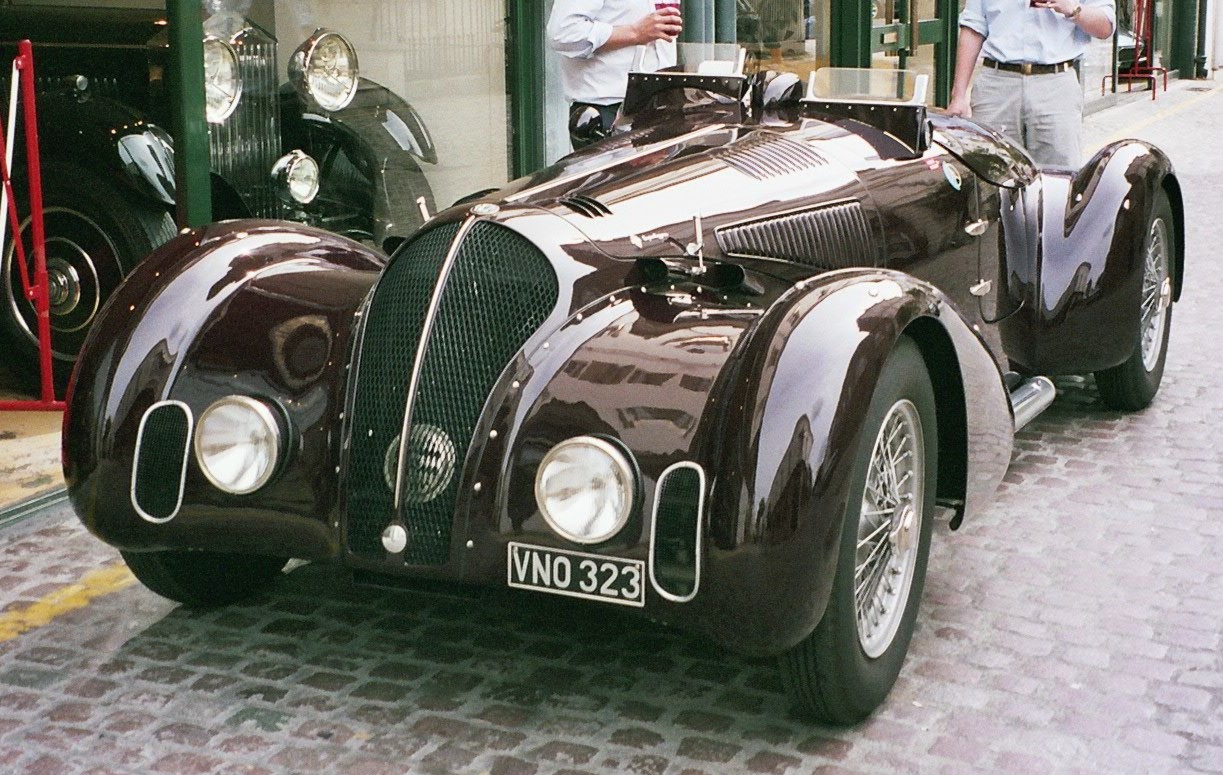
- 1938 6C 2300 B Touring Superleggera Spider

Overview
- Production: 1934–1938

Powertrain
- Engine: 2.3 L 2,309 cc I6

The 6C 2300 (2,309 cc, 70 x 100 mm) was designed by Vittorio Jano as a lower-cost alternative to the 8C. In 1934 Alfa Romeo had become a state-owned enterprise. That year, a new 6C model with a newly designed and larger engine was presented. Chassis technology, however, had been taken from the predecessor. One year later a revised model, the 6C 2300 B, was presented. In this version the engine was placed in a completely redesigned chassis, with independent front suspension and rear swing axle, as well as hydraulic brakes. 760 examples of the rigid-axle 6C 2300 were produced and 870 examples of the B-model.

=== Specifications ===
| Model | Engine | Max power | Fuel system | Top speed | Years | Number produced |
|---|---|---|---|---|---|---|
| 6C 2300 Turismo | 2,309 cc (140.9 cu in) DOHC I6 | 68 bhp (51 kW) at 4,400 rpm | single carburetor | 120 km/h (75 mph) | 1934 | |
| 6C 2300 Gran Turismo | 2,309 cc (140.9 cu in) DOHC I6 | 76 bhp (57 kW) at 4,400 rpm | single carburetor | 130 km/h (81 mph) | 1934 | |
| 6C 2300 B Gran Turismo | 2,309 cc (140.9 cu in) DOHC I6 | 76 bhp (57 kW) at 4,400 rpm | single carburetor | 130 km/h (81 mph) | 1935–1938 | |
| 6C 2300 Pescara | 2,309 cc (140.9 cu in) DOHC I6 | 95 bhp (71 kW) at 4,500 rpm | double carburetor | 145 km/h (90 mph) | 1934 | 60 |
| 6C 2300 B Pescara | 2,309 cc (140.9 cu in) DOHC I6 | 95 bhp (71 kW) at 4,500 rpm | double carburetor | 145 km/h (90 mph) | 1935–1938 | 120 |
| 6C 2300 B Corto/Lungo | 2,309 cc (140.9 cu in) DOHC I6 | - | - | - | 1935 | |
| 6C 2300 B Mille Miglia | 2,309 cc (140.9 cu in) DOHC I6 | - | - | - | | |

| Year | 1934 | 1935 | 1936 | 1937 | 1938 | 1939 | Sum |
|---|---|---|---|---|---|---|---|
| 6C 2300 Tourismo | 199 | 26 | 0 | 0 | 0 | 0 | 225 |
| 6C 2300 Gran Tourismo | 453 | 20 | 0 | 0 | 0 | 0 | 473 |
| 6C 2300 Pescara | 40 | 20 | 0 | 0 | 0 | 0 | 60 |
| 6C 2300 B Gran Tourismo | 0 | 16 | 0 | 70 | 0 | 0 | 86 |
| 6C 2300 B Pescara | 0 | 3 | 5 | 112 | 0 | 0 | 120 |
| 6C 2300 B Torismo | 0 | 0 | 0 | 78 | 0 | 0 | 78 |
| 6C 2300 Mille Miglia | 0 | 0 | 0 | 0 | 107 | 0 | 107 |
| 6C 2300 B lungo | 0 | 0 | 0 | 0 | 217 | 29 | 246 |
| 6C 2300 B corto | 0 | 0 | 0 | 0 | 198 | 13 | 211 |
| Sum | 692 | 85 | 5 | 260 | 522 | 42 | 1,606 |
corto et lungo = short and long

=== Gallery of models ===
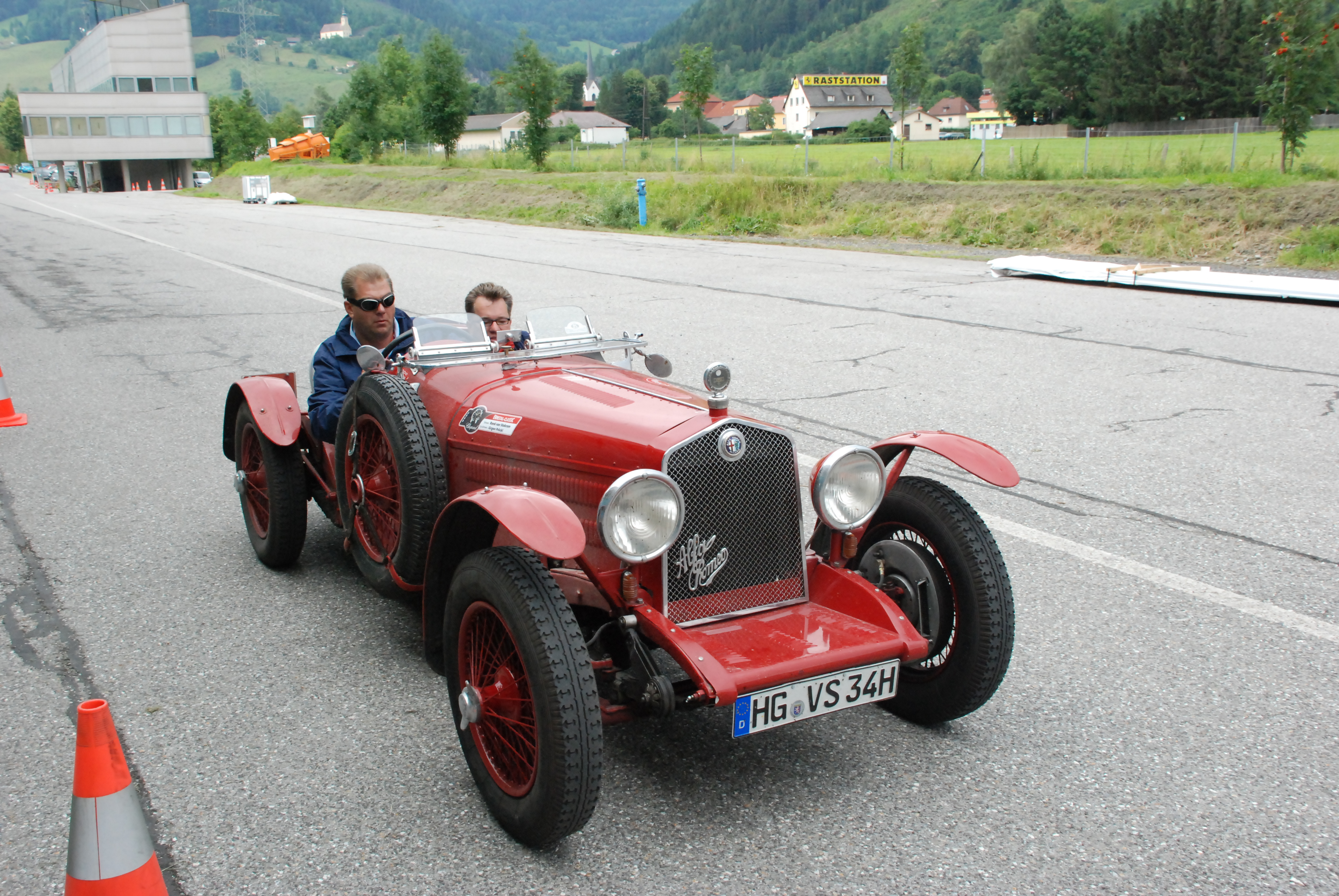
1934 6C 2300 Pescara

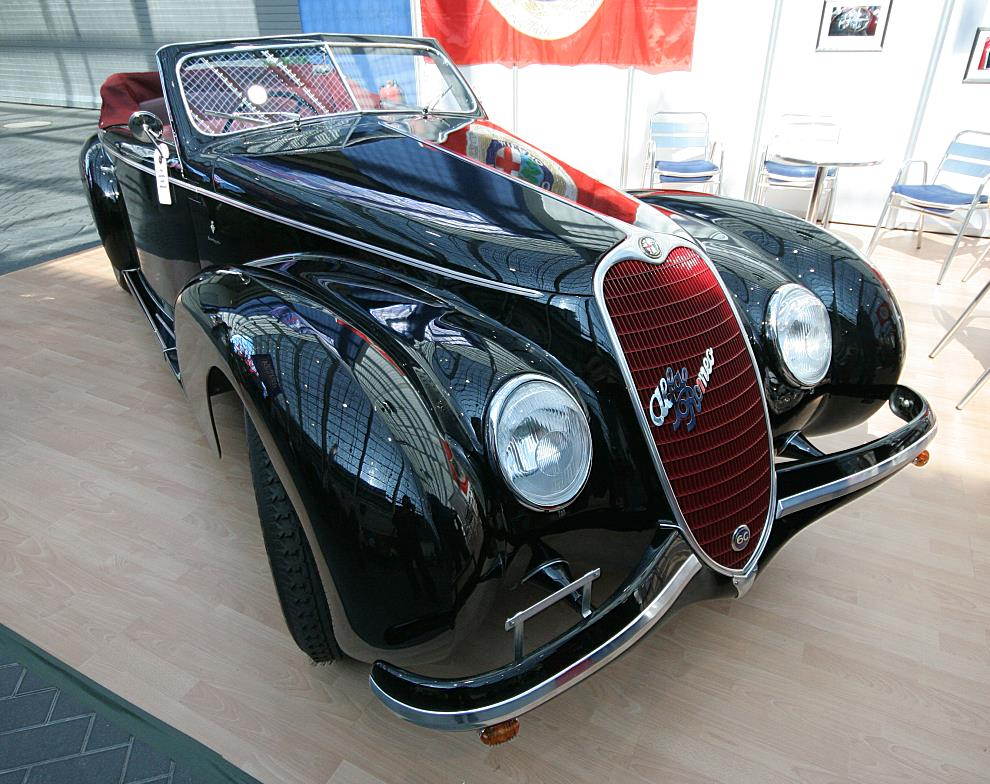
6C 2300 Touring Superleggera Spider

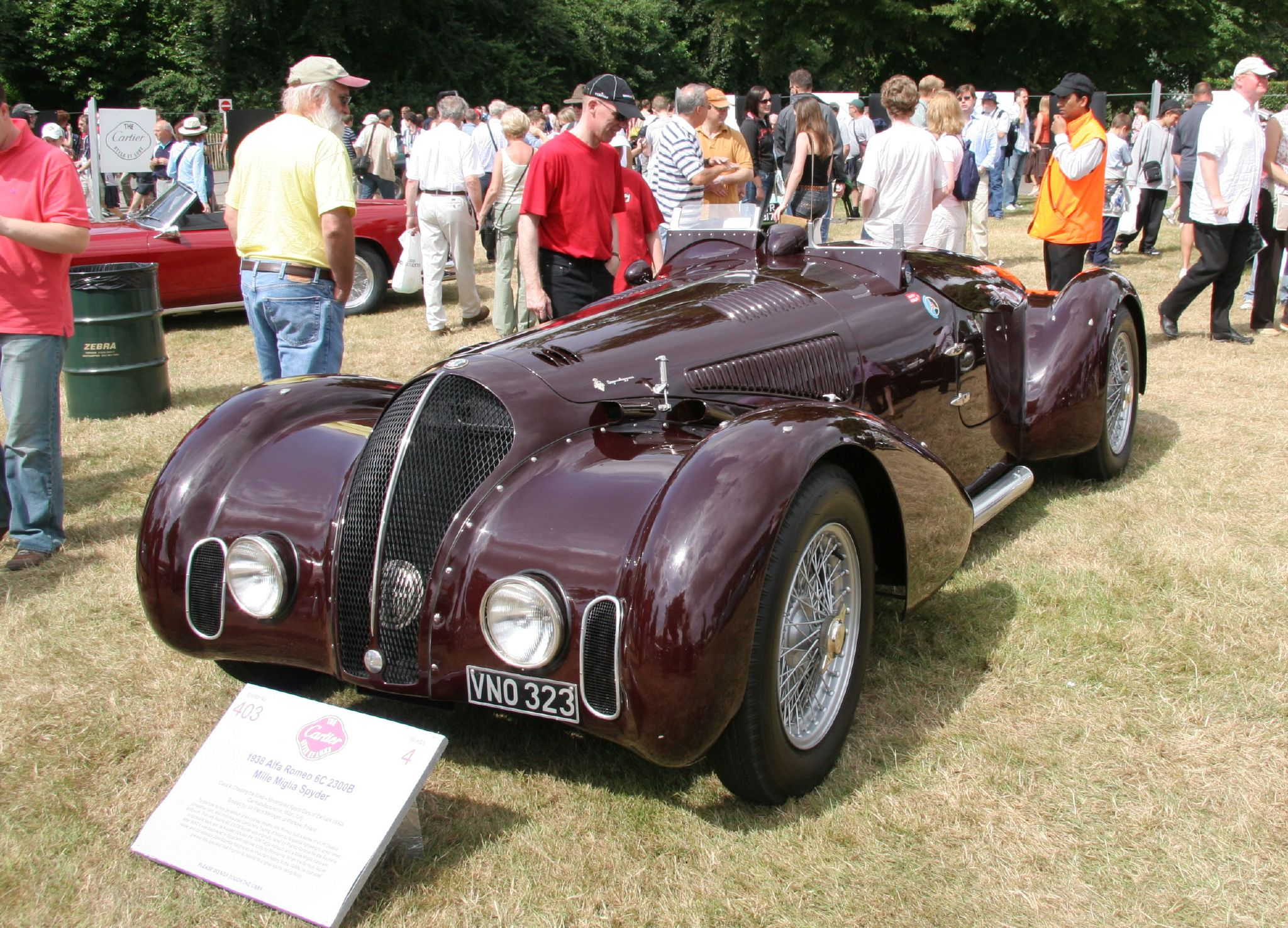
1938 6C 2300 B Mille Miglia Spider

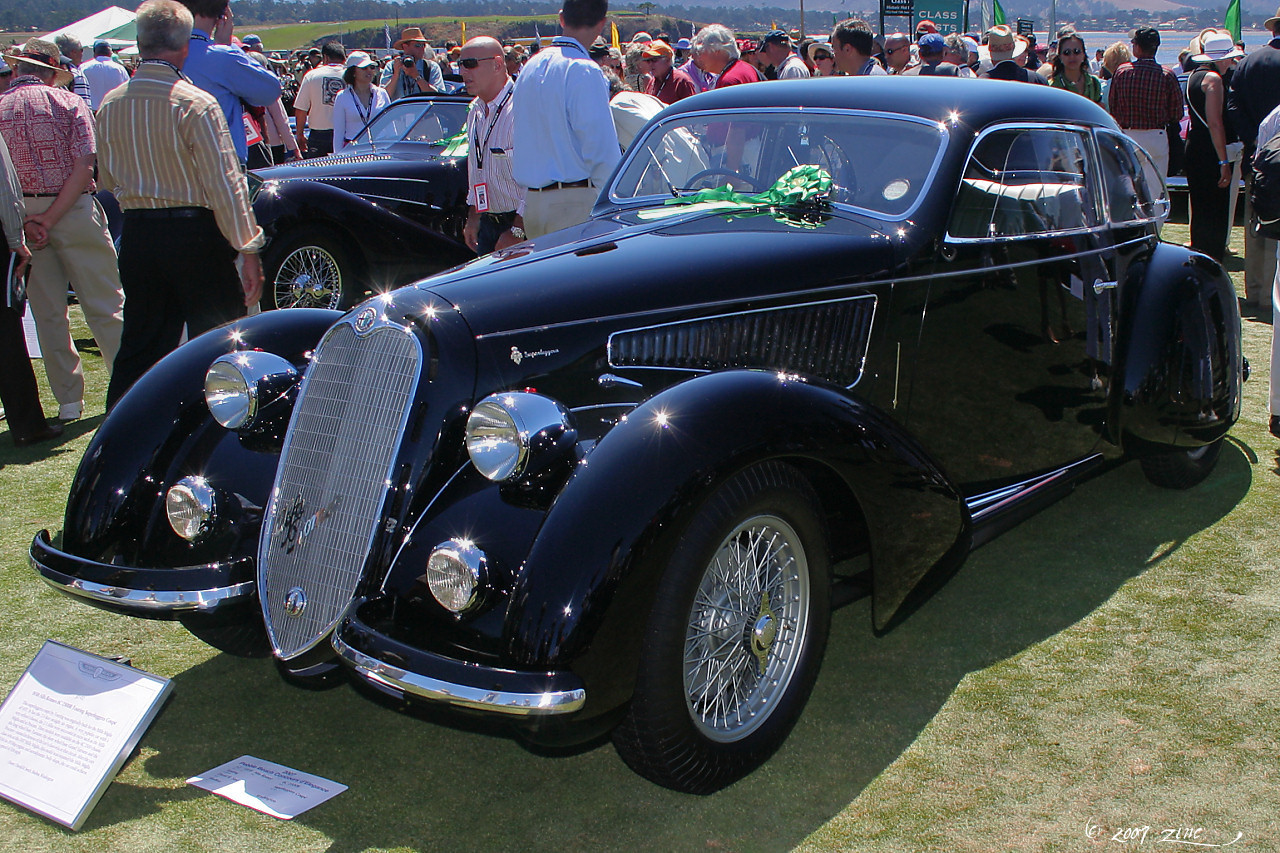
1938 6C 2300 B Touring Superleggera Berlinetta

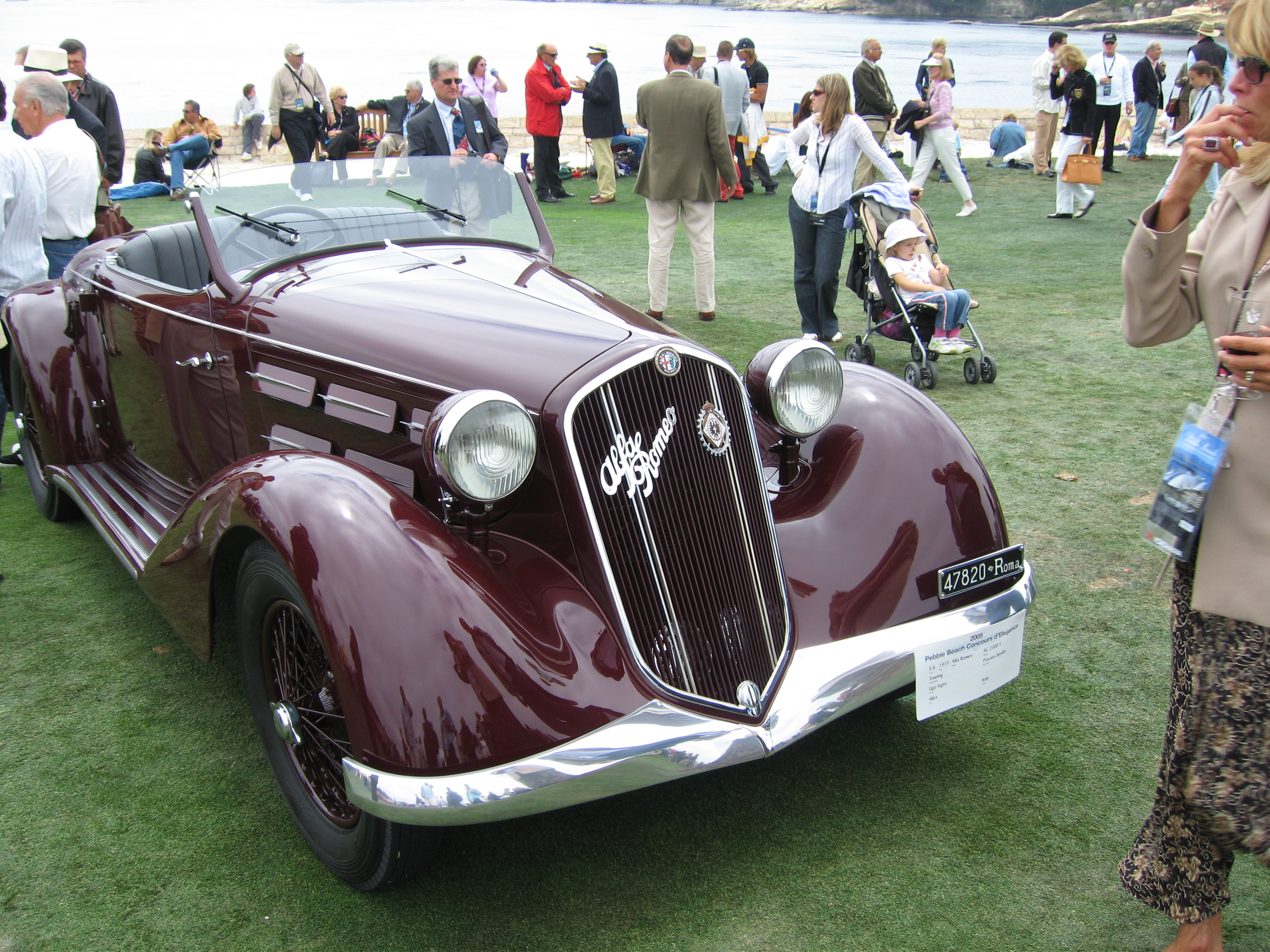
1935 6C 2300 Sport Touring Superleggera Pescara Spider. Mille Miglia 1936 entrant and ex Benito Mussolini car

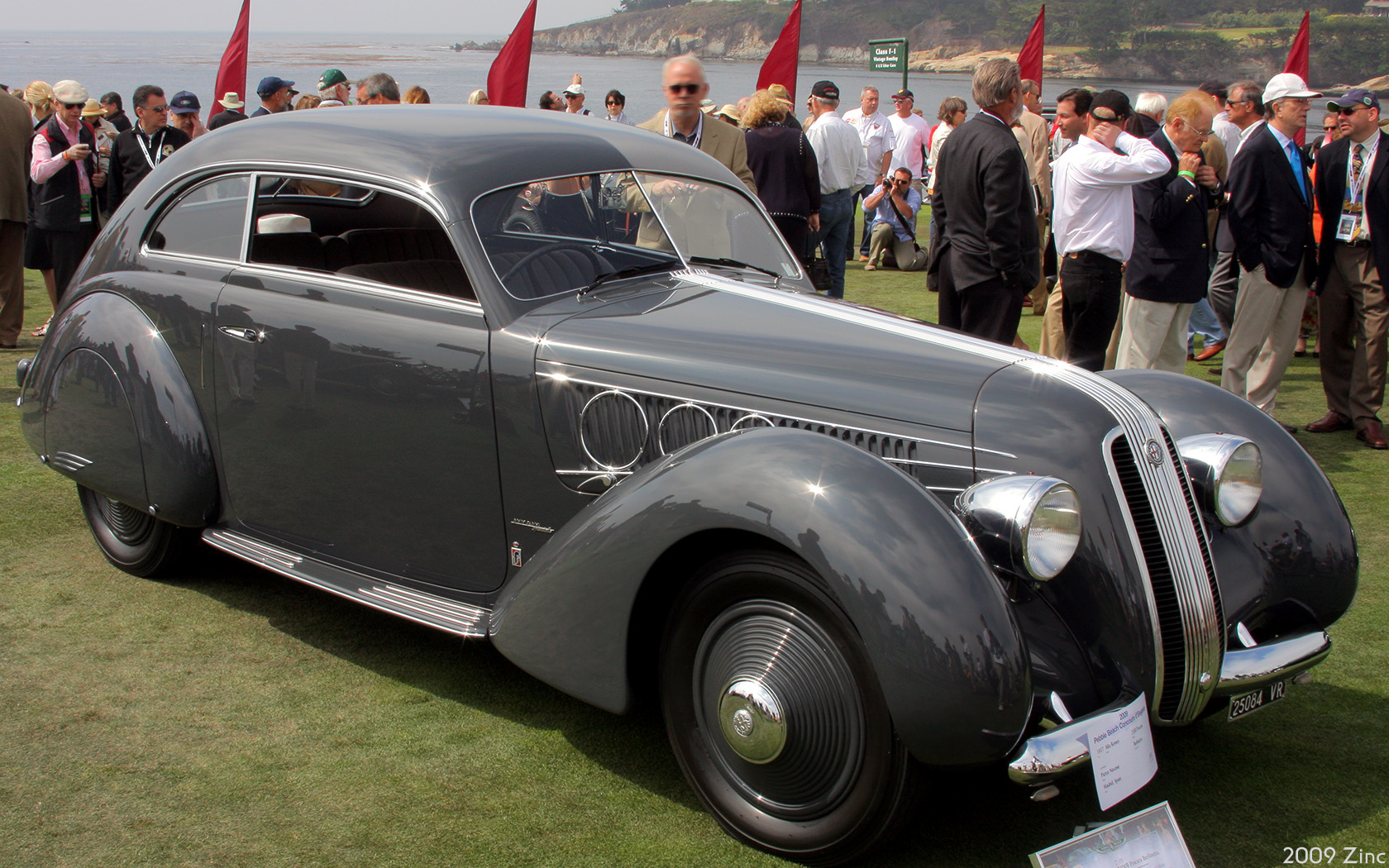
1937 6C 2300 B Pescara

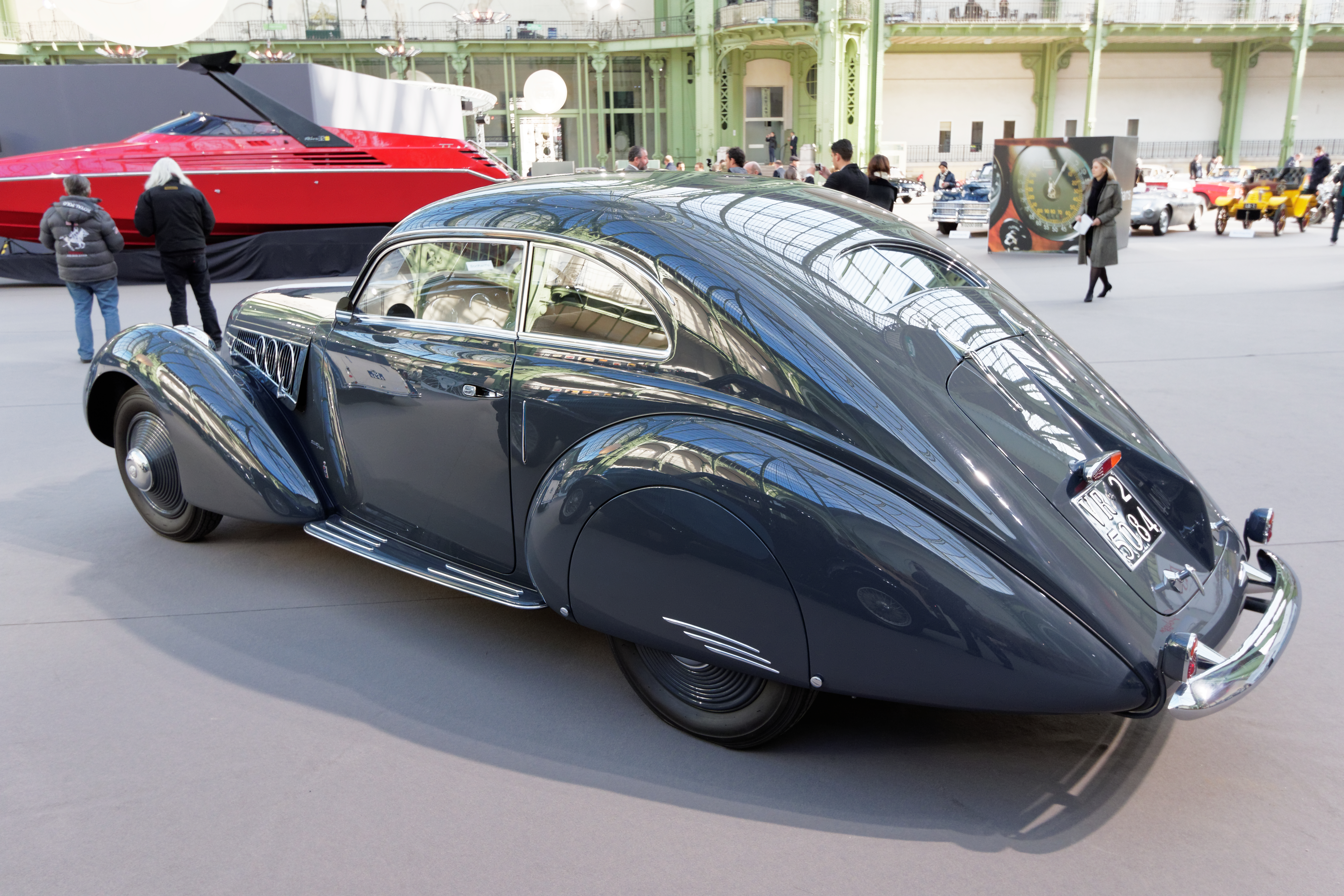
1937 6C 2300 B Pescara Pinin Farina Berlinetta

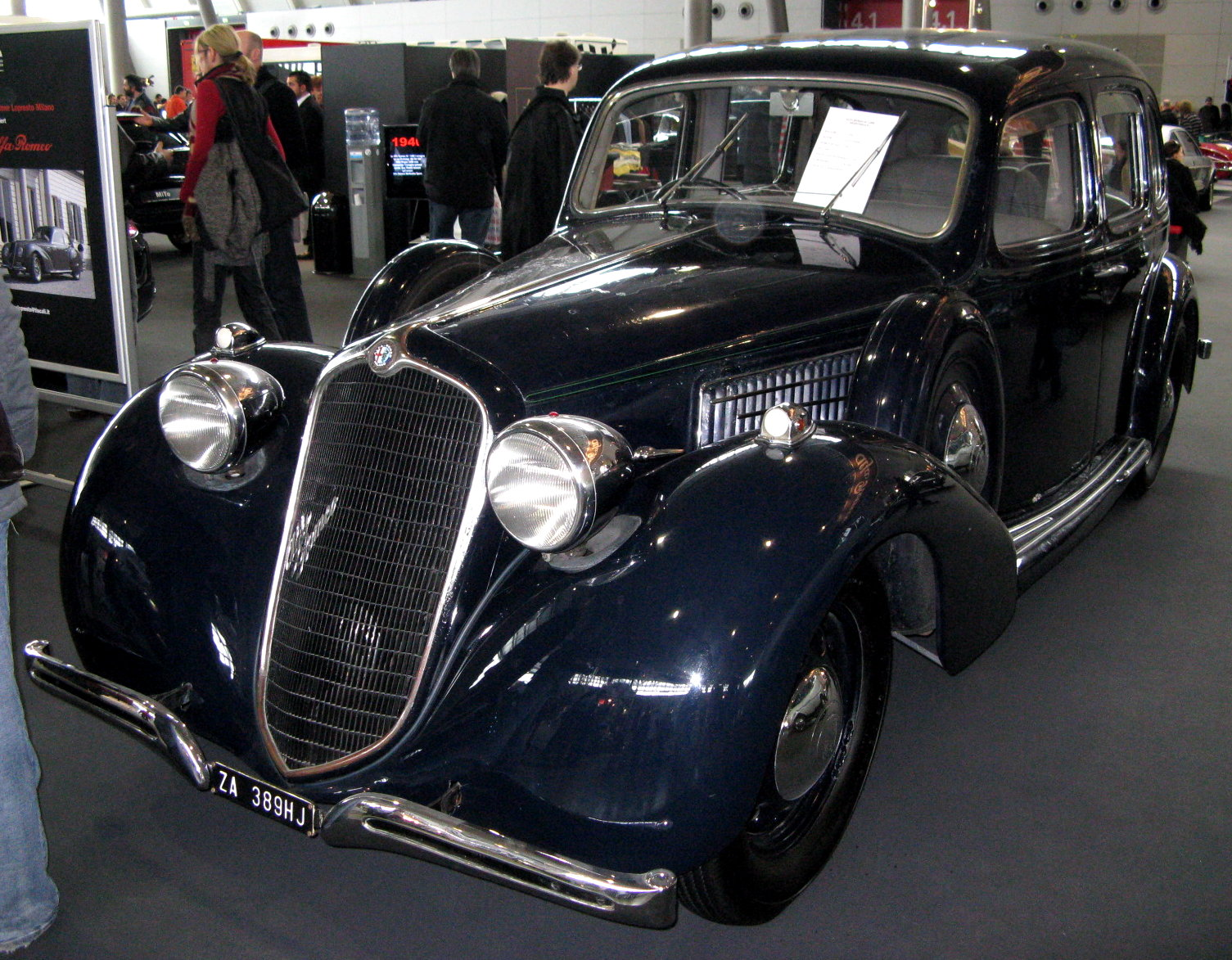
1938 6C 2300 B Ministeriale

=== Aerodinamica Spider ===
Alfa Romeo Aerodinamica Spider
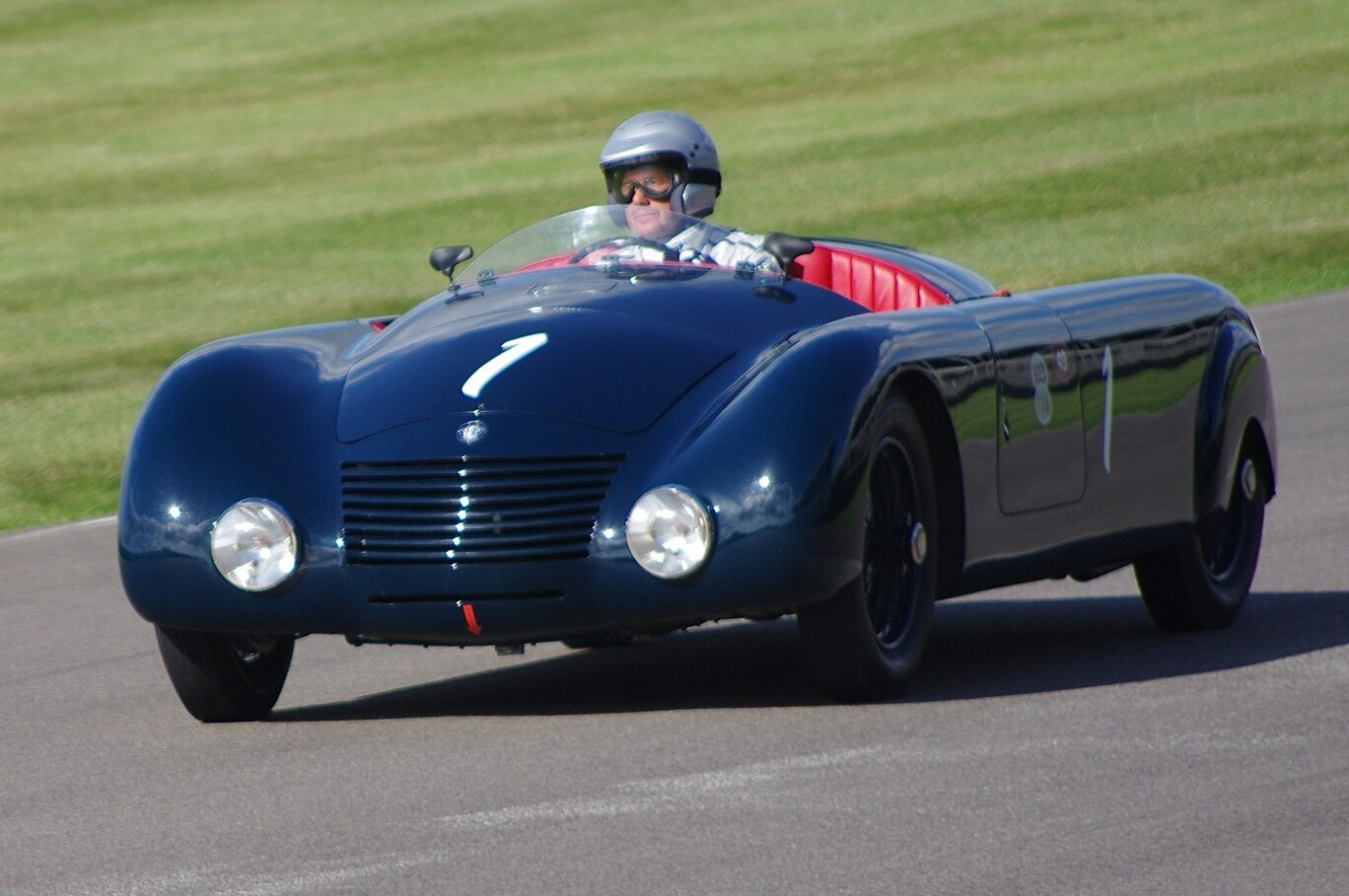
- The Aerodinamica Spider at the 2012 Goodwood Revival

Dimensions
- Wheelbase: 2,800 mm (110.2 in)
- Length: 4,750 mm (187.0 in)
- Width: 1,720 mm (67.7 in)
- Height: 1,030 mm (40.6 in)
- Kerb weight: 950 kg (2,094 lb) (dry)

The Alfa Romeo Aerodinamica Spider was a one-off mid-engine streamlined prototype, built by brothers Gino and Oscar Jankovitz in connection with Alfa Romeo between 1935 and 1937 in Fiume (today Rijeka), and should have been powered by an Alfa Romeo 12-cylinder engine. The construction of the car took many years, while technical changes had to be made due to the testing period from 1936 to 1937. The Aero. spider represents:

- The first “modern” mid-engined sports car design.
- The first mid-engined car with central driving position (albeit Lancia deposited a patent for a centrally driven design in 1934).
- The first car designed to take account of newly developed principles of aerodynamics, to provide low drag both externally and internally.
- The first car which was designed for high speeds, by using a body which fully enveloped the underside of the car to reduce air turbulence beneath it and an aerodynamic front design to reduce front lift of the car

==== History ====
Between 1935 and 1937 the Jankovits carried out the construction; a "rolling chassis" could be registered in Fiume (number plate: 2757 FM) tested, and subsequently modified.

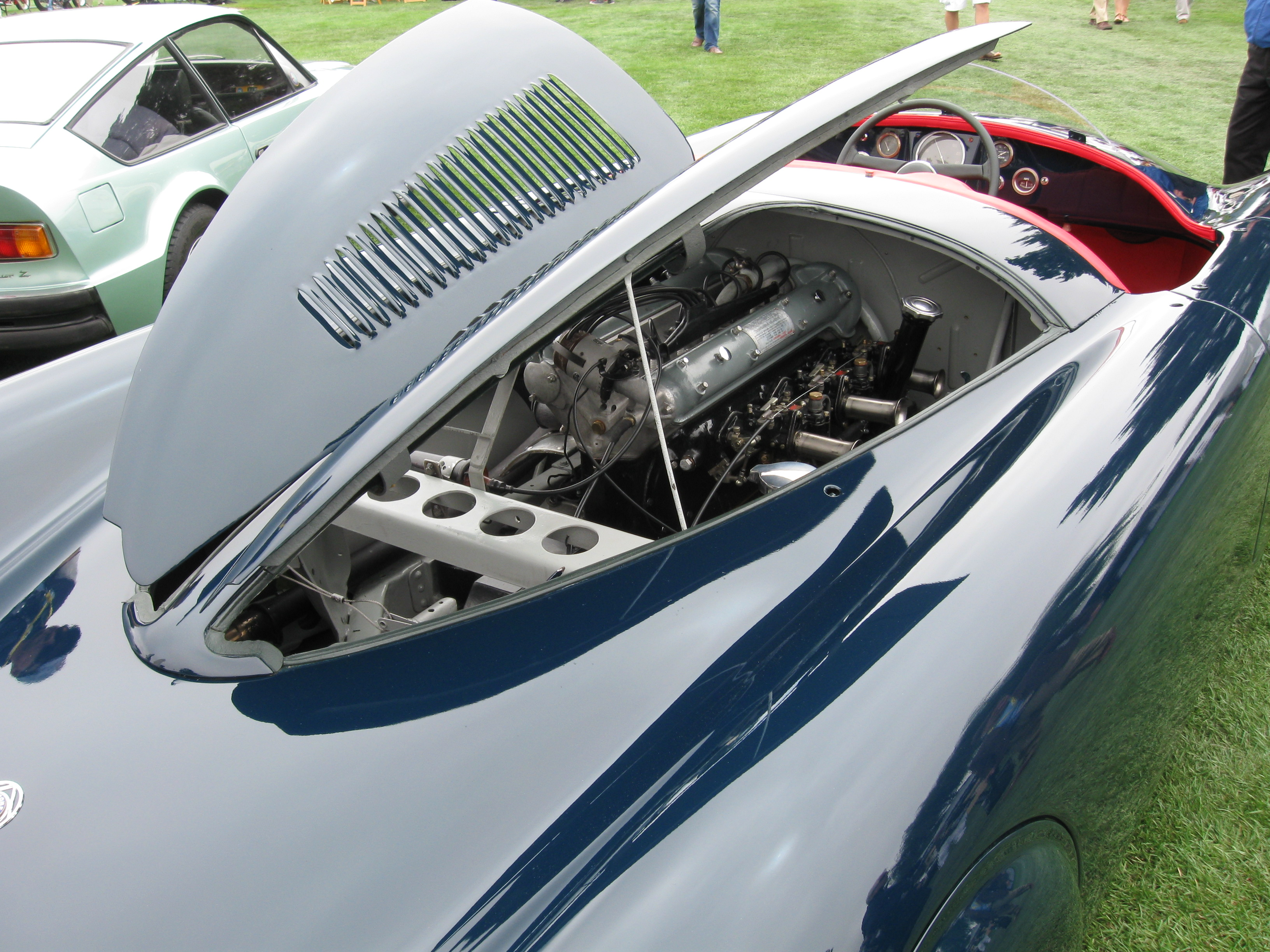
The engine compartment of the Alfa Aerodinamica Spider

The No.700316 6C 2300 Tipo Turismo straight-six engine placed behind the driver was Alfa Romeo: 2,309 cc, iron block, light alloy head, chain-driven dual overhead camshafts, spur gears, wet sump lubrication. The Jankovits fitted exhaust pipes of equal length and improved intake of air to reduce the pressure drop. Later the engine was upgraded with three dual Weber 36 D 04 carburettors, a configuration used on the 6C 2500 SS of 1939. The transmission was the 4-speed gearbox from the 6C 2300, mounted with a Hardy disc behind the engine originally fitted, which they removed. A differential unit from a Lancia Lambda was later fitted instead. A unique pre-selector gear change system was also developed. The clutch was hydraulically assisted.

The ladder chassis was made by Alfa Romeo for the central-mounted engine, with straight rails from front to the rear end of the car; it was numbered 700316 in accordance with the engine number. The final suspension was all-independent, with "silent bloc" bushes; at the front it consisted of double wishbones, with a thick sheet steel (4 mm) upper wishbone, lever-arm Houdaille shock absorber hydraulic dampers, longitudinal torsion bars, and lower location through a transverse leaf spring; at the rear it had swing axles and radius arms, with a transverse leaf spring and longitudinal torsion bars.

Steering was worm and sector with Hardy disc. Brakes used a two-circuit hydraulic system (two fluid distributors and two master cylinders, one for the front and one for the rear), Lockheed-type duplex brakes with 17-by-2-inch (432 mm × 51 mm) drums all round. An equaliser was fitted, which could avoid overbraking by changing the distribution of braking force between the front and rear brakes during driving. 5.50–18 racing crossply tyres were mounted on Alfa Romeo 18-inch Rudge-type wire wheels.

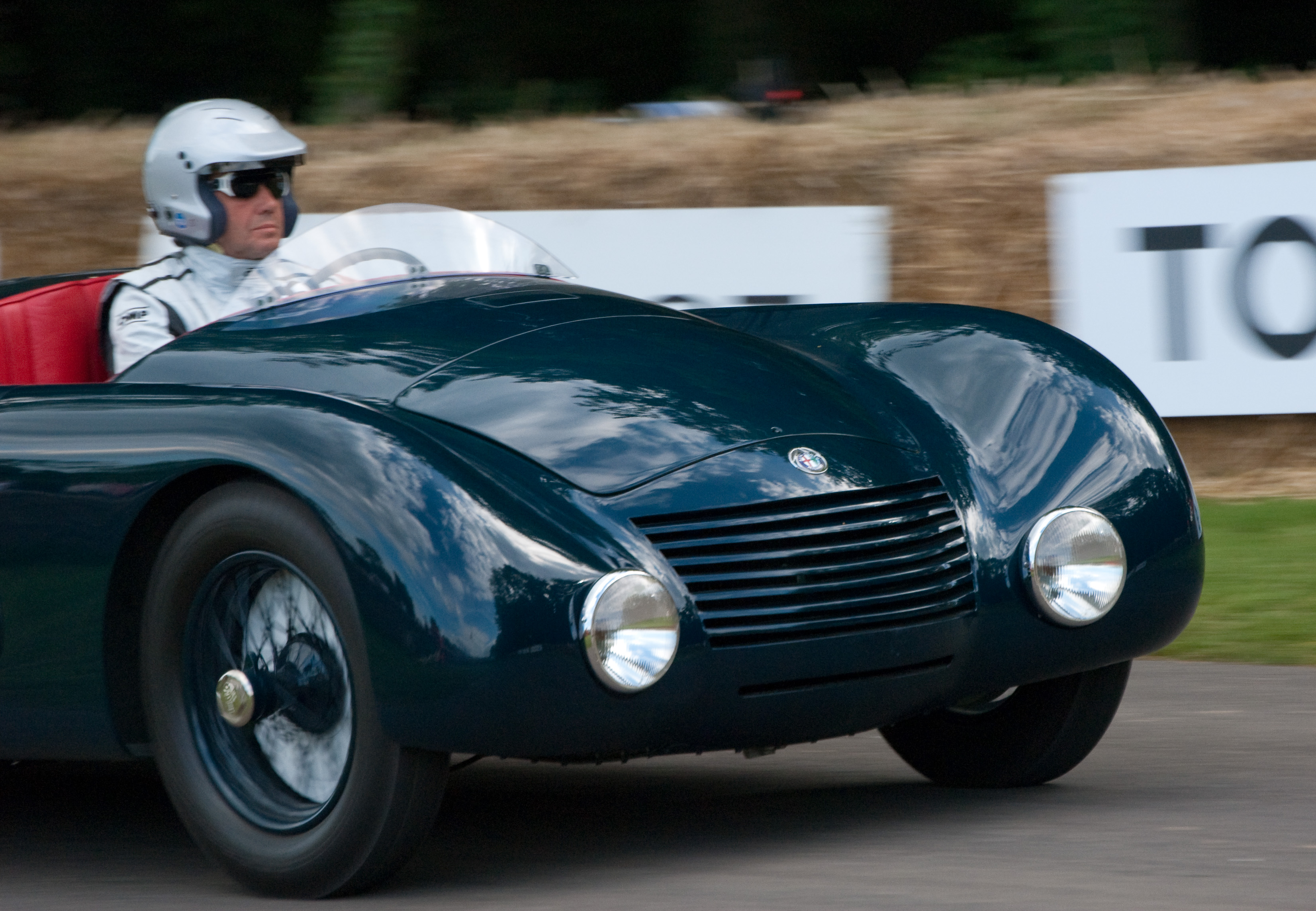
The Aerodinamica Spider at the 2011 Goodwood Festival of Speed

The aerodynamic shape of the car was designed by Oscar Jankovits, probably inspired by contemporary aerodynamic theories such as Paul Jaray's, and built at the Jankovits' garage between 1935 and 1937. It was a barchetta with central driving position and fully integrated wings (pontoon styling). The bodyshell was streamlined to minimise turbulence in the air flow, fully enveloping the underbody and integrating door handles and lights. A horizontally mounted radiator made it possible to design an exceptionally low front profile for a pre-war car. Air inlets were positioned in zones of high air pressure, and hot air outlets from the engine and brakes in areas of low pressure. Top speed was in excess of 140 mph (225 km/h).

During the Second World War the completed prototype remained hidden in the Jankovits' garage in Fiume. After the war the Jankovits, in need of money, had to sell their car to an Anglo-American officer. On Christmas Eve 1946, with a temporary registration document, Gino Jankovits drove the Aerodinamica Spider through the closed border into Italy causing a border shootout. Then the Alfa disappeared for about 30 years until it was rediscovered in England. In 1978, well-known Alfa Romeo historian Luigi Fusi put the then-owner of the car in contact with the Jankovits, and tried to buy the car for the Alfa museum. The acquisition failed, but the prototype had been painted blue, and then green as this was the original colour. The car still has its original licence plate and registration documents.

== 6C 2500 (1938–1952) ==
Alfa Romeo 6C 2500
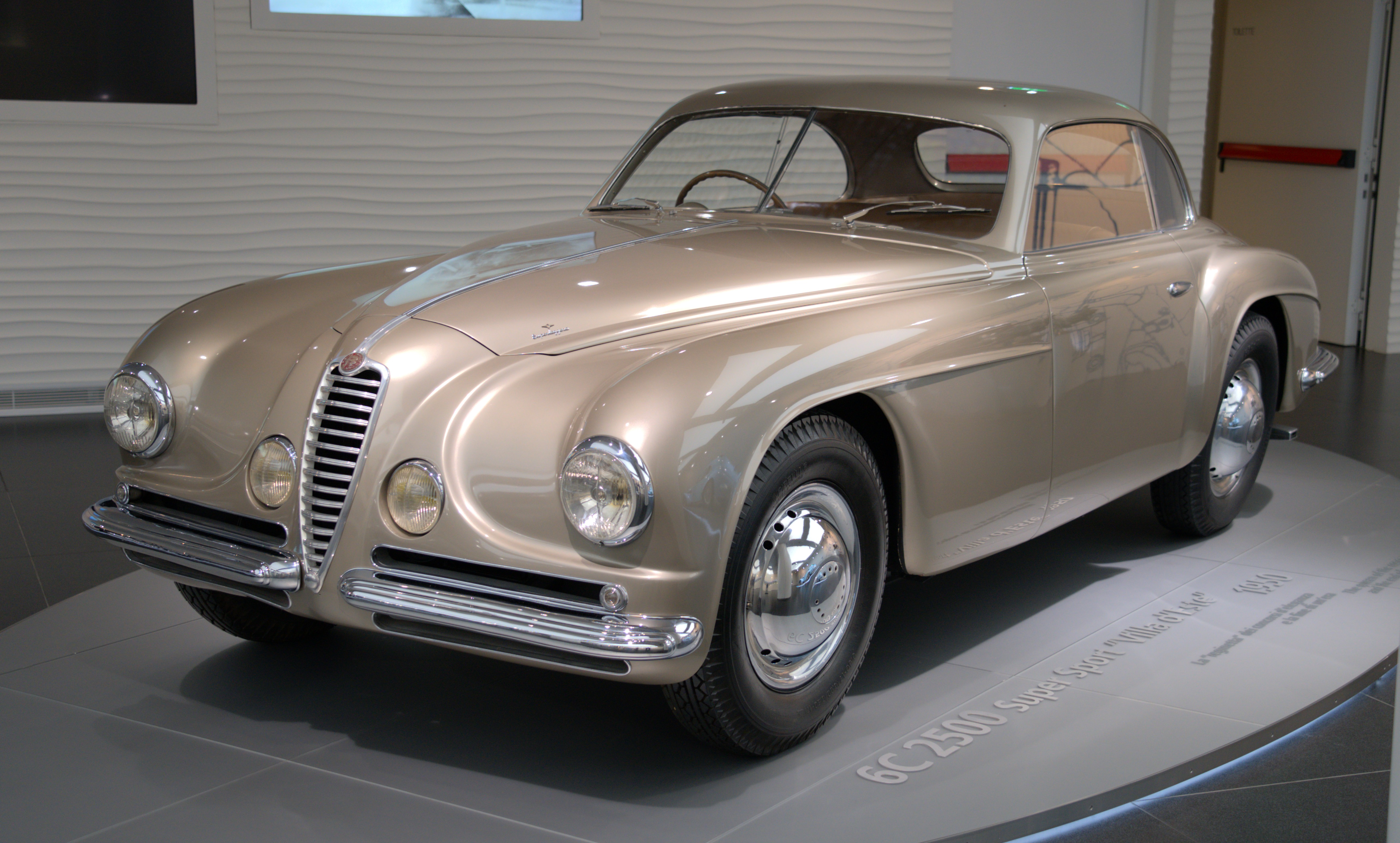
- 6C 2500 Villa d'Este

Overview
- Production: 1938–1952

Powertrain
- Engine: 2.5 L 2,443 cc I6
- Transmission: 4-speed manual

Dimensions
- Wheelbase: 3,250 mm (128.0 in) (Turismo); 3,000 mm (118.1 in) (Sport); 2,700 mm (106.3 in) (Super Sport)

Chronology
- Successor: Alfa Romeo 1900

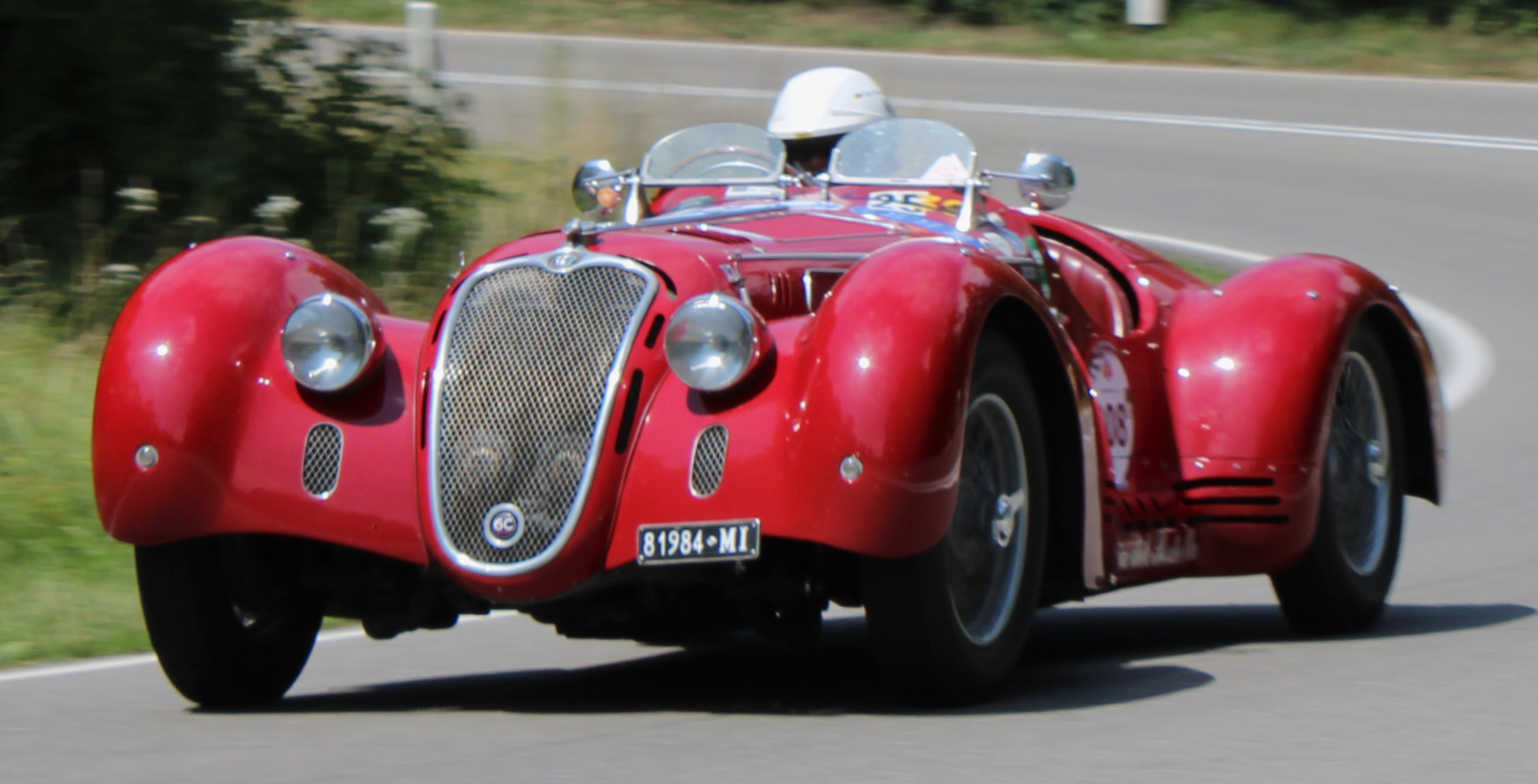
Alfa Romeo 6C 2500 Super Sport Spider Corsa

Introduced in 1938, the 2500 (2,443 cc) was the final 6C road car. World War II was coming and car development was stopped, but a few hundred 6C 2500s were built from 1940 to 1945. Postwar, the first new Alfa model was the 1946 6C 2500 Freccia d'Oro (Golden Arrow), of which 680 were built until late 1951, with bodies by Alfa. The 2500 had an enlarged engine compared to the predecessor model; this Vittorio Jano designed dual overhead cam engine was available with either one or three Weber carburetors. The triple carburetor version was used in the top-of-the-range SS (Super Sport) version. The 2,443 cc straight-six engine was bored out from 70 mm (2.8 in) to 72 mm (2.8 in) and was mounted onto a steel ladder frame chassis, which was offered with three wheelbases: 3,250 mm (128.0 in) on the Turismo, 3,000 mm (118.1 in) on the Sport and 2,700 mm (106.3 in) on the Super Sport. Various coachbuilders built their own bodied versions of the 2500, but most bodywork was built by Touring Superleggera of Milan.

The Tipo 256 was a racing version of 2500 made in eight examples between 1939 and 1940 for the Mille Miglia and the Le Mans 24 Hours. It was made in Spider (convertible) and Berlinetta (coupe) Touring bodystyles. With a power of 125 bhp (93 kW) it could achieve a top speed of 200 kilometres per hour (120 mph).

The car was sold to wealthy customers like King Farouk, Alì Khan, Rita Hayworth, Tyrone Power, and Prince Rainier. One was also featured in The Godfather in 1972.

The 2500 was one of the most expensive cars available in its time. The final 6C was built in 1952 and the model was replaced by the 1900.

All 6C 2500 vehicles are catalogued, together with chassis specifications, known fate, technical and race data and first owners, in the Editoriale Domus book Alfa Romeo 6C 2500 (written by Angelo Tito Anselmi).

=== Specifications ===
| Model | Engine | Max power | Fuel system | Top speed | Years | Number produced |
|---|---|---|---|---|---|---|
| 6C 2500 Coloniale | 2,443 cc (149.1 cu in) DOHC I6 | 90 bhp (67 kW) at 4,500 rpm | single carburetor | 127 km/h (79 mph) | 1939–1942 | 152 |
| 6C 2500 | 2,443 cc (149.1 cu in) DOHC I6 | 90 bhp (67 kW) at 4,600 rpm | single carburetor | - | 1938–1949 | |
| 6C 2500 Turismo | 2,443 cc (149.1 cu in) DOHC I6 | 87 hp (65 kW) | single carburetor | - | 1935–1937 | |
| 6C 2500 Sport | 2,443 cc (149.1 cu in) DOHC I6 | 95 bhp (71 kW) at 4,600 rpm (1939–1946); 90 bhp (67 kW) (1947–1952) | single carburetor | 155 km/h (96 mph) | 1939–1952 | 13 |
| 6C 2500 Super Sport | 2,443 cc (149.1 cu in) DOHC I6 | 110 bhp (82 kW) at 4,800 rpm | double carburetor | 170 km/h (106 mph) (1939–1946); 165 km/h (103 mph) (1947–1951) | 1939–1951 | 413 Coupés |
| 6C 2500 Super Sport Spyder Corsa | 2,443 cc (149.1 cu in) DOHC I6 | 120 bhp (89 kW) at 4,750 rpm | triple carburetor | - | 1939–1940 | 8 |
| 6C 2500 Sport Pinin Farina | 2,443 cc (149.1 cu in) DOHC I6 | 95 bhp (71 kW) at 4,600 rpm | single carburetor | 155 km/h (96 mph) | 1941–1943 | 8 |
| 6C 2500 Freccia d'Oro | 2,443 cc (149.1 cu in) DOHC I6 | 90 bhp (67 kW) at 4,600 rpm | single carburetor | 155 km/h (96 mph) | 1946–1951 | 680 |
| 6C 2500 Villa d'Este | 2,443 cc (149.1 cu in) DOHC I6 | 110 bhp (82 kW) at 4,800 rpm | triple carburetor | - | 1949–1952 | 36 |
| 6C 2500 Gran Turismo | 2,443 cc (149.1 cu in) DOHC I6 | 110 bhp (82 kW) at 4,800 rpm | triple carburetor | 170 km/h (106 mph) | 1950–1953 | |
| 6C 2500 Competizione | 2,443 cc (149.1 cu in) DOHC I6 | 145 bhp (108 kW) at 5,500 rpm | triple carburetor | 200 km/h (124 mph) | 1948 | 3 |

=== 6C 2500 Freccia d'Oro ===
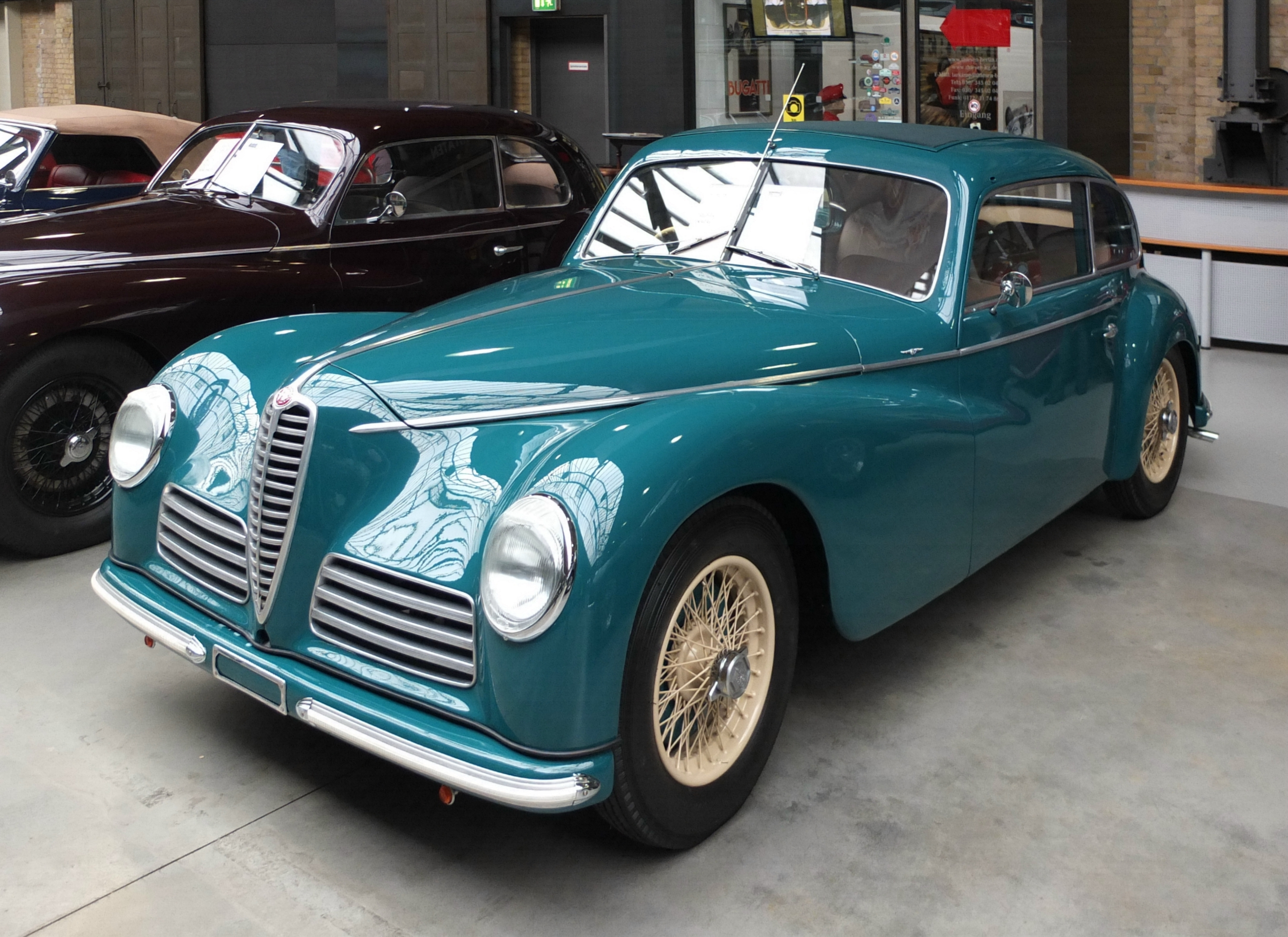
1949 Alfa Romeo 6C 2500 Sport "Freccia d'Oro"

The 6C 2500 Freccia d'Oro (Golden Arrow) was the first postwar Alfa Romeo. 680 were built until 1951, with bodies by Alfa. The car was a Berlina bodystyle with 5–6 seats based on the 2500 Sport. It has a wheelbase of 3,000 millimetres (120 in) and it weighs 1,550 kilograms (3,420 lb). With a 4-speed manual gearbox this 90 bhp (67 kW) car could achieve a top speed of 155 kilometres per hour (96 mph).

=== 6C 2500 Villa d'Este ===
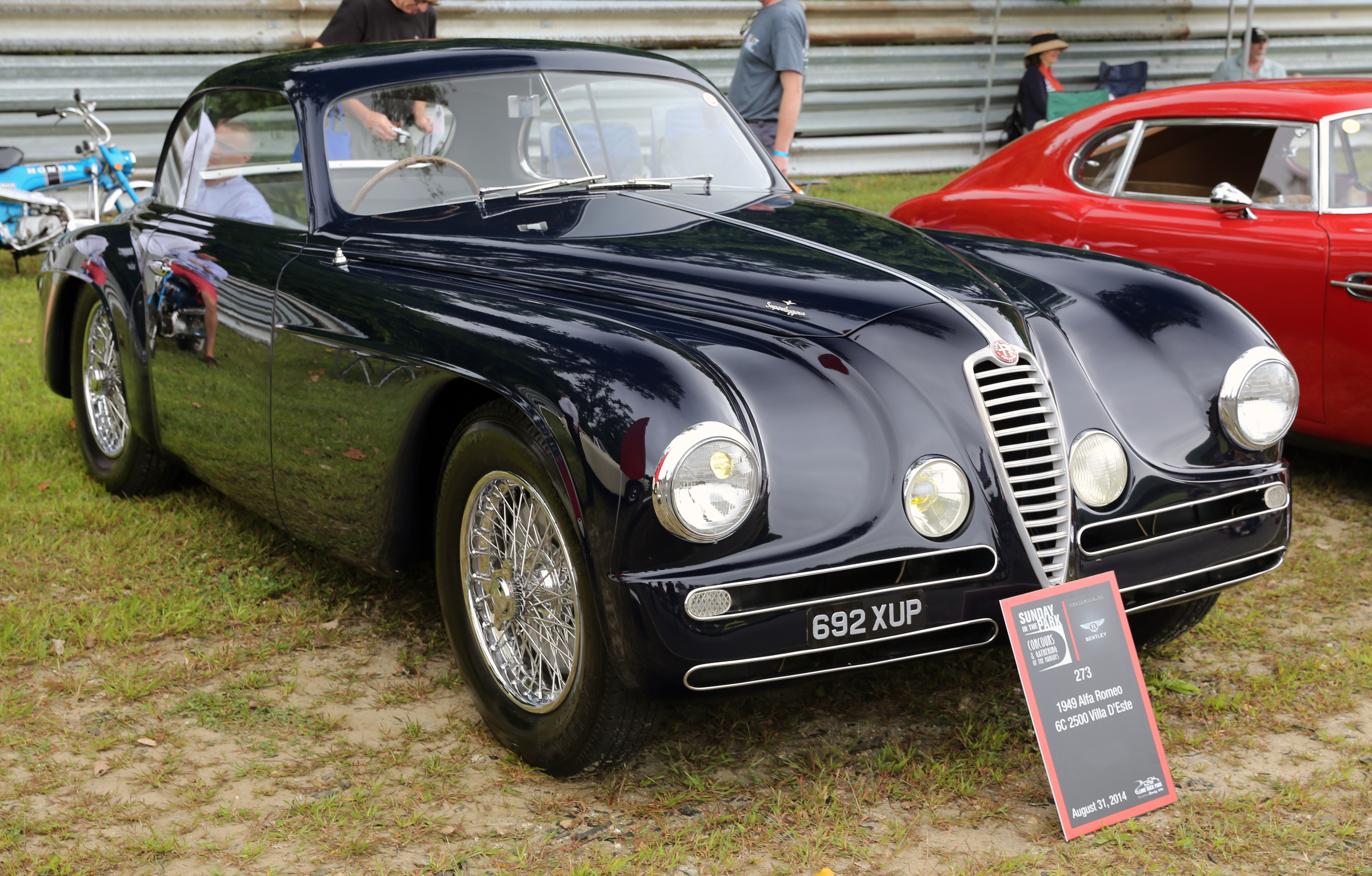
1949 Alfa Romeo 6C 2500 Super Sport Villa d'Este (Touring Superleggera) at the 2014 Lime Rock Concours d'Élegance.

The 6C 2500 Villa d'Este was introduced in 1949 as a Berlinetta with coachwork by Touring Superleggera of Milan. The Villa d'Este used the 6C 2500 Super Sport chassis with a 110 bhp six-cylinder, 2,443 cc engine. Alfa Romeo chose the name 'Villa d’Este' after this design won the Concorso d’Eleganza, which was held at the historic resort on Lake Como in northern Italy. The 'Villa d'Este' was Alfa's last handbuilt model, with only 36 examples being built (including 5 cabriolets). 6C 2500 production ended in 1952 (although a couple of racing examples were produced in 1953).

=== 6C 2500 Coloniale ===
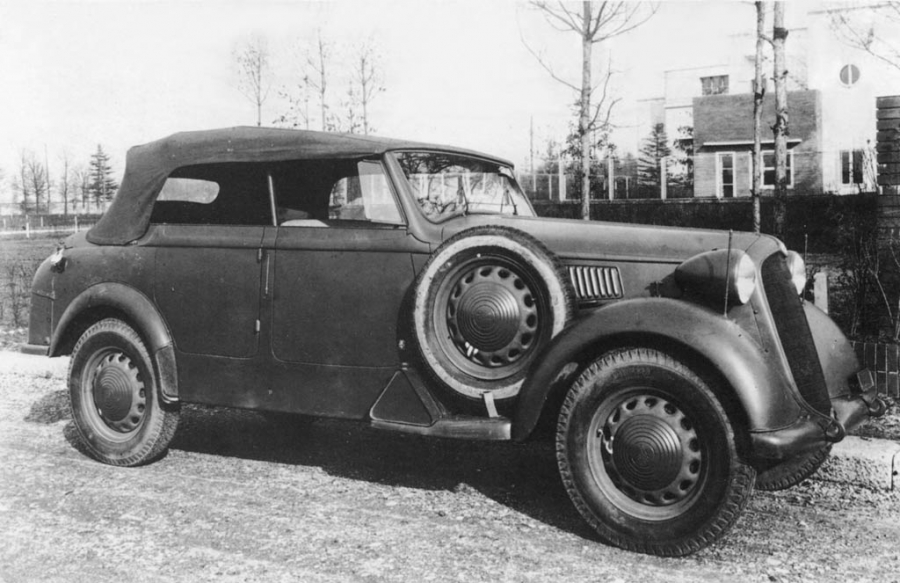
Alfa Romeo 6C 2500 Coloniale

The 6C 2500 Coloniale was a staff car version of the third series 6C 2500. It was commissioned in 1938 by the Italian Ministry of Defence, for military use in the Italian colonies. Two prototypes of the 6C 2500 Coloniale were manufactured in 1939. One was shipped to Italian East Africa, where Giambattista Guidotti, winner of the 1937 Mille Miglia driving an Alfa Romeo 8C 2300 B, was instructed to conduct testing in the harsh operational conditions. The car was the first to be manufactured using technology developed by the renowned Carrozzeria Touring, the Superleggera. The car had two spare wheels, a fuel tank of 120 litres and four additional reserve tanks with a capacity of 70 litres of gasoline. In addition there was a locking differential, engaged from the dashboard by the driver. Regular production began in 1941 and the first batch of 150 vehicles was delivered between 1941 and 1942; production was then halted due to war events Total production amounted to 150 series cars plus two prototypes.

=== 6C 2500 Sport Pinin Farina ===
The 6C 2500 Pinin Farina was manufactured during the Second World War until 1943, when Alfa Romeo manufacture was switched to the technical needs of the army. The vehicles of the 1943 build series had only their chassis and the transmission assembled on the factory production line; the bodywork and interior build being undertaken by the Italian design studio Pinin Farina.

=== Gallery of 6C 2500 models ===
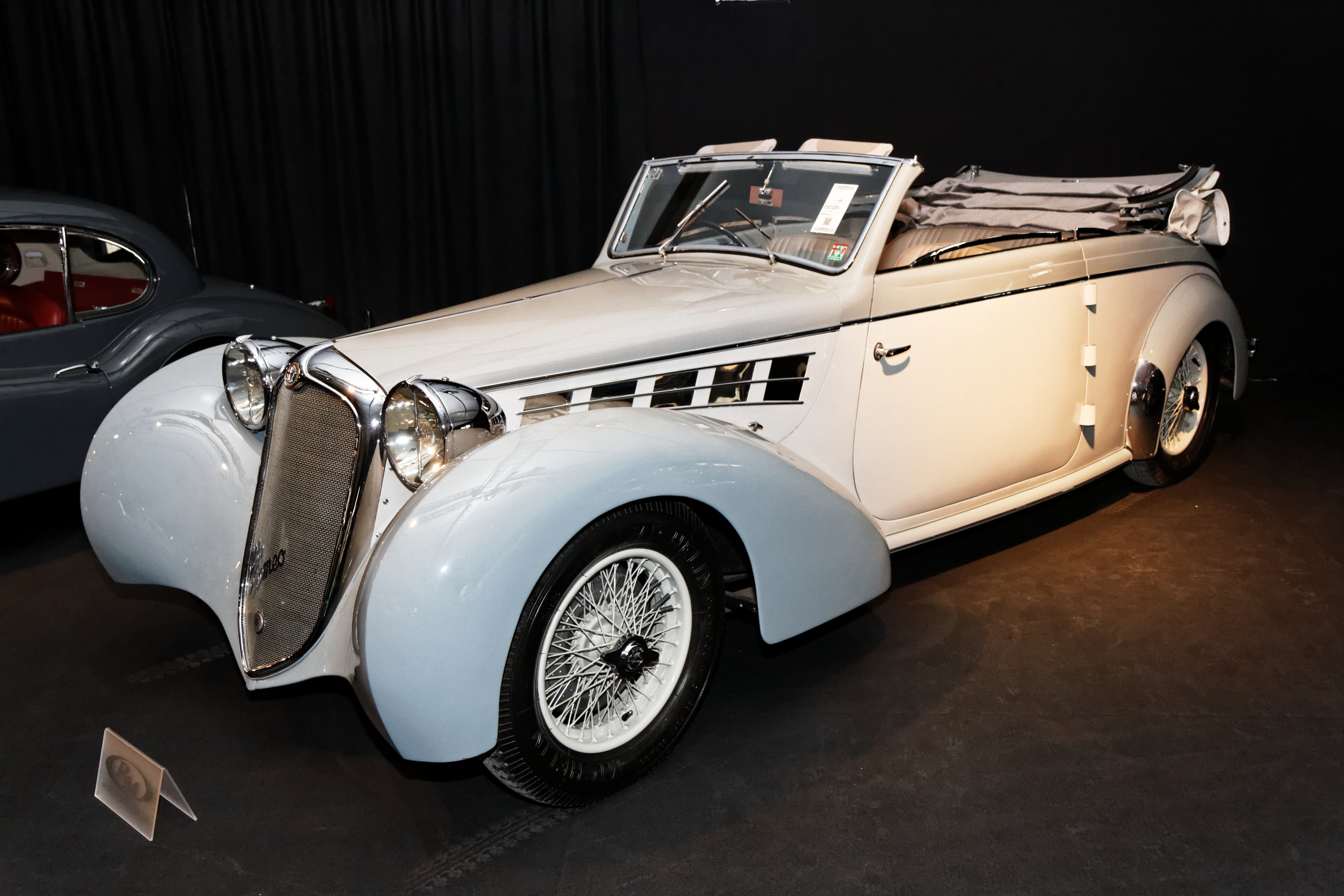
1939 6C 2500 Cabriolet by Gebrüder Tüscher of Zurich. Chassis no: 913014

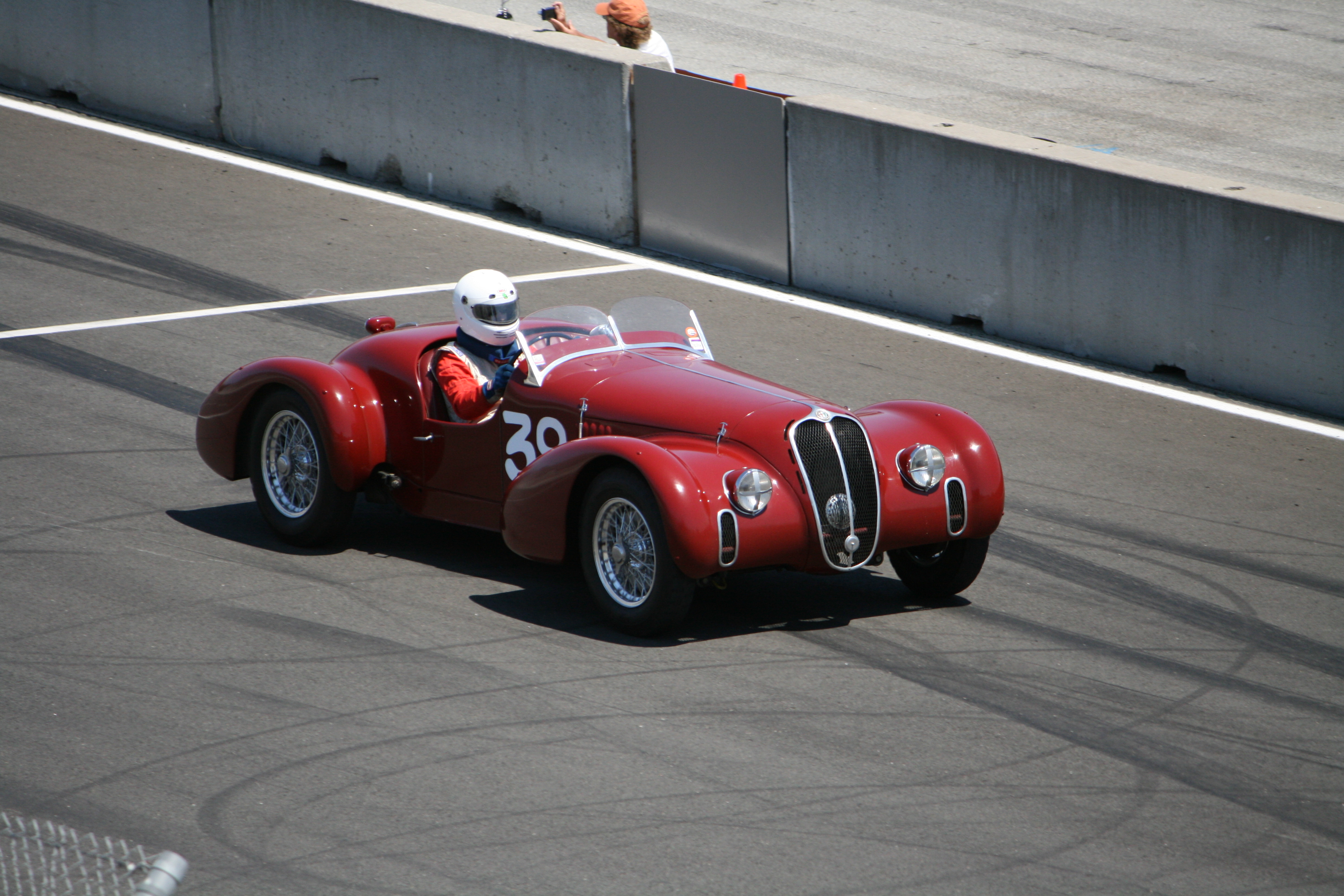
6C 2500 Super Sport Corsa, rebodied to Mille Miglia Spider configuration by Conrad Stevenson.

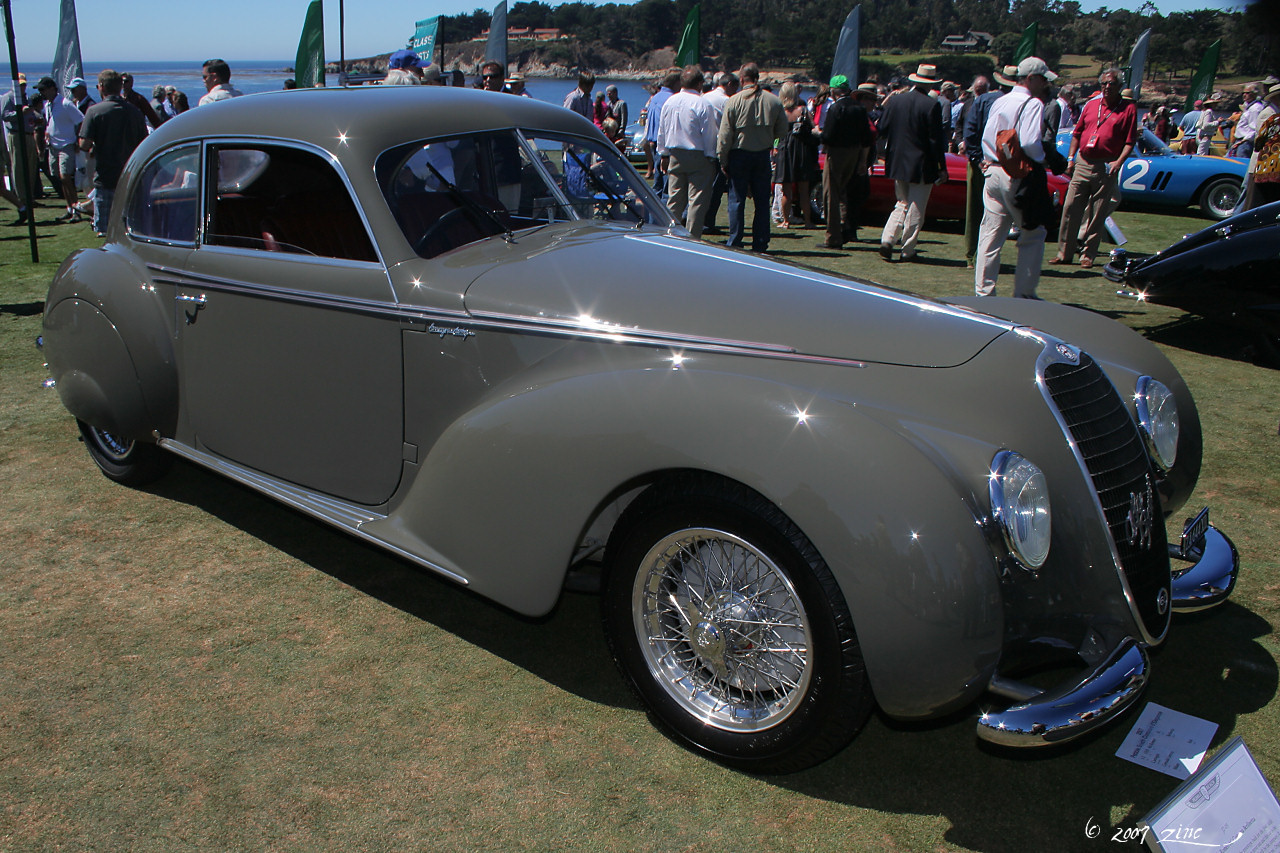
1939 6C 2500 Sport Castagna Berlinetta

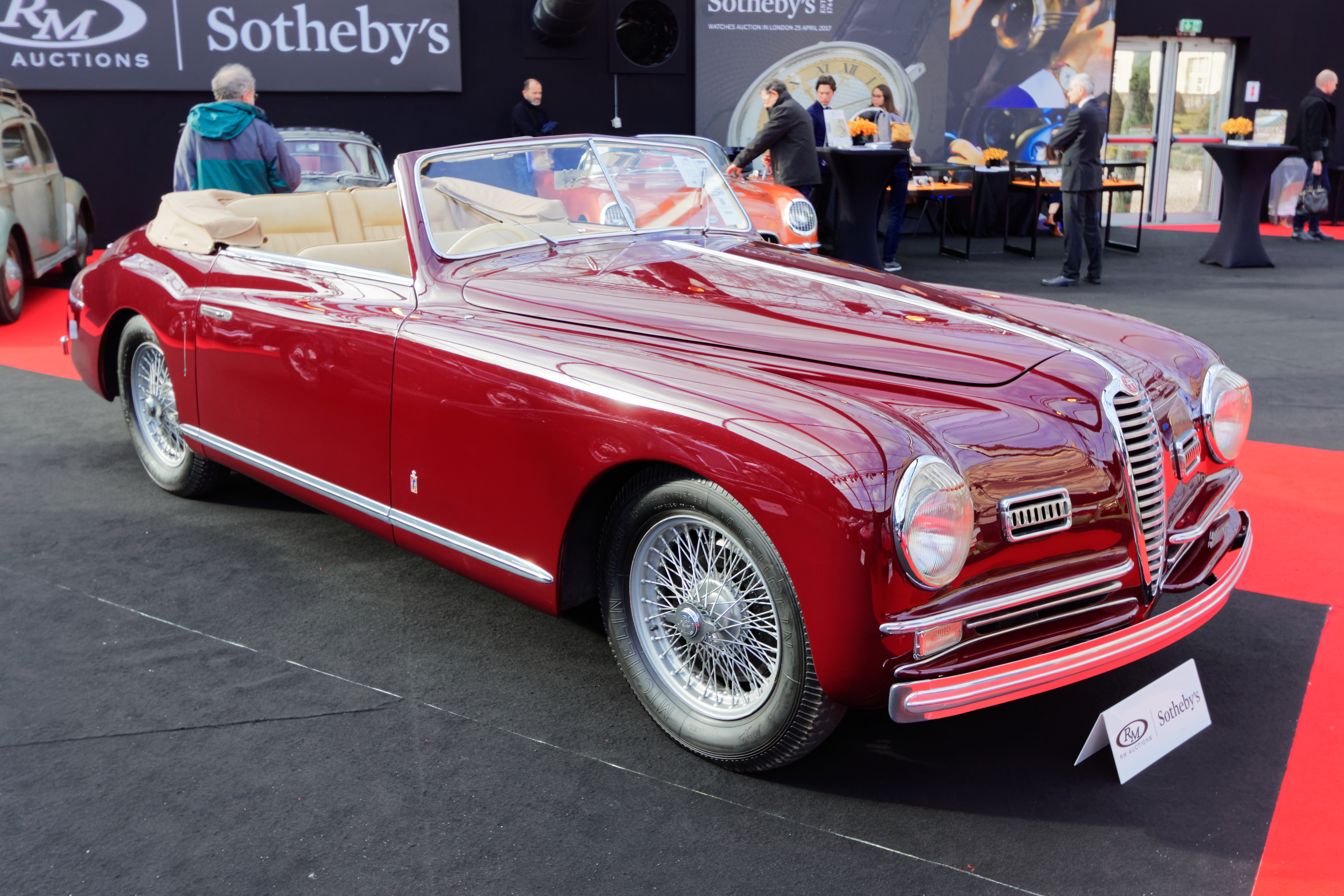
6C 2500 Super Sport Pinin Farina Cabriolet

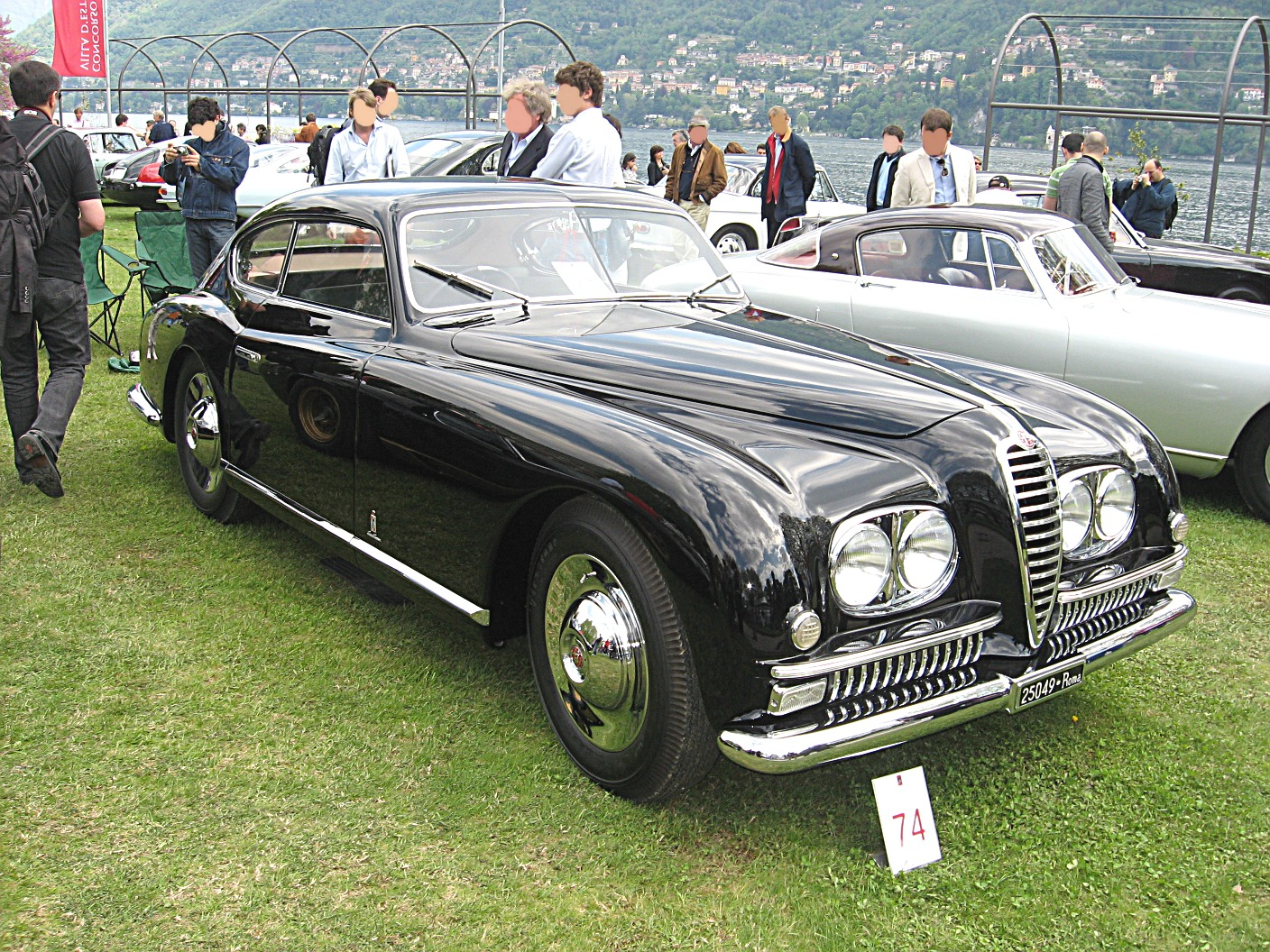
6C 2500 Super Sport Pinin Farina Berlinetta

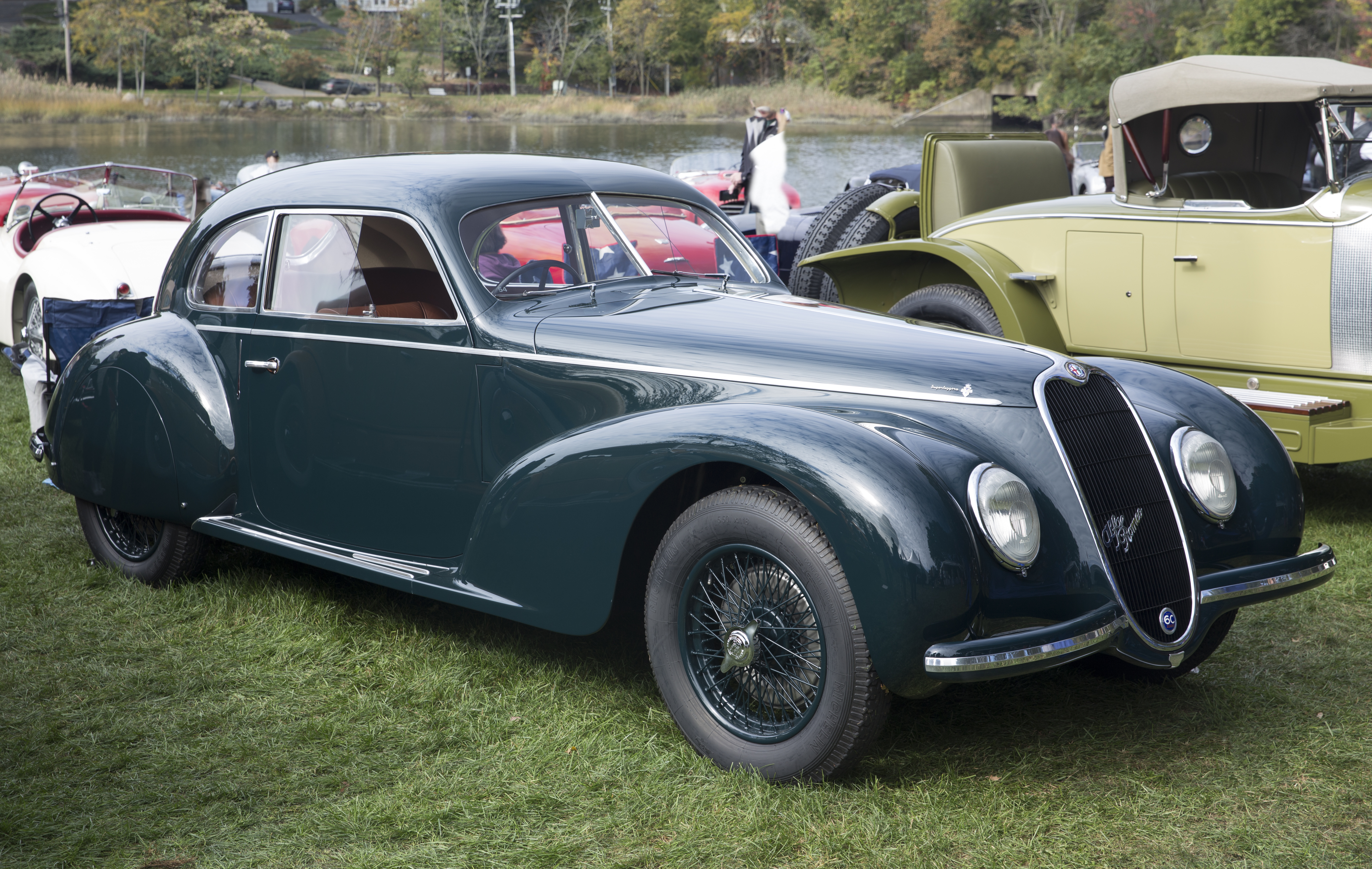
1939 6C 2500 Sport Touring Superleggera Berlinetta

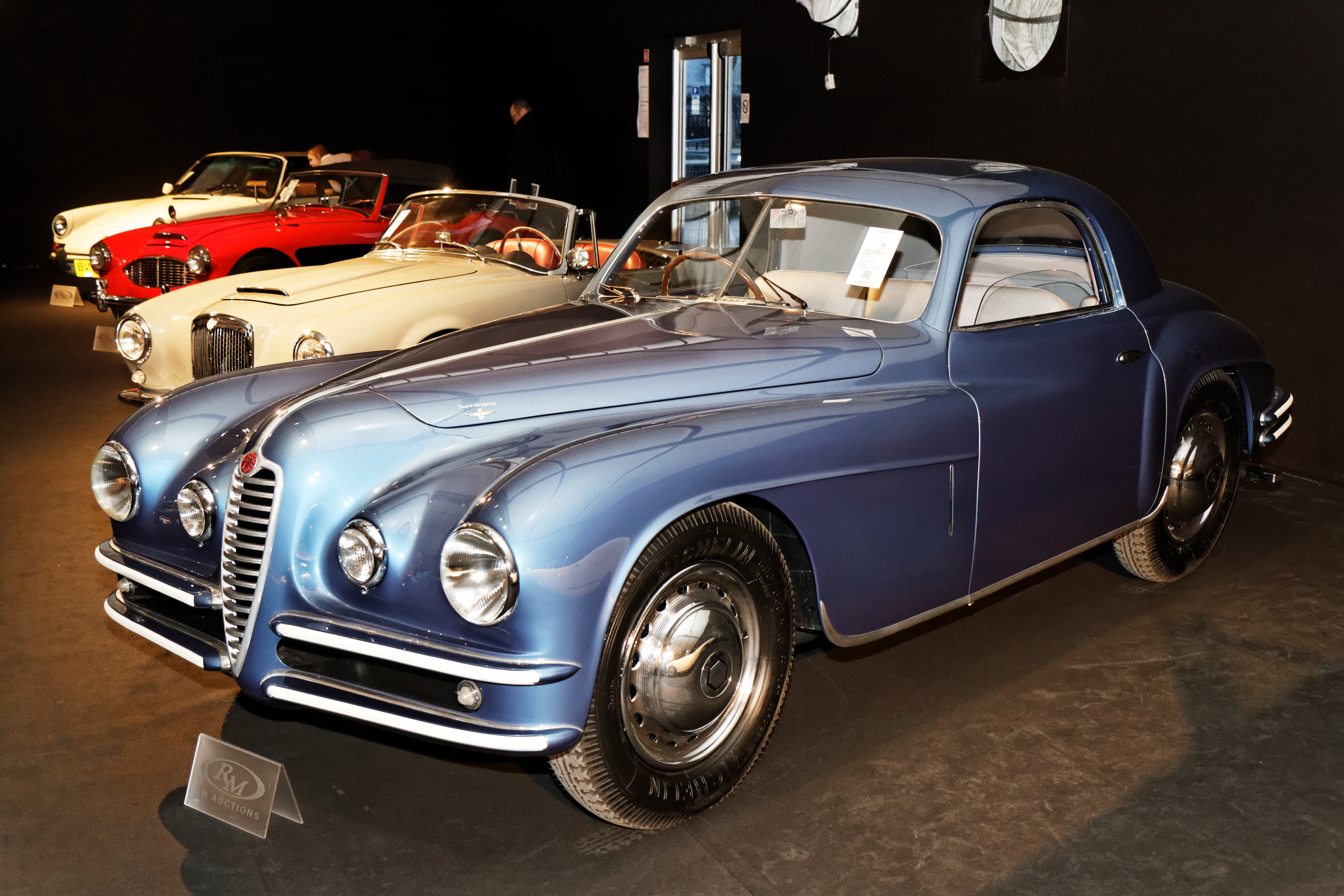
1948 6C 2500 Super Sport Touring Superleggera Berlinetta

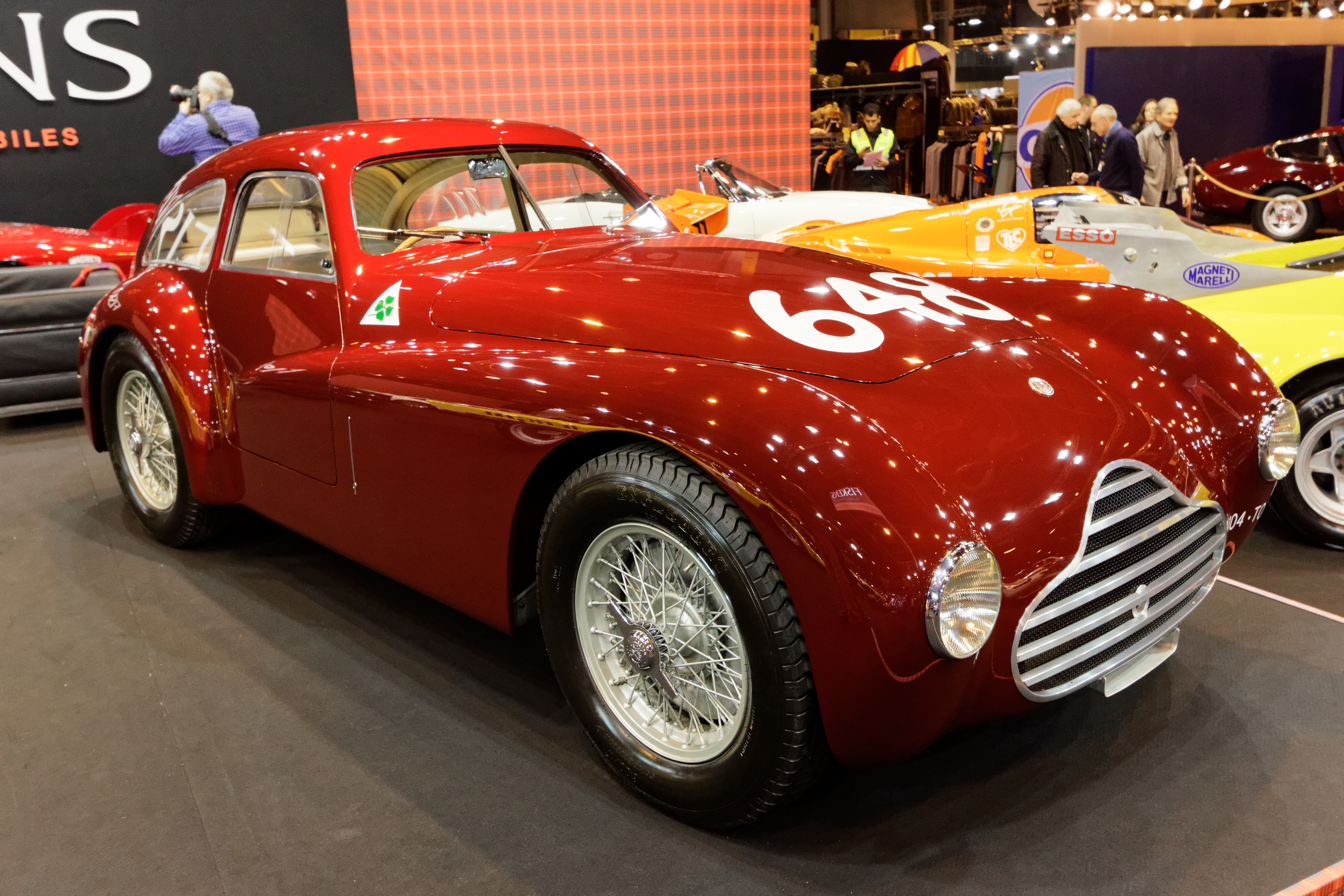
1948 6C 2500 Competizione Berlinetta (bodied in-house)

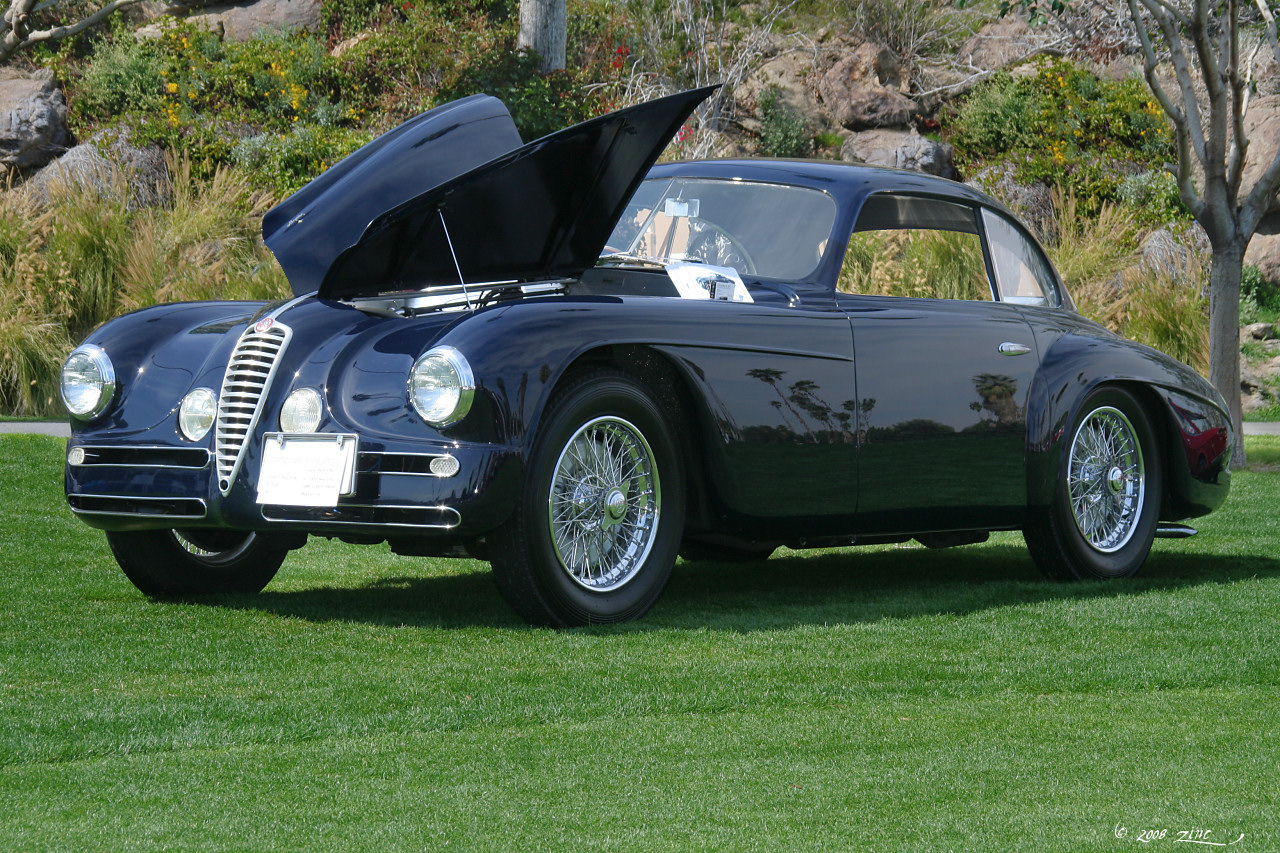
1949 6C 2500 Super Sport 'Villa d'Este' Touring Superleggera Berlinetta

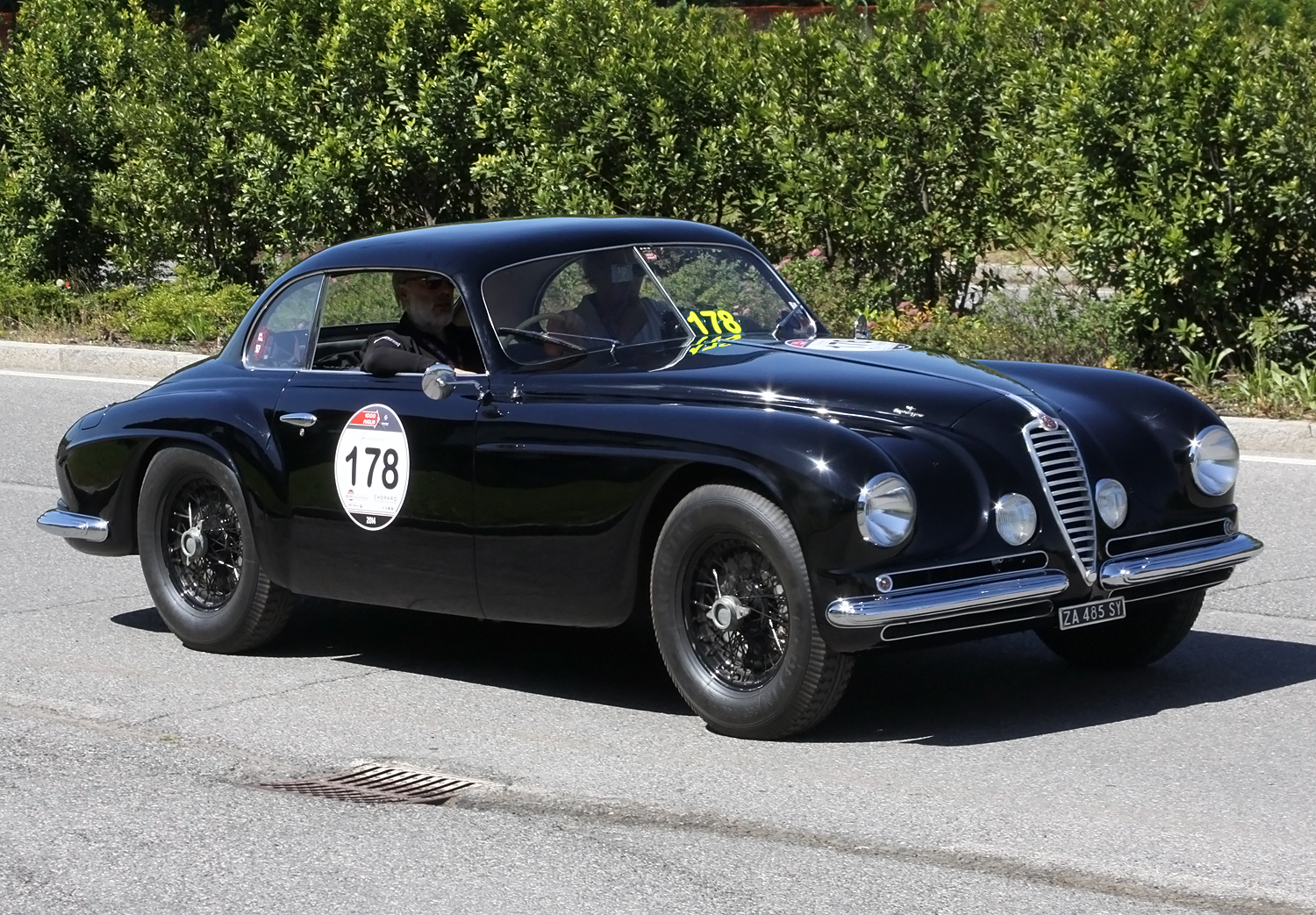
1949 6C 2500 Super Sport 'Villa d'Este' Touring Superleggera Berlinetta at the 2014 Mille Miglia.

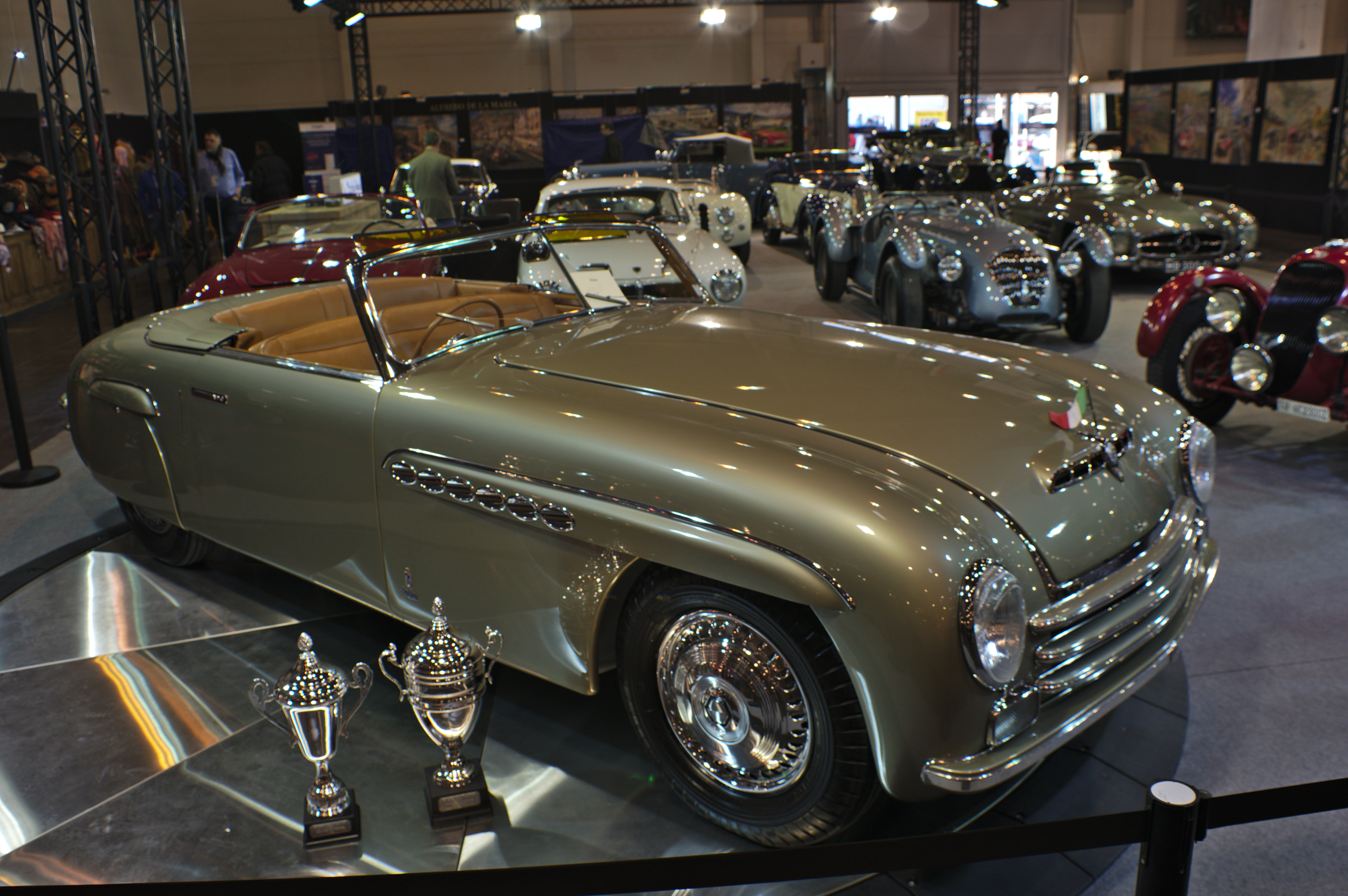
1942–1946 6C 2500 Pinin Farina Cabriolet Speciale

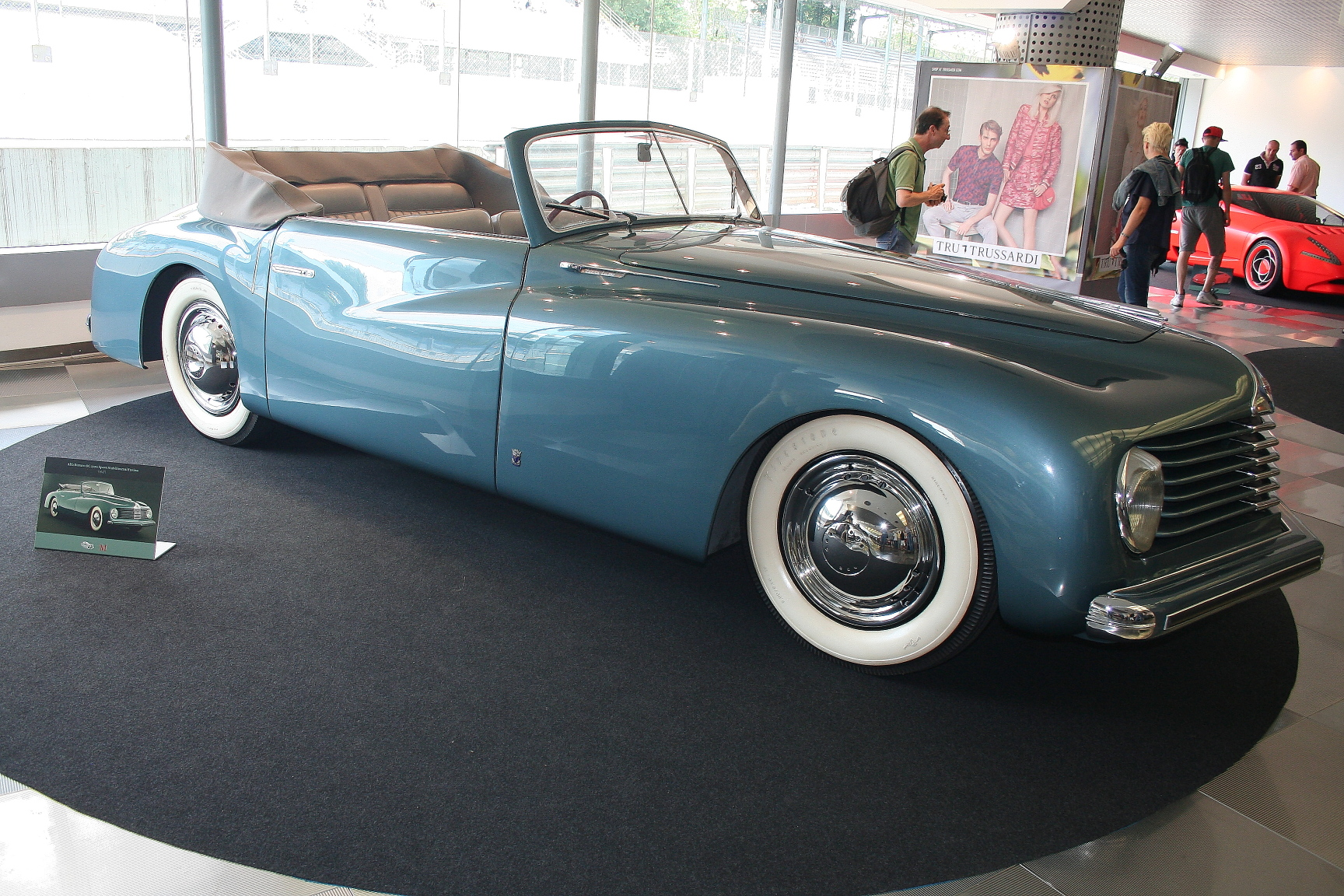
1947 Alfa Romeo 6C 2500 SS Stabilimenti Farina Cabriolet

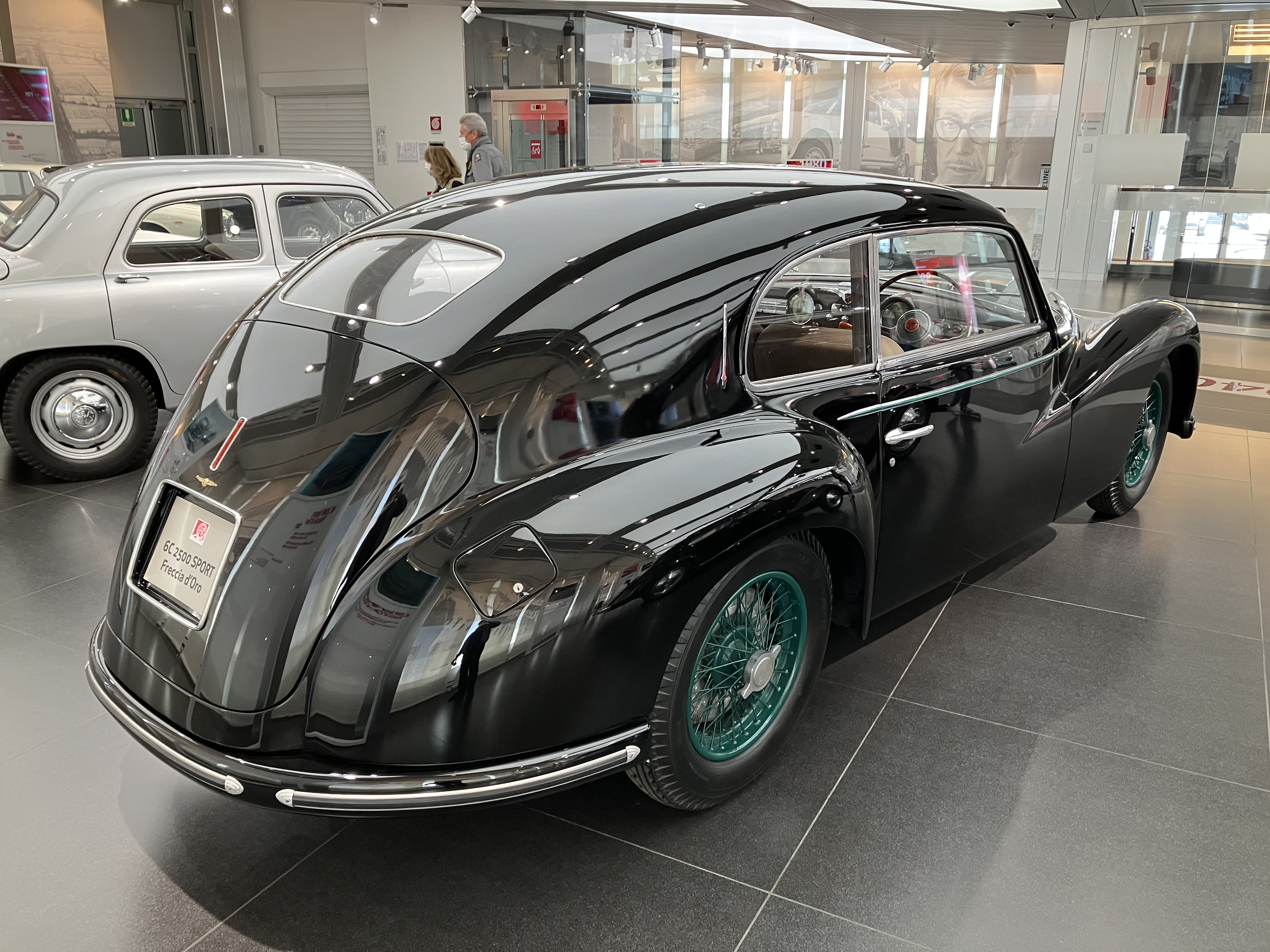
Rear view of the Freccia d'Oro at the Alfa Romeo museum

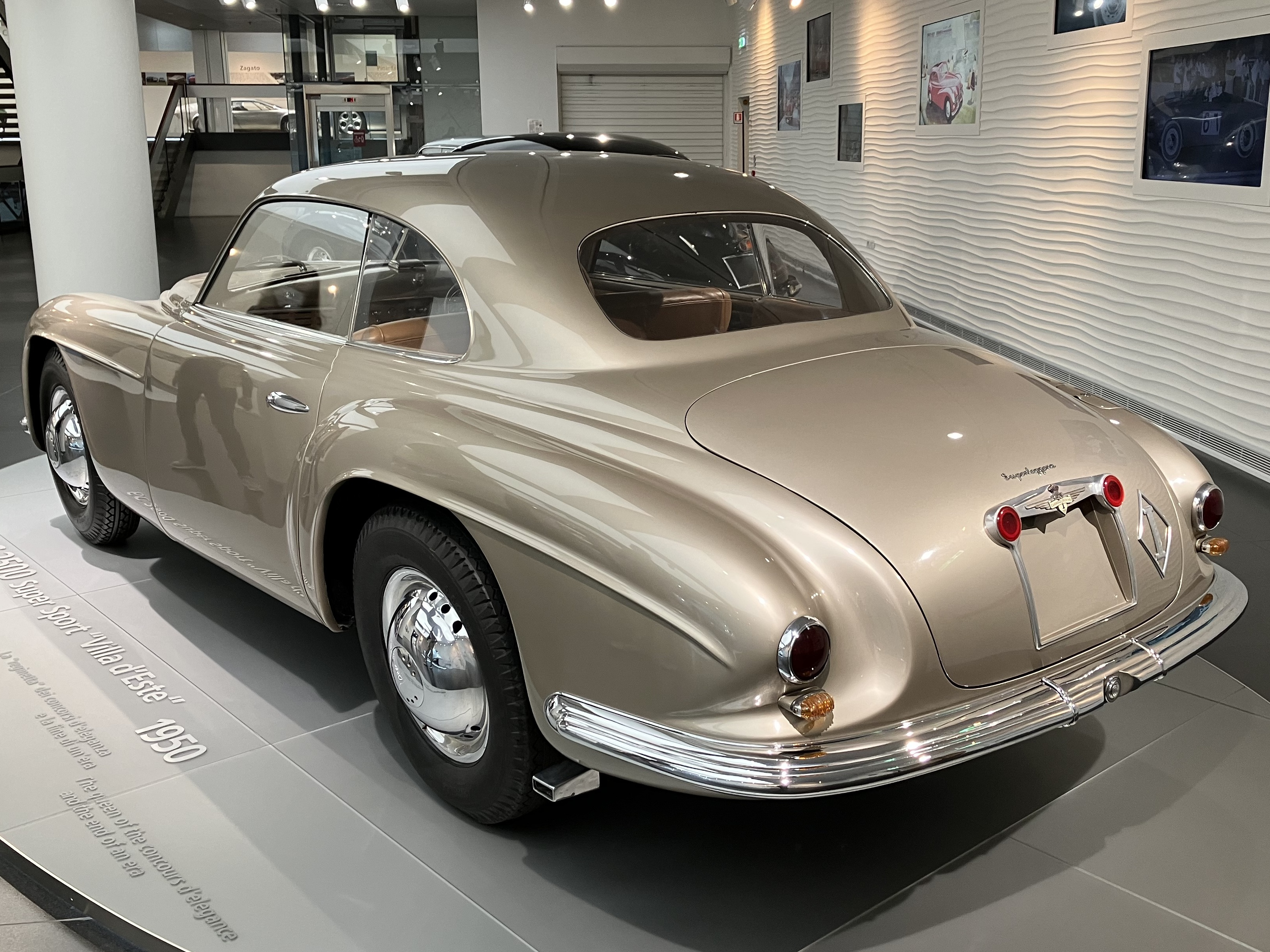
Rear view of the Super Sport Villa d'Este at the Alfa Romeo museum

| Year | 1939 | 1940 | 1941 | 1942 | 1943 | 1944 | 1945 | 1946 | 1947 | 1948 | 1949 | 1950 | 1951 | 1952 | 1953 | Sum |
|---|---|---|---|---|---|---|---|---|---|---|---|---|---|---|---|---|
| Tourismo 6 seats | 73 | 8 | 0 | 0 | 0 | 0 | 0 | 80 | 5 | 0 | 0 | 0 | 0 | 0 | 0 | 166 |
| Tourismo 5 seats | 169 | 63 | 0 | 0 | 47 | 0 | 0 | 0 | 0 | 0 | 0 | 0 | 0 | 0 | 0 | 279 |
| Sport | 66 | 19 | 4 | 53 | 28 | 18 | 3 | 68 | 0 | 0 | 0 | 0 | 0 | 0 | 0 | 259 |
| Super Sport (typ 256) | 20 | 13 | 0 | 0 | 0 | 0 | 0 | 0 | 0 | 0 | 0 | 0 | 0 | 0 | 0 | 33 |
| Super Sport (3. serie) | 0 | 0 | 0 | 12 | 16 | 0 | 0 | 14 | 0 | 0 | 0 | 0 | 0 | 0 | 0 | 42 |
| Coloniale | 2 | 0 | 83 | 67 | 0 | 0 | 0 | 0 | 0 | 0 | 0 | 0 | 0 | 0 | 0 | 152 |
| Sport 1947 | 0 | 0 | 0 | 0 | 0 | 0 | 0 | 0 | 205 | 0 | 0 | 0 | 0 | 0 | 0 | 205 |
| Freccia d'Oro | 0 | 0 | 0 | 0 | 0 | 0 | 0 | 0 | 0 | 291 | 227 | 162 | 0 | 0 | 0 | 680 |
| Super Sport 1947 | 0 | 0 | 0 | 0 | 0 | 0 | 0 | 0 | 71 | 0 | 0 | 0 | 0 | 0 | 0 | 71 |
| Sport 1948 | 0 | 0 | 0 | 0 | 0 | 0 | 0 | 0 | 0 | 22 | 0 | 0 | 0 | 0 | 0 | 22 |
| Super Sport 1948 | 0 | 0 | 0 | 0 | 0 | 0 | 0 | 0 | 0 | 104 | 173 | 17 | 18 | 0 | 0 | 312 |
| Competizione | 0 | 0 | 0 | 0 | 0 | 0 | 0 | 0 | 0 | 3 | 0 | 0 | 0 | 0 | 0 | 3 |
| Tourismo Motor avanzato | 0 | 0 | 0 | 0 | 0 | 0 | 0 | 0 | 0 | 24 | 35 | 18 | 0 | 0 | 0 | 77 |
| Sport Motor avanzato | 0 | 0 | 0 | 0 | 0 | 0 | 0 | 0 | 0 | 0 | 32 | 67 | 50 | 0 | 0 | 149 |
| Sport Motor SS | 0 | 0 | 0 | 0 | 0 | 0 | 0 | 0 | 0 | 0 | 0 | 35 | 40 | 35 | 34 | 144 |
| Sum | 330 | 103 | 87 | 132 | 91 | 18 | 3 | 162 | 281 | 444 | 467 | 299 | 108 | 35 | 34 | 2,594 |

== 6C 3000 (1948–1954) ==
In 1948, a first Alfa Romeo 6C 3000 prototype was built. It was a 5–6 passenger 4-door saloon car of the same class as the 6C 2500, but which could be built using more modern and economical manufacturing processes.

Like its predecessor, the three-litre engine had a cast iron block, an aluminium head with hemispherical combustion chambers, two valves per cylinder, angled 90° and timed by directly acting, chain driven dual overhead camshafts. Fed by a twin-choke carburettor, it developed 120 PS (88 kW), sent to the rear wheels through a 4-speed all-synchromesh gearbox with a column-mounted shifter as on the 6C 2500.

The car used unit body construction, had a wheelbase of 3.05 m (120 in) and a dry weight of 1,400 kg. The all-independent suspension was of the double wishbone type with coil springs upfront, and trailing arm type with transverse torsion bars at the rear.

After three prototypes had been made between 1948 and 1949, the project was abandoned when market analysis and product planning suggested the development of a smaller four-cylinder car—the Alfa Romeo 1900. Despite this, the 3-litre engine was developed for competition use and gave birth to a number sports racing cars during the first half of the 1950s: the 6C 3000 C50, 6C 3000 CM and 6C 3000 PR.

=== Specifications ===
| Model | Engine | Displacement Bore x stroke | Compr. ratio | Carburettor(s) | Peak power | Top speed |
|---|---|---|---|---|---|---|
| 6C 3000 | I6 DOHC | 2,955 cc 82.55 x 92 mm | 7.5:1 | 1x downdraught twin-choke | 120 PS (88 kW) at 4,800 rpm | 166 km/h (103 mph) |
| 6C 3000 C50 | I6 DOHC | 2,955 cc 82.55 x 92 mm | 8.6:1 | 3x sidedraught twin-choke | 168 PS (124 kW) at 6,000 rpm | 226 km/h (140 mph) |
| 6C 3000 CM | I6 DOHC | 3,495 cc 87 x 98 mm | 8.2:1 | 6x sidedraught single-choke | 246 PS (181 kW) or 275 PS (202 kW) at 6,500 rpm | 250 km/h (155 mph) |
| 6C 3000 PR | I6 DOHC | 2,943 cc 87 x 83 mm | – | 6x sidedraught single-choke | 260 PS (191 kW) at 7,000 rpm | 260 km/h (162 mph) |

=== 6C 3000 C50 ===
In 1950, a 6C 3000 engine from the prototypes was tuned for racing and installed in a 6C 2500 Competizione, which became the 6C 3000 C50. Being based on a 6C 2500 chassis, the car had a ladder frame with a 2.50 m (98 in) wheelbase, and a dry weight of 870 kg (1,918 lb). Three twin-choke carburettors and a raised compression ratio brought the output of the three-litre straight six to 168 PS (124 kW). This one-off racing car was entered at the 1950 Mille Miglia with number 740, driven by Sanesi and Bianchi; the car did not finish the race, as the two had to withdraw near Ferrara.

=== 6C 3000 CM ===
Alfa Romeo 6C 3000 CM Alfa Romeo 6C 3000 PR
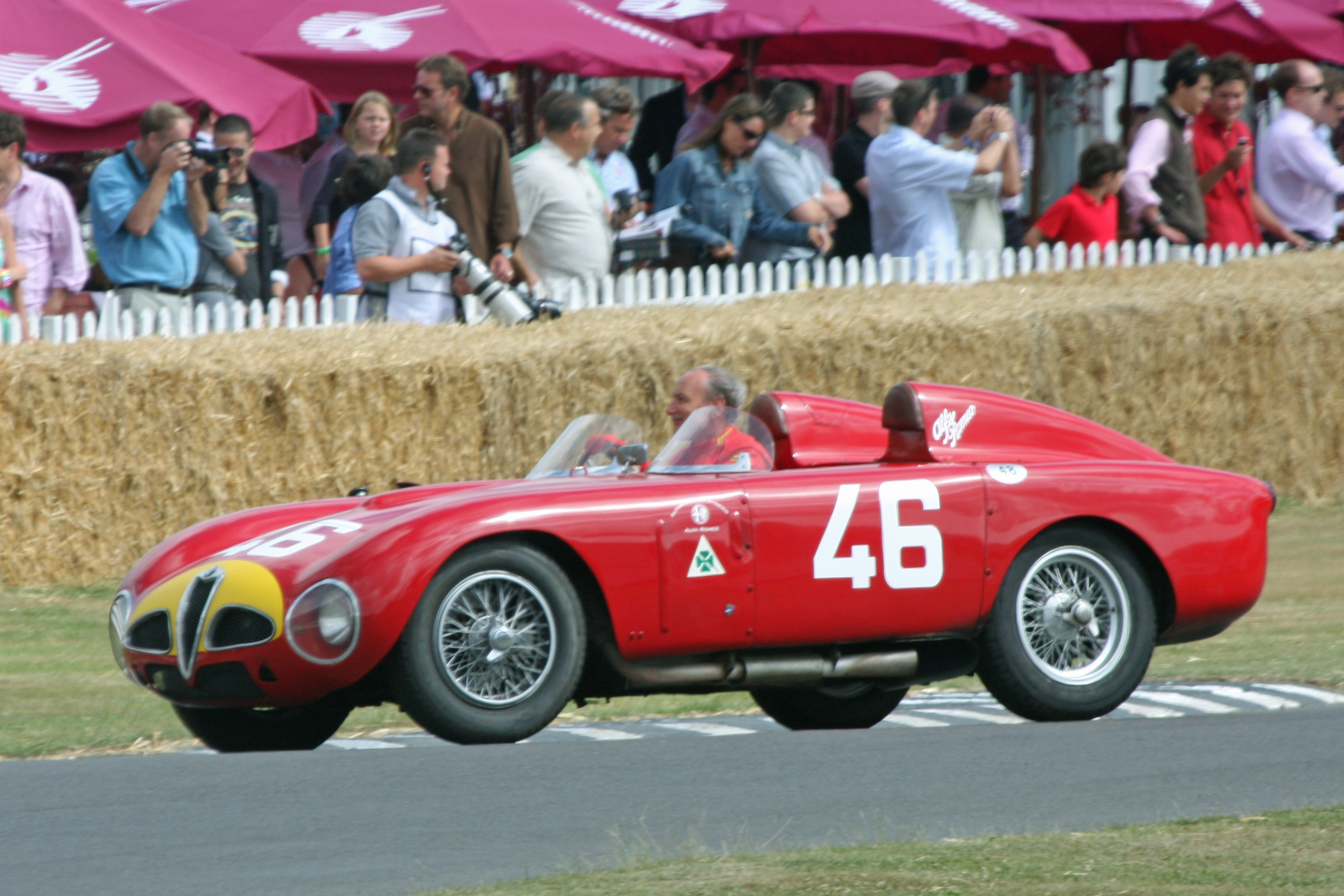
- The 6C 3000 CM spider of Museo Storico Alfa Romeo at Goodwood Festival of Speed 2009
- Constructor: Alfa Romeo

Technical specifications
- Chassis: Tube spaceframe with backbone
- Suspension (front): Double wishbones, coil springs, hydraulic dampers, anti-roll bar
- Suspension (rear): De Dion tube, torque arms, coil springs, hydraulic dampers
- Wheelbase: 2.25 m (88.6 in) (CM); 2.20 m (86.6 in) (PR)
- Engine: 3,495 cc (213.3 cu in) (CM); 2,943 cc (179.6 cu in) (PR)
- Transmission: 5-speed, limited-slip differential
- Weight: 960 kg (2,116.4 lb) (CM coupé); 930 kg (2,050.3 lb) (CM spider); 920 kg (2,028.3 lb) (PR)
- Brakes: Hydraulic, drums, rears inboard

Competition history

In 1952, engine parts of the 6C 3000 were used again on the 6C 3000 CM—for Competizione Maggiorata or Competition Enlarged Displacement.

The powerplant comes from a project by Giuseppe Busso. It differed from its predecessor by still using several components of the 3-litre engine from the 6C 3000 prototype, but engine capacity was increased to 3,495 cc (213.3 cu in).

The chassis was a tube frame based around a centre backbone; suspension was by double wishbones and De Dion tube at the rear. Six examples were built: four coupés and two spiders, bodied by Carrozzeria Colli.

==== Competition history ====
A coupé was driven by Juan Manuel Fangio and Giulio Sala to a second overall finish at the 1953 Mille Miglia. For the Mille Miglia the engine had been tuned to put out 275 PS (202 kW). Fangio was leading the race, but a problem with the steering forced him to slow down. Again with Fangio at the wheel, a spider won the 1st Gran Premio Supercortemaggiore held in Merano in 1953.

==== Fate ====
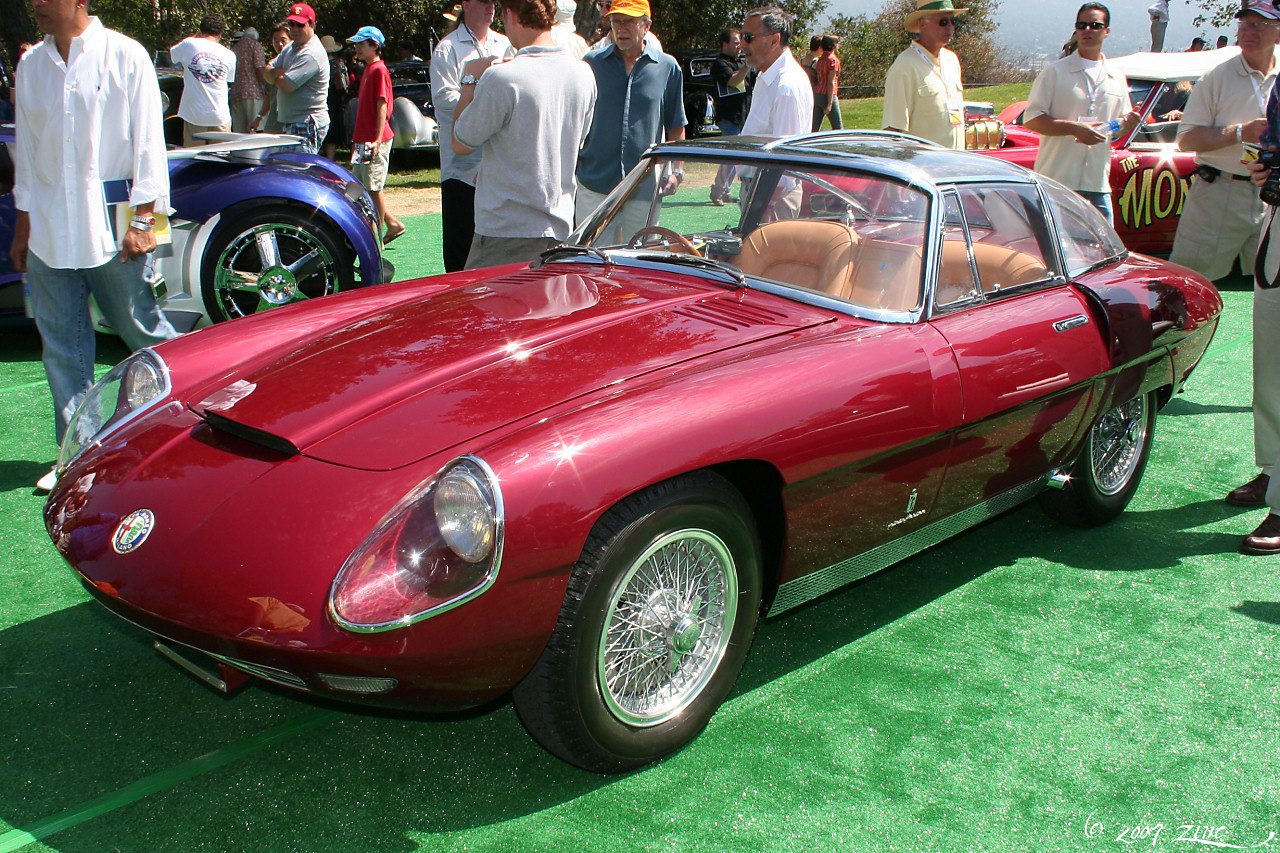
1960 Alfa Romeo Superflow IV

With the end of its racing career, the 1953 Supercortemaggiore winner 6C 3000 CM spider was used by the Experimemtal Department of Alfa Romeo for testing new components. Amongst them were disc brakes, installed in 1955, which are still present today on this vehicle, part of the Museo Storico Alfa Romeo collection.

The ex-1953 Mille Miglia coupé was given to Pinin Farina, and rebodied four times into four different show cars to Aldo Brovarone's design:

- 1956: Alfa Romeo Superflow. Shown at the 1956 Turin Motor Show, coupé body with plexiglas front wings and tail fins.
- 1956: Alfa Romeo Superflow II. Shown at the 1956 Paris Motor Show, coupé body with steel wings and tail fins.
- 1959: Alfa Romeo Spider Super Sport. Shown at the 1959 Geneva Motor Show, roadster body without tail fins.
- 1960: Alfa Romeo Superflow IV. Shown at the 1960 Geneva Motor Show, coupé body without tail fins. The car survives today in this last configuration.

==== 6C 3000 PR ====
One of the two 6C 3000 CM spiders was modified to cope with the new rules of the International Sport Category, enacted in the 1954 season, which limited engine capacity to 3 litres. The 3000 CM's 3.5-litre straight-six was de-stroked to 2,943 cc. This car was renamed 6C 3000 PR, for Passo Ridotto or Reduced Wheelbase, as the wheelbase was shortened by 50 cm (19.7 in).

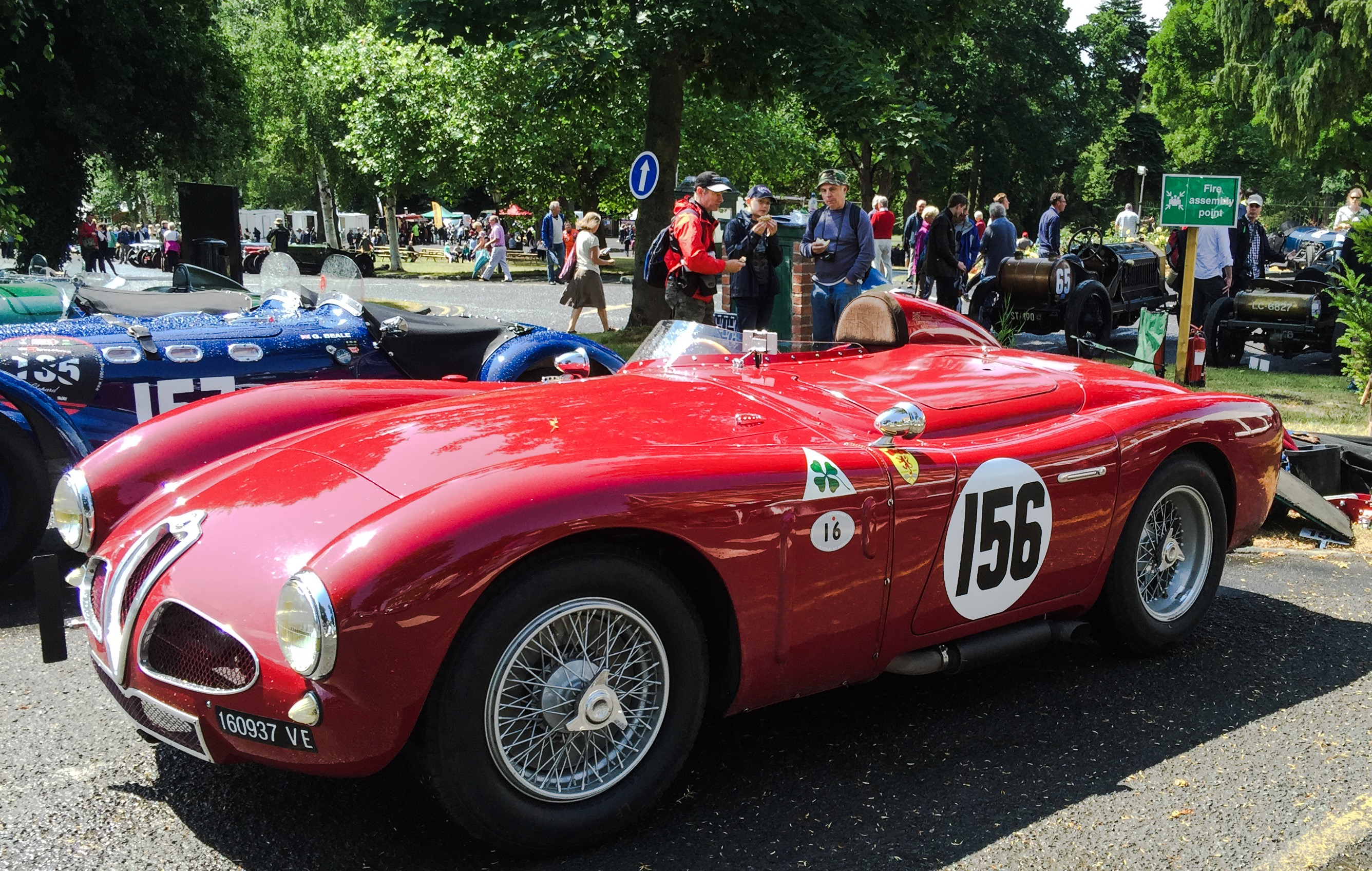
The 3000 PR at Chateau Impney on 12 July 2015.

The 6C 3000 PR was entered at the 2nd Gran Premio Supercortemaggiore held at Monza in 1954, driven by Sanesi; the vehicle was written off in a crash, in which Sanesi was also injured. It was resurrected from a museum in Brazil in the mid-1980s.

== Technical data ==
| Alfa Romeo 6C | 6C 1500 Sports Two Seater | 6C 1750 SS Zagato Spider | 6C 1900 Gran Turismo | 6C 2300 B Pescara | 6C 2500 SS Corsa Spider | 6C 3000 CM |
|---|---|---|---|---|---|---|
| Engine: | Front mounted 6-cylinder in-line engine |
| Displacement: | 1487 cm³ | 1752 cm³ | 1917 cm³ | 2309 cm³ | 2443 cm³ | 3495 cm³ |
| Bore x stroke: | 62 x 82 mm | 65 x 88 mm | 68 x 88 mm | 70 x 100 mm | 72 x 100 mm | 87 x 98 mm |
| Max power at rpm: | 44 hp at 4 200 rpm | 85 hp at 4 500 rpm | 68 hp at 4 500 rpm | 95 hp at 4 500 rpm | 125 hp at 4 750 rpm | 275 hp at 6 500 rpm |
| Valve control: | 2 overhead camshafts, 2 valves per cylinder, DOHC |
| Compression: | 5.8:1 | 5.0:1 | 6.25:1 | 7.8:1 | 8.0:1 | 8.2:1 |
| Carburetor: | Memini DOA | | 2 Weber | | 3 Weber 36 | 6 Weber |
| Upload: | Naturally Aspirated | Roots compressor | Naturally Aspirated |
| Gearbox: | 4-speed manual | | | | | 5-speed manual |
| Suspension front: | live axle, semi-elliptic leaf springs, friction type shock absorbers | | | double wishbones, coil springs, hydraulic shock absorbers | twin trailing arms, coil springs, hydraulic shock absorbers | double wishbones, coil springs, hydraulic shock absorbers, anti-roll bar |
| Suspension rear: | live axle, semi-elliptic leaf springs, friction type shock absorbers | | | swing axles, trailing arms, torsion bars, hydraulic shock absorbers | swing axles, radius arms, longitudinal torsion bars, friction dampers and tubular shock absorbers | DeDion axle, oblique arms, coil springs, telescopic shock absorbers |
| Brakes: | drums | | | | | hydraulic drums |
| Chassis & body: | body on ladder frame | | | | | Aluminium body on steel ladder frame |
| Wheelbase: | 310 cm | 275 cm | 292 cm | 300 cm | 270 cm | 225 cm |
| Dry weight: | 1000 kg | 920 kg | 1250 kg | 1380 kg | 1130 kg | 930 kg |
| Top speed: | 110 km/h | 145 km/h | 130 km/h | | 200 km/h | 250 km/h |

== Bibliography ==
- Borgeson, Griffith (1990). The Alfa Romeo Tradition. City: Haynes (Foulis) Publishing Group Ltd. Somerset, UK. ISBN 0-85429-875-4.
- Fusi, Luigi (1978). Alfa Romeo—Tutte le vetture dal 1910—All cars from 1910 (3rd ed.). Milan: Emmeti Grafica editrice.
