= Giulio Ramponi =

Giulio Ramponi (8 January 1902 – December 1986) was an Italian automobile technician and racing driver. As a racing driver, he specialized in endurance racings.

== Career ==
He was born in Milan where he worked for the Florentia car maker and the Pelizzola maker of fuel pumps. In 1918, he became the mechanic of his stepfathers friend, opera singer Giuseppe Campari (1892–1933) who won at Mugello in 1920 with Alfa Romeo. In 1924, Ramponi became chief riding mechanic and co-driver for Antonio Ascari (1888–1925) and his Alfa Romeo P2, in which Ascari was killed in 1925. Ramponi was not in the car, since a GP rule change in 1925 eliminated the use of riding mechanics. Ascari died in his arms.

Working under Vittorio Jano (1891–1965), he was test driver for Alfa Romeo 6C in 1927, and again, chief mechanic and co-driver for Campari. They won Mille Miglia in 1928 and 1929. He also raced in England, winning the 1928 Brooklands 6-hour race, and the 1929 Brooklands Double 12 Hour race in an Alfa Romeo 6C. After losing his job in 1929, he worked for Tim Birkin (1896–1933) and the Dorothy Paget team. In 1932, he was again at Alfa for the Alfa Romeo P3 project.

In 1934, he became team leader with Whitney Straight (1912–79) and they won the First South African Grand Prix, and in 1935 started to work as mechanic to Dick Seaman (1913–39).

== Personal life ==
Ramponi became a British citizen in the 1930s. During World War II he was interned on the Isle of Man and his first wife died from peritonitis. In 1947, he married Irene Cooper. He worked for 20 years as a consultant to various automobile and aircraft companies and in 1968 he and his wife moved to South Africa.

== Gallery ==
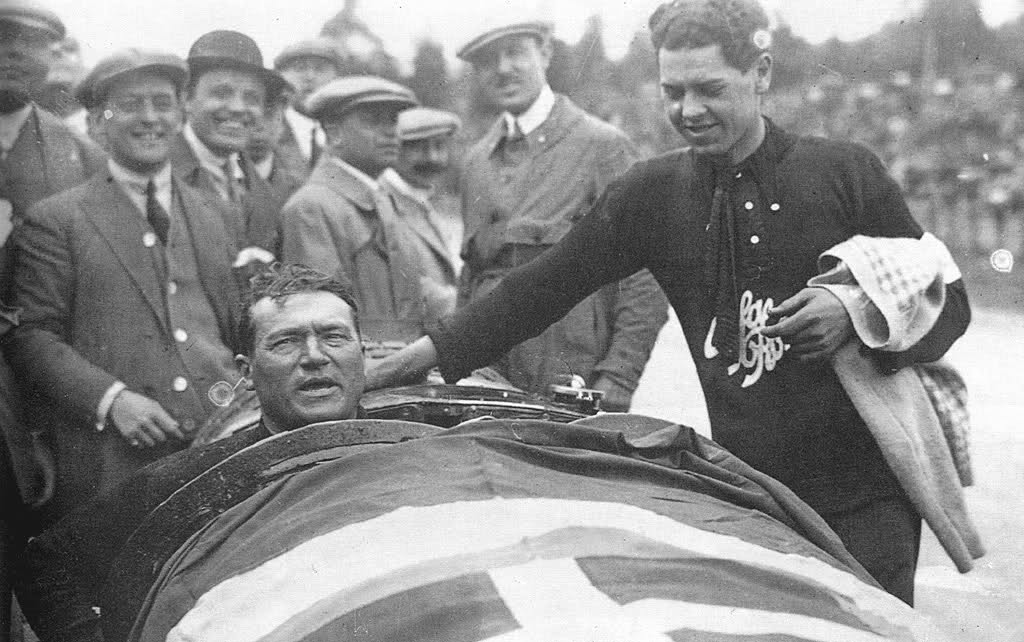
Antonio Ascari (1888–1925) and Ramponi won 1925 Belgian Grand Prix in an Alfa Romeo P2. Ascari died less than a month later in the 1925 French Grand Prix.

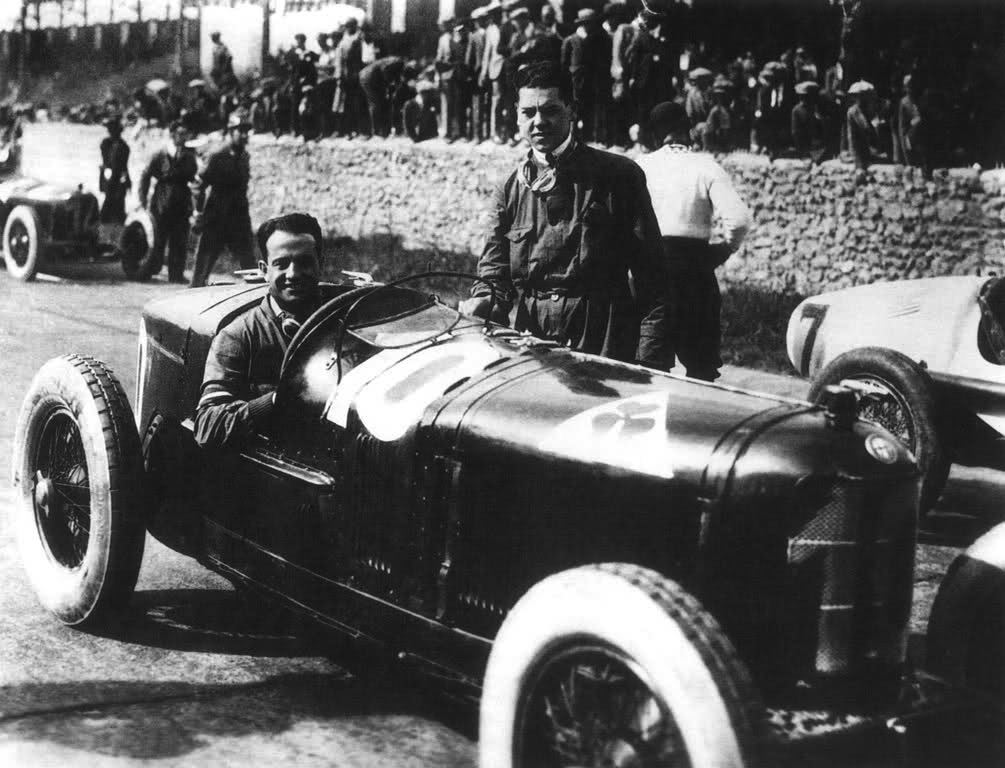
With Pete DePaolo and an Alfa P2 at Monza in 1925

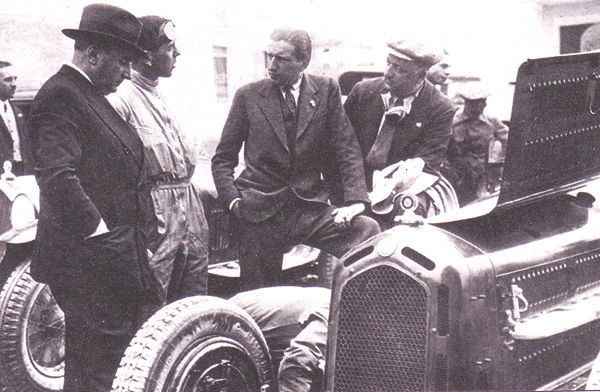
From left: Edoardo Weber, Ramponi, Carlo Felice Trossi and Enzo Ferrari of the Scuderia Ferrari team in June 1933. The car is an Alfa Romeo 8C 2300 "Monza".
