= 1925 Belgian Grand Prix =

- Race 2 of 4 in the 1925 World Manufacturers' Championship
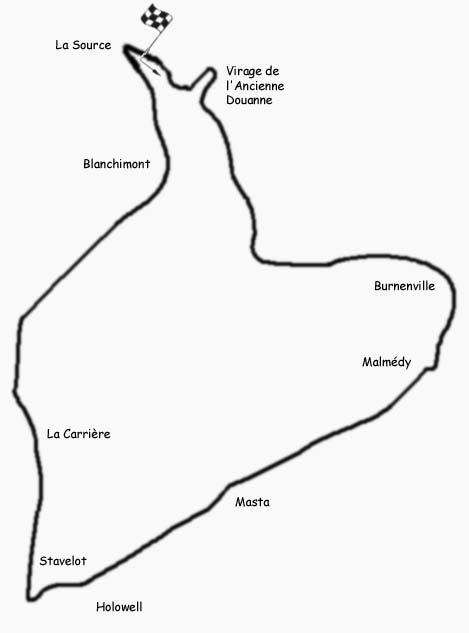

Race details
- Date: 28 June 1925
- Official name: I Grand Prix de Belgique
- Location: Spa-Francorchamps; Spa, Belgium
- Course: Road course
- Course length: 14.98 km (9.31 miles)
- Distance: 54 laps, 809.06 km (502.73 miles)

Pole position
Driver	(France) René Thomas	Delage
- Grid positions set by car number

Fastest lap
Driver	(Italy) Antonio Ascari	Alfa Romeo
- Time: 6:51.2

Podium
First	(Italy) Antonio Ascari	Alfa Romeo
Second	(Italy) Giuseppe Campari	Alfa Romeo
Third	No other finishers	

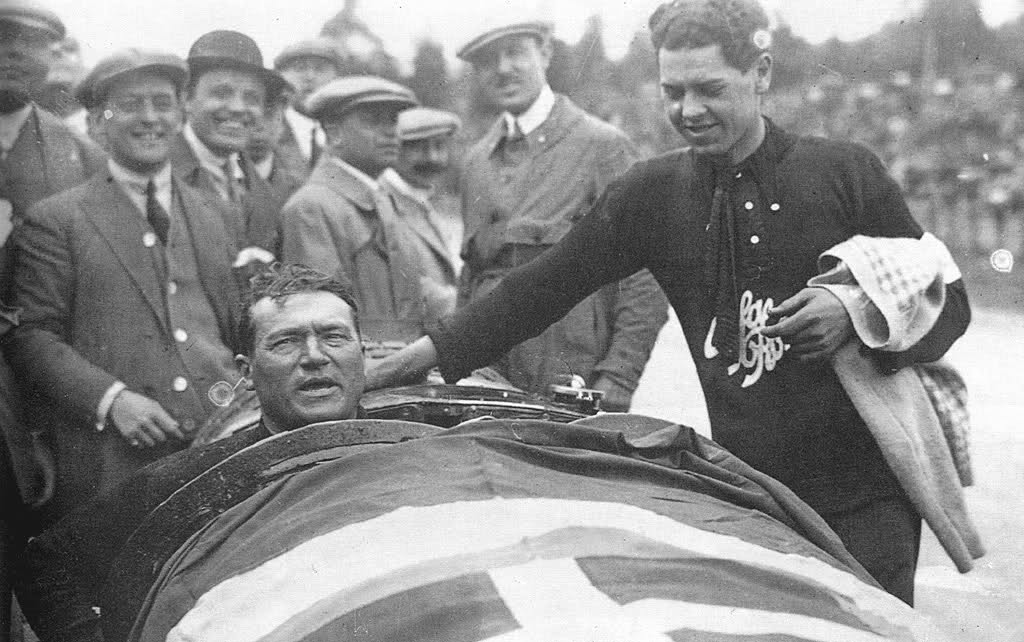
Antonio Ascari (1888–1925) and his mechanic Giulio Ramponi (1902–86) in the Alfa Romeo P2. Ascari died less than a month later in the 1925 French Grand Prix.

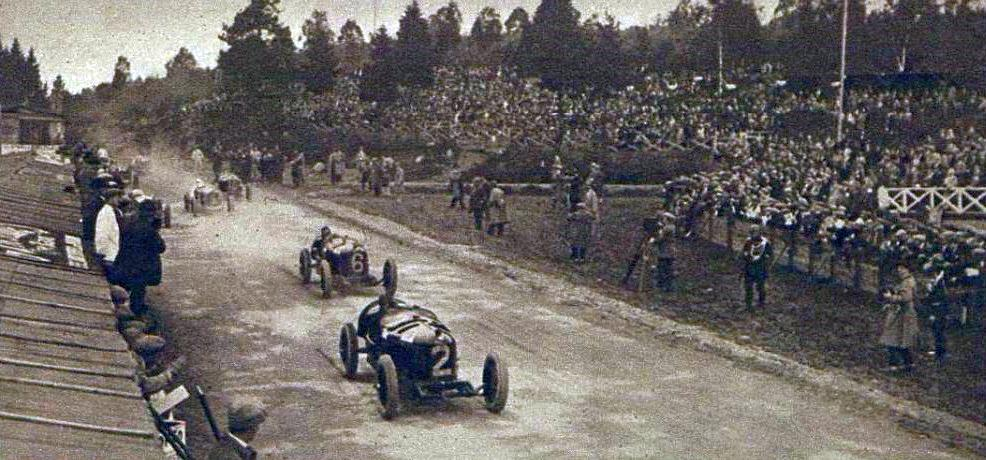
Start of the Grand Prix, Antonio Ascari leads Giuseppe Campari.

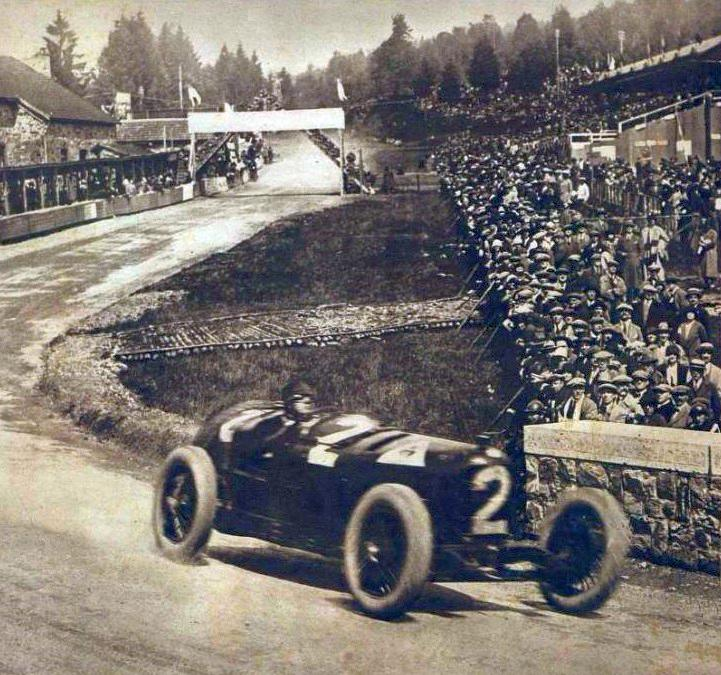
Antonio Ascari during the race.

The 1925 Belgian Grand Prix was a Grand Prix motor race held at Spa-Francorchamps on the 28th of June 1925. This was the first ever grand prix held at Spa, and the first ever Belgian Grand Prix.

== Entries ==
No	Driver	Entrant	Constructor	Chassis
1	(France) René Thomas	Automobiles Delage	Delage	2LCV
2	(Italy) Antonio Ascari	Alfa Corse	Alfa Romeo	P2
3	(United Kingdom) Henry Segrave	Sunbeam	Sunbeam	
4	(Spain) Pierre de Vizcaya	Automobiles Ettore Bugatti	Bugatti	Type 35
5	(France) Robert Benoist	Automobiles Delage	Delage	2LCV
6	(Italy) Giuseppe Campari	Alfa Corse	Alfa Romeo	P2
7	(Italy) Giulio Masetti	Sunbeam	Sunbeam	
8	(Italy) Meo Constantini	Automobiles Ettore Bugatti	Bugatti	Type 35
9	(France) Albert Divo	Automobiles Delage	Delage	2LCV
10	(Italy) Gastone Brilli-Peri	Alfa Corse	Alfa Romeo	P2
11	(Italy) Caberto Conelli	Sunbeam	Sunbeam	
12	(France) Paul Torchy	Automobiles Delage	Delage	2LCV

== Classification ==
=== Race ===
Pos	No	Driver	Constructor	Laps	Time/Retired	Grid
1	2	(Italy) Antonio Ascari	Alfa Romeo	54	6:42:57	2
2	6	(Italy) Giuseppe Campari	Alfa Romeo	54	+21:58	4
Ret	9	(France) Albert Divo	Delage	29	Valves	5
Ret	10	(Italy) Gastone Brilli-Peri	Alfa Romeo	18	Suspension	6
Ret	1	(France) René Thomas	Delage	6	Fire	1
Ret	12	(France) Paul Torchy	Delage	2	Ignition	7
Ret	5	(France) Robert Benoist	Delage	1	Fuel tank	3

=== Starting Grid Positions ===
1st Row	1 Pos.		2 Pos.		3 Pos.
	(France); Thomas; Delage		(Italy); Ascari; Alfa Romeo		(France); Benoist; Delage
2nd Row		1 Pos.		2 Pos.	
		(Italy); Campari; Alfa Romeo		(France); Divo; Delage	
3rd Row	1 Pos.		2 Pos.		3 Pos.
	(Italy); Brilli-Peri; Alfa Romeo		(France); Torchy; Delage		

== Notes ==
- Segrave, de Vizcaya, Masetti, Constantini and Conelli did not turn up because their cars were not ready.

Grand Prix Race
Previous race: 1925 Indianapolis 500	1925 Grand Prix season Grandes Épreuves	Next race: 1925 French Grand Prix
Previous race: None	Belgian Grand Prix	Next race: 1930 Belgian Grand Prix
Previous race: 1924 French Grand Prix	European Grand Prix (Designated European Grand Prix)	Next race: 1926 San Sebastián Grand Prix
