= 1924 Italian Grand Prix =

Race details
- Date: 19 October 1924
- Official name: IV Gran Premio d'Italia
- Location: Monza, Italy
- Course: Autodromo Nazionale di Monza
- Course length: 10.00 km (6.21 miles)
- Distance: 80 laps, 800 km (496.8 miles)

Pole position
Driver	(Italy) Antonio Ascari	
- Grid positions set by car number

Fastest lap
Driver	(Italy) Antonio Ascari	Alfa Romeo
- Time: 3:43.6

Podium
First	(Italy) Antonio Ascari	Alfa Romeo
Second	(France) Louis Wagner	Alfa Romeo
Third	(Italy) Giuseppe Campari; (Italy) Cesare Pastore	Alfa Romeo

The 1924 Italian Grand Prix was a Grand Prix motor race held at Monza on 19 October 1924. The race was won by Antonio Ascari of Italy, and Alfa Romeo automobiles finished in first, second, third and fourth place. The event was marred by the death of English driver Louis Zborowski, who was killed when he lost control of his Mercedes and the vehicle rolled over twice.

== Classification ==
Pos	No	Driver	Car	Laps	Time/Retired
1	1	(Italy) Antonio Ascari	Alfa Romeo P2 8C/2000	80	5h02m05
2	9	(France) Louis Wagner	Alfa Romeo P2 8C/2000	80	5h18m05
3	5	(Italy) Giuseppe Campari	Alfa Romeo P2 8C/2000	80	5h21m59
3	5	(Italy) Bruno Presenti	Alfa Romeo P2 8C/2000	80	5h21m59
4	11	(Italy) Ferdinando Minoia	Alfa Romeo P2 8C/2000	80	5h22m43
5	3	(France) Jules Goux	Rolland-Pilain Schmid	80	6h10m22
6	7	(Italy) Giulio Foresti	Rolland-Pilain Schmid	80	6h32m03
NC	8	(Italy) "Nino"^{1}	Chiribiri 12/16	70	6h32m30
Ret	2	(Germany) Christian Werner	Mercedes M72/94	68	Withdrawn
Ret	6	(Germany) Alfred Neubauer	Mercedes M72/94	66	Withdrawn
Ret	12	(United Kingdom) Louis Zborowski	Mercedes M72/94	44	Fatal crash at Lesmo/hit tree
Ret	10	(Italy) Giulio Masetti	Mercedes M72/94	43	No fuel
Ret	4	(Italy) Alete Marconcini	Chiribiri 12/16	34	Mechanical

Notes

- ^1 – Nino Cirio raced under the name "Nino".

Grand Prix Race
Previous race: 1924 French Grand Prix	1924 Grand Prix season Grandes Épreuves	Next race: 1925 Indianapolis 500
Previous race: 1923 Italian Grand Prix	Italian Grand Prix	Next race: 1925 Italian Grand Prix
