= Bruno Presenti =

Italian racing driver

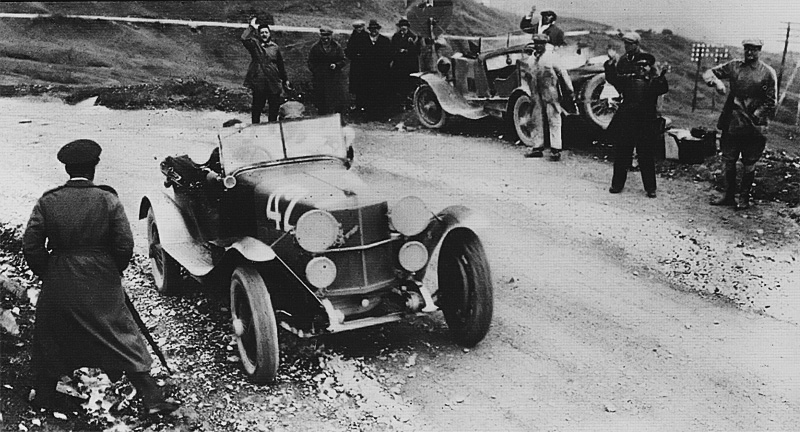
With Brilli-Peri at the 1927 Mille Miglia

Bruno Presenti was an Italian amateur racing driver active in the 1920s.

== Career ==
Presenti's owned an Alfa Romeo dealership in Florence, and occasionally entered Alfa Romeos as a private entrant in races in the 1920s. He was good enough to be invited as a reserve or subordinate driver for the factory team on occasion, and shared Giuseppe Campari's Alfa at the 1924 Italian Grand Prix to a 3rd-place finish. Presenti was also 4th at the Coppa Acerbo in an Alfa Romeo RL the same year, the race being won by Enzo Ferrari. Presenti's most successful performance came in the 1928 Circuito del Mugello, finishing 2nd in an Alfa Romeo 8C, behind Emilio Materassi in a Talbot 700 but ahead of Ferrari's Alfa.

Presenti took part in the Mille Miglia twice, both times in an Alfa Romeo RL, supersport variation; in the first running in 1927, as subordinate driver to Gastone Brilli-Peri, and the pair led before retiring. In 1928 Presenti, this time as senior driver with Carlo Canavesi, finished 8th.
