= Alfa Romeo Tipo A =

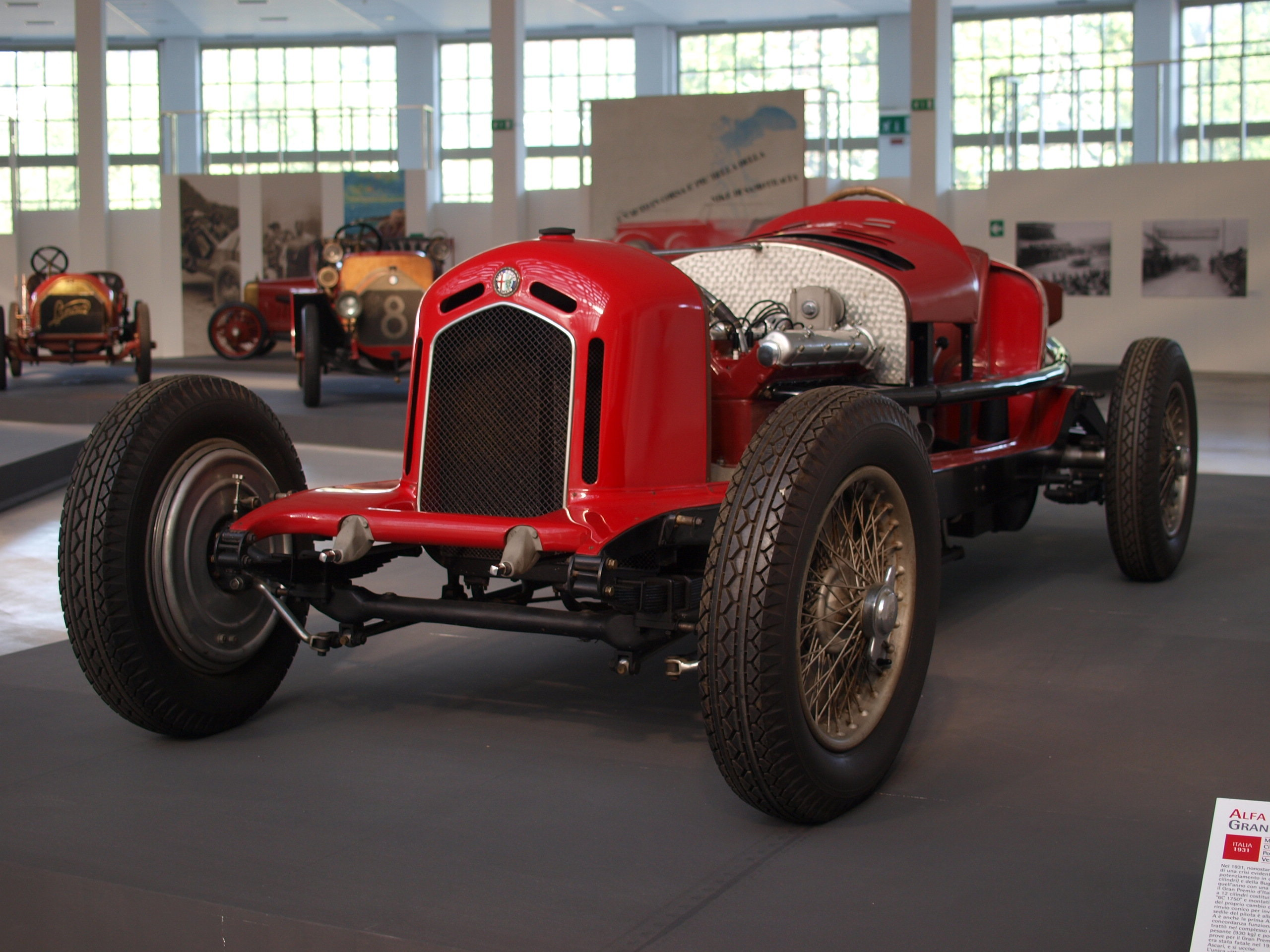
- Alfa Romeo Gran Premio Tipo A 1931

Overview
- Manufacturer: Alfa Romeo
- Production: 1931
- Designer: Vittorio Jano

Body and chassis
- Class: race car
- Body style: single-seater
- Layout: FR layout

Powertrain
- Engine: 2 × 1752 cc I6 DOHC; 230 bhp at 5200 rpm, Memini DOA carburetor and supercharger
- Transmission: 3-speed manual

Dimensions
- Wheelbase: 110 in (2,794 mm)
- Curb weight: 930 kg (2050 lb)

Chronology
- Predecessor: Alfa Romeo P2
- Successor: Alfa Romeo P3

Alfa Romeo Tipo A or Alfa Romeo Tipo A Monoposto was the first monoposto (single-seater) racing car, designed by Alfa Romeo. The car had two 6C 1750 straight-6 engines and gearboxes assembled side by side. Producing 230 bhp (172 kW), the car had top speed of 149 mph (240 km/h).

The car's best racing achievement was in the Coppa Acerbo of 1931; Tazio Nuvolari was third with Giuseppe Campari winning. Luigi Arcangeli was killed at Monza in 1931 while practising with this car for the Italian GP. The car's complex design ultimately led to it being very unreliable; Jano started to design a new car, the Tipo B (P3), to fix this problem. The Tipo A was made in only four examples and only one replica exists today in Alfa Romeo Historical Museum in Arese.

== Technical data ==
Technical data	Alfa Romeo Tipo A
Engine:	Front mounted two 6-cylinder in-line engine
displacement:	2 x 1752 cm^{3} (3504cc)
Bore x stroke:	65 x 88mm
Max power:	115 hp at 5 200 rpm
Valve control:	2 overhead camshafts, 2 valves per cylinder
Compression:	5.0:1
Upload:	Memini-DOA carburettor
Gearbox:	3-speed gearbox, not synchronized (rear-wheel drive)
suspension front:	semi-elliptical leaf springs, friction dampers
suspension rear:	semi-elliptical transverse leaf springs, friction dampers
Brakes:	Drum braken on all wheels
Chassis & body:	Aluminum body on ladder frame
Wheelbase:	280 cm
Dry weight:	930 kg
Top speed:	About 240 km/h

== Complete Results ==
Race	Date	Driver	Entrant	Pos	Time	Fastest Lap
1931 Italian Grand Prix	May 24, 1931	Luigi Arcangeli	Alfa Corse	DNS	Fatal Accident	No
1931 Coppa Acerbo	August 16, 1931	Tazio Nuvolari	Scuderia Ferrari	3	2h25m17.8s	No
1931 Coppa Acerbo	August 16, 1931	Giuseppe Campari	Scuderia Ferrari	1	2h19m42.4s	Yes
1931 Gran Premio di Monza	September 6, 1931	Giuseppe Campari	Alfa Corse	DNS	Withdrawn	No
1931 Gran Premio di Monza	September 6, 1931	Tazio Nuvolari	Alfa Corse	DNF	Piston Issues	No
