= 1925 French Grand Prix =

- Race 3 of 4 in the 1925 World Manufacturers' Championship

Race details
- Date: 26 July 1925
- Official name: XIX Grand Prix de l'Automobile Club de France
- Location: Montlhéry, France
- Course: Autodrome de Linas-Montlhéry
- Course length: 12.500 km (7.767 miles)
- Distance: 80 laps, 1000.0 km (621.4 miles)
- Weather: Overcast.
- Attendance: 50,000

Pole position
Driver	(United Kingdom) Henry Segrave	Sunbeam
- Grid positions set by car number

Fastest lap
Driver	(France) Albert Divo	Sunbeam
- Time: 5:48.0

Podium
First	(France) Robert Benoist; (France) Albert Divo	Delage
Second	(France) Louis Wagner; (France) Paul Torchy	Delage
Third	(Italy) Giulio Masetti	Sunbeam

The 1925 French Grand Prix was a Grand Prix motor race held at Autodrome de Linas-Montlhéry on 26 July 1925. It was the third race of the inaugural AIACR World Manufacturers' Championship. The race, which was 80 laps, was won by Robert Benoist driving a Delage 2LCV after starting from 8th place.

It was the first Grand Prix to take place at the newly built Autodrome de Linas-Montlhéry.

== Background ==
Although the 1925 Grand Prix was held to the same technical regulations as in 1924, with cars allowed a maximum of 2-litre engine capacity, there were several important changes for 1925. For the first time the French Grand Prix was not held on public roads, instead being held at the newly built Autodrome de Linas-Montlhéry which consisted of part of a high banked oval along with an artificial road circuit, a combination initially quite unpopular with the drivers. Also for the first time, riding mechanics were banned although passenger seats were still required.

Another important change for 1925 was the introduction of the World Manufacturers' Championship, held over four races in 1925, the French Grand Prix being the third. Although World Championship regulations required a minimum race distance of 800km (the distance used for the French Grand Prix each year since 1922) it was decided to run the 1925 edition over the longer distance of 1000km.

== Entries ==
After a fairly large entry in 1924, there were just 17 cars entered in 1925. Winners in 1924 and in the previous World Championship event, the European Grand Prix, Alfa Romeo were considered to be pre-race favourites with their P2s to be driven by the well established European Grand Prix winner Antonio Ascari and 1925 winner Giuseppe Campari, as well as the then nearly unknown Gastone Brilli-Peri. French hopes mainly rested on Delage, hoping to make up for their disappointment in Belgium, with four of their now supercharged V12 cars entered to be driven by Robert Benoist, Albert Divo and Louis Wagner, with the fourth car for Paul Torchy withdrawn. Bugatti entered a total of five cars, all T35s. Three were works cars for Jules Goux, Meo Costantini and Pierre de Vizcaya, while Giulio Foresti and Ferdinand de Vizcaya were entered in their own cars.

1923 winners Sunbeam entered three of their 1924 cars including one for 1923 winner Henry Segrave. Parry Thomas' entry was taken over by the non-starting 1.5 litre Eldridge Special. Also entered but not arriving was a Mathis.

All starters were fitted with superchargers except for the five Bugattis. Ettore Bugatti felt the technology was still too unreliable, and although the Bugattis were slower than their competitors, all five Bugattis went on to finish the race.

No.	Driver	Entrant	Car
1	(United Kingdom) Henry Segrave	Sunbeam Motor Car Company	Sunbeam
2	(United Kingdom) John Godfrey Parry-Thomas	J. G. Parry Thomas	Thomas
3	(Italy) Giuseppe Campari	SA Ital. Ing. Nicola Romeo	Alfa Romeo P2
4	(France) François de Brémont	SA Mathis	Mathis
5	(Spain) Pierre de Vizcaya	Automobiles Ettore Bugatti	Bugatti T35
6	(France) Albert Divo	Automobiles Delage	Delage
7	(Italy) Giulio Masetti	Sunbeam Motor Car Company	Sunbeam
8	(Italy) Antonio Ascari	SA Ital. Ing. Nicola Romeo	Alfa Romeo P2
9	(France) Jules Goux	Automobiles Ettore Bugatti	Bugatti T35
10	(France) Robert Benoist	Automobiles Delage	Delage
11	(Italy) Caberto Conelli	Sunbeam Motor Car Company	Sunbeam
12	(Italy) Gastone Brilli-Peri	SA Ital. Ing. Nicola Romeo	Alfa Romeo P2
13	(Italy) Meo Costantini	Automobiles Ettore Bugatti	Bugatti T35
14	(France) Louis Wagner	Automobiles Delage	Delage 2LCV
15	(Spain) Ferdinand de Vizcaya	Automobiles Ettore Bugatti	Bugatti T35
16	(France) Paul Torchy	Automobiles Delage	Delage 2LCV
17	(Italy) Giulio Foresti	Automobiles Ettore Bugatti	Bugatti T35

== Starting grid ==
The starting grid was determined by ballot and was reduced to 14 cars following some withdrawals. The cars were lined up in rows of three, with pole on the right. The race started with a rolling start.

Pos.	Driver	Entrant	Car
1	(United Kingdom) Henry Segrave	Sunbeam Motor Car Company	Sunbeam
2	(Italy) Giuseppe Campari	SA Ital. Ing. Nicola Romeo	Alfa Romeo P2
3	(Spain) Pierre de Vizcaya	Automobiles Ettore Bugatti	Bugatti T35
4	(France) Albert Divo	Automobiles Delage	Delage
5	(Italy) Giulio Masetti	Sunbeam Motor Car Company	Sunbeam
6	(Italy) Antonio Ascari	SA Ital. Ing. Nicola Romeo	Alfa Romeo P2
7	(France) Jules Goux	Automobiles Ettore Bugatti	Bugatti T35
8	(France) Robert Benoist	Automobiles Delage	Delage
9	(Italy) Caberto Conelli	Sunbeam Motor Car Company	Sunbeam
10	(Italy) Gastone Brilli-Peri	SA Ital. Ing. Nicola Romeo	Alfa Romeo P2
11	(Italy) Meo Costantini	Automobiles Ettore Bugatti	Bugatti T35
12	(France) Louis Wagner	Automobiles Delage	Delage 2LCV
13	(Spain) Ferdinand de Vizcaya	Automobiles Ettore Bugatti	Bugatti T35
14	(Italy) Giulio Foresti	Automobiles Ettore Bugatti	Bugatti T35

== Race ==
=== Report ===
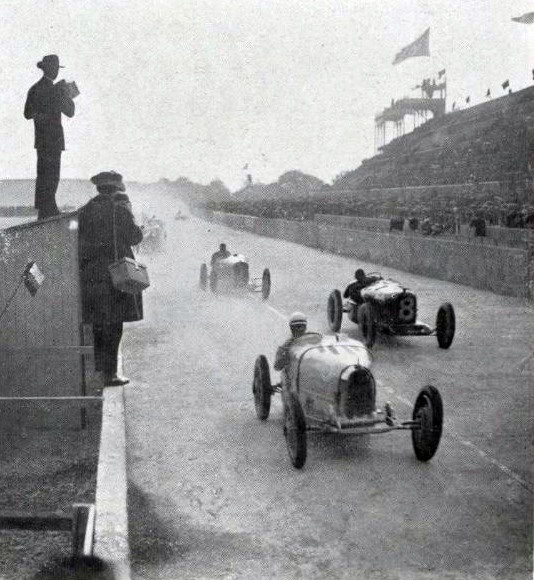
Start of the race.

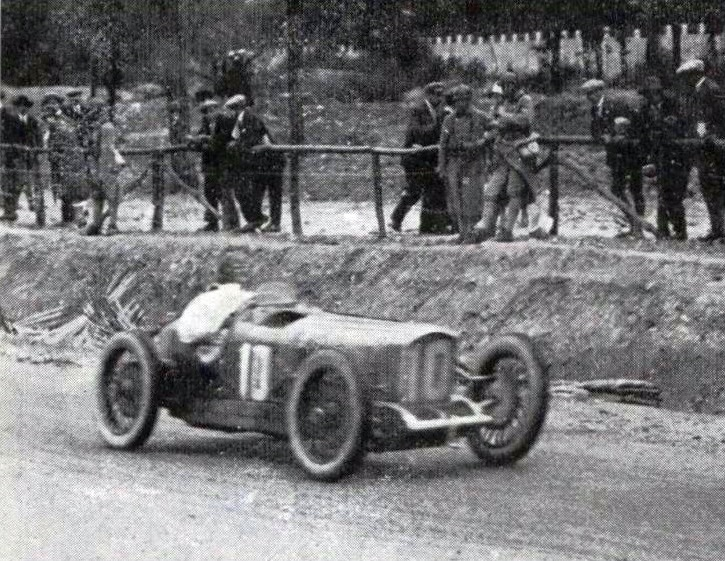
Winner Robert Benoist in his Delage during the race.

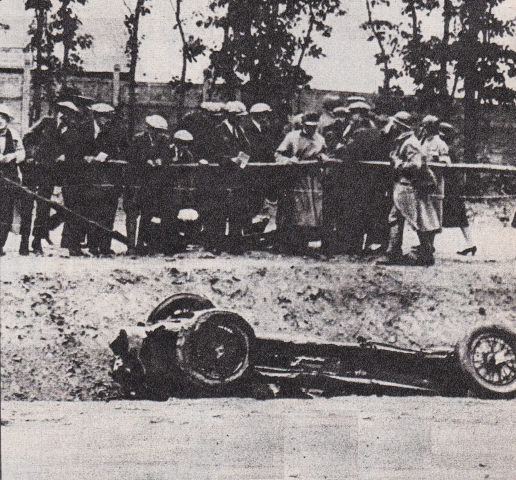
The race was marred by the fatal crash of famous Italian driver Antonio Ascari, driving for Alfa Romeo. His son Alberto would go on to be Formula One world champion in the 1950s.

The race began with a rolling start, with the field led by two pilot cars. However, the start was a mess due to the slow speed of the pilot cars. From the start, Ascari took the lead from the second row, followed by Divo and Segrave. By the end of the first lap, Ascari had pulled a sizable lead from Divo, with Masetti, Wagner and Campari passed Segrave, who was followed by Brilli-Peri, Benoist and Conelli. The five Bugattis already some way behind.

On the second lap, Campari moved up to second and the two Alfa Romeos started to pull away from the rest of the field. Divo dropped back, stopping for plugs. Brilli-Peri overtook Wagner putting him into third, but was retaken on lap 3 dropping him to fourth ahead of Masetti in the best placed Sunbeam. At the end of the fifth lap, however, Brilli-Peri pitted, also for plugs. Both Divo and Brilli-Peri pitted again several times, Divo retiring after 7 laps, and Brilli-Peri continuing on but several laps down.

Around the eleventh lap, the two leading Alfa Romeos continued to pull away, aided by third placed Wagner experiencing a misfiring engine, dropping him back several places, and Ascari setting the then record fastest lap on lap 11 in 5 minutes 49 seconds. Benoist, who had been sitting in fifth place prior to Wagner's issues then began moving up the field, moving past the Sunbeam of Masetti into third place on the 18th lap. Shortly after the leading Alfa Romeos made their first pit stops, with Ascari getting away without losing his lead, but a slower stop by Campari dropped him to third behind Benoist, who he would retake shortly after.

Shortly after this, came tragedy: light rain had started to fall and Ascari misjudged the fast left hand corner on the return leg of the lap, brushing the fence on the inside causing the car to turn over, throwing him out then crushing him. He would later die in the ambulance on his way to hospital.

Benoist, now lying second, made his first pitstop at the end of lap 29, losing second place in the process to Masetti and handing over his car to Divo who had long since retired his car. Divo pushed hard in an effort to catch up to Campari, retaking second place from Masetti (soon to be the last remaining Sunbeam with Conelli having retired around the same time as Ascari's accident, and Segrave soon to retire with engine trouble). In his efforts to catch Campari, Divo set the fastest lap of 5 minutes 48 seconds, but this was ultimately not necessary; with the news of Ascari's death it was decided to withdraw the remaining Alfa Romeos, with Campari coming in from the lead and Brilli-Peri still some laps behind. This left Divo well in the lead from Masetti and Constantini in the fastest of the Bugattis, followed closely by Torchy, now driving Wagner's Delage.

Torchy continued to push in spite of the increasingly wet weather, passing Constantini just a lap after Campari was withdrawn, and finally passing Masetti's Sunbeam with 10 laps to go. Divo handed the lead Delage back to Benoist at the last stop, allowing him to take the win from Wagner and Torchy, and Masetti in third, followed at some distance by all five Bugattis, the last of which, Foresti, over an hour behind.

After the race and presentation ceremony, Benoist took the flowers he had been presented as the winner and drove his car to the corner where Ascari had lost his life, placing them there as a gesture to the fallen driver.

=== Results ===
Pos	No	Driver	Car	Laps	Time/Retired
1	10	(France) Robert Benoist (France) Albert Divo	Delage 2LCV	80	8h54m41.2
2	14	(France) Louis Wagner (France) Paul Torchy	Delage 2LCV	80	9h02m27.4
3	7	(Italy) Giulio Masetti	Sunbeam	80	9h06m15.2
4	13	(Italy) Meo Costantini	Bugatti T35	80	9h07m38.4
5	9	(France) Jules Goux	Bugatti T35	80	9h15m11.2
6	15	(Spain) Ferdinand de Vizcaya	Bugatti T35	80	9h20m48.4
7	5	(Spain) Pierre de Vizcaya	Bugatti T35	80	9h41m01.6
8	17	(Italy) Giulio Foresti	Bugatti T35	80	9h49m38.6
Ret	3	(Italy) Giuseppe Campari	Alfa Romeo P2	40	Withdrawn
Ret	1	(United Kingdom) Henry Segrave	Sunbeam	31	Engine
Ret	12	(Italy) Gastone Brilli-Peri	Alfa Romeo P2	31	Withdrawn
Ret	11	(Italy) Caberto Conelli	Sunbeam	22	Brakes
Ret	8	(Italy) Antonio Ascari	Alfa Romeo P2	22	Fatal crash
Ret	6	(France) Albert Divo	Delage 2LCV	7	Supercharger
DNA	2	(United Kingdom) Ernest Eldridge	Eldrige Special		Car not ready
DNA	4	(France) De Bremond	Mathis		
DNA	16	(France) Paul Torchy	Delage 2LCV		

Grand Prix Race
Previous race: 1925 Belgian Grand Prix	1925 Grand Prix season Grandes Épreuves	Next race: 1925 Italian Grand Prix
Previous race: 1924 French Grand Prix	French Grand Prix	Next race: 1926 French Grand Prix
