= Alfa Romeo P1 =

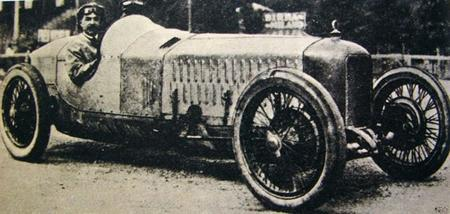

Overview
- Manufacturer: Alfa Romeo
- Production: 1923–1924
- Designer: Giuseppe Merosi

Body and chassis
- Class: race car
- Body style: 2-seater
- Layout: FR layout

Powertrain
- Engine: 1990 cc I6 DOHC; 95 bhp @ 5000 rpm (1923); 115 bhp @ 5000 rpm (1924)

Dimensions
- Curb weight: 850 kg (1,874 lb)

Chronology
- Successor: Alfa Romeo P2

Alfa Romeo P1 or Alfa Romeo Tipo P1 was the first Grand Prix car made by Alfa Romeo. Produced in 1923, the car had a 2.0 L straight-6 engine and it produced 95 bhp (71 kW) at 5000 rpms. The bore and stroke were 65mm and 100mm, respectively. Three cars were entered in the Italian GP at Monza in 1923, for Antonio Ascari, Giuseppe Campari and Ugo Sivocci. When Sivocci was practicing for the GP in September 1923 he crashed and was killed. Alfa Romeo withdrew from the competition and development of the car was stopped. In 1924 a new version with Roots-compressor was made and became the P1 Compressore 1924.

In 1923 Vittorio Jano was hired to Alfa Romeo to design new car and P2 was born.
