= Torchy =

Torchy can refer to:

== People ==
=== Nickname ===
- Torchy Atkinson (1909-1990), New Zealand horticultural scientist and scientific administrator
- Torchy Clark, American basketball head coach for the University of Central Florida (1969-1983)
- Roy Hasson (1921-1968), Australian rugby league footballer of the 1940s
- Judith Krantz (born 1928), American romance novelist
- William Peden (1906-1980), Canadian Hall-of-Fame cyclist

=== Surname ===
- Paul Torchy, a competitor in the inaugural 1923 24 Hours of Le Mans, the 1925 French Grand Prix and the 1925 Belgian Grand Prix

== Arts and entertainment ==
- Torchy Blane, a female reporter character in late 1930s films
- the title character of Jackie Ormes' 1938-1939 comic strip Torchy Brown in Dixie to Harlem
- Torchy Todd, heroine of Torchy (comics), a comic strip and comic book begun in 1944
- the title character of Torchy the Battery Boy, a 1958-1959 puppet television series
- Torchy, a fire-breathing Dimetrodon from the third season of Land of the Lost
- Torchy, a character played by Johnny Hines in a series of film shorts (1920-1922)
- Torchy (album), a 1955 album by jazz singer Carmen McRae
