= Ugo Sivocci =

Italian racing driver (1885–1923)

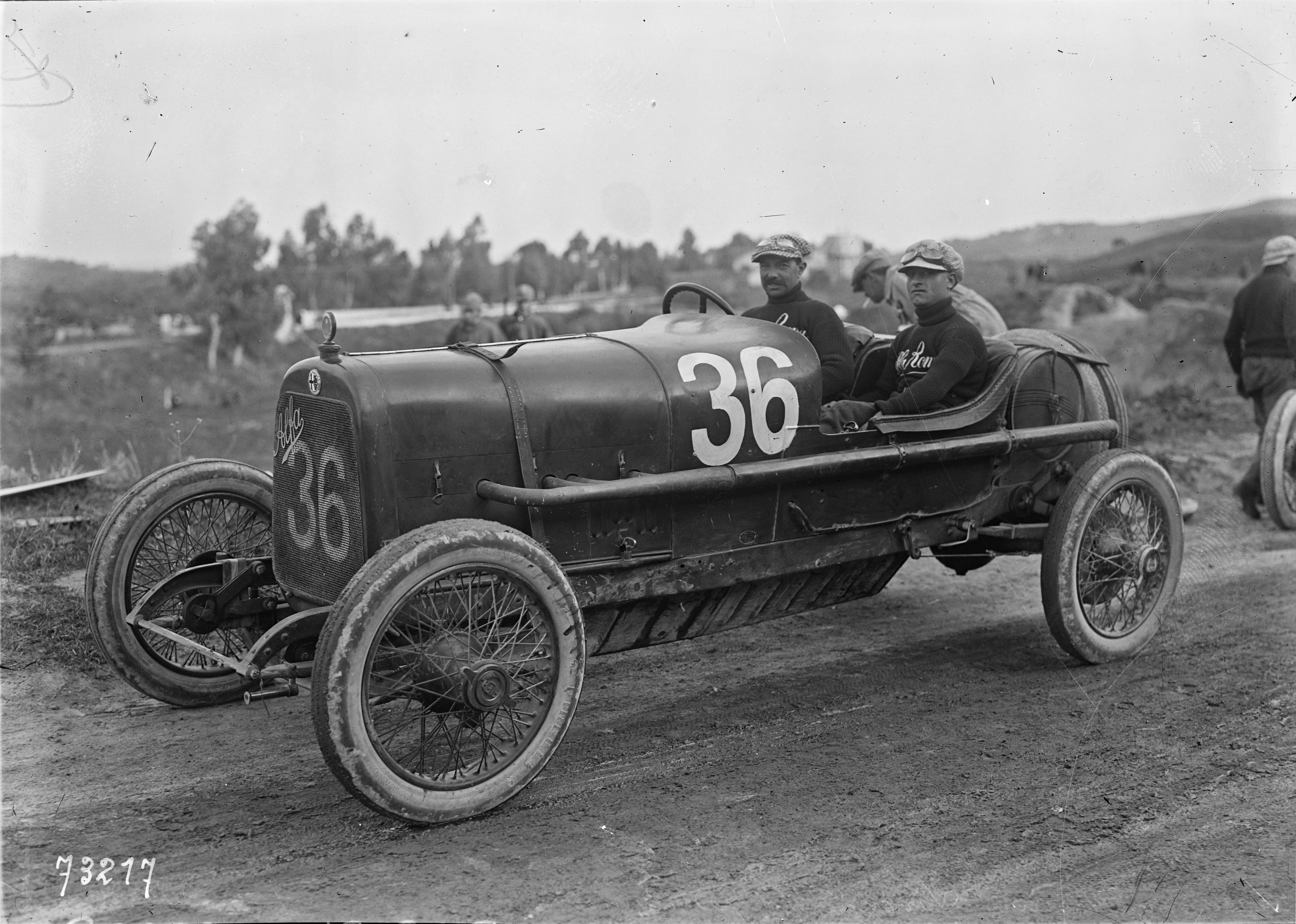
Ugo Sivocci in his Alfa Romeo 20-30 ES at the 1922 Targa Florio

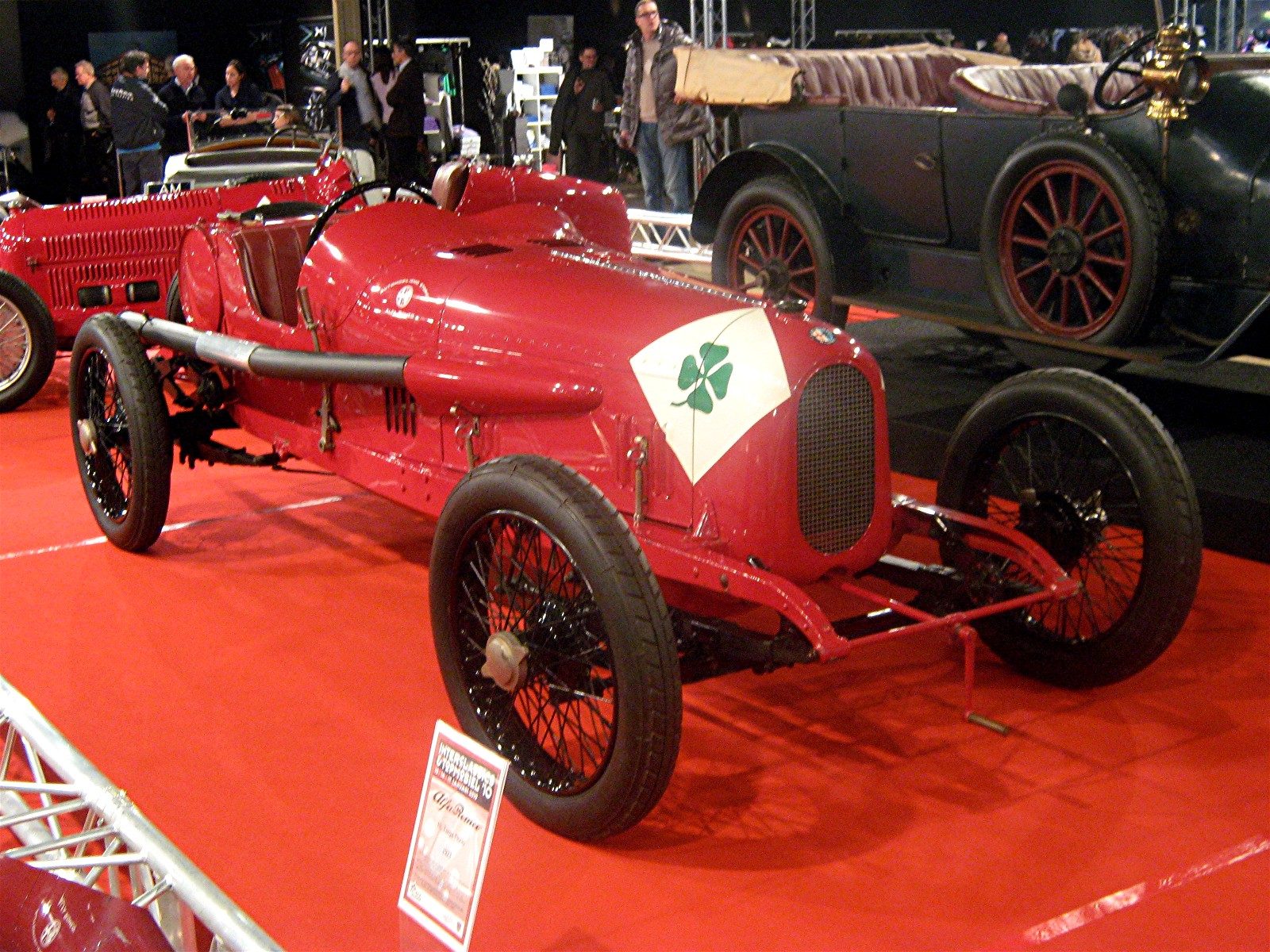
Quadrifoglio Verde (Green cloverleaf) has been used on Alfa Romeo racing cars since Ugo Sivocci's 1923 Targa Florio entry in Alfa Romeo RL. Originally the white background was a square but after the death of Sivocci was modified to a triangle.

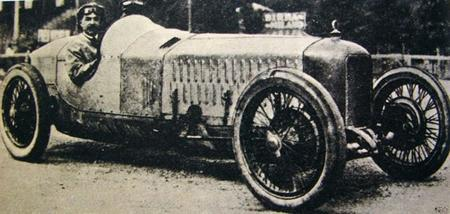
Ugo Sivocci at the wheel of 1923 Alfa Romeo P1

Ugo Sivocci (August 29, 1885 - September 8, 1923) was an Italian racing driver.

Born in Salerno, Sivocci started his racing career as one of the pioneers of Italian bicycle racing, obtaining a second place in the 600 km long classic Corsa Nazionale. After World War I, he worked as an auto mechanic in Milan. Being a friend of Enzo Ferrari, he was hired by Alfa Romeo in 1920 to drive Alfa in three-man works team: (Alfa Corse) with Antonio Ascari and Enzo Ferrari. With the HP 20-30 ES Sport he finished 2nd in the Parma - Poggio Berceto race. In 1923 he began to drive the Alfa Romeo RL, and quickly won numerous races. In the same year, he won the Targa Florio with RL Targa Florio which was his major racing achievement. The race was a great success for Alfa Romeo as second (Ascari) and fourth places (Giulio Masetti) were occupied by Alfa. Sivocci's car was painted with the green cloverleaf on a white background that was to become Alfa's good luck token.

In the same year Sivocci was killed while testing Merosi's new P1 at Monza. On the same day of the accident, a press release of the engineer Nicola Romeo announced the withdrawal of other Alfa Romeo cars competing.

His car was carrying number 17, which was never again assigned to Italian racing cars.

== Major results ==
- Parma - Poggio Berceto race 1921, 2nd
- Circuit of Mugello 1921, 4th
- Targa Florio 1922, 9th
- Targa Florio 1923, 1st

== Major cycling results ==
- Corsa Nazionale 1902, 12th
- Corsa Nazionale 1904, 2nd
