= Paul Torchy =

French racing driver (1896–1979)

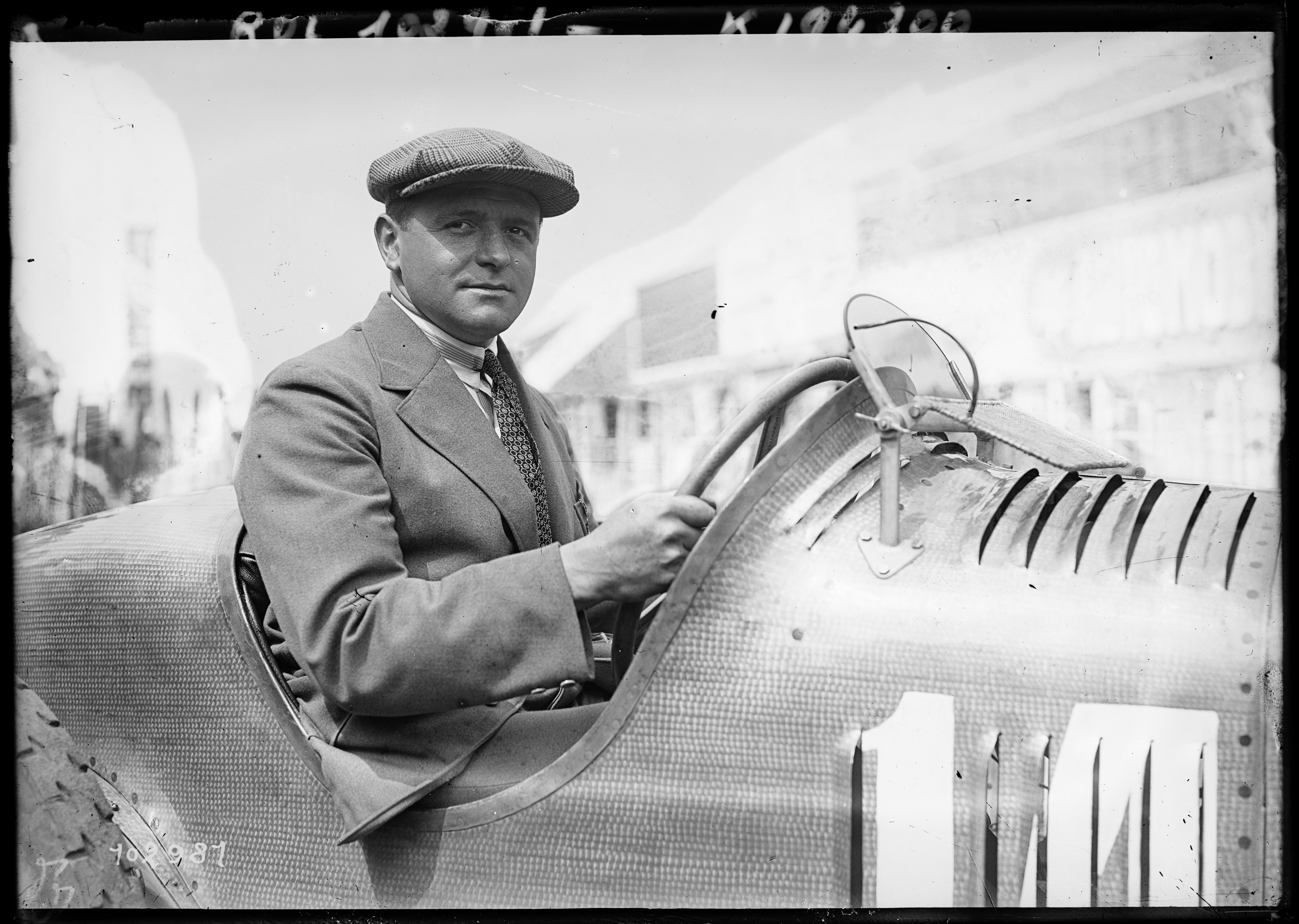
- Torchy on his Delage at the 1925 French GP
- Born: Paul Gaston Torchy; 22 February 1897 Vibeuf, Seine-Maritime, France
- Died: 19 September 1925 (aged 28) San Sebastian, Spain

Paul Gaston Torchy (21 February 1897 – 19 September 1925) was a French racing driver.

== Career ==
The son of a schoolmaster, Torchy was awarded the Croix de Guerre in 1917 for leading a platoon under fire.

After the war, Torchy joined Delage, working his way from mechanic to test driver, and entered an 11HP model for the first Le Mans 24 Hours in 1923, finishing 6th in class (and 12th overall) with Charles Belben as co-driver.

In 1925, Torchy was promoted to the Delage Grand Prix team, his debut at the Belgian Grand Prix being abortive as he was an early retirement. At the following French Grand Prix, he shared the Delage of the experienced Louis Wagner, taking the wheel from lap 33 to 59, the pair finishing 2nd - albeit only after the dominant Alfa Romeos had withdrawn after the death of race leader Antonio Ascari.

== Death ==
On the fifth lap of the 1925 San Sebastian Grand Prix, on the Lasarte road circuit, Torchy crashed his Delage on the approach to the Lasarte bend, around the Alto de Teresategui, and he died en route to hospital from a fractured skull. Torchy's car was numbered 13, and after team-mate Count Giulio Masetti was killed with the same number at the 1926 Targa Florio, the Automobile Club de France stopped allocating it at its races.
