= Weber Carburetors =

Automotive manufacturing company

Weber
- Industry: Automotive industry
- Founded: 1923
- Headquarters: Italy
- Area served: Worldwide

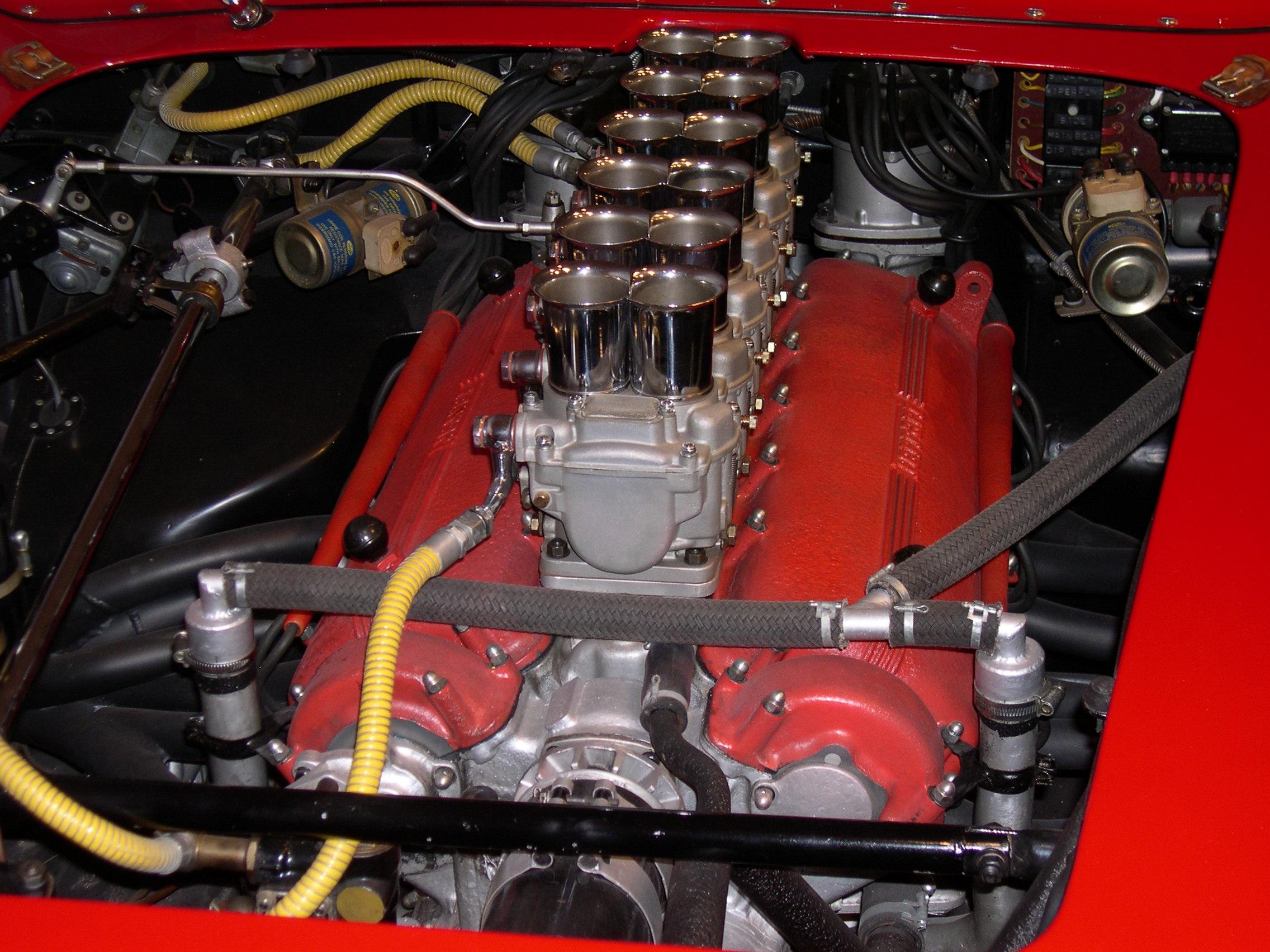
1961 Ferrari 250TR Spider engine fitted with six Weber two-barrel downdraft carburetors.

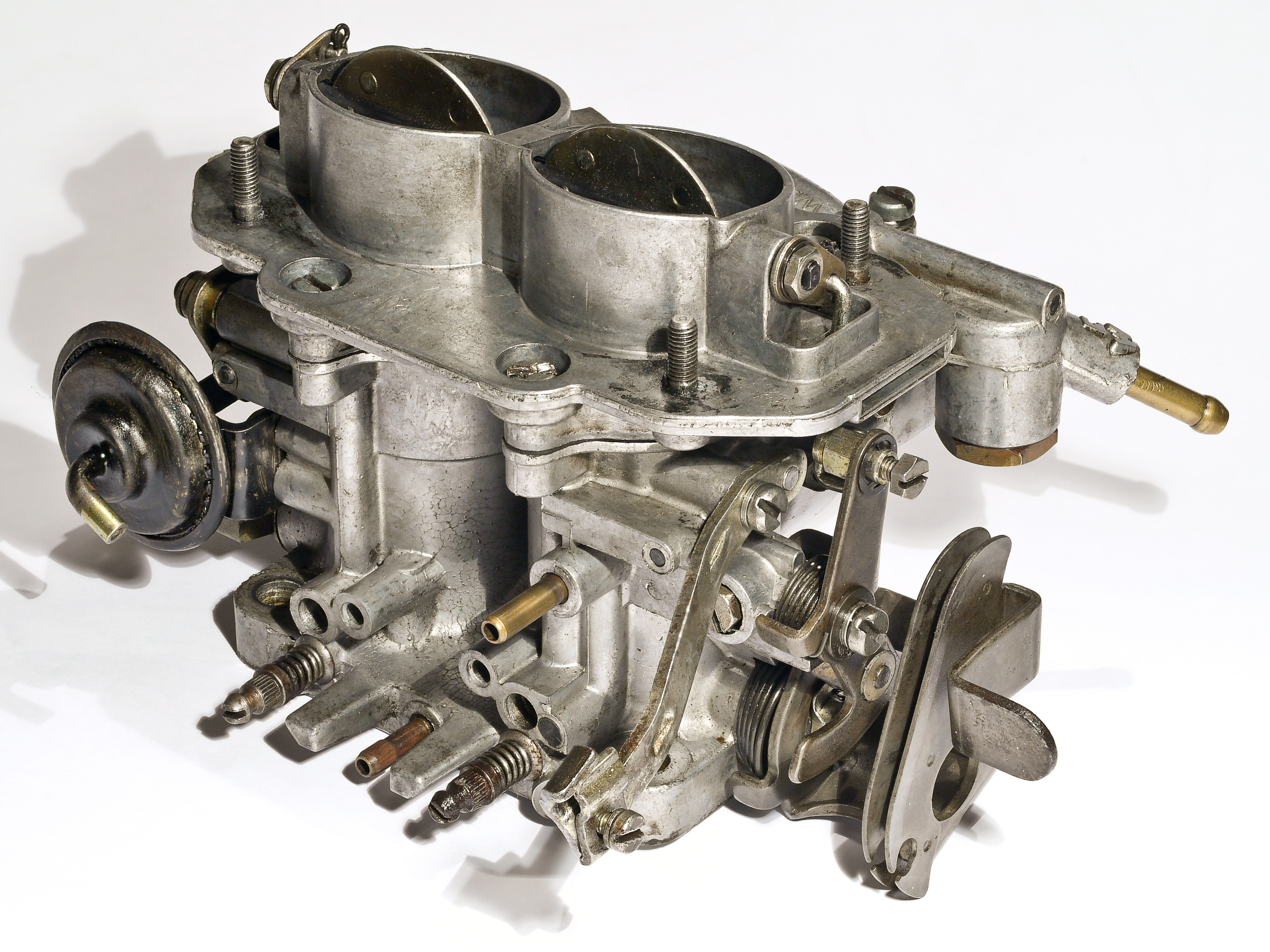
Weber 36 DCNVA from a Matra Murena.

Weber Carburetors is an automotive manufacturing company founded in 1923, known for their carburetors.

== History ==
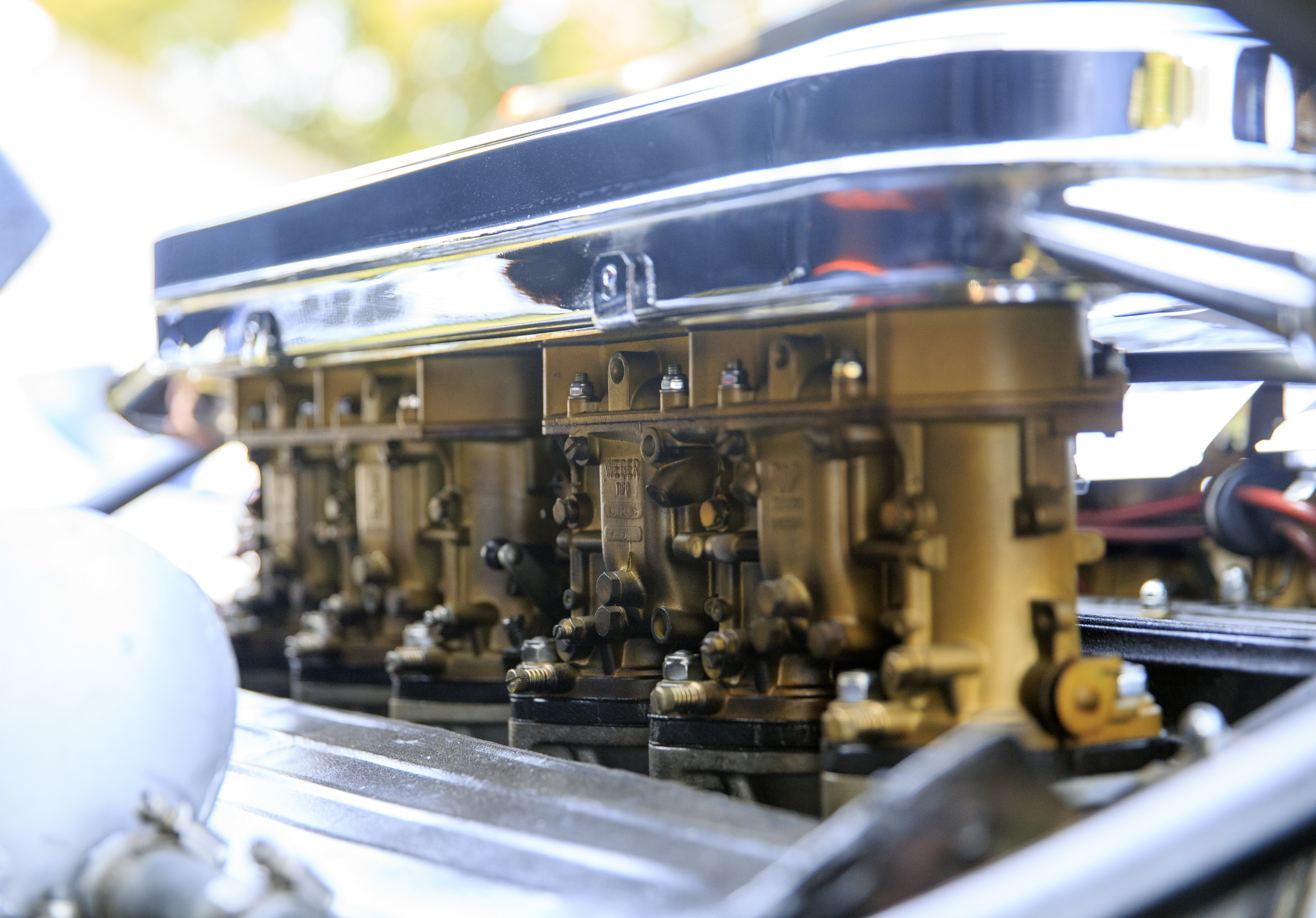
Two of the four triple-choke Weber 40 IDL 3L carburetors on the V12 engine of a Lamborghini Miura 400 S

Edoardo Weber began his automotive career working for Fiat, first at their Turin plant (in 1914) and later at a dealership in Bologna. After WWI, with gasoline prices high, he reached a certain success in selling conversion kits for running trucks on kerosene instead. The company was established as Fabbrica Italiana Carburatori Weber in 1923 when Weber produced carburetors as part of a conversion kit for Fiats. Weber pioneered the use of two-stage twin-barrel carburetors, with two venturis of different sizes (the smaller one for low-speed/rpm running and the larger one optimised for high-speed/rpm use).

In the 1930s, Weber began producing twin-barrel carburetors for motor racing, where two barrels of the same size were used. These were arranged so that each cylinder of the engine had its own carburetor barrel. These carburetors found use in Maserati and Alfa Romeo racing cars. Twin updraft Weber carburetors fed superchargers on the 1938 Alfa Romeo 8C competition vehicles.

Fiat bought the company in 1952 following Weber's disappearance and probable death in 1945. In time, Weber carburetors were fitted to standard production cars and factory racing applications from automotive marques such as Abarth, Alfa Romeo, Aston Martin, BMW, Chrysler, Ferrari, Fiat, Ford, IKA, Lamborghini, Lancia, Lotus, Maserati, Morgan, Porsche, Renault, Triumph and Volkswagen.

In 1986, Fiat also took control of Weber competitor Solex, and merged the two into a single company (Raggruppamento Controllo Motore, or the "Engine Management Group"). This was then reorganized as Magneti Marelli Powertrain S.p.A. in 1986. Genuine Weber carburetors were produced in Bologna, Italy, up until 1992, when production was transferred to Madrid, Spain, where they continue to be made today. Weber carburetors are made in a facility owned by LCN Automotive based in Spain. There are only two direct distributors of Spanish Weber carburetors: Webcon based in the UK, and WorldPac (known as RedlineWeber) in the US. Webcon operates a global distribution chain via a long established network of dealers and specialists, many of whom are located in the EU.

== Modern use ==
In modern times, fuel injection has replaced carburetors in both production cars and most modern motor racing, although Weber carburetors are still used extensively in classic and historic racing. They are also supplied as high-quality replacements for problematic OEM carburetors. Weber fuel system components are distributed by Magneti Marelli, Webcon UK Ltd., and, in North America, by several organizations, including Worldpac, marketing under the Redline name. Other suppliers include Overseas Distributing, Pierce Manifolds & Lynx Weber in Australia.

Weber carburetors are made for street and off-road use, with the twin-choke sidedraft DCOE (Doppio Corpo Orizzontale E; "Double-Body Horizontal E") being the most common one. They are sold in what is referred to as a Weber conversion kit. A Weber conversion kit is a complete upgrade package consisting of a Weber carburetor, intake manifold or manifold adapter, throttle linkage, air filter, and all of the hardware needed for installation on a vehicle.

== Model codes ==
Weber carburetors are marked with a model code on the mounting flange, the body, or on the cover of the float chamber. This begins with a number which originally indicated the diameter (in millimetres) of the throttle bore, but later lost this significance. If this number has a single pair of digits, both chokes are of the same diameter and operate together; if it has two pairs of digits separated by a stroke (e.g. 28/36), there are primary and secondary chokes that are opened one after the other, usually of differing diameter.

These numbers are followed by a group of letters, which indicate various features: the DCOE is a sidedraft unit, all others being downdraft; the DCD has a piston-type starter valve as opposed to a strangler choke; and so on. After the letters there will be a further number, which may be followed by a letter, e.g. 4B, 13A; these indicate the series, which in turn almost always indicates the original equipment fitment of the product. The full designation might be 40 DCOE 29, 45 DCOE 9, etc.

== Copies ==
Copies of DCOE, IDF, IDA or DGV carburetors can be found made by other companies, like EMPI, FAJS or REEDMORAL, LOREADA, often at up to half the price of the authentic Spanish Weber versions. Often these are referred to as Knock offs, Clones or 'fakes' by Weber users. Most of these copies are manufactured in China, and being direct copies means that parts are at least meant to be interchangeable. Operation however, usually varies from the original, due to inaccurate drilling and poorly calibrated parts and use of different quality materials. If there is a problem arising from a poorly prepared carb, it is often most noticeable during idle or cruise. Interchangeability works in both directions, as internal parts may also be swapped for original ones. Webcon has some handy downloads to help tell genuine Webers from fake Fake Weber 1 Fake Weber 2

== Setting ==
Proper carburetor jetting is based on engine displacement, RPM and engine usage. Either one or more carburetors connected to each other are used. For small engines, even only one half of the carburetor was used, with the other half blinded and partially cut off. The basic carburetor size can be selected by the butterfly valves, for DCO/DCOE the sizes are 38/40/42/45/48/50/55, with 40/45/48/50/55 being more common and available today. Jet size is based on choke size, and choke size is just based on engine displacement, RPM and application. Today you can simplify the calculation work and use an online jetting calculator or go through the jetting tables and match your case.

== See also ==
- List of Italian companies
