= Edoardo Weber =

Italian automotive engineer (1889–1945)

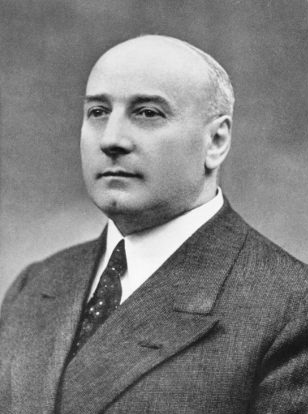
- Weber c. 1940
- Born: 29 November 1889; Turin, Kingdom of Italy
- Died: 17 May 1945 (aged 55); Bologna, Kingdom Italy
- Education: University of Turin
- Occupations: Engineer; businessman
- Known for: Weber Carburetors

Edoardo Weber (29 November 1889 – 17 May 1945) was a Swiss-Italian engineer and businessman, famous for creating Weber Carburetors.

== Life and work ==
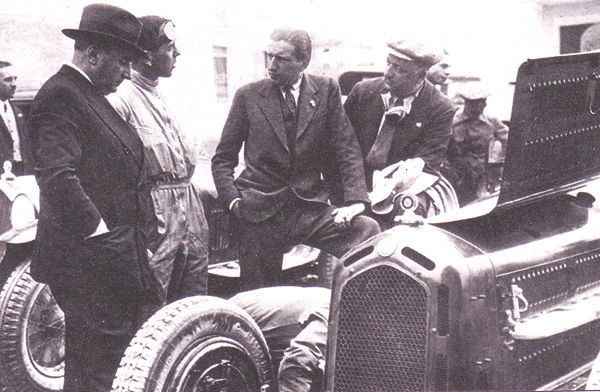
Edoardo Weber at far left (around 1933). The others are (from left): Giulio Ramponi, Carlo Felice Trossi and Enzo Ferrari of the Scuderia Ferrari team. The car is an Alfa Romeo 8C "Monza".

He was born in Turin to a Swiss father and a Jewish mother from Piedmont. After graduating in mechanical engineering from the University of Turin (1913), he moved to Bologna to work for the local branch of Fiat. He was a mentor to Amédée Gordini. During this time, he also ventured into competitive driving. He drove a Fiat 501 to third place in the race on 13 June 1920 at Mugello.

Weber's work to provide some remedy for high gasoline prices resulted in the first Weber carburetor, a "sidedraft, twin-choke ... bolted to a Weber designed overhead-valve/supercharger conversion for the 501 Fiat". In 1923, he established the Fabbrica Italiana Carburatori Weber company, which, under his leadership, became a supplier to Fiat for mass-produced cars, as well as smaller-volume Alfa Romeo and Maserati racing cars.

Weber was a member of the Italian Fascist Party. In 1937, he received the Order of the Crown of Italy and, in 1943, the Order of Merit for Labour.

At the end of the Italian Civil War, Bologna was liberated on April 21 of 1945 by the Italian Co-belligerent Army. Three weeks later, early in the morning on May 17, 1945, Weber was picked up by a group of civilians from his factory office at Via del Timavo 18. He was never seen again, presumably executed by the Italian resistance movement.

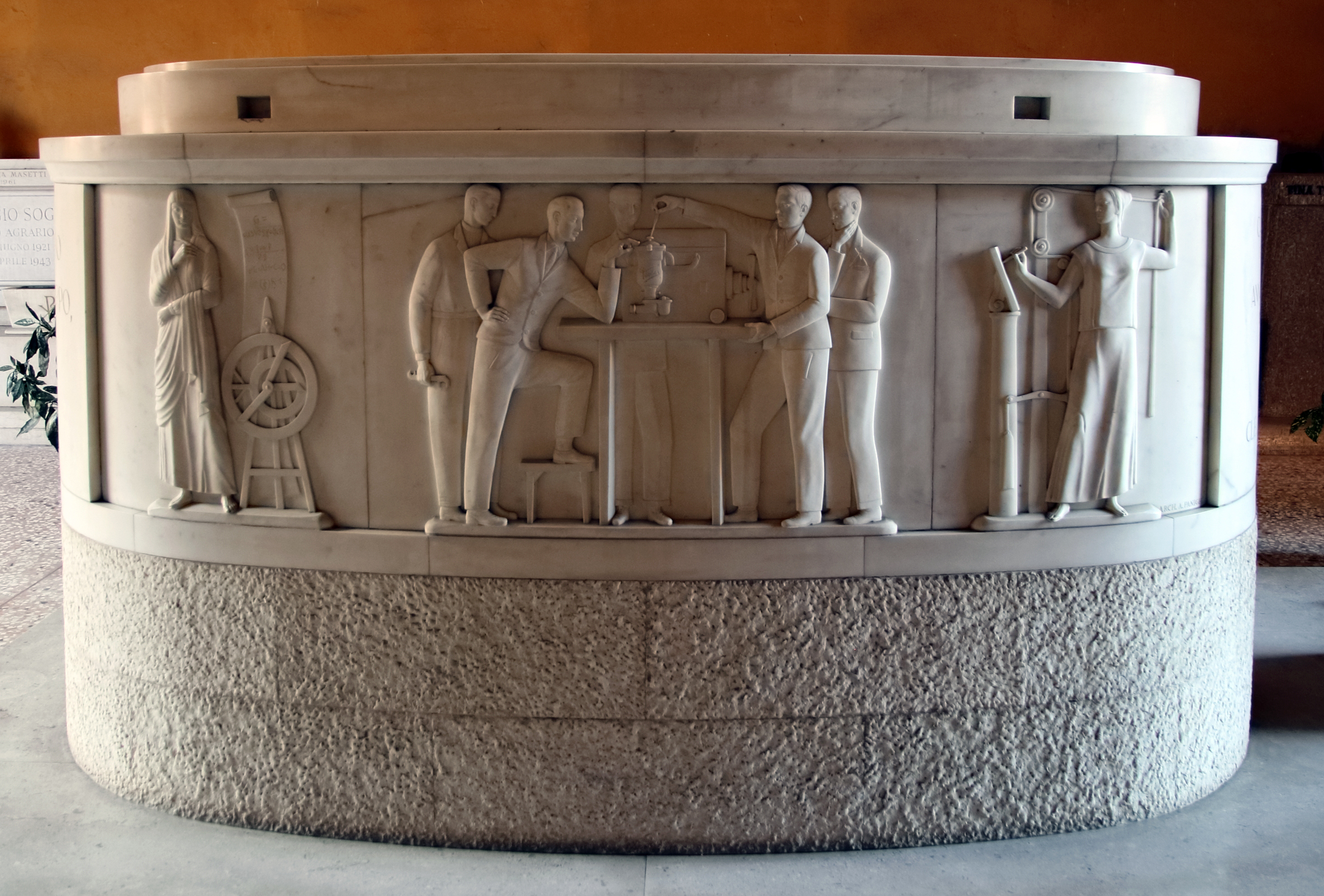
Weber's tomb, located in the monumental hall of the Certosa di Bologna cemetery

Following Weber's disappearance, his family sold the company to Fiat in 1952.

In the Certosa di Bologna there is an empty grave with his name written "Edoardo Weber". His widow Anna (1897–1985) wrote a biography in 1972.

== Bibliography ==
- Anna Weber Bolelli, Edoardo Weber, Accorsi, Bologna, 1972.
