= Antonio Ascari =

Italian racing driver (1888–1925)

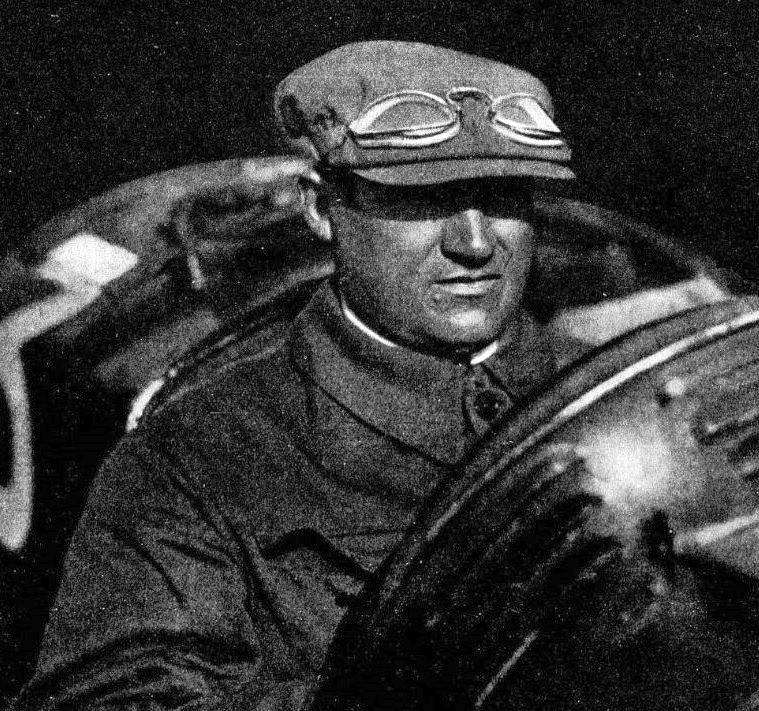
- Antonio in an Alfa Romeo P2 in 1925
- Born: 15 September 1888; Bonferraro, Italy
- Died: 26 July 1925 (aged 36); Paris, France
- Occupation: Racing driver
- Children: Alberto Ascari

Antonio Ascari (15 September 1888 – 26 July 1925) was an Italian Grand Prix motor racing champion. He won four Grands Prix before his premature death at the 1925 French Grand Prix. He was the father of two-time World Champion Alberto Ascari.

== Early life ==
Ascari was born at Bonferraro Di Sorgà, near Mantua but in the Veneto region of Italy, as the son of a wheat salesman. He left school early and worked for some time in a blacksmith's forge. After moving to Milan with his family, he worked as a mechanic with car manufacturers Di Vecchi; while there he was given his first drive at a touring car event in Modena in 1911. he spent the First World War servicing aircraft. When the war ended he set up an Alfa Romeo dealership in Milan.

== Career ==
He began racing cars at the top level in 1919. When Fiat withdrew from the Parma–Poggio di Berceto hillclimb that year, he bought one of their cars, a Fiat Grand Prix 4500, entered the competition (which was also the debut race for Enzo Ferrari), and won. He followed it up with a win in the Consuma hillclimb. He drove the same car in the 1919 Targa Florio, and was performing well until he skidded off the racetrack into a deep ravine; despite this, his bosses took note of his talent and recruited him into the Alfa Romeo team. The company also granted him the concession for the whole of Lombardy. As well as sales, he had a role in development, and was involved in the production of the Alfa Romeo ES Sport. He raced for Alfa Romeo in the 1920 and 1921 Targa Florio, without great success, but in 1922 he finished fourth. He was leading the 1923 race when his car broke down just short of the finish line. He got it going again, but his teammate, Ugo Sivocci, passed him to win the race, with Ascari finishing second. A month later, at the Cremona Circuit, he drove to his first major Grand Prix victory, driving an Alfa Romeo RL TF. He entered the 1923 Italian Grand Prix, where he was to drive the new P1 car, but the team withdrew from the race after Sivocci was killed during practice.

In 1924, Ascari was again the winner at Cremona, in the first race of the new P2, designed by Vittorio Jano. He suffered frustration again in the 1924 Targa Florio when his car failed within a few hundred yards of victory; Ascari, his mechanic, Giulio Ramponi, and some spectators pushed the car over the line but he was disqualified for receiving outside assistance. He suffered a similar fate in the French Grand Prix, then went on to Monza where he won the Italian Grand Prix, leading the race from start to finish.

In 1925, the AIACR introduced the World Manufacturers' Championship. Alfa Romeo did not contest the first race, the Indianapolis 500, but instead headed to Spa-Francorchamps for the Belgian Grand Prix. Twelve drivers from four teams entered the race, but only seven turned up, from two teams: Alfa Romeo and Delage. By half way, four of the seven had retired, and by two-thirds way, only Ascari and his team-mate Giuseppe Campari remained. Ascari won the race by 21 minutes 58 seconds, with Campari having to drive twice around the circuit on his own to complete his race.

== Death and legacy ==
On 26 July 1925, Ascari took part in the French Grand Prix at the Autodrome de Montlhéry, south of Paris. He was leading the race when, on lap 23, he swerved at a left handed corner and got caught in some wooden fencing, which caused his car to overturn. One of his legs was almost severed, and he was bleeding heavily from several wounds, including a head wound; medical help was slow in coming, and Ascari died in the ambulance on his way to hospital. He was 36 years old. Alfa withdrew their other cars from the race, and race winners Robert Benoist and Albert Divo drove to the scene of the crash and laid their winners' garlands there.

Ascari's death led to an outpouring of grief, both in France and in Italy. His body was put on display in Montlhéry, where locals filed past it. During its journey to Milan by train, flowers were laid at each stop on the carriage containing his coffin. In Milan, the coffin was displayed in the Alfa Romeo building, where throngs of people filed past. Thousands lined the route of the funeral procession to the Cimitero Monumentale, where he was buried.

Ascari's son, Alberto, who was seven at the time of Antonio's death, also became a racing driver, and was two-time Formula One champion in 1952–53. He also died behind the wheel at age 36, and on the 26th of the month.

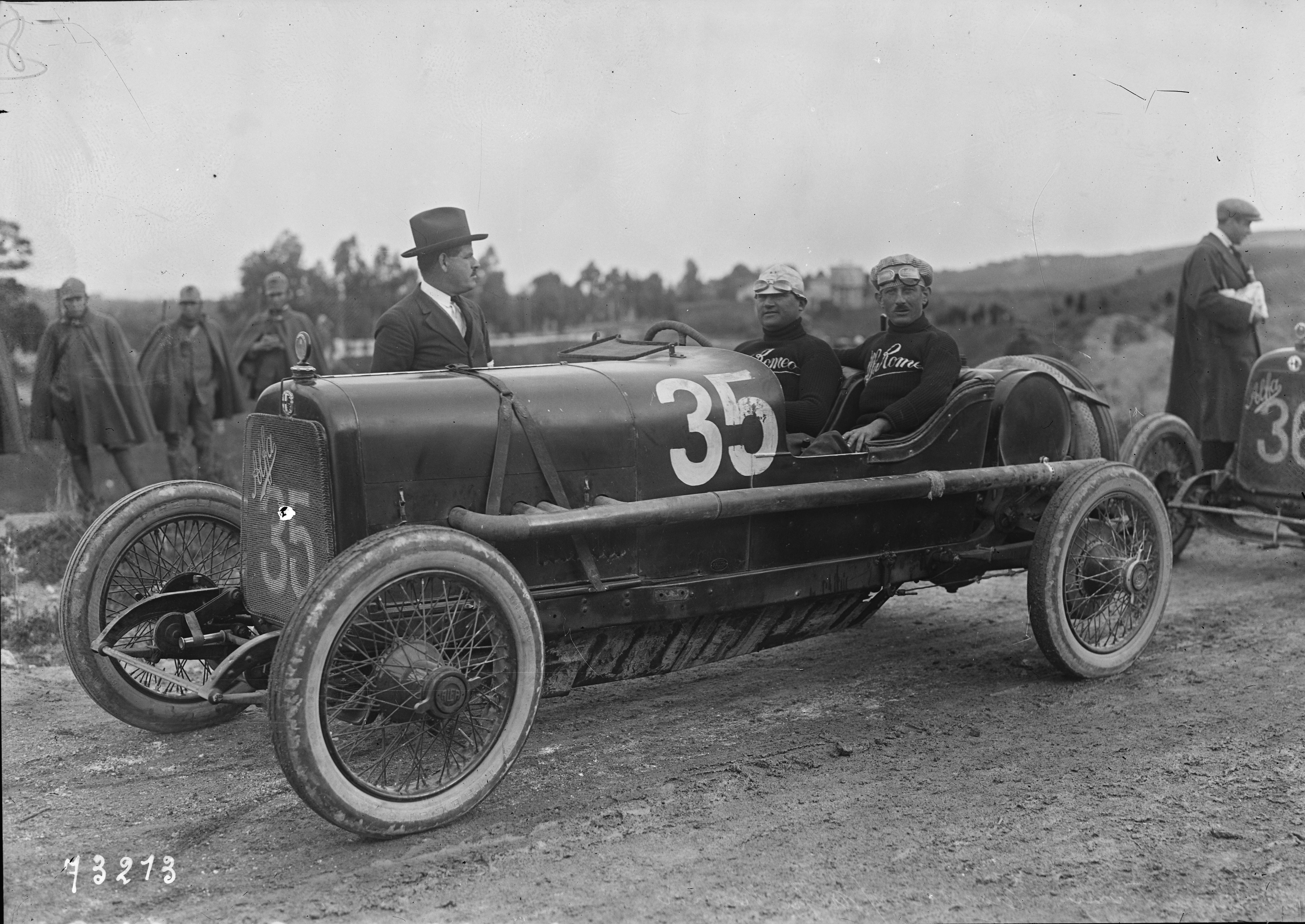
Ascari in Alfa Romeo 20-30 ES at the 1922 Targa Florio

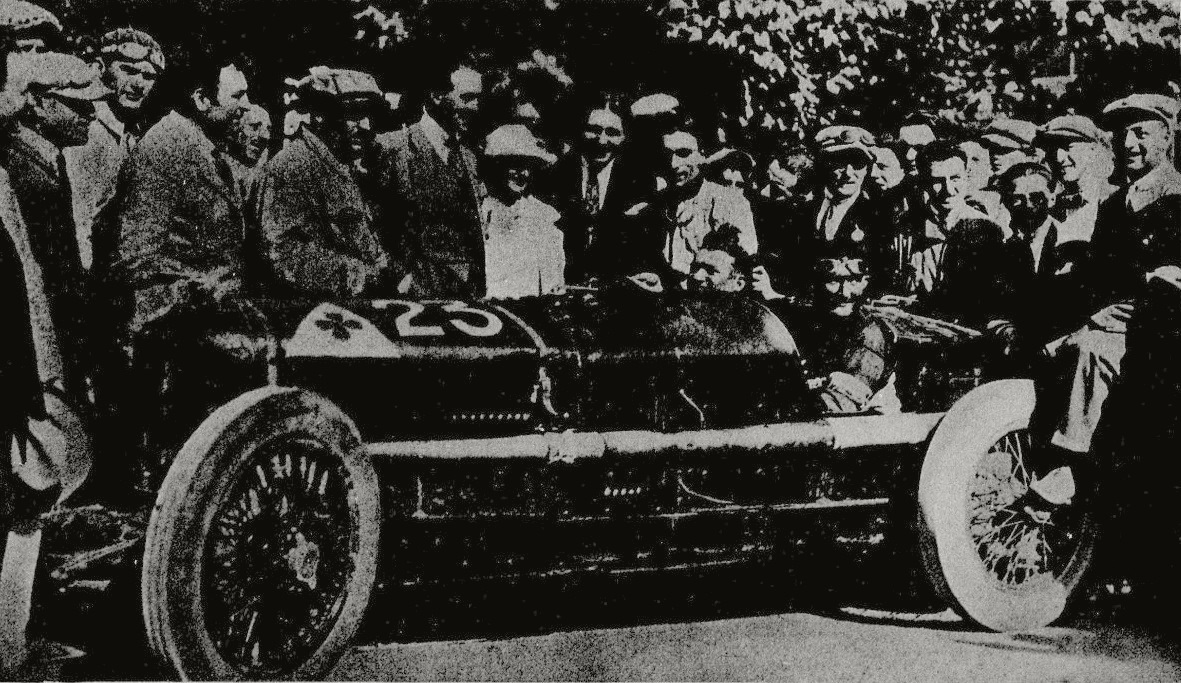
At Cremona in 1924

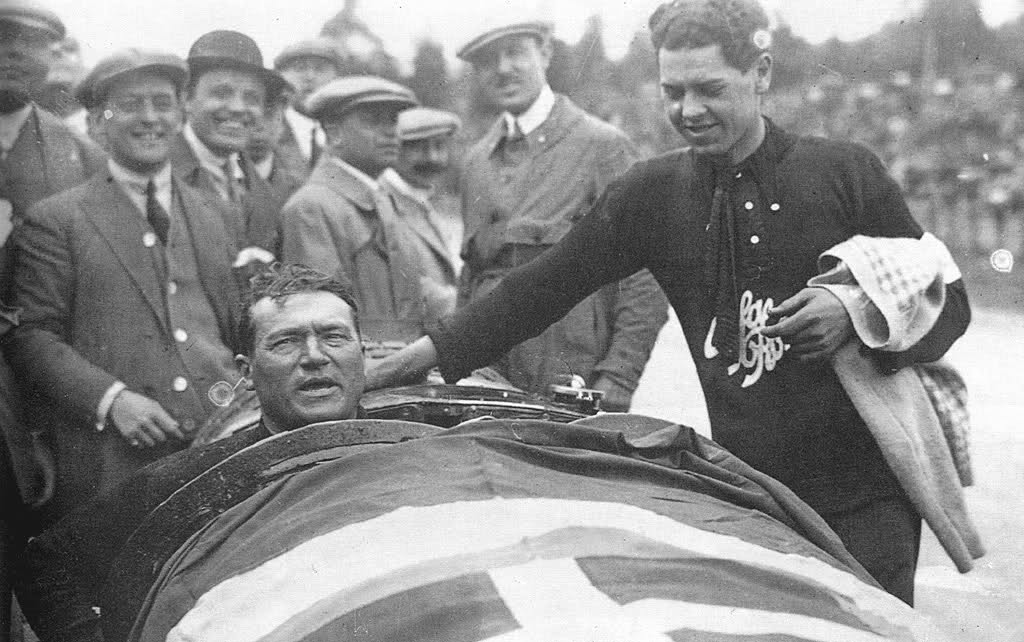
At Belgian GP in 1925
