= Alfa Romeo P2 =

Motor Vehicle

Alfa Romeo P2
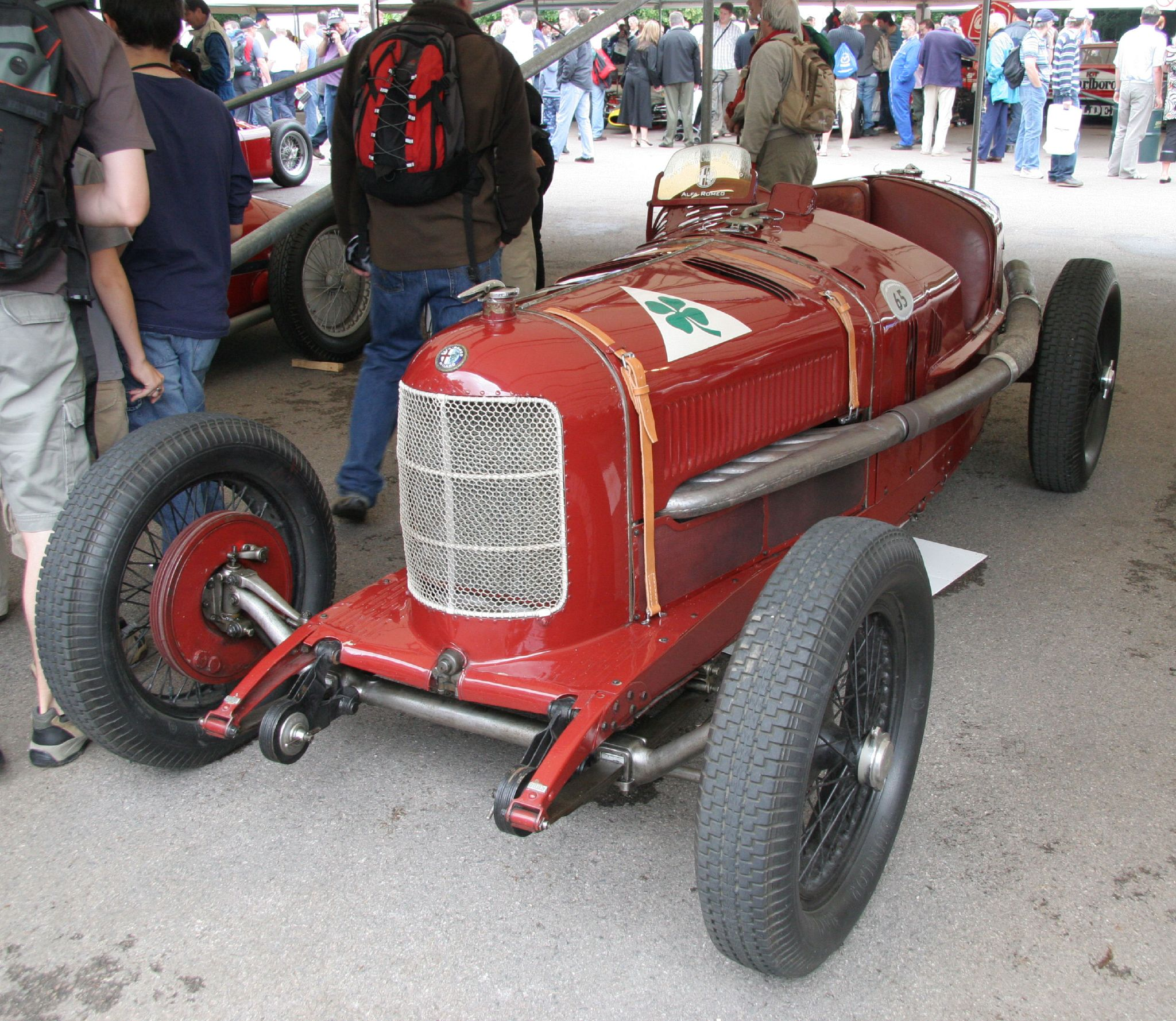
1924 P2
Category	Grand Prix
Constructor	Alfa Romeo
Team/s	Alfa Corse
Designer	Vittorio Jano
Predecessor	Alfa Romeo P1
Successor	Alfa Romeo Tipo A
Drivers	1924 + Antonio Ascari, Giuseppe Campari, Louis Wagner, Ferdinando Minoia, Gastone Brilli-Peri
Chassis
Suspension (front)	Rigid Axle, semi-elliptic leaf springs, friction shocks
Suspension (rear)	Live axle, semi-elliptic leaf springs, friction shocks
Engine	Front mounted, Alfa Romeo, Straight-8 Twin Roots Superchargers; 2 Memini carburettors, 1,987 cc, (61 x 85 mm); 140 bhp (100 kW) @ 5500 rpm (1924); 155 bhp (116 kW) @ 5500 rpm (1925)
Gearbox	Alfa Romeo 4 speed manual
Wheelbase	103.5 inches (2,630 mm)
Track	Front 51.2 inches (1,300 mm), Rear 47.2 inches (1,200 mm)
Dry weight	614 kg (1,354 lb)
Fuel
Tyres
Debut	1924 Cremona Circuit, Antonio Ascari, 1st
Races competed
Constructors' Championships	1925 Automobile World Championship
Drivers' Championships	Not applicable before 1950
Race victories	15
Last season	1930

The Alfa Romeo P2 won the inaugural Automobile World Championship in 1925, taking victory in two of the four championship rounds when Antonio Ascari drove it in the European Grand Prix at Spa and Gastone Brilli-Peri won the Italian Grand Prix at Monza after Ascari died while leading the intervening race at Montlhery.

Although 1925 brought drastic changes of regulations, from 1924 to 1930 the P2 was victorious in 14 Grands Prix and major events including the Targa Florio. It was one of the iconic Grand Prix cars of the 1920s, along with the Bugatti Type 35, and enabled Alfa Romeo, as world champions, to incorporate the laurel wreath into their logo.

The P2 was introduced by Alfa Romeo for the Circuit of Cremona in northern Italy in 1924, where Antonio Ascari won at over 158 km/h (98 mph), and then went on to win the speed trial at 195 km/h (121 mph). The car was the first creation of Alfa's new designer Vittorio Jano who had been recruited from Fiat by Enzo Ferrari when Nicola Romeo scrapped the P1 after its poor performance in the 1923 Monza Grand Prix against Fiat. The P2 was powered by Alfa's first straight-8 cylinder supercharged engine with 2 carburettors placed after the compressor.

Only 2 of the 6 original models survive, and they can be seen in the Alfa Romeo Museum in Arese and the Turin Automobile Museum. The P2 had two body styles using either a cut off or long rear.

One of the P2s was featured on the main sculpture at the 2010 Goodwood Festival of Speed.

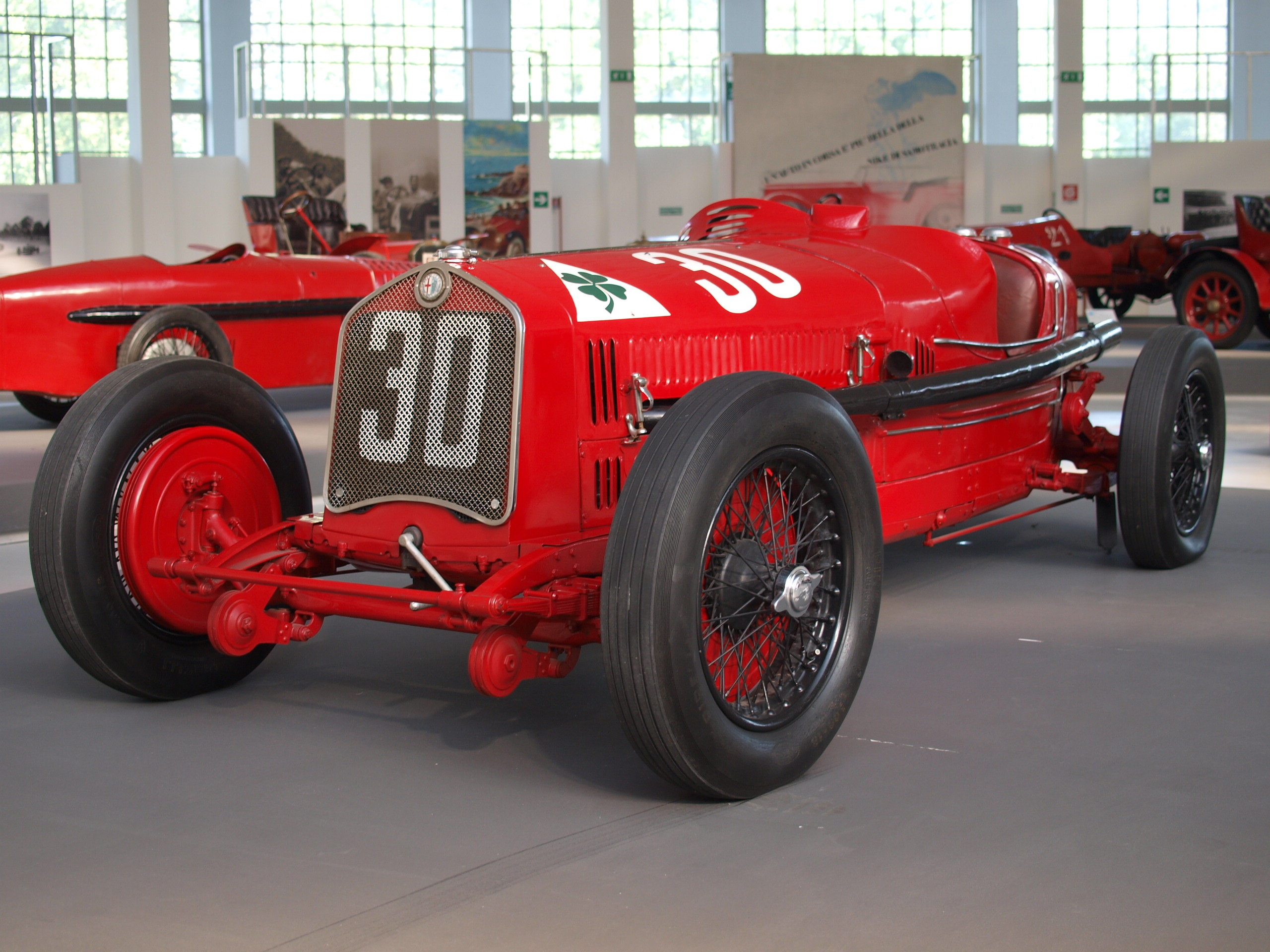
The 1930 P2 won the Targa Florio in the hands of Achille Varzi, who broke the average speed record for the race.

== Technical data ==
Technical data	P2
Engine:	Front mounted 8-cylinder in-line engine
displacement:	1987 cm^{3}
Bore x stroke:	61 x 85mm
Max power:	140 hp (1924) - 175 hp (1930)
Valve control:	2 overhead camshafts, 2 valves per cylinder
Upload:	Roots compressor
Gearbox:	4-speed manual
suspension front:	Stiff front axle, longitudinal leaf springs, friction shock absorbers
suspension rear:	Stiff rear axle, longitudinal leaf springs, friction shock absorbers
Brakes:	Mechanical drum brakes
Wheelbase:	262 cm
Dry weight:	About 600 kg
Top speed:	About 225 km/h

== Major victories ==
Year	Race	Driver	Report
1924	Cremona Grand Prix	(Italy) Antonio Ascari	Report
1924	French Grand Prix	(Italy) Giuseppe Campari	Report
1924	Italian Grand Prix	(Italy) Antonio Ascari	Report
1925	Belgian Grand Prix	(Italy) Antonio Ascari	Report
1925	Italian Grand Prix	(Italy) Gastone Brilli-Peri	Report
1927	Coppa Acerbo	(Italy) Giuseppe Campari	Report
1928	Coppa Acerbo	(Italy) Giuseppe Campari	Report
1929	Alessandria Grand Prix	(Italy) Achille Varzi	Report
1929	Rome Grand Prix	(Italy) Achille Varzi	Report
1929	Coppa Montenero	(Italy) Achille Varzi	Report
1929	Monza Grand Prix	(Italy) Achille Varzi	Report
1929	Cremona Grand Prix	(Italy) Gastone Brilli-Peri	Report
1929	Tunis Grand Prix	(Italy) Gastone Brilli-Peri	Report
1930	Alessandria Grand Prix	(Italy) Achille Varzi	Report
1930	Targa Florio	(Italy) Achille Varzi	Report
