= Giulio Masetti =

Italian racing driver (1895–1926)

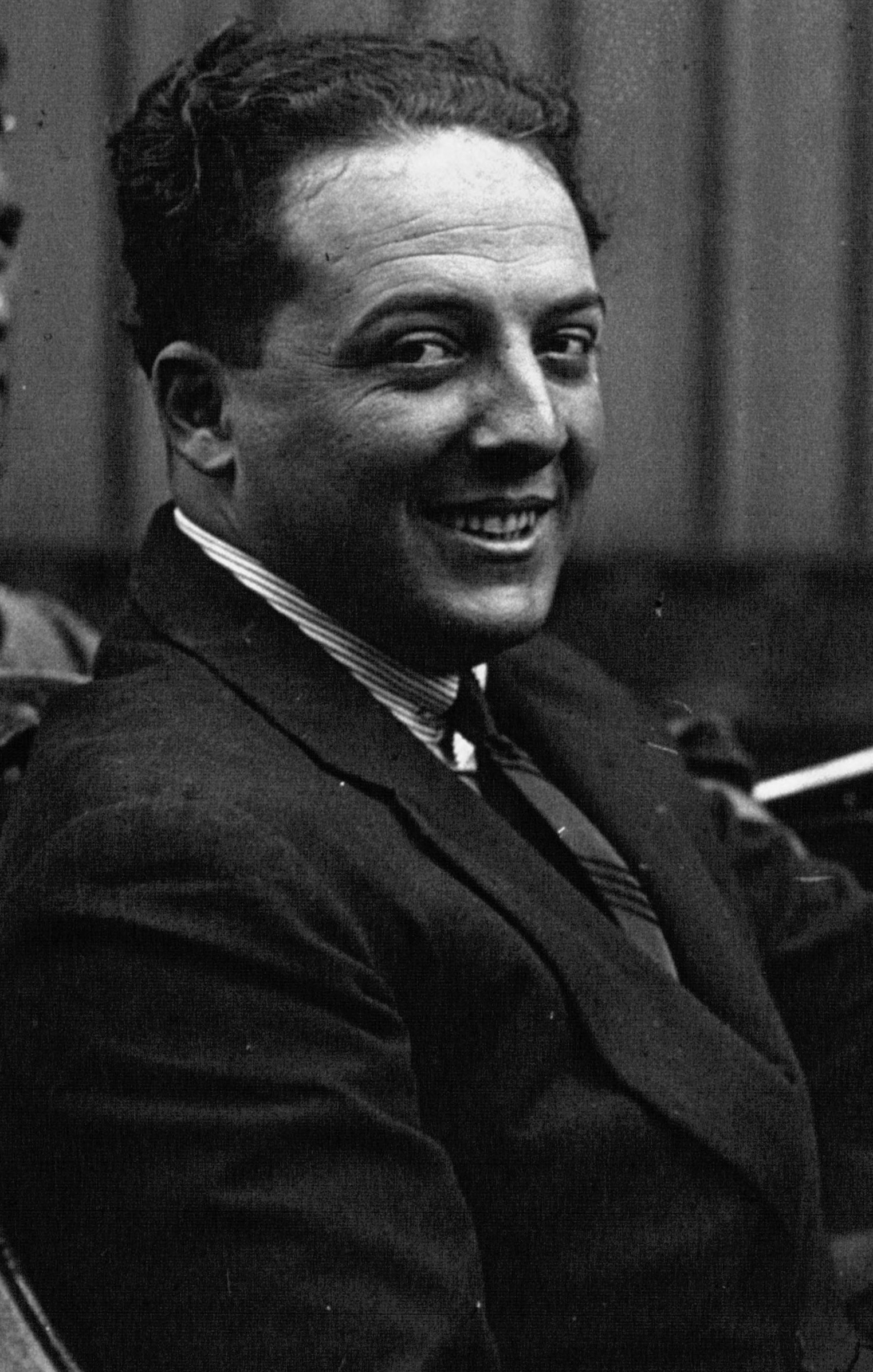
- Masetti at the 1922 French grand prix

Personal information
- Born: 1895 Vinci, Italy
- Died: 25 April, 1926 (aged 31-32) Sclafani Bagni
- Occupation(s): Nobleman, racing driver

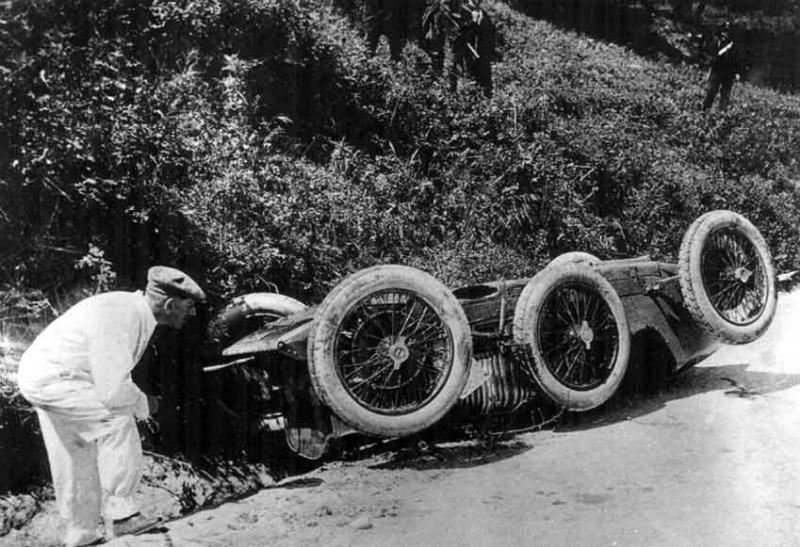
The Delage after the accident that killed Masetti

Giulio Masetti (1895 – 25 April 1926) was an Italian nobleman and racing driver, known as "the lion of Madonie" from his dominating the Targa Florio in the early 1920s.

== Early life ==
Born in Vinci, he was the older brother of the racing driver Conte Carlo Masetti, both living in Castello di Uzzano, a palace in Greve in Chianti owned by the Masetti di Bagnano family since 1644.

== Career ==
Masetti acquired his first car, a 4.5-litre Fiat S57 B14 from Antonio Ascari, in which he was fourth at X Targa Florio (1919), and won the XII Targa Florio (1921).

The next year, he won XIII Targa Florio in his privately entered red ex-Otto Salzer 1914 French Grand Prix Mercedes 4.5-litre 115 HP 18/100 (1922). Masetti then raced an Alfa Romeo RL TF (second at XIV Targa Florio, 1924) before joining the Sunbeam-Talbot-Darracq team. He was third in a Sunbeam 135 bhp 2-litre at the 1925 French Grand Prix, but failed to finish the San Sebastián Grand Prix (1925) and the II Rome Grand Prix (1926).

== Death ==
He suffered a fatal accident in Sclafani Bagni, Sicily during the XVII Targa Florio while driving entry #13, a Delage 2L CV. A stone plaque is erected at the place. Since this incident, the entry #13 is no longer issued at Grand Prix events.
