= Gastone Brilli-Peri =

Italian racing driver (1893–1930)

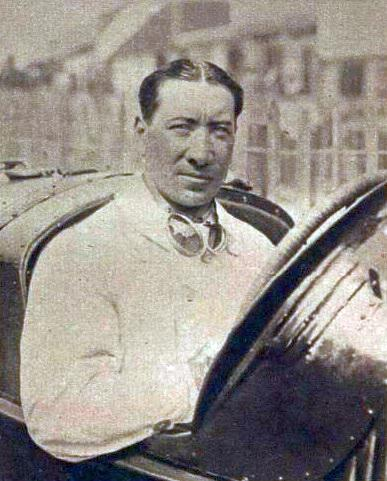
Brilli-Peri in 1925

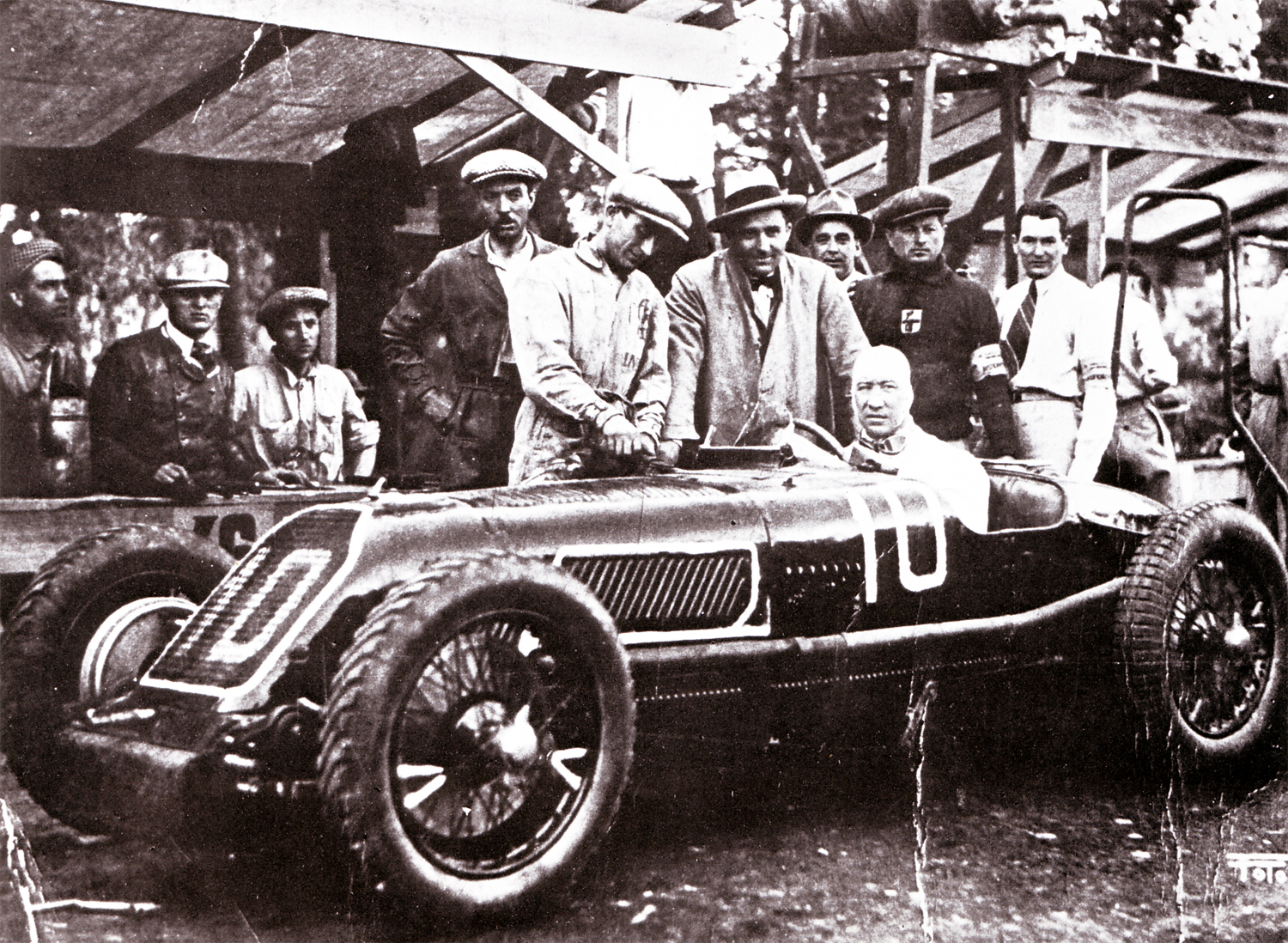
Brilli-Peri in a Talbot.

Count Gastone Brilli-Peri (24 March 1893 – 22 March 1930) was an Italian racing driver, who won the 1925 Italian Grand Prix in an Alfa Romeo P2, securing the inaugural World Manufacturers' Championship title for Alfa Romeo. Known simply as "Brilli", his face had been permanently scarred in an accident during a Tour of Italy motorcycle race. He used to race wearing a hat similar to a Basque beret, which is now known in Italy as a brilliperi.

== Biography ==
Brilli-Peri was born in Florence into a noble family. He debuted in a bicycle race in 1907, aged 14. In 1911 he won the Tuscan cycling championship. In 1912 he bought a motorcycle, and in 1914 he debuted in a race at the Lake Trasimeno, winning the 1st Motogiro of Italy in the same year.

He first raced as a car driver just after World War I, where he had acted asa motorcycle driver. In 1925, in an Alfa Romeo P2, he won his first Grand Prix at the Italian Grand Prize at Monza. In 1929, still in the Alfa Romeo P2, he won the Circuit of Cremona and the Tripoli Grand Prix in Italian Libya.

Brilli-Peri was killed in 1930 during Saturday practice for the sixth Tripoli Grand Prix. Free practice had been scheduled from 11am to 1:50pm and Brilli-Peri, who knew the track well having won the race one year earlier, came to test the cars of his team, the Scuderia Materassi.

He first made one lap on his car, then moved to the vehicle of his teammate Clemente Biondetti, which had carburation problems. Brilli-Peri made one lap with Biondetti's car and then jumped again in his Talbot for another stint. However, during the second lap he crashed heavily near the village of Suq al Jum’ah (also known as Suk el Giuma or Sugh el Giumaa (سوق الجمعة)) and was killed on impact.

According to eyewitnesses, while negotiating a fast left-handed bend, the car bounced on the irregular surface of the track. Brilli-Peri could not control it anymore and went straight into the right embankment, being ejected from the vehicle. The accident happened around 12:50pm. The race (composed of two heats - the first of them for voiturettes only - and a final), was won by Baconin Borzacchini in a Maserati. Clemente Biondetti won the voiturette heat and was classified third in the final.

Brilli-Peri died at the age of 37 years; the stadium of his native city, Montevarchi, is named in his honour. The Italian actress Nancy Brilli is a niece of Brilli-Peri.

== See also ==
- Auto Racing
