= Giuseppe Campari =

Italian racing driver (1892–1933)

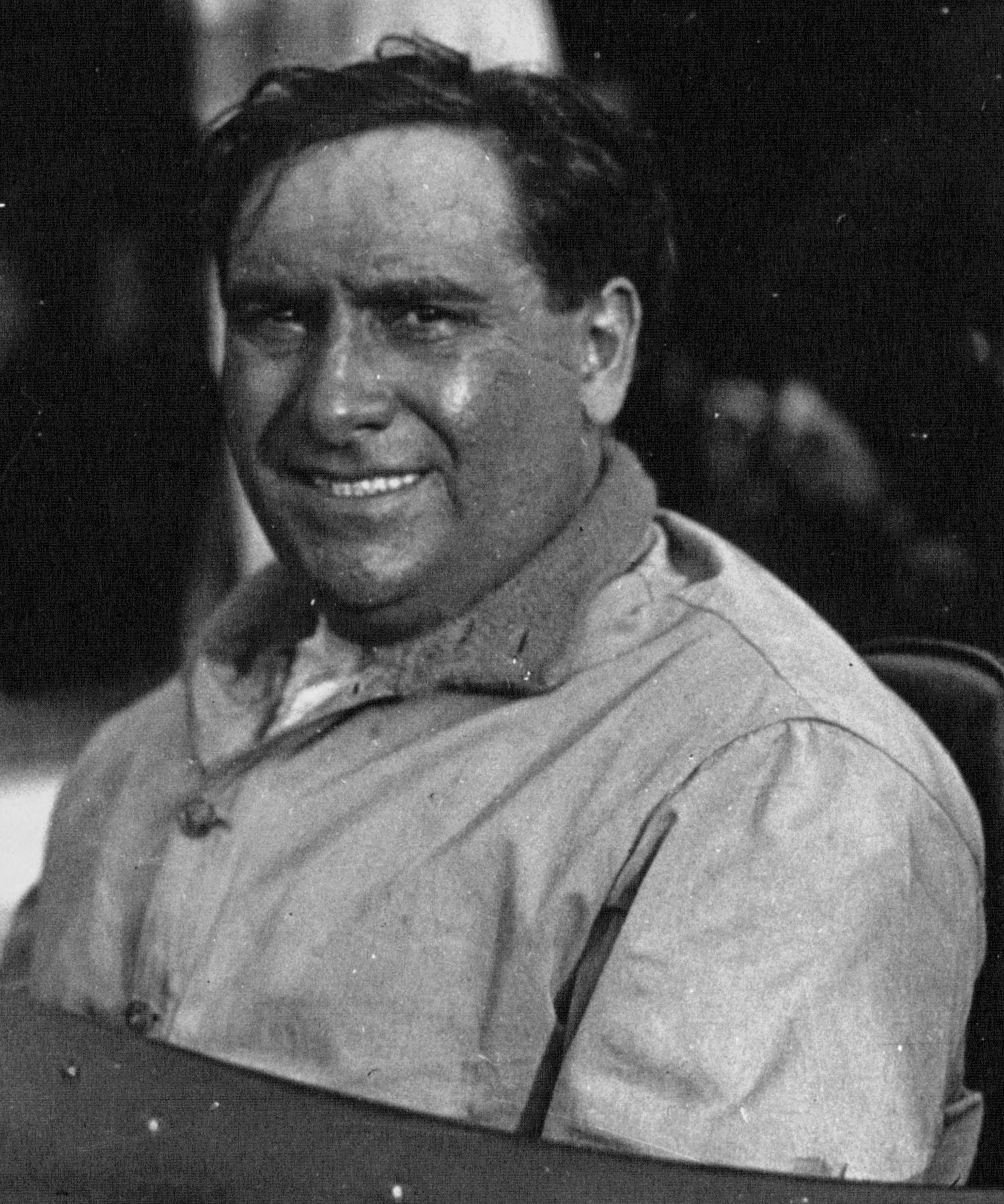
- Born: 8 June 1892; Lodi, Italy
- Died: 10 September 1933 (aged 41); Monza, Italy
- Occupations: Racing driver and opera singer

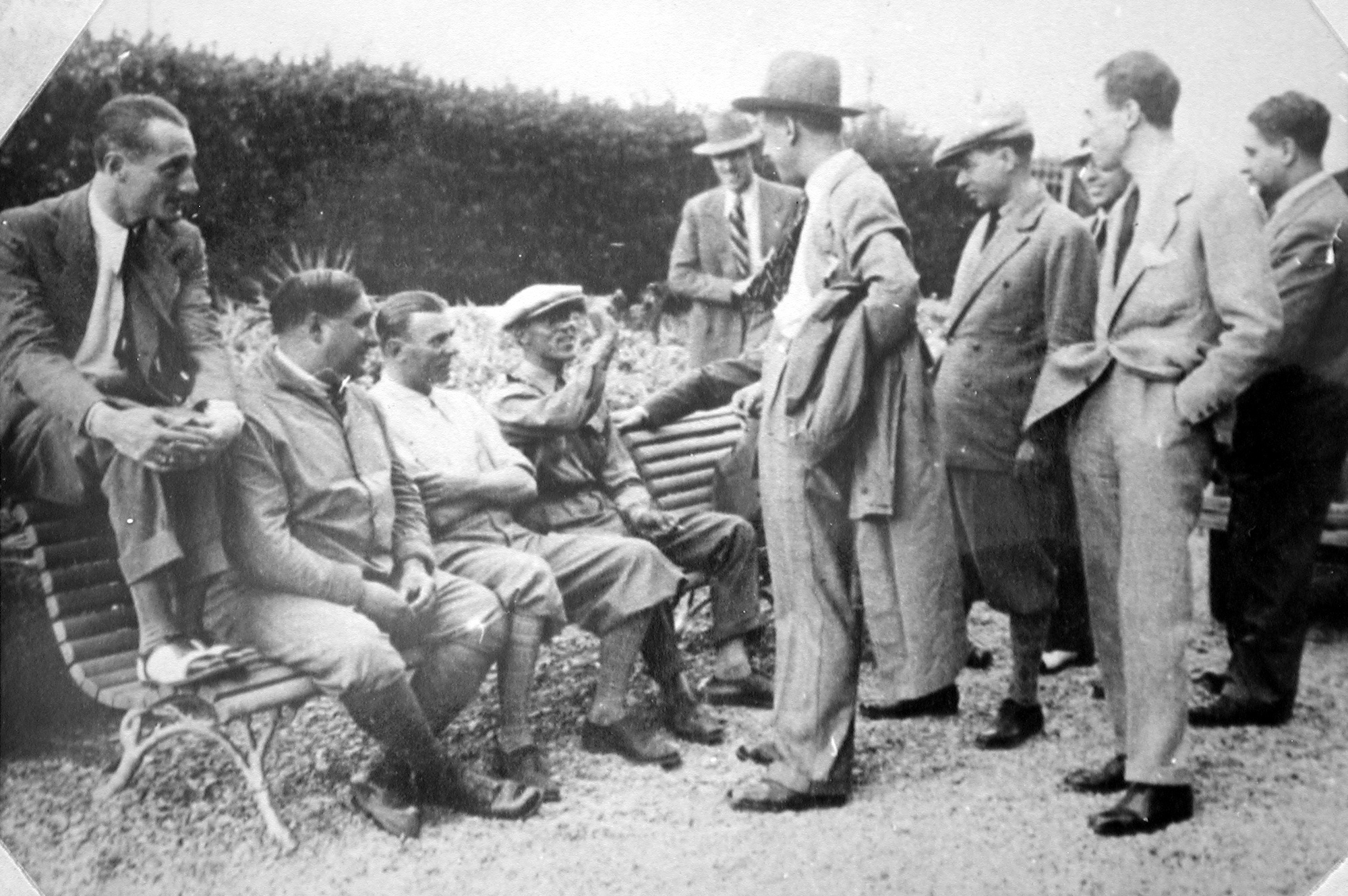
The racecar drivers Giuseppe Campari (2nd from left), Achille Varzi (3rd) and Tazio Nuvolari (4th) of Alfa Romeo with Prospero Gianferrari (6th).

Giuseppe Campari (8 June 1892 – 10 September 1933) was an Italian opera singer and Grand Prix motor racing driver.

== Racing career ==
Born near the city of Lodi southwest of Milan, as a teenager he went to work for the Alfa Romeo automobile company. Campari's job eventually involved test driving factory cars and his skills and interest led to his participation in competitive hillclimbing events. In 1914 the 21-year-old rookie showed his abilities with a fourth-place finish at the Targa Florio. His career was just getting going when World War I broke out and European racing came to a halt.

Following the Armistice that ended the war, racing resumed and in 1920 Campari earned his first major race win and the first for the Alfa Romeo company when he drove to victory at Mugello in Tuscany. He repeated as champion at Mugello the next year and took third place at the Targa Florio but did not earn another major championship until he captured the French Grand Prix in 1924 when he was part of a powerful three-man Alfa Romeo team with Count Gastone Brilli-Peri and Antonio Ascari in the P2 cars designed by Vittorio Jano.

The 1925 racing season was less than successful for Campari as he and the Alfa Romeo team withdrew from the French Grand Prix in July after Ascari crashed and died. In 1926, Maserati came out with the Tipo 26, its first highly competitive race car that led to Maserati winning the Constructors' title and Ernesto Maserati taking the Italian driving championship in 1927. Despite Maserati's strong performances, Campari claimed victory for Alfa Romeo in the 1927 Coppa Acerbo.

The 1928 season saw Giuseppe Campari win his second consecutive Coppa Acerbo and his first at the Mille Miglia. He earned a second-place finish in the Targa Florio, a race he entered several times and although he frequently finished near the top, he never managed a win. The following year he repeated as champion at the Mille Miglia and along with top drivers such as Malcolm Campbell and Rudolf Caracciola, he traveled to Ireland to compete in the inaugural Irish International Grand Prix at Phoenix Park in Dublin. Run in front of more than 100,000 spectators, Campari was hit in the eye by a flying small rock but was successfully treated in hospital and the race was won by the Russian émigré, Boris Ivanowski. Campari also raced in the Tourist Trophy Races at the Ards course in Belfast where he finished second to Caracciola's Mercedes.

In 1930, Tazio Nuvolari joined Campari on the Alfa Romeo team. After a sensational debut season, Nuvolari and Campari combined to win their first Italian Grand Prix, a victory that made them national heroes for taking the championship from the French who had won it for the past three years. That same year, Campari won his third Coppa Acerbo but for 1933 he became part of the Maserati team with Baconin Borzacchini and Luigi Fagioli. Campari won his second French Grand Prix driving for Maserati, but at age 41 was ready to retire at the end of the season.

The Italian Grand Prix on 10 September 1933 at the Autodromo Nazionale Monza in Monza, Italy was to be his last race. While leading the race, Campari was instantly killed when his car crashed after skidding on a sharp turn on a patch of leaked engine oil.

== Personal life ==
In addition to his love of automobile racing, Giuseppe Campari had two other passions: food, in great quantities that he liked to prepare himself, and the opera. Blessed with a great baritone voice from the depths of an expansive paunch, he took singing lessons and while still racing began to sing professionally.

== Major victories ==
- Circuit of Mugello 1920, 1921
- Coppa Acerbo 1927, 1928, 1931
- French Grand Prix 1924, 1933
- Italian Grand Prix 1931
- Mille Miglia 1928, 1929

== Racing record ==
=== Complete European Championship results ===
(key) (Races in bold indicate pole position) (Races in italics indicate fastest lap)

Year	Entrant	Chassis	Engine	1	2	3	EDC	Pts
1931	SA Alfa Romeo	Alfa Romeo 8C-2300	Alfa Romeo 2.3 L8	ITA; 1		BEL; Ret	2nd	9
1931	SA Alfa Romeo	Alfa Romeo Monza	Alfa Romeo 2.3 L8		FRA; 2		2nd	9
1932	SA Alfa Romeo	Alfa Romeo Tipo B/P3	Alfa Romeo 2.6 L8	ITA; 4	FRA	GER	9th	20

=== 24 Hours of Le Mans results ===
Year	Team	Co-Drivers	Car	Class	Laps	Pos.	Class Pos.
1931	(Italy) Automobili Alfa Romeo	(Italy) Ferdinando Minoia	Alfa Romeo 8C 2300 LM	3.0	-	DNS	DNS

Sporting positions
Preceded by Ferdinando Minoia; Giuseppe Morandi	Winner of the Mille Miglia; 1928-1929 with: Giulio Ramponi	Succeeded by Tazio Nuvolari; Battista Guidotti
