= Vittorio Jano =

Italian engineer and car designer (1891–1965)

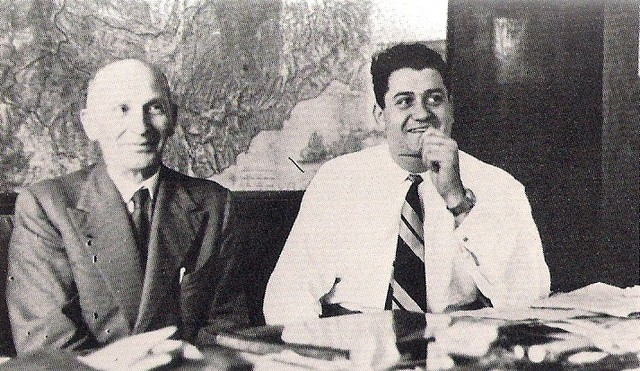
Jano and Lancia owner Gianni Lancia.

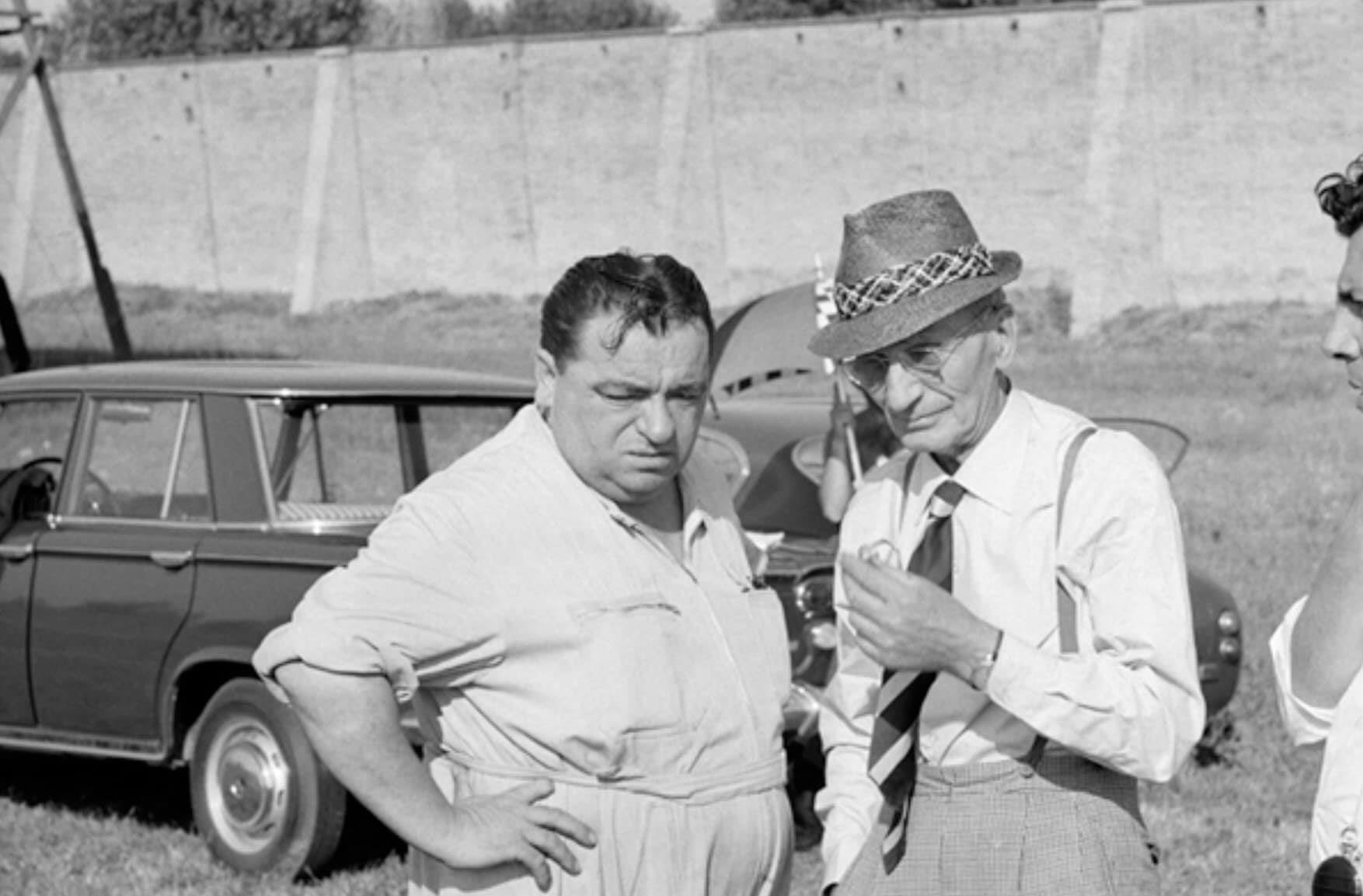
Jano (right) and carrozzeria engineer Medardo Fantuzzi left on 31 July 1962.

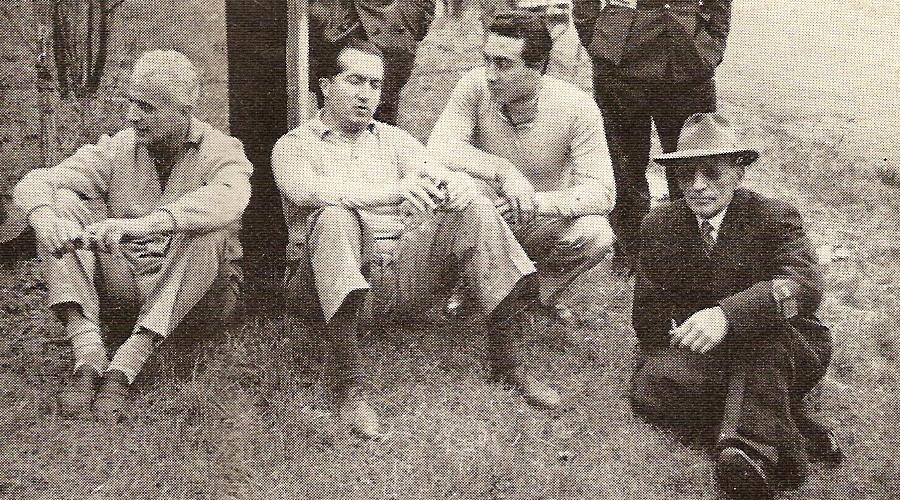
Jano (far right) with Lancia drivers Luigi Villoresi, Alberto Ascari and Eugenio Castellotti at the 1955 Valentino Grand Prix in Turin on 27 March 1955

Vittorio Jano (Hungarian: János Viktor; 22 April 1891 – 13 March 1965) was an Italian automobile designer of Hungarian descent, active in European racing car engine design from the 1920s through 1960s.

Jano was born Viktor János in San Giorgio Canavese, in Piedmont, to Hungarian immigrants, who had arrived there several years earlier. He began at the car and truck company Società Torinese Automobili Rapid owned by G.B. Ceirano. In 1911 he moved to Fiat under Luigi Bazzi.

== With Alfa Romeo ==
Jano moved with Bazzi to Alfa Romeo in 1923 to replace Giuseppe Merosi as chief engineer. At Alfa Romeo his first design was the 8-cylinder in-line mounted Alfa Romeo P2 Grand Prix car, which won Alfa Romeo the inaugural world championship for Grand Prix cars in 1925. In 1932, he produced the sensational Alfa Romeo P3 model, which later was raced with great success by Enzo Ferrari and his Scuderia Ferrari in 1933.

For Alfa road cars Jano developed a series of small-to-medium-displacement 4-, 6-, and 8-cylinder inline power plants based on the P2 unit that established the classic architecture of Alfa engines, with light alloy construction, hemispherical combustion chambers, centrally located plugs, two rows of overhead valves per cylinder bank, and dual overhead cams. In 1936 he designed the Alfa Romeo 12C using a V12. The car's lack of success is given as the reason for Jano's resignation from Alfa Romeo at the end of 1937.

== Lancia years ==
In late 1937 Jano moved to Lancia. Among his designs there were the Lancia Aurelia, and efforts in the Grand Prix effort. The innovative Lancia D50 was introduced in 1954, but 1955's loss of Alberto Ascari and the 1955 Le Mans disaster soured the company on GP racing. Ferrari took over the effort that same year, inheriting Jano with it.

== Ferrari period ==
Jano's contribution to Ferrari was significant. Immediately he began work on a new V12 engine to replace the existing inline-4-engined sports cars. In 1956 his new Jano V12 engine was introduced in the Ferrari 290 MM. The new series of the Jano-engined sports cars helped secure two World Sportscar Championship titles. With the encouragement of Enzo's son, Alfredo, the Jano's V6 engines pushed the bigger Lampredi and Colombo engines aside in some races. After Dino's death, Jano's "Dino" V6 became the basis for the company's Formula Two and Tasman Series efforts. Later, with experience in both Ferrari and Dino mid-engine sports prototypes it laid the groundwork for their first mid-engined road car, the 1967 Dino 206 GT. The V6 and V8 went on to displace Ferrari's V12 focus and their descendants continue to be used today.

== Personal life ==
Like Enzo Ferrari, Jano lost his own son in 1965. He became gravely ill that same year and committed suicide in Turin.

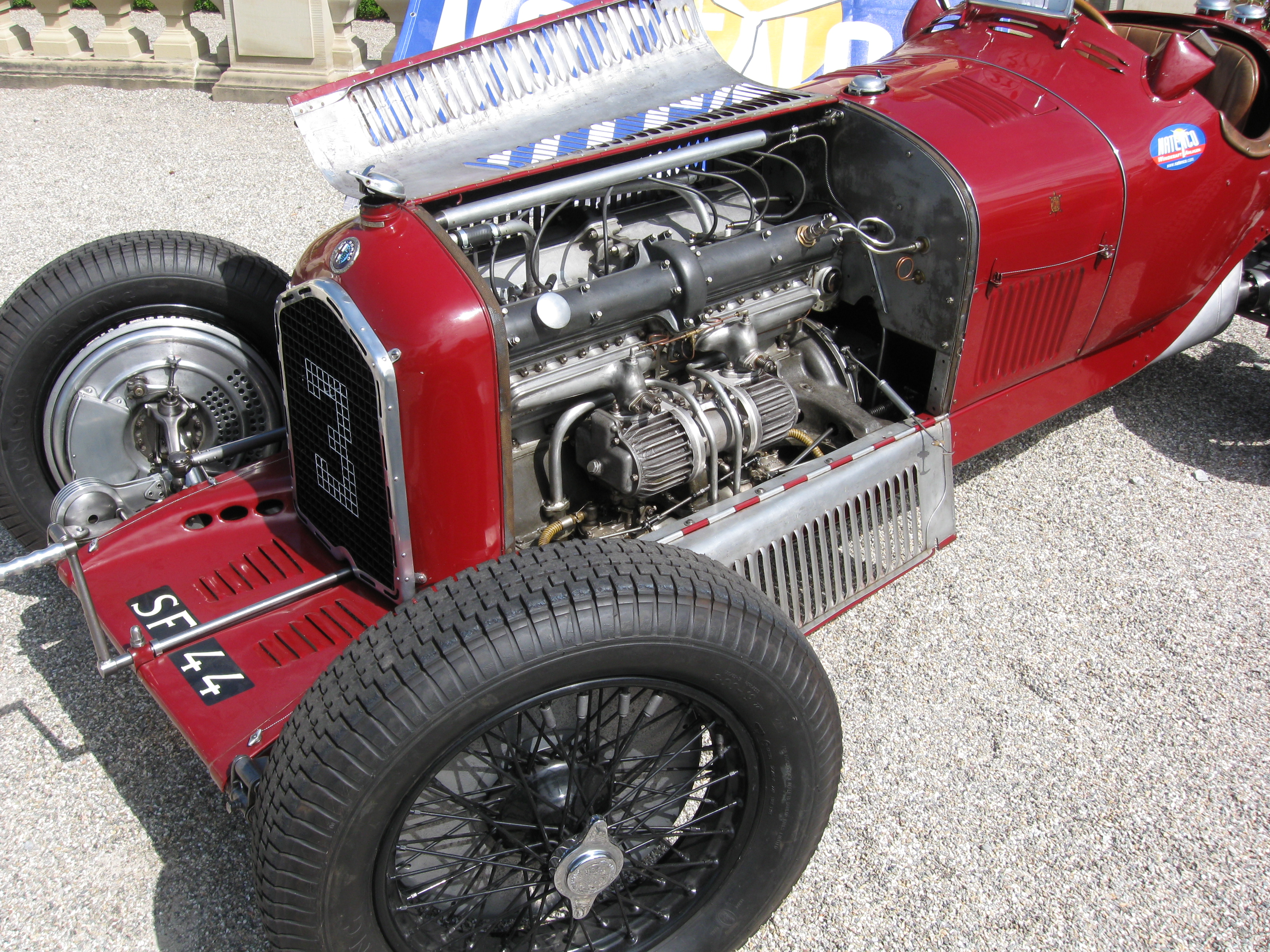
Engine of Jano's Alfa P3 Type B - Note the twin gear driven superchargers.

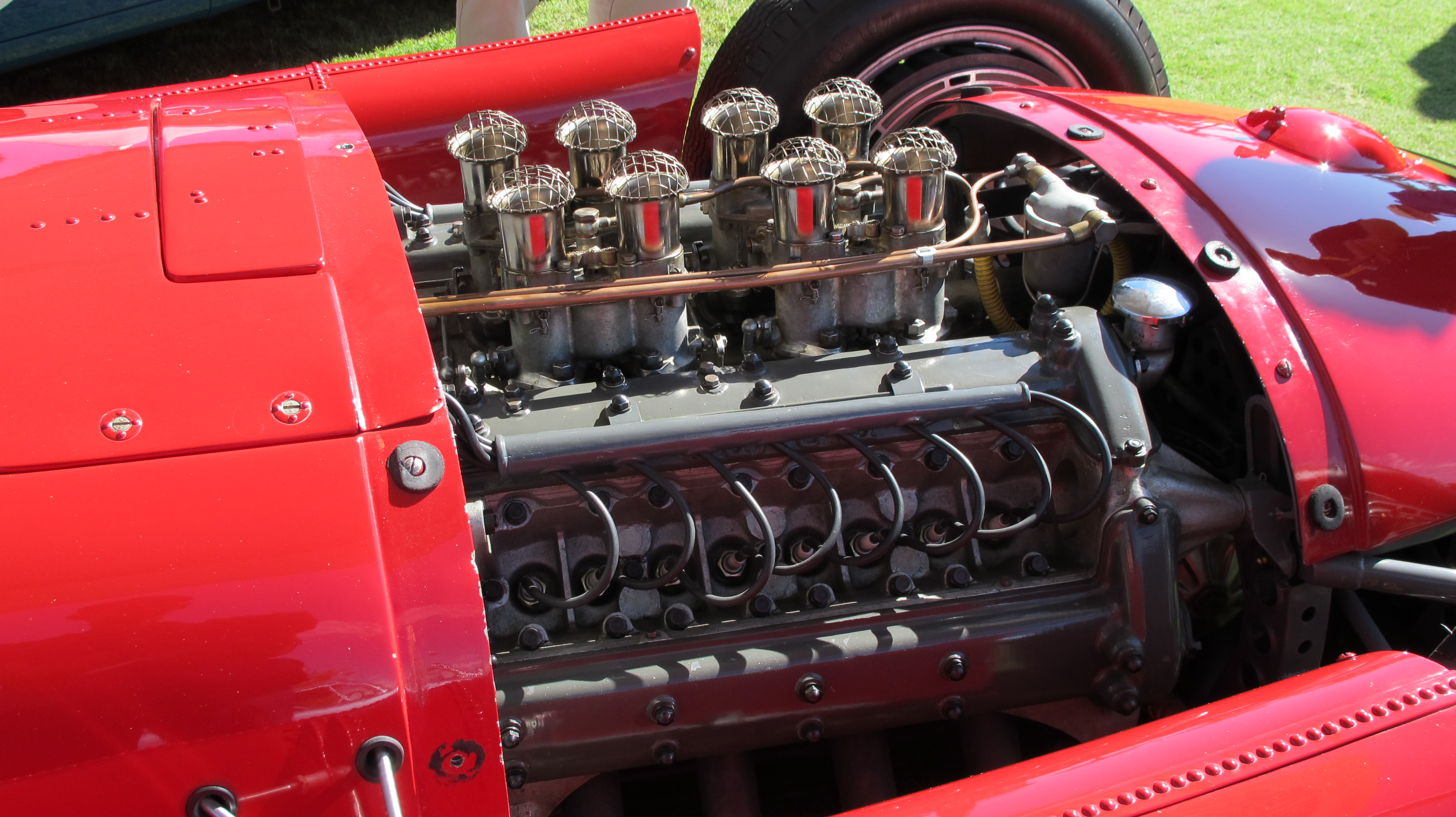
A Jano designed V8 engine in the Lancia-Ferrari D50 Grand Prix car
