= 1921 Grand Prix season =

Grand Prix season

Seasons
- ← 1920 1922 →

The 1921 Grand Prix season saw motor racing in Europe blossom again. The French Grand Prix was held for the first time since 1914, at La Sarthe, Le Mans. and the inaugural Italian Grand Prix was held in Montichiari, near Brescia. The 3-litre formula of the AIACR, already in use at Indianapolis, was adopted by those Grand Prix meaning manufacturers could design on a common formula.

Wealthy privateer Conte Giulio Masetti, gave FIAT's only win in the Targa Florio, heading home a big field including a strong challenge from Max Sailer’s Mercedes. This year was the swansong of European involvement in the Indianapolis 500. For the third year in a row, Ralph DePalma recorded the fastest time in practise (driving for Ballot), but it was former Duesenberg driver Tommy Milton who comfortably won for Louis Chevrolet’s Frontenac team, on his way to claiming the AAA championship for 1921.

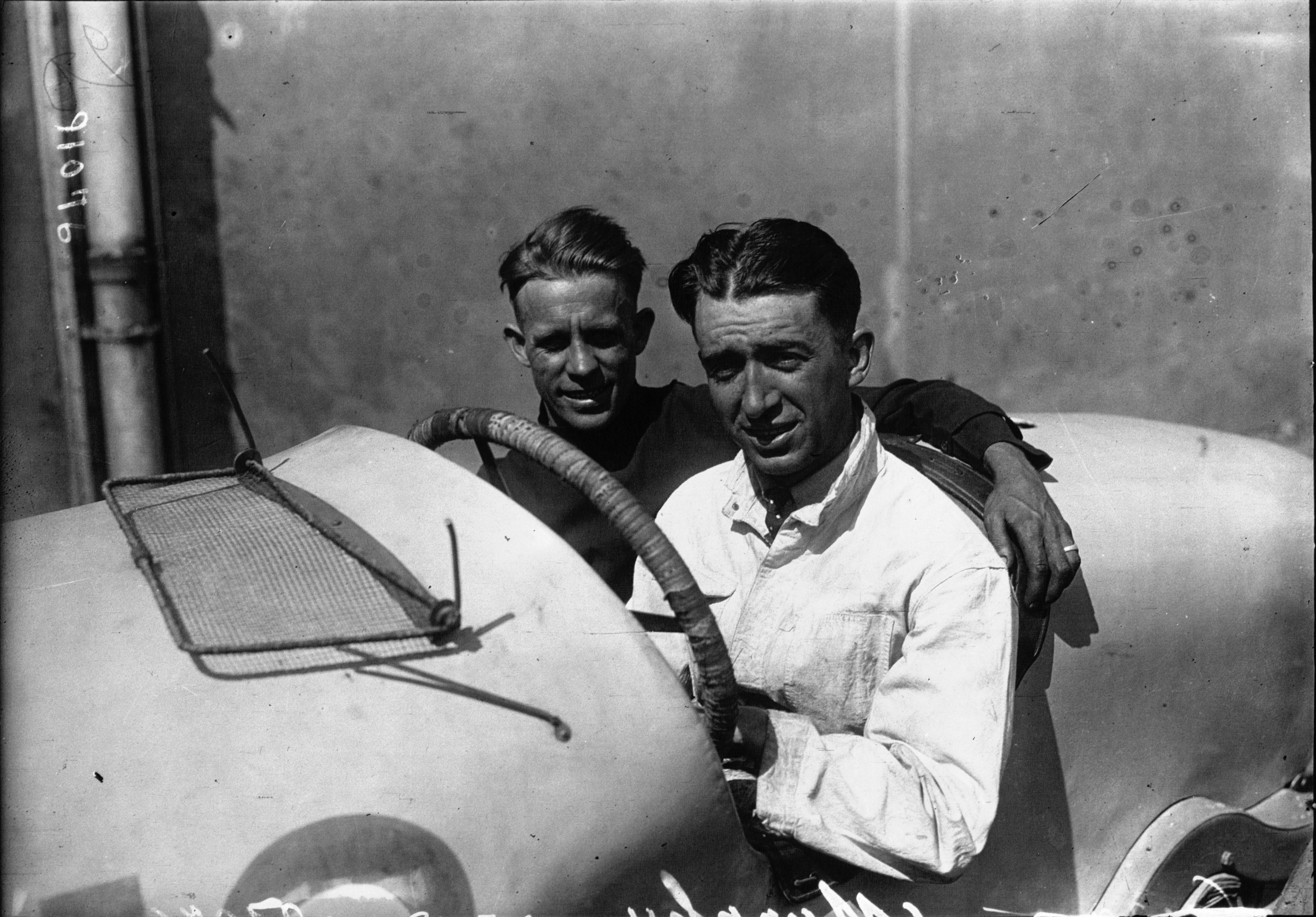
Jimmy Murphy and mechanic Ernie Olsen, winners of the French Grand Prix

An international field lined up for the French Grand Prix, with entries from France, Great Britain, Italy and a late entry from the American Duesenberg team. Those cars had innovative hydraulically operated four-wheel brakes giving them a decided advantage on the sharp corners of the Le Mans course. Lead driver Jimmy Murphy had a big accident during practice but, heavily bandaged up, he took the start. Never seriously challenged in the race, Murphy became the first driver to win both an American and European Grand Prix, with DePalma coming home second for Ballot.

A promising field for the first Italian Grand Prix evaporated leaving just six cars – a two-way battle between Ballot and FIAT. By driving more consistently and looking after their tyres, it was a French victory for the Ballots of Goux and Chassagne, with Wagner’s FIAT being the only other finisher.

During the year, Germany opened its first purpose-built racing track – the very fast AVUS circuit just outside of Berlin. At the end of the year, the AIACR signalled the close of the 3-litre formula. Ballot shut down its racing program to concentrate on touring-car production and it marked the start of the divergence of the European and American racing scenes.

== Major races ==
Date	Name	Circuit	Race Regulations	Race Distance	Winner's Time	Winning driver	Winning constructor	Report
22 May	(Italy) I Circuito del Garda	Salò	Formula Libre	200 km	2h 47m	(Italy) Eugenio Silvani	Bugatti Type 22	Report
29 May	(Italy) XII Targa Florio	Medio Madonie	Targa Florio	430 km	7h 25m	(Italy) Conte Giulio Masetti	Fiat 451	Report
30 May	(United States) IX International 500 Mile Sweepstakes	Indianapolis	AAA	500 miles	5h 35m	(United States) Tommy Milton	Frontenac	Report
6 Jun	(Italy) I Coppa della Cascine	Florence	Formula Libre	110 km	1h 03m	(Italy) "Deo" (Amadeo Chiribiri)	Chiribiri	Report
26 Jun	(France) I Grand Prix de MCF	Provins	Cyclecar	300 km	3h 49m	(France) Chabreiron	E.H.P.-Ruby	Report
3 Jul	(France) I Grand Prix de Boulogne	Boulogne-sur-Mer	Voiturette	500 km	5h 46m	(France) Joseph Collomb	La Licorne	Report
24 Jul	(Italy) II Circuito di Mugello	Mugello	Formula Libre	390 km	6h 13m	(Italy) Giuseppe Campari	Alfa Romeo 40/60	Report
26 Jul	(France) XV French Grand Prix	Le Mans	AIACR	515 km	4h 07m	(United States) Jimmy Murphy	Duesenberg	Report
4 Sep	(Italy) I Italian Grand Prix (Italy) V Coppa Florio	Montichiari	AIACR	520 km	3h 35m	(France) Jules Goux	Ballot 3-litre	Report
8 Sep	(Italy) I Gran Premio della Vetturette	Montichiari	Voiturette	350 km	2h 59m	(France) Ernest Friderich	Bugatti Type 22	Report
12 Sep	(Italy) Circuito di Brescia	Montichiari	Voiturette	350 km	3h 10m	(Italy) Franz Conelli	Bugatti Type 22	Report
17 Sep	(France) III Grand Prix de l’UMF	Le Mans	Cyclecar	310 km	3h 32m	(France) André Lombard	Salmson AL	Report
18 Sep	(France) IX Coupe des Voiturettes	Le Mans	Voiturette	440 km	3h 52m	(France) René Thomas	Talbot-Darracq 56	Report
25 Sep	(Italy) I Coppa Montenero	Montenero	Formula Libre	110 km	2h 44m	(Italy) Corrado Lotti	Ansaldo 2000	Report
16 Oct	(Spain) I Gran Premi Penya Rhin	Villafranca	Voiturette	440 km	5h 11m	(Spain) Pierre de Vizcaya	Bugatti Type 22	Report
22 Nov	(United Kingdom) I Junior Car Club 200	Brooklands	Voiturette	200 miles	2h 16m	(United Kingdom) Henry Segrave	Talbot-Darracq 56	Report

== Regulations and technical ==
The regulations set up by the AIACR (forerunner of the FIA) the previous year remained in force: an engine limit of 3.0-litres, with a minimum weight of 800 kg. These were being taken up in Europe and the United States, allowing manufacturers a unified platform to design around. This year the Targa Florio regulations were open to any-sized racing cars, as well as production cars available to the public, divided into four engine-capacity categories (split at 2.0, 3.0 and 4.5-litres).

The new Duesenberg was fitted with hydraulic brakes on all four wheels. Using pressurised glycerine and water, it was the first racing car to be fitted with them. It would be a further ten years until Maserati picked them up as well.

Manufacturer	Model	Engine	Power Output	Max. Speed (km/h)	Dry Weight (kg)
(France) Ballot	3-Litre	Ballot 3.0L S8	108 bhp	180	920
(France) Peugeot	Indianapolis	Peugeot 3.0L S4	110 bhp	180	1050
(United States) Duesenberg	GP	Duesenberg 3.0L S8	115 bhp	185	1160
(United States) Frontenac		Frontenac 3.0L S8	125 bhp	180	1020
(United States) Miller		Miller 3.0L S8	125 bhp	185	990
(Italy) Alfa Romeo	40/60	Alfa Romeo 6.1L S4	82 bhp	160	1100
(Italy) Alfa Romeo	20/30 ES	Alfa Romeo 4.3L S4	67 bhp	170	920
(Italy) Fiat S.p.A.	801-402	FIAT 3.0L S8	120 bhp	155	830
(Germany) Mercedes Benz	28/95	Mercedes 7.3L S6	150 bhp	185	980

== Season review ==
The season opened in Italy in May. A number of local events were held across the country this year. In the first, the northern Circuito del Garda, was entered a 30-year old motorcyclist, now trying his hand at four-wheel racing – Tazio Nuvolari, driving an Ansaldo. The Targa Florio returned to its springtime date and attracted one of its biggest and best fields to date. It included a number of Italian grand prix and sports cars, as well as a 1914 works Mercedes driven by Max Sailer from Stuttgart for the event. The Alfa Corse team returned with a 6-litre 40/60 for team leader Giuseppe Campari, and there were 20/30 hp ES sports models for Antonio Ascari, Enzo Ferrari, Ugo Sivocci and Giuseppe Baldoni. The FIAT team had a pair of 3-litre 801s for Ferdinando Minoia and Pietro Bordino, while wealthy privateer, the Conte Giulio Masetti drove a S57/14B. Other privateers filled the field with a range of Italian cars including Diatto and SCAT, Ceirano and Itala from the Ceirano brothers.

Sailer set the pace from the start, taking the lead with the fastest lap of the race on the first lap. But Masetti's skill got him the lead the next time around. Despite Sailer's pressure, he held on to win by two minutes in what was to be FIAT's only win in this iconic Italian event. The three Alfa Romeos of Campari, Sivocci and Ferrari were next.

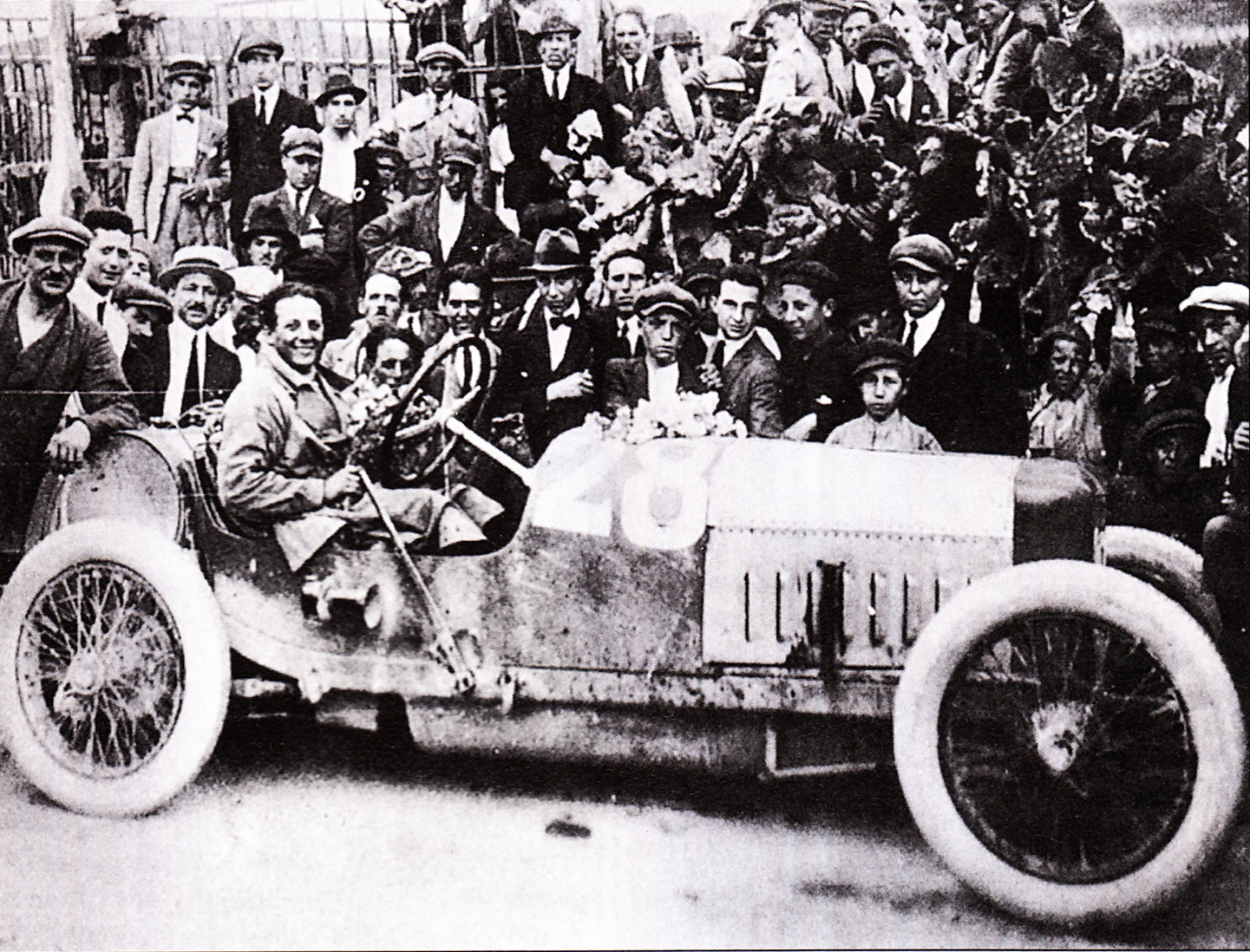
Giulio Masetti, Targa Florio winner in his pre-war FIAT

Once again, a solid field lined up for the Indianapolis 500, but the European presence was reduced. Ballot only had a single car, for Ralph DePalma, and Peugeot just had a pair of cars for Howdy Wilcox and Jean Chassagne. Sunbeam had three cars for René Thomas, André Boillot and Ora Haibe while another for former champion Dario Resta did not eventuate.

Louis Chevrolet had a four-strong team in his new Frontenacs. After his brother had been killed at the end of the previous year, Tommy Milton had been brought in from Duesenberg to lead the team, that included veteran Ralph Mulford and the team's engineer-driver Cornelius van Ranst. The Duesenberg brothers entered a big team of seven cars with their new straight-eights. French veteran Albert Guyot joined Jimmy Murphy, Joe Boyer and Roscoe Sarles (both latterly of Frontenac).

For the third year running, DePalma set the fastest qualifying lap, sharing the front row with Milton's Frontenac and Ira Vail’s Miller-engined special. DePalma led for the first half of the race, but then he got tied up trying to lap Thomas's Sunbeam. In the process he damaged his engine and had to retire. This moved Milton's Frontenac into the lead with Sarles in second. The Duesenberg pit vigorously exhorted Sarles to chase down Milton. To prove a point to his former team, Milton slowed to let him pass before blasting straight back around him and then cruised off to take a comfortable victory of nearly four minutes. Only eight cars finished the race, with Bennett Hill finishing 45 minutes behind Milton in 7th. Frontenac and Duesenberg dominated the results and the only European car to finish this year was Haibe's Sunbeam in 5th.

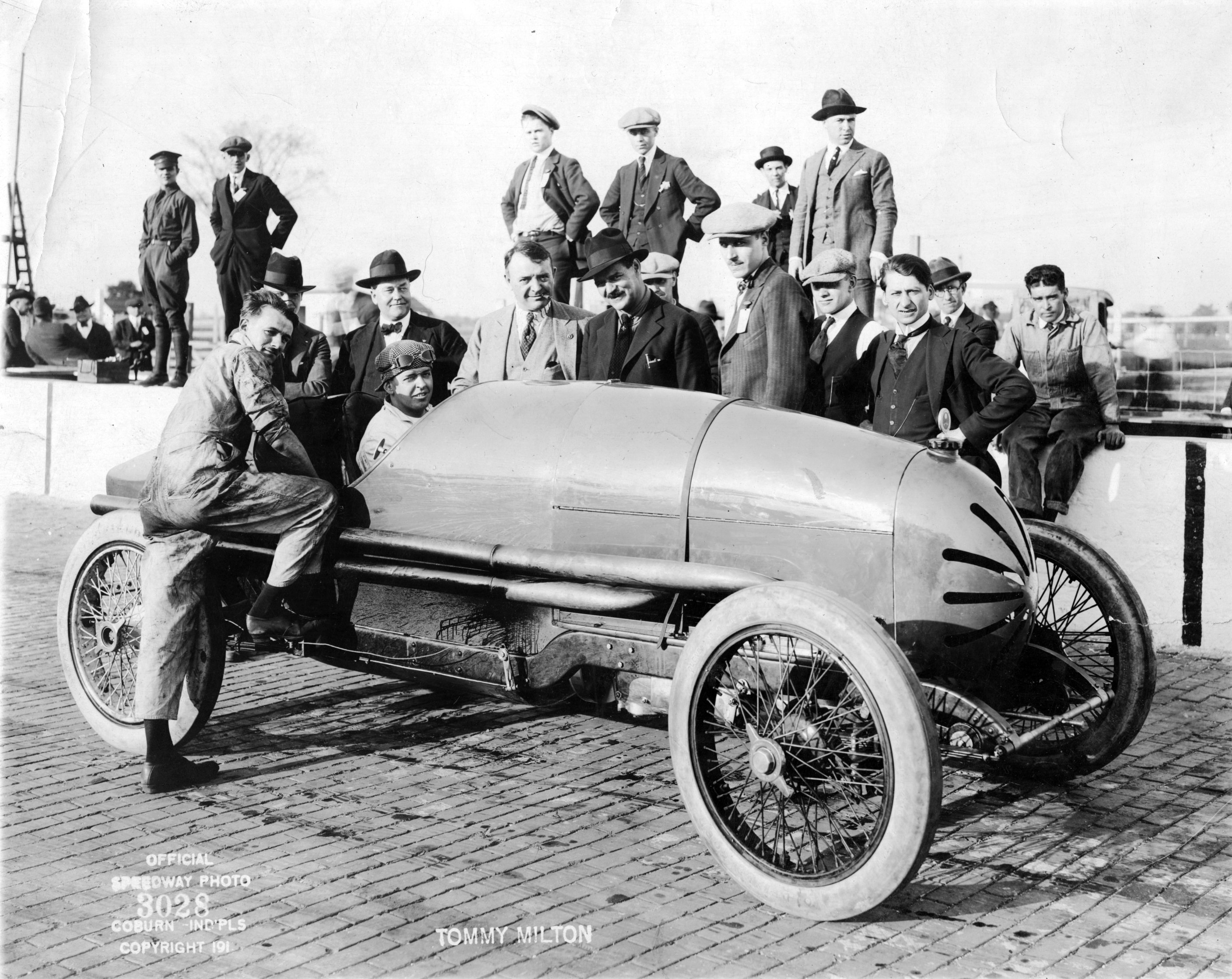
Tommy Milton, in his winning Frontenac

Three wins, five seconds and competing in 19 of the 20 Championship races (more than any other driver), gave Milton sufficient points to comfortably win the 1921 AAA championship from Sarles and Eddie Hearne when it was retroactively calculated in 1927.

Without doubt, the premier event of the year was the return of the French Grand Prix, in what promised to be an exciting showdown between some of the best cars from Europe and the United States. The ACO, having held the Coupe des Voiturettes the previous year on its new circuit just south of Le Mans, was awarded the honour of the first post-war Grand Prix. A strong field was entered, with the favourites being the Ballot team. Louis Wagner, Chassagne and DePalma were in the 3-litre cars while Jules Goux ran a new 2-litre sports-car prototype.

Émile Mathis was the sole other French entrant with a car of his own manufacture. Still so close to war's end, German teams were not invited. The Anglo-French STD (Sunbeam) company had seven cars entered, however ten days out from the race Louis Coatalen, racing director realised the cars would not be prepared and withdrew the team. When the drivers protested he relented to let anyone who could be ready to race. In the event four started – those for René Thomas, André Boillot and Brooklands regulars Kenelm Lee Guinness and Henry Segrave - while another STD entrant, alcohol heir André Dubonnet, switched to Duesenberg to replace their injured driver, Inghilbert. FIAT had entered three of its new 802 models, including cars for Bordino, and Sivocci (formerly at Alfa Romeo). However industrial unrest in Italy prevented them being ready and delivered in time. When entries closed the list was quite short. Fred Duesenberg had been keen to send four cars across but could not afford the shipping costs. When French-American spark-plug manufacturer Albert Champion provided $60000 of sponsorship, their entries were gladly received. The works drivers of Murphy, Guyot and Boyer were supplemented by French driver Louis Inghilbert.

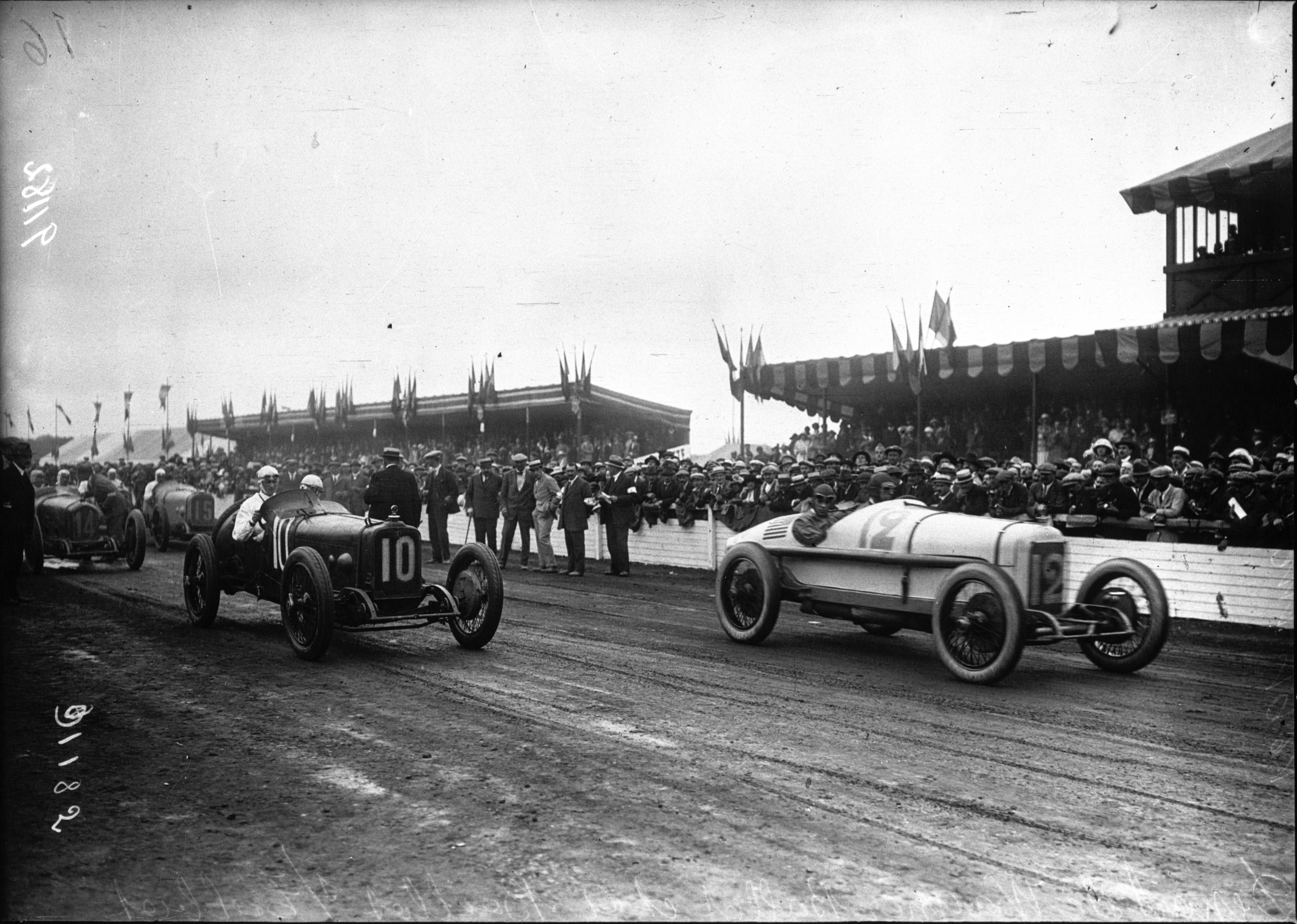
Henry Segrave (Sunbeam #10) & Jimmy Murphy (Duesenberg #12) starting the French GP together

The Duesenberg's hydraulic brakes caused quite a stir. While the Ballots had better handling, the Duesenbergs would be able to brake later at the Pontlieue and Mulsanne hairpins at the end of long straights. In practise the weight shifting caused many problems and when on a sighting lap with Inghilbert, Murphy crashed heavily. When Murphy's mechanic noticed the Ballot had smaller brakes at the rear, the team made a similar change and greatly improving performance. Meanwhile, Inghilbert had four broken ribs and could not race but Murphy, heavily bandaged up, discharged himself from hospital two hours before the race. In the Ballot camp, Édouard Ballot could not understand how DePalma was consistently faster than his local drivers. Then it was found that DePalma had moved the gear-lever in-board for his mechanic to do the gear-changes. This saved precious seconds down-shifting for the hard-braking corners. Ballot was furious and had the team work all night before the race to transfer the gear-lever back out to the driver's side.

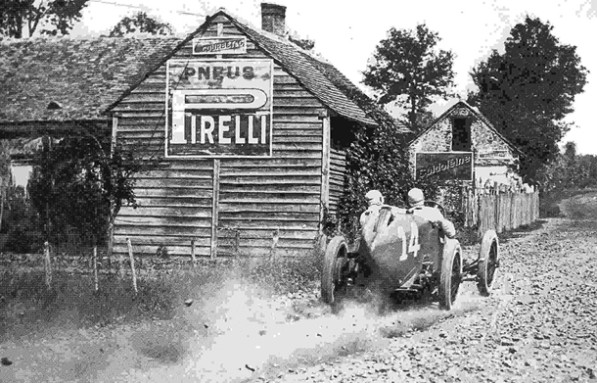
Wagner's Ballot in the French GP – note the rough stony sections of road

First away, DePalma (with his nephew Pete DePaolo beside him as mechanic) led at the start but the Duesenberg brakes soon proved themselves and by lap 7 Murphy had nearly an 8-minute lead over Boyer, allowing him to pit on lap 10 to change tyres and still come back out in the lead. Chassagne challenged briefly but he was sidelined with a broken fuel-tank. Then at half-distance the road surface started breaking up, throwing stones up. DePalma and Boyer suffered punctured radiators. Boyer subsequently retired from second on lap 18 with a broken conrod. Murphy's car was also hit and he had a puncture but had a sufficient gap to keep the lead. When another puncture happened on the last lap, Murphy was still able to come home for victory with his wheel on the rim. DePalma recovered, despite a leaking fuel-tank, to finish second a quarter-hour behind with his team-mate. Jules Goux's 2-litre Ballot was not far behind in third. But for the French it felt like another humiliation once again – after the German Mercedes team had beaten them in the last Grand Prix, in 1914. Jimmy Murphy became the first American to win both a Grand Prix and the Indianapolis 500, a feat not matched until Mario Andretti repeated it in 1971.

In September Italy's inaugural Grand Prix was the headline to open the Brescia Speed Week – a lavish festival of motor racing. It was held on the roads around Montichiari, between Brescia and Lake Garda. The circuit was roughly triangular: two straights, 5 and 6 km long met at a corner called the Parabolica and were connected at the base by a newly built 1.4 km length of road.

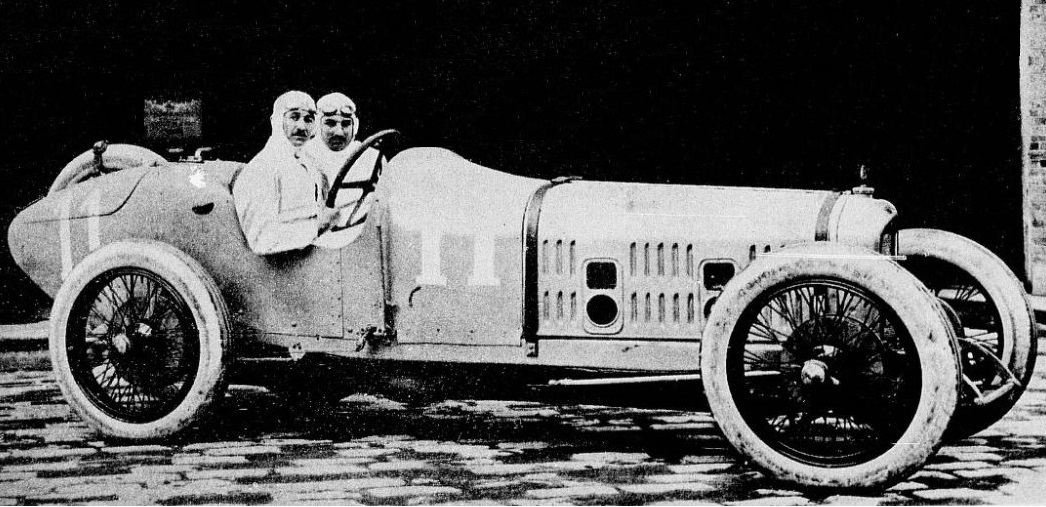
Jules Goux, winner of the first Italian GP, in his Ballot 3-litre

Giulio Masetti followed up his victory in the Targa Florio by winning the Gentlemen's Grand Prix (that included “gentlemen” like Nazzaro, Campari and Ascari). It also included the Contessa Maria-Antonietta d’Avanzo, who then went to win the Coppa delle Dame event.

For the advent of a prestigious new event from the initial 20 entries, it was a disappointing entry that only six cars started the Italian Grand Prix. Starting at 8am it would be run over 30 laps of the Montichiari circuit. The Duesenbergs had already returned to America. It became a contest between the three cars of the Ballot works team (Goux, Chassagne and a disgruntled DePalma) versus the FIAT works team. The new Tipo 802 was now prepared, and three cars were entered for Bordino, Sivocci and Louis Wagner. After a rapid start, Bordino held the lead for the first dozen laps – averaging a new world record 150 kp/h. However, on lap 13, he had to stop to change a tyre then two laps later the oil pump packed up. This left Goux in the lead and he took the victory five minutes ahead of teammate Chassagne with Wagner's FIAT the sole other finisher. Criticism was levelled on the Italian team and its drivers’ methods. Both teams were on Pirelli tyres but the French team drove more evenly (having no tyre stops) whereas the FIAT drivers were far more hard on braking and their tyres – Wagner needed seven tyre stops. The inexperience on Italian cars was put down, in part, to the lack of a permanent circuit to race, and test on.

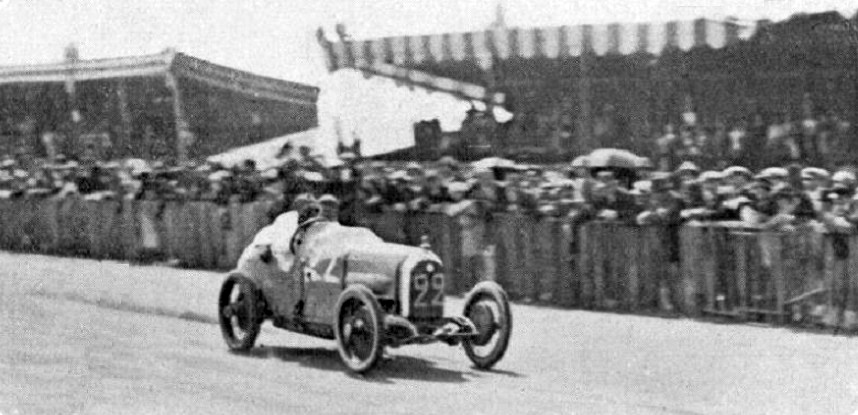
René Thomas winning the Coupe des Voiturettes

In voiturette racing, the Bugatti Type 22 had been the car to beat in the Italian races, with Eugenio Silvani winning the Circuito del Garda in Italy and Ernest Friderich at the Brescia Speed-week. In Paris, Talbot-Darracq had developed a new car by effectively using half the engine of the Sunbeam 3-litre Grand Prix car. Trials showed it was very fast and a good contest with the Bugattis was anticipated at the Coupe des Voiturettes. However, Ettore Bugatti, ever-mindful of the brand-image, scratched his team to prevent any loss of face from a race defeat. So, it proved an easy 1-2-3 finish for the Talbots, led by René Thomas. The result was repeated a month later at the first 200-mile race at Brooklands, with the win this time going to Henry Segrave.

At the end of September, Germany opened its new AVUS track in the south-west of Berlin. Built as a test circuit, it was essentially the two 9 km long straights of a motorway dual carriageway linked at each end by tight hairpins. Held in conjunction with the resumption of the IAA motor-show, the first race held there was won by Fritz von Opel in one of his own cars.

Despite the win in Italy, after two years Ballot had missed out on its big goals of the Grand Prix and Indianapolis. At the end of the season the team followed Peugeot, withdrawing from Grand Prix racing to focus on touring cars to better support its road-car sales. Ernest Henry moved onto the Sunbeam-Talbot-Darracq group. This was the end of the 3-litre formula and that meant a divergence between the racing in Europe and America. From now on there would be less and less interaction between the two continents. Also, a minor race on the island of Corsica would have a significant influence on future racing. Open to 4-seater 3-litre cars, it started the popular move into touring-car racing that would have a considerable impact in years to come.
