= Italian Grand Prix =

Formula One Grand Prix

- Autodromo Nazionale di Monza

Race information
- Number of times held: 97
- First held: 1921
- Most wins (drivers): (Germany) Michael Schumacher (United Kingdom) Lewis Hamilton (5)
- Most wins (constructors): (Italy) Ferrari (21)
- Circuit length: 5.793 km (3.600 miles)
- Race length: 306.720 km (190.596 miles)
- Laps: 53

Last race (2026)

Pole position
- (France) Pierre Gasly; Alpine-Mercedes; 1:21.786

Podium
- 1. (Italy) K. Antonelli; Mercedes; 1:51:15.281; 2. (United Kingdom) George Russell; Mercedes; +3.857; 3. (Netherlands) M. Verstappen; Red Bull Racing-Red Bull Ford; +14.718

Fastest lap
- (Italy) Kimi Antonelli; Mercedes; 1:23.504

The Italian Grand Prix (Italian: Gran Premio d'Italia) is the fifth oldest national motor racing Grand Prix (after the French Grand Prix, the United States Grand Prix, the Spanish Grand Prix and the Russian Grand Prix), having been held since 1921. Since 2013, the Grand Prix has been held the most times, with 97 editions as of 2026. It is one of the two Grands Prix (along with the British) which has run every season as an event of the Formula One World Championship Grands Prix, continuously since the championship was introduced in 1950. Every Formula One Italian Grand Prix in the World Championship era has been held at Monza except in 1980, when it was held at Imola.

The Italian Grand Prix counted toward the World Manufacturers' Championship from 1925 to 1928 and toward the European Championship from 1931 to 1932 and from 1935 to 1938. It was additionally designated the European Grand Prix seven times between 1923 and 1967, when this title was an honorary designation given each year to one Grand Prix race in Europe. Four editions before the World Championship were held in places other than Monza: Montichiari (1921), Livorno (1937), Milan (1947) and Turin (1948).

The event is due to take place at the Monza Circuit until at least 2031.

== History ==
=== Origins ===
The first Italian Grand Prix took place on 4 September 1921 at a 10.7-mile (17.3 km) circuit near Montichiari. However, the race is more closely associated with the course at Monza, a racing facility just outside the northern city of Milan, Italy's second largest city in its largest metropolitan area, its economic capital and Alfa Romeo's home. The circuit is specifically located in its namesake suburban town, which was built in 1922 in time for that year's race, and has been the location for most of the races over the years. Monza was built in the Parco di Monza, a public city park with a largely woodland setting, where the famous Royal Villa of Monza is also located.

==== Autodromo Nazionale di Monza ====
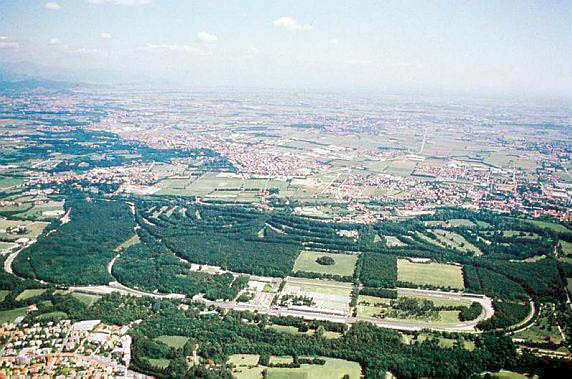
An aerial photograph of the Autodromo Nazionale di Monza.

The Autodromo Nazionale di Monza was completed in 1922 and was just the third permanent autodrome in the world at that time; Brooklands in England and Indianapolis in the United States were the two others. European motor racing pioneers Vincenzo Lancia and Felice Nazzaro laid the last two bricks at Monza. The circuit was 10 km (6.25 miles) long, with a flat banked section and a road circuit combined into one. It was fast, and always provided excitement. The 1923 race included one of Harry A. Miller's rare European appearances with his single seat "American Miller 122" driven by Count Louis Zborowski of Chitty Chitty Bang Bang fame. Zborowski was killed at the following year's Grand Prix at Monza driving a Mercedes.

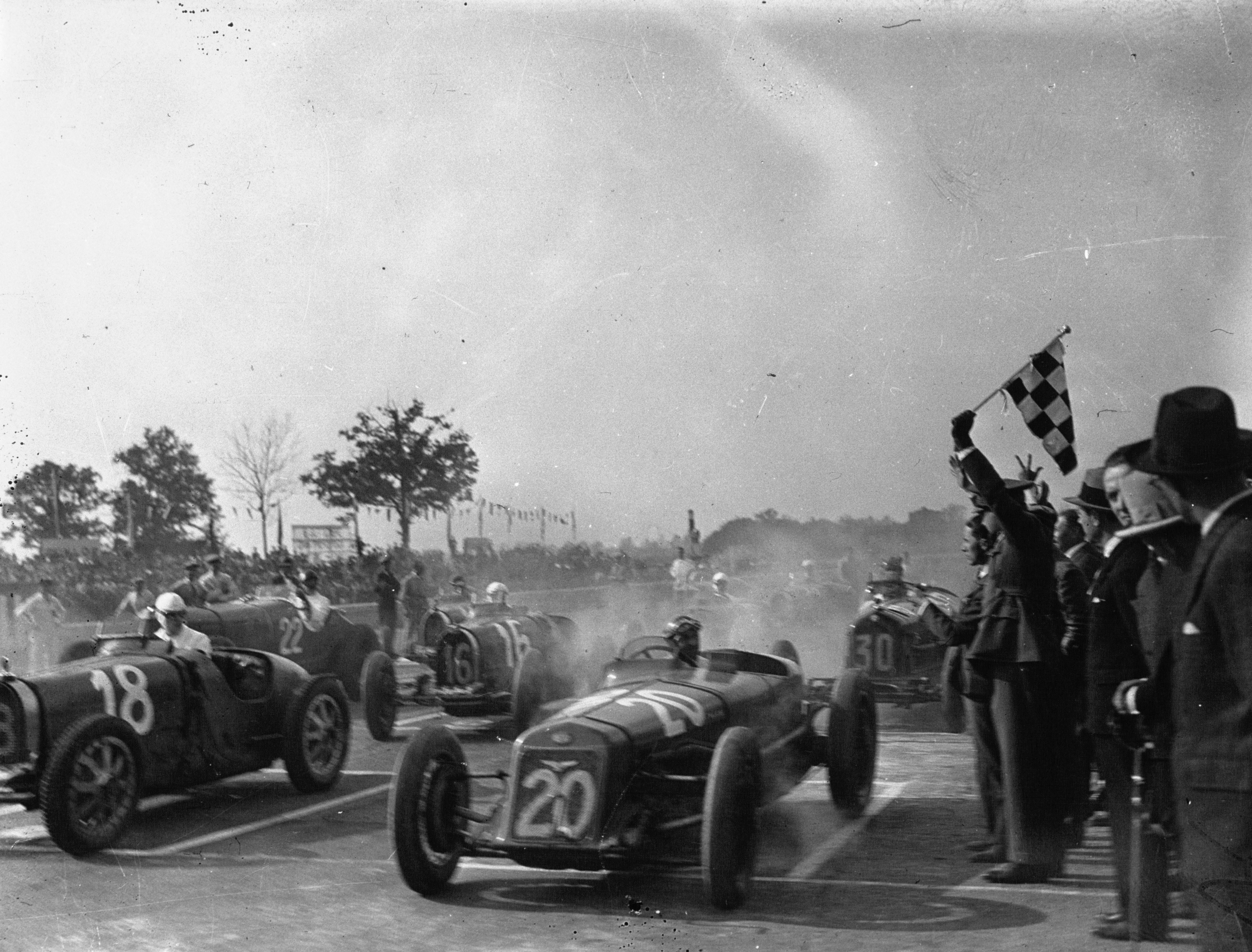
1931 GP race start

The 1928 race was the first of many tragedies that befell this venue. Italians Emilio Materassi in a Talbot and Giulio Foresti in a Bugatti were battling around the fast circuit. As they came off the banking onto the left side of the pit straight at 125 mph (200 km/h), one of the front wheels of Materassi's overtaking Talbot touched one of the rear wheels of the Bugatti. Materassi lost control of the car, swerved left, cleared a 15-foot wide and 10-foot deep ditch and ploughed into the unprotected grandstand opposite the pits, killing himself and 27 spectators, and injuring another 26. It was the worst accident in motor racing history and remained so until the 1955 24 Hours of Le Mans. The Italian Grand Prix went on a three-year hiatus (but the alternative non-championship Monza Grand Prix was run in 1929 and 1930) until the 1931 race, held in late May instead of the traditional early September, was won by Giuseppe Campari and Tazio Nuvolari, sharing an Alfa Romeo. The 1931 race was something of an endurance race; it took ten hours to complete. The great Nuvolari won again in a shortened 1932 race, this time held in early June.

=== The black day of 1933 ===
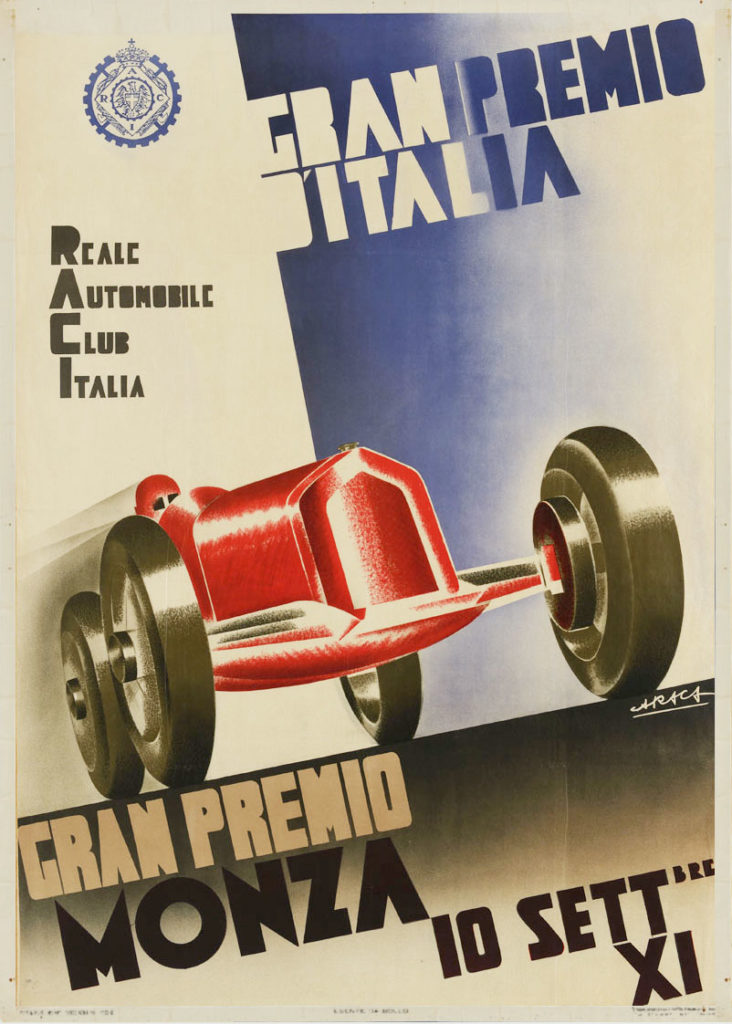
1933 poster

In 1933, with the race being held this time at the traditional timeframe of early September, disaster struck again. Three top drivers were killed during the course of the Monza Grand Prix, a Formula Libre race held over three heats and a final in the afternoon of 10 September, after the Italian Grand Prix itself had been held in the morning, on what became known as the "Black Day of Monza". During the second heat, there was a reported patch of oil on the south banking that had come from a Duesenberg, driven by Count Carlo Felice Trossi, and Giuseppe Campari in a Ferrari-entered Alfa Romeo and his protege Baconin Borzacchini in a Maserati were already battling ferociously; and Borzacchini and Campari went through the south banking on the first lap, wheel to wheel. Borzacchini went through the oily patch, lost control, spun wildly and the Maserati then overturned and violently flipped multiple times, and by the time the wrecked car came to a stop, Borzacchini was pinned underneath and was being crushed by his 850 kg (1,870 lb) car, not having been thrown out. And while Borzacchini's Maserati had been crashing all over the track, Campari swerved to avoid him, and by doing this, his car went up and flew off the banking and crashed into trees situated right next to the track. Campari broke his neck and was killed instantly, and Borzacchini died later that day in a Monza hospital.

Prior to the final, there was a drivers meeting to discuss the oil patch, and it was decided to clean it up. On the eighth lap, Polish aristocrat Count Stanislas Czaykowski was on the south banking when his Bugatti's engine blew up, and a fuel line then broke. The fuel from the Bugatti's tank caught fire after touching the very hot front section of the Bugatti where the engine and gearbox were and the burning fuel sprayed onto Czaykowski. Blinded by the smoke and flames on him, he went up and flew off the banking- at the same spot where Campari and Borzacchini had crashed. The Polish driver was unable to put out the flames on his body, which were fuelled by the fuel from his wrecked Bugatti. Czaykowski was unable to escape and he burned to death. Frenchman Marcel Lehoux in a Bugatti was declared the winner of the shortened event.

Enzo Ferrari, who had been close to Campari and Borzacchini; the former deciding to defect from Ferrari's team to Maserati, became hardened by this tragedy. Today, racing historians conclude that the events of this race marked a watershed, notably for Enzo Ferrari. It was the end to the joyful era of racing and the beginning of a harsher new age. Safety in those days was completely non-existent. The circuit's condition was virtually identical to that of an ordinary town and country road, except instead of the surface being made of dirt and/or tarmac, it was made of tarmac, concrete and/or bricks. Spectators often stood very close to or even next to the track and they had no protection of any kind other than common sense. What was particularly tragic about the 41-year old Campari's death was that he had announced his retirement at the French Grand Prix two months earlier, to focus on his opera singing exploits.

=== The Florio circuit and other locations ===
After the disastrous 1933 race, something had to be done to Monza. In 1934 a short version of Florio Circuit (introduced in 1930 for Monza Grand Prix) was used: the drivers had to start from the main straight but taking the south curve of the high speed ring (interrupted by a double chicane) in the opposite direction compared to the usual one; then, through the connection introduced a few years before by Florio, they took the central straight, the south curve (also interrupted by a chicane) and the main straight; finally a 180 ° hairpin turned back to the finish line. This configuration was considered too slow and since the following year Florio circuit (with five chicanes) was used. These races were at a time when Mercedes and Auto Union became involved in motor racing; the German Silver Arrows won all of these races; with superstar Rudolf Caracciola winning in 1934 and in 1937 when the Italian Grand Prix was held at a street circuit in Livorno. 1938 saw a return to Monza, which was won by Nuvolari driving a mid-engined Auto Union; just after the race renovation works began but in 1939 World War II broke out and the Italian Grand Prix did not return until 1947.

1947 saw the Italian Grand Prix being held at a fairgrounds park in the city of Milan's district of Portello, and this race was won by Italian Carlo Felice Trossi driving an Alfa Romeo. Italian Giovanni Bracco went off the road in his Delage and crashed into a group of spectators, killing five. This venue was never used again for racing, and 1948 saw it being held in Valentino Park, a public park in Turin. The 1949 race returned to Monza where it stayed for the next 30 years with the configuration ready before the war but never used yet.

=== Monza's redevelopments (1949–1979) ===
Monza's banking had been built over and only the road circuit was used, which had been modified slightly. The new long, fluid final corner was now two around 90-degree corners. 1949 saw Italian new-boy Alberto Ascari, son of the late 1924 Italian Grand Prix winner Antonio Ascari, win in his Ferrari; Enzo Ferrari was now building his own cars instead of running Alfa Romeos. 1950 saw the new Formula One Championship being established. The race and the first championship was won by Giuseppe "Nino" Farina, driving a supercharged Alfa Romeo 158. 1951 saw Ascari win again, after the competitive Alfas of Farina and Argentine Juan Manuel Fangio ran into engine problems. 1952 saw Ascari complete his domination of that season. 1953 Fangio won in a Maserati; although Ascari had already won the championship at the Swiss Grand Prix. 1954 turned out to be an interesting race; as up-and-comer Stirling Moss in a Maserati passed both Fangio's Mercedes and Ascari's Ferrari. The furious pace saw the retirement of Moss and Ascari and Fangio went on to win while Moss pushed his Maserati 250F over the line.

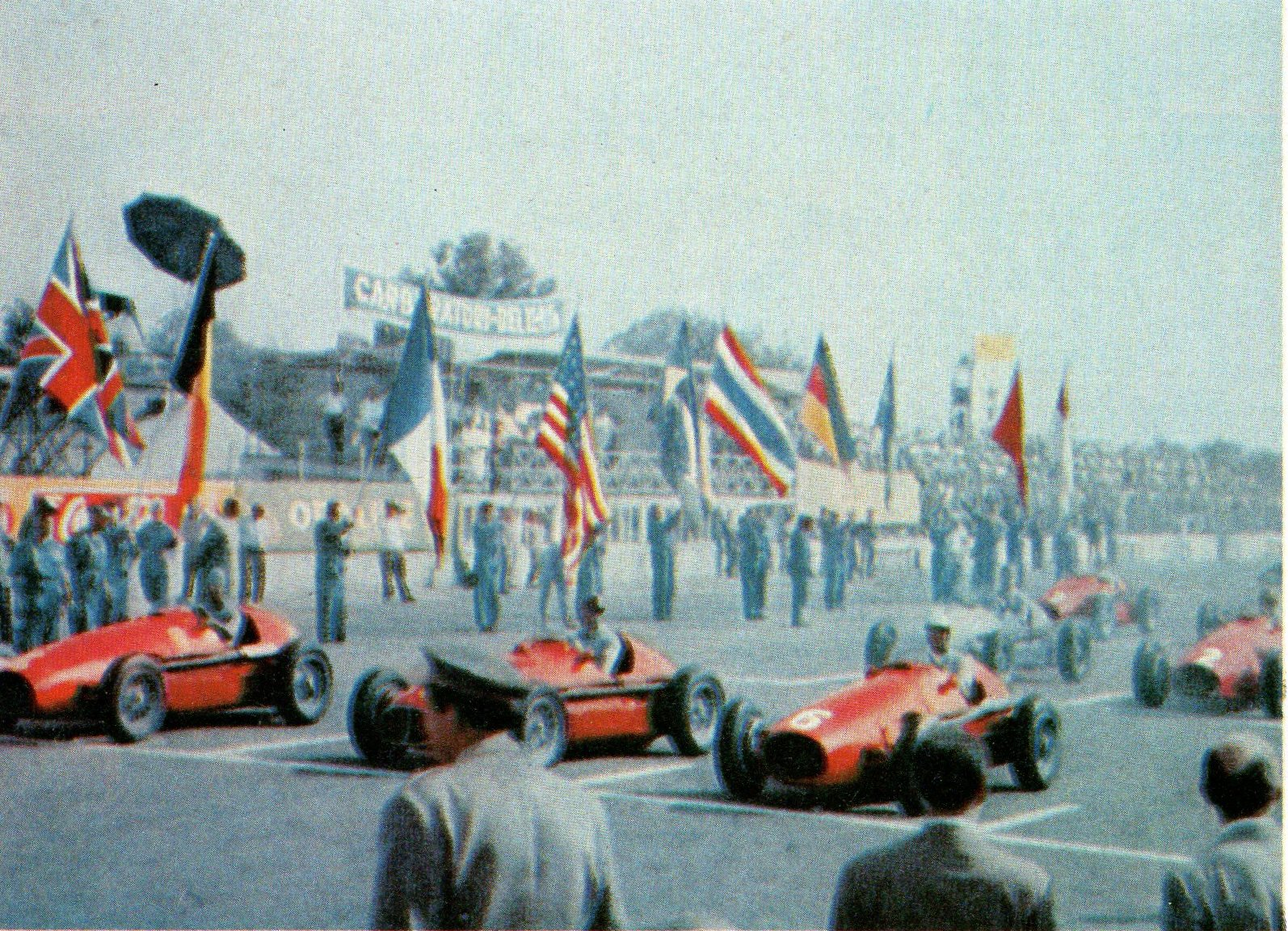
1953 GP race start

After the 1954 running, work began on entirely revamping the circuit. New facilities were built and a new corner, the Parabolica, was built right before the pits. Extra track used for a short course was eliminated. The biggest change was the construction of the new Monza banking. Built on top of where the almost flat, narrow original banking was, these huge concrete bankings, called the sopraelevata curves, were built in the same shape as the original banking had been. The only significant difference was that the Curva Sud was moved slightly to the north. This course was combined with the road course for the 1955 event, which was won by Fangio and was the last race contested by a full-fledged Mercedes factory effort in Formula One until 2010. The 10 km Monza circuit was now so fast that F1 cars were averaging 135+ mph per lap- though rather unremarkable by today's standards, these average speeds were even faster than the Indianapolis Speedway oval in the United States. 1956 saw an exciting race, with championship contenders Fangio, Briton Peter Collins (both in Ferraris) and Frenchman Jean Behra in a Maserati fight over the win. Stirling Moss was already out of championship contention; and Fangio retired with a broken steering arm. The Ferrari team called for Italian Luigi Musso to hand his car over to Fangio. Musso ignored the order so Collins came in and handed his car and his championship chances to Fangio. Behra had retired early with a magneto problem in his own car and took over his teammate Umberto Maglioli's car; but he retired that car, too. Musso ended up leading after Moss ran out of fuel coming through Vialone. Moss was able to refuel his car and storm off after Musso and eventually the Italian retired with steering problems, and Moss, with Fangio catching him up fast, stormed round the track to take victory. Fangio took second and his fourth Drivers' Championship.

1957 saw the organizers choose to use the road circuit only, as the rough, poorly constructed banking had caused problems for the Ferrari and Maserati cars the year before. Moss won again in a Vanwall, and Briton Tony Brooks won next year's race, and Moss won the 1959 event in a Cooper-Climax. 1960, however was not so straightforward. Ferrari with their front-engined cars, had lost out to the advanced mid-engined British cars. Seeing an opportunity, the Italian organizers decided to re-include the banking with the road circuit, making Monza even faster and more in favour to the powerful Ferraris. The British teams were unhappy as they cited the fragility of the banking, which was extremely rough, had a concrete surface instead of asphalt, was of very poor quality and was supported by stilts rather than solid bedrock; the argument being that it was too dangerous for Formula One cars. The British teams boycotted the race, so Ferrari had no competition. American Phil Hill took victory, in what was the last victory for a front-engined Formula One car.

1961 saw a return to the combined circuit, but it was to see yet another tragedy. Two Ferrari drivers, Hill and German count Wolfgang von Trips, came into the race with a chance at winning the championship. Fighting for fourth place while Hill was leading and while von Trips approached the Parabolica, the Briton Jim Clark slightly moved over into the path of the German and the two collided. Von Trips crashed into an embankment next to the road and then went flying into a crowd of people standing on it. Von Trips was thrown out of his car and was killed, as were 14 spectators. Clark survived but was hounded by Italian police for months after the incident. Hill won the race and the championship by one point. The race was not stopped, allegedly to assist rescue work for the injured.

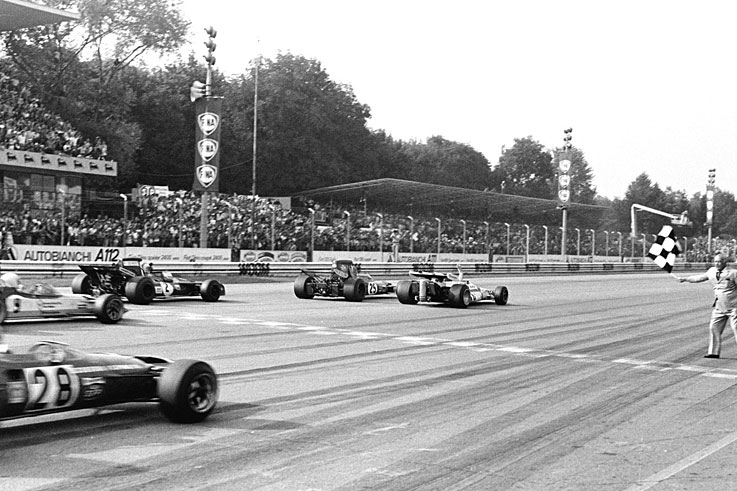
The end of 1971 GP

1962 saw a return to the road circuit only and the banking was never used again for Formula One. It still stands, but in decrepit condition for a long time before being restored in the early 2010s; the last time it was used was in 1969 for the 1000 kilometre sports car race that year. Briton Graham Hill won the race, and won the Drivers' Championship in South Africa soon afterward. 1963 saw an attempted use of the extremely fast full circuit again, and the drivers ran the course during Friday practice but the concrete banking was so rough and bumpy that cars were being mechanically torn apart. It was feared that there would be no finishers for the race itself. Briton Bob Anderson's Lola crashed after losing a wheel on the banking, although he was not injured); the drivers then threatened to walk off unless they raced on the road circuit only, which is what happened. Jim Clark won the race in a Lotus. Ferrari driver John Surtees won in 1964, and Briton Jackie Stewart won his first of 27 Grand Prix victories in 1965, driving for BRM. Against team orders, he fought hard with his teammate Graham Hill, Hill made a mistake at the Parabolica and Stewart was in command; this was all to the chagrin of team boss Tony Rudd. 1966 saw Italian Ludovico Scarfiotti win, and no other Italian won the race until 2026. 1967 was to be a race of interest and was to produce the first of three close finishes on the fast Monza circuit over the next four years. Surtees, now driving for Honda, battled with Australian Jack Brabham, and Surtees won the race by two-tenths of a second; and Clark, who had problems at the beginning of the race and lost a whole lap, stormed around the circuit, equalled his pole position time and unlapped himself to take the lead- but his fuel pump broke and he coasted over the line to finish third. 1969 saw four drivers; Stewart, Austrian Jochen Rindt, Frenchman Jean-Pierre Beltoise and New Zealander Bruce McLaren battle right down to the line. Stewart came out on top and beat Rindt by eight-hundredths of a second. The four drivers were all within two-tenths of a second of each other. With this win, Stewart won his first of three championships.1970 saw Rindt's fatal crash during qualifying at the wheel of his rear wing-less Lotus; his car suffered brake shaft failure, veered off the track, hit and went under the improperly-secured guardrail on the left and spun multiple times. Rindt died not because of the impact but because he had not properly secured his seat belts and the buckle had slit his throat. Rindt became the only posthumous World Champion, after Ferrari driver Jacky Ickx failed to overhaul Rindt. Ickx's teammate Clay Regazzoni won the race, which saw 28 lead changes. 1971 was to see the third close finish in four years. Briton Peter Gethin, Swede Ronnie Peterson, Frenchman François Cevert, Briton Mike Hailwood and New Zealander Howden Ganley battled for the lead all race. On the last lap, Peterson got the inside line for the Parabolica, but Gethin got in front going alongside Peterson through the long right-hand corner, and beat Peterson to the checkered flag by the slimmest of margins; one-one hundredth of a second. Cevert and Hailwood finished within two-tenths and Ganley was half a second behind.

1972 saw changes to Monza. The 1971 race was the fastest Formula One race ever at that point in time. It was really just a bunch of straights and fast corners and F1 cars had become increasingly advanced and much faster, and the drivers were constantly slipstreaming each other around the circuit. A small chicane was put at the end of the pit straight and another one at the Vialone curve; Brazilian Emerson Fittipaldi won that race and his first Drivers' Championship at only 25 years of age. His chief rival Jackie Stewart went out at the start with a broken gearbox. In 1973, Stewart punctured a tire early in the race and went into the pits to have it changed; he came out in 20th place and finished fourth in the race while Fittipaldi finished second; this was enough for Stewart to win his third and final Drivers' Championship. 1974 saw further changes with the Vialone chicane changed and renamed Variante Ascari, which was the place where Alberto Ascari was killed in 1955 testing a Ferrari sportscar. Like the year before, Peterson won and Fittipaldi finished second, now driving for McLaren. 1975, however, was an event to remember. Ferrari, which had regrouped completely under the leadership of Luca di Montezemolo, reached the high point of its resurgence.

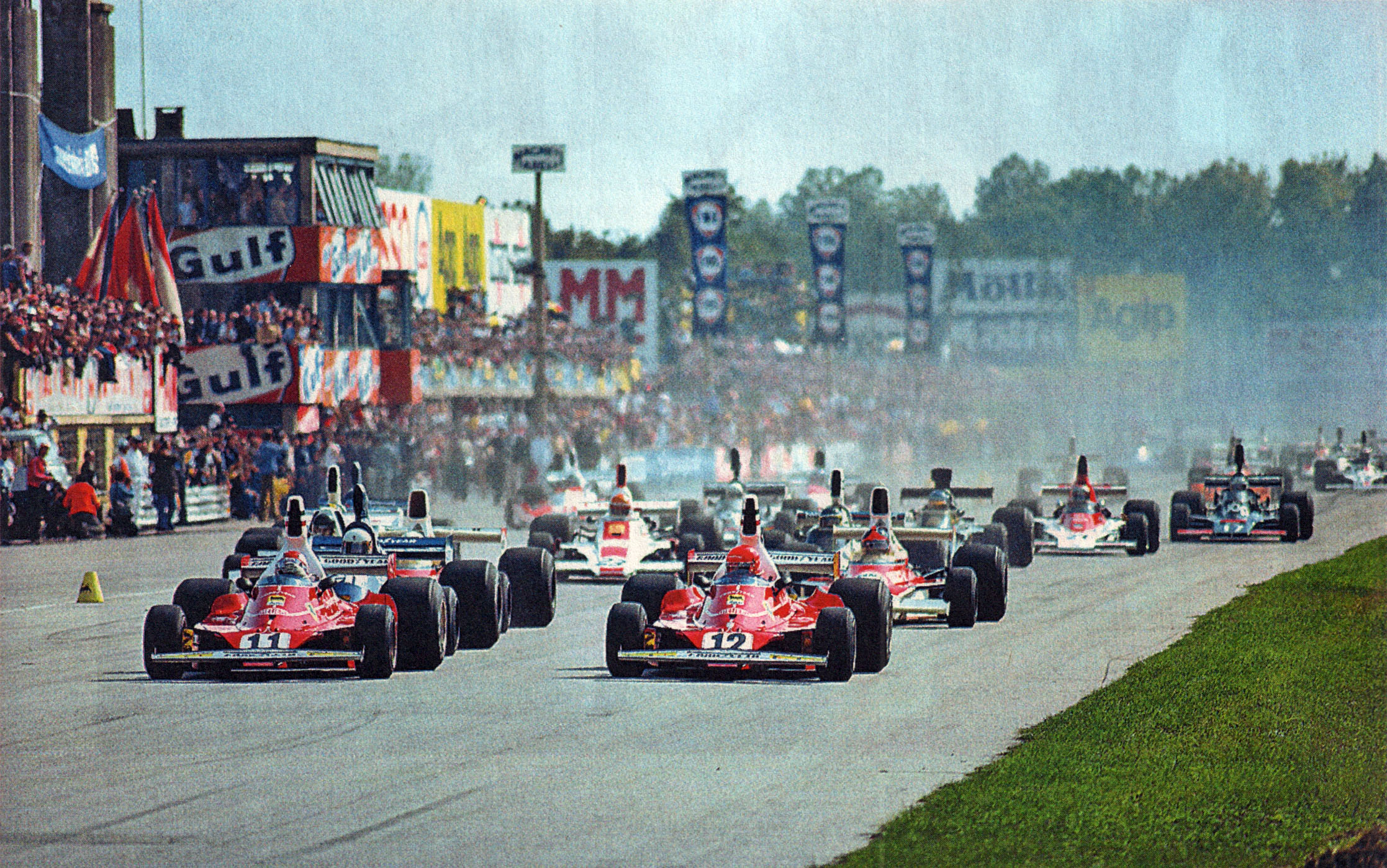
1975 GP race start

The Ferrari camp was feeling relaxed while rising star and championship leader Niki Lauda was leading the Drivers' Championship, and the team was leading the Constructors' Championship. Fittipaldi and Argentine Carlos Reutemann had to win in order to have a chance at staying in the championship chase. When the race started, Lauda's teammate Clay Regazzoni took the lead, with Lauda following; and Fittipaldi stormed round the circuit in an effort to catch the two Ferraris. Fittipaldi passed Lauda for second but this did not matter as Lauda only needed fifth to secure the drivers' title. Regazzoni took victory, followed by Fittipaldi and Lauda, who won his first drivers' title and Ferrari also won the Constructors' Championship at the same event. 1976 saw further changes to Monza's layout. Two chicanes, called Variante Rettifilo were installed just before the Curva Grande, and another chicane, the Variante della Roggia, was installed just before the Lesmo bends. Lauda, who had come back to racing only six weeks after his horrendous crash at the Nürburgring; finished fourth while Peterson won. 1977 saw Italian-American Mario Andretti win in a Lotus; but the next year's race was to add another page of tragedy to Monza's history.

Peterson had re-joined Lotus at the beginning of the 1978 season and had challenged his teammate Andretti all the way. Peterson had crashed his car in practice, and had to use Andretti's spare car, not a comfortable fit for the tall Swede, in contrast to the diminutive American. As the race started, there was a huge, fiery multi-car pile-up on the approach to the first corner. One of the victims was Peterson; his car slammed head-on into the Armco barriers and had caught fire. Instead of the ill-equipped marshals, Briton James Hunt, with the help of Frenchman Patrick Depailler and Regazzoni ran towards Peterson's aid and pulled him out of the burning Lotus. Peterson suffered severe leg injuries, and he died from embolism complications a day later. With Peterson's retirement from the race, Andretti won the Drivers' Championship. The race itself was an interesting one; during the parade lap South African Jody Scheckter lost a wheel from his Wolf at the second Lesmo curve and hit an Armco barrier right next to the track. Andretti, Hunt, Lauda, Fittipaldi and Reutemann went to inspect the damage, and they refused to start until it had been repaired; and it was repaired in time; although the race started well after it was supposed to. The cars were shown the green light while the back half of the field was still in motion (this often happened at Monza and it had happened during the first start); and due to the visible excitement of the start official Andretti and Canadian Gilles Villeneuve jumped the start and were penalised a minute; Lauda went on to take victory in his Alfa-powered Brabham in a shortened race distance; it was getting dark by the time the checkered flag was shown to the Austrian driver. 1979 saw changes to Monza, run off areas were added to the Curva Grande and Lesmo corners and the track was upgraded. Scheckter, now driving for Ferrari, won the race and the Drivers' Championship.

=== Imola 1980 and Monza's further redevelopments ===
In 1979, it was announced that the Autodromo Dino Ferrari, also known as Imola, would host the Italian Grand Prix for 1980 while Monza underwent a major upgrade, including building a new pit complex. The Imola circuit had been used for a non-championship event in 1979 and had hosted a variety of non-championship races since 1953; this circuit was closer to the Ferrari factory in Maranello. Imola's one-time running of the Italian GP was won by Brazilian Nelson Piquet after the two turbo Renaults of Jean-Pierre Jabouille and René Arnoux retired.

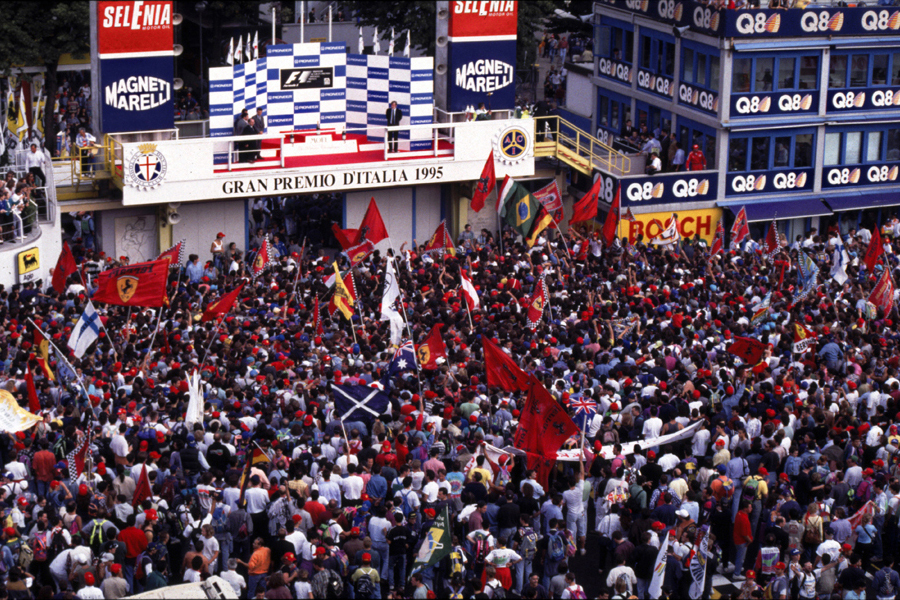
The podium ceremony at the 1995 GP

The Italian Grand Prix returned to Monza for 1981, and it has stayed there ever since. The Imola circuit was not to leave Formula One, it hosted the San Marino Grand Prix from 1981 to 2006. The 1981 Italian Grand Prix was won by rising star Alain Prost, and that race saw Briton John Watson have a huge accident at the second Lesmo Curve which also took out Italian Michele Alboreto. Watson was uninjured in his carbon-fibre McLaren. 1982 was won by Prost's teammate René Arnoux; and Prost also won the exciting 1985 event, this time driving a McLaren.

Prost's championship rivals Alboreto (now driving a Ferrari) and Finn Keke Rosberg in a Williams both retired. 1988 saw a memorable win; as McLaren had won every race up to the Italian Grand Prix; Prost had gone out with engine problems and his teammate Ayrton Senna had crashed into a backmarker with two laps to go- and Austrian Gerhard Berger in a Ferrari took victory, followed by Alboreto to make it a Ferrari 1–2. This was particularly memorable because Enzo Ferrari had died a month before this event.

1989 saw Prost win after the Honda engine in Senna's McLaren expired; but Senna took victory the following year. 1991 saw a battle between Senna and the two Williams drivers of Nigel Mansell and Riccardo Patrese. Mansell won, Senna finished 2nd and Patrese went out with gearbox problems. Senna won again in 1992, and 1993 saw Williams drivers Alain Prost and Damon Hill battle hard, and while leading, Prost's engine failed and Hill went on to take victory.

In response to the Imola tragedies in 1994, the second Lesmo curve was slowed down but the race risked being canceled due to the bureaucratic and environmental difficulties of modifying the track. Other changes were made in 1995 at Curva Grande, Variante della Roggia and both Lesmo Corners, which were anticipated for to create wider runoff areas. 1996 saw Michael Schumacher win for Ferrari, and 1999 saw championship leader Mika Hakkinen crash and the Finn, false to temperament, went behind a few bushes in the circuit and broke down crying. 2000 saw further changes to the circuit, which have stayed since; the Variante Rettifilo was made into a two corner sequence instead of a three corner sequence. The race that year started off tragically, as an accident during the start at the Variante della Roggia resulted in a marshal being struck in the head and chest by a loose wheel from German Heinz-Harald Frentzen's Jordan. 33-year-old Paolo Gislimberti was given a heart massage at the scene, but later died from his injuries. On a more positive note, the decade also started off with a romp of Ferrari victories, winning in 2000 and 2002–2004.

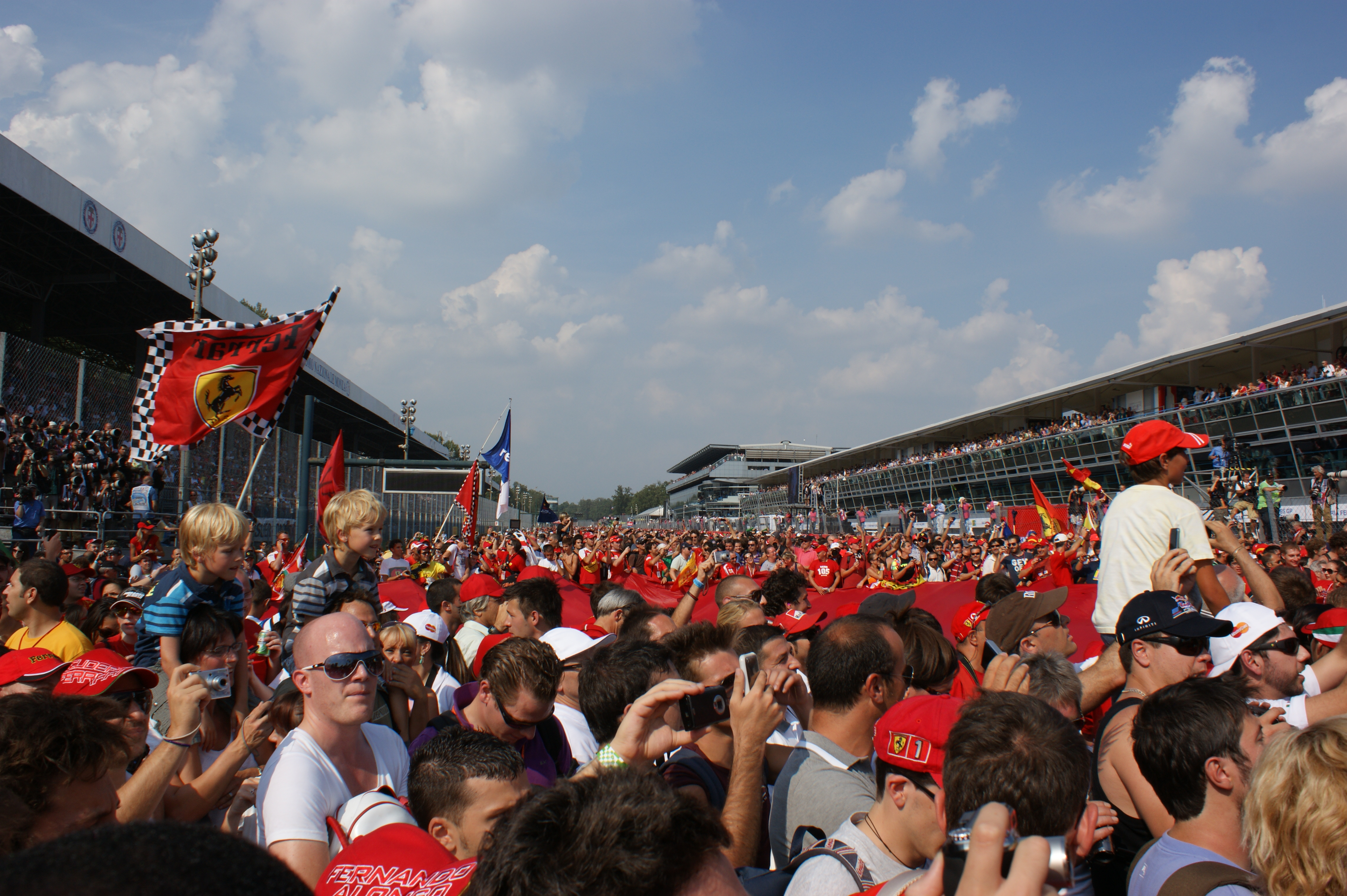
The fans' invasion at the end of 2011 GP

After winning the 2006 Italian Grand Prix, Michael Schumacher announced his retirement from Formula 1 racing at the end of the 2006 season. Kimi Räikkönen replaced him at Ferrari from the start of the 2007 season. At the 2008 Italian Grand Prix, Sebastian Vettel became the youngest driver in history to win a Formula One Grand Prix. Aged 21 years and 74 days, Vettel broke the record set by Fernando Alonso at the 2003 Hungarian Grand Prix by 317 days as he won in wet conditions at Monza.

Vettel led for the majority of the Grand Prix and crossed the finish line 12.5 seconds ahead of McLaren's Heikki Kovalainen. Earlier in the weekend, he had already become the youngest pole sitter, after setting the fastest times in both Q2 and Q3 qualifying stages. His win also gave him the record of youngest podium-finisher. Vettel also won in 2011, after a spectacular pass at the Curva Grande, passing Fernando Alonso on the outside of the big, long curve.

Uncertainty grew over the fact that Monza would continue to host the race as Rome had signed a deal to host Formula One from 2012. On 18 March 2010 however, Bernie Ecclestone and the Monza track managers signed a deal which assured the race being held there until at least 2016.

A total of twelve Italian drivers have won the Italian Grand Prix; seven before World War II and five when it was part of the World Championship; most recently Kimi Antonelli won in 2026. Alberto Ascari won the race three times (once before Formula One and twice during the Formula One championship). Elio de Angelis and Riccardo Patrese both won the San Marino Grand Prix in 1985 and 1990 respectively, so they won on home soil but not at Monza. Both Michael Schumacher and Lewis Hamilton have won the Italian Grand Prix five times and Nelson Piquet has won it four times. Ferrari have won their home Grand Prix 20 times, the most recent being Charles Leclerc in 2024.

The 2025 Italian Grand Prix saw the fastest ever qualifying lap, set by Max Verstappen in a Red Bull car in a time of 1:18.792 at an average speed of 264.681 km/h (164.465 mph), as well as the fastest ever lap during the race, set by Lando Norris in a McLaren car in a time of 1:20.901 at an average speed of 257.781 km/h (160.178 mph). The Grand Prix also set the record for the duration of the shortest race, running for 1:13:24.325 at an average speed of 250.706 km/h (155.781 mph).

== Winners ==
=== By year ===
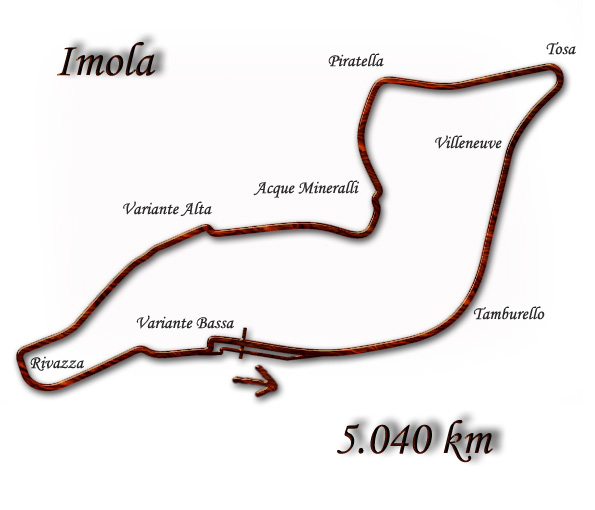
Imola circuit used in 1980

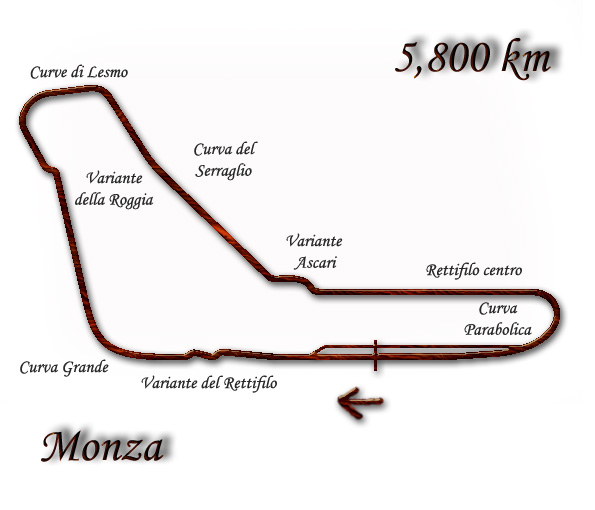
Monza (albeit some changes) used in 1976–1999

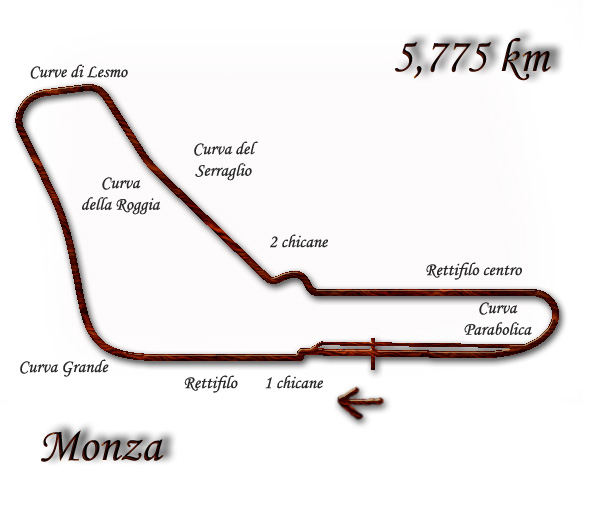
Monza (with re-profiling of the Variante Ascari in 1974) used in 1972–1975

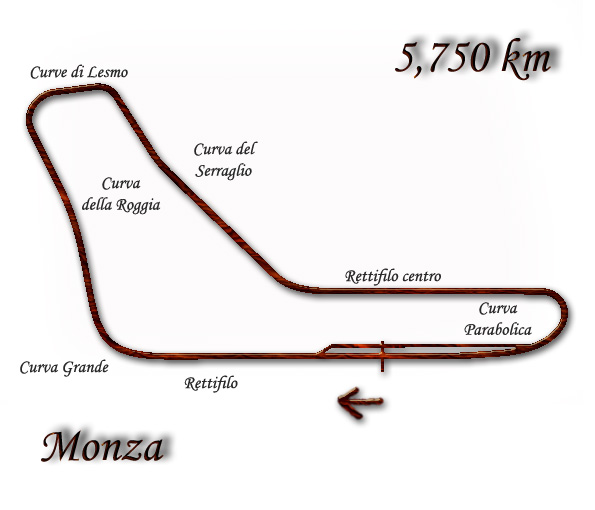
Monza used from 1957 to 1959 and 1962–1971

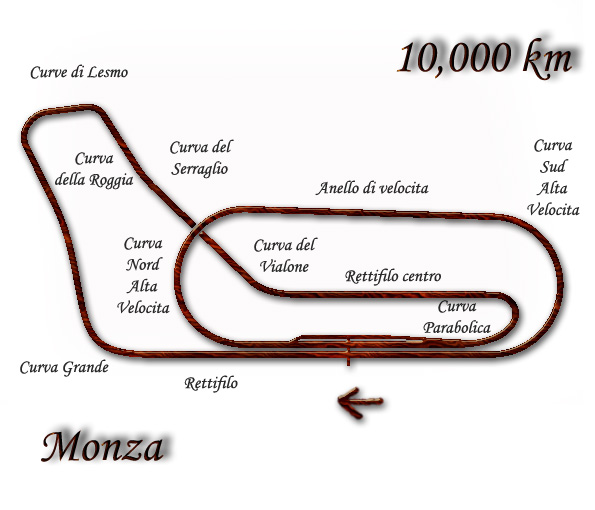
The combined Monza circuit, used in 1955–1956 and 1960–1961

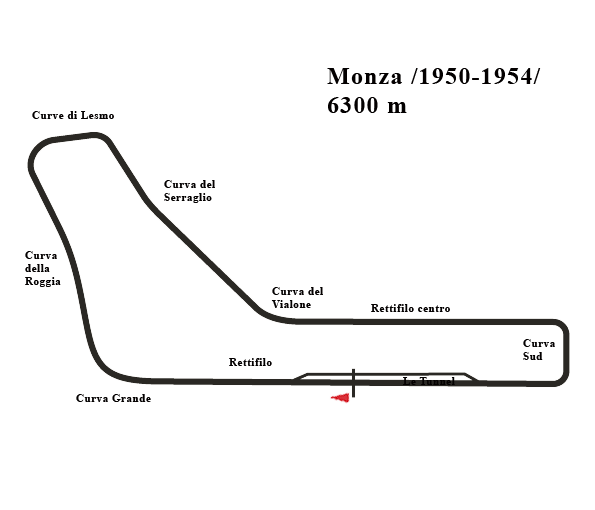
Monza used in 1948–1954

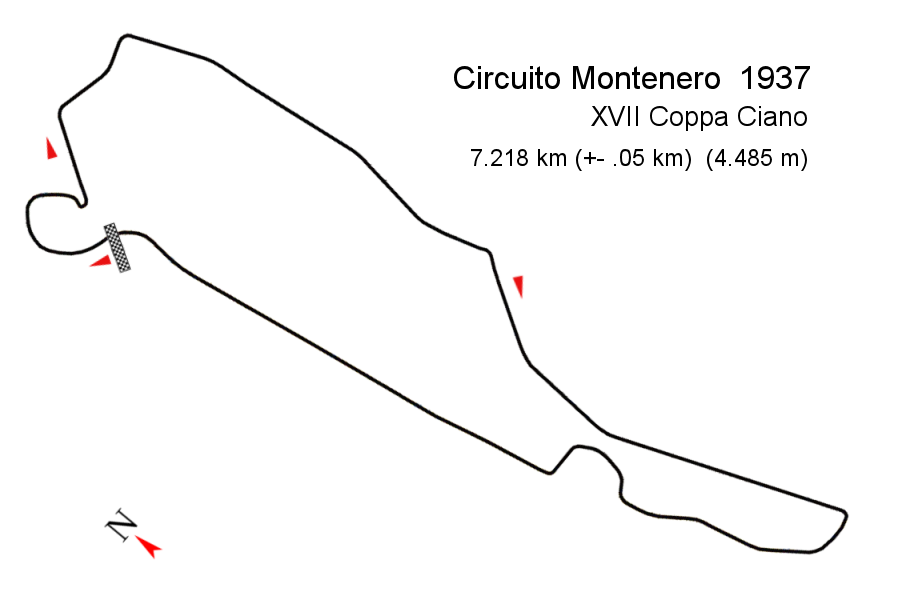
Livorno circuit used in 1937

Monza used in 1935–1936 (with the five chicanes showed in the map) and in 1938 (with the last chicane only)

Monza used in 1922–1933

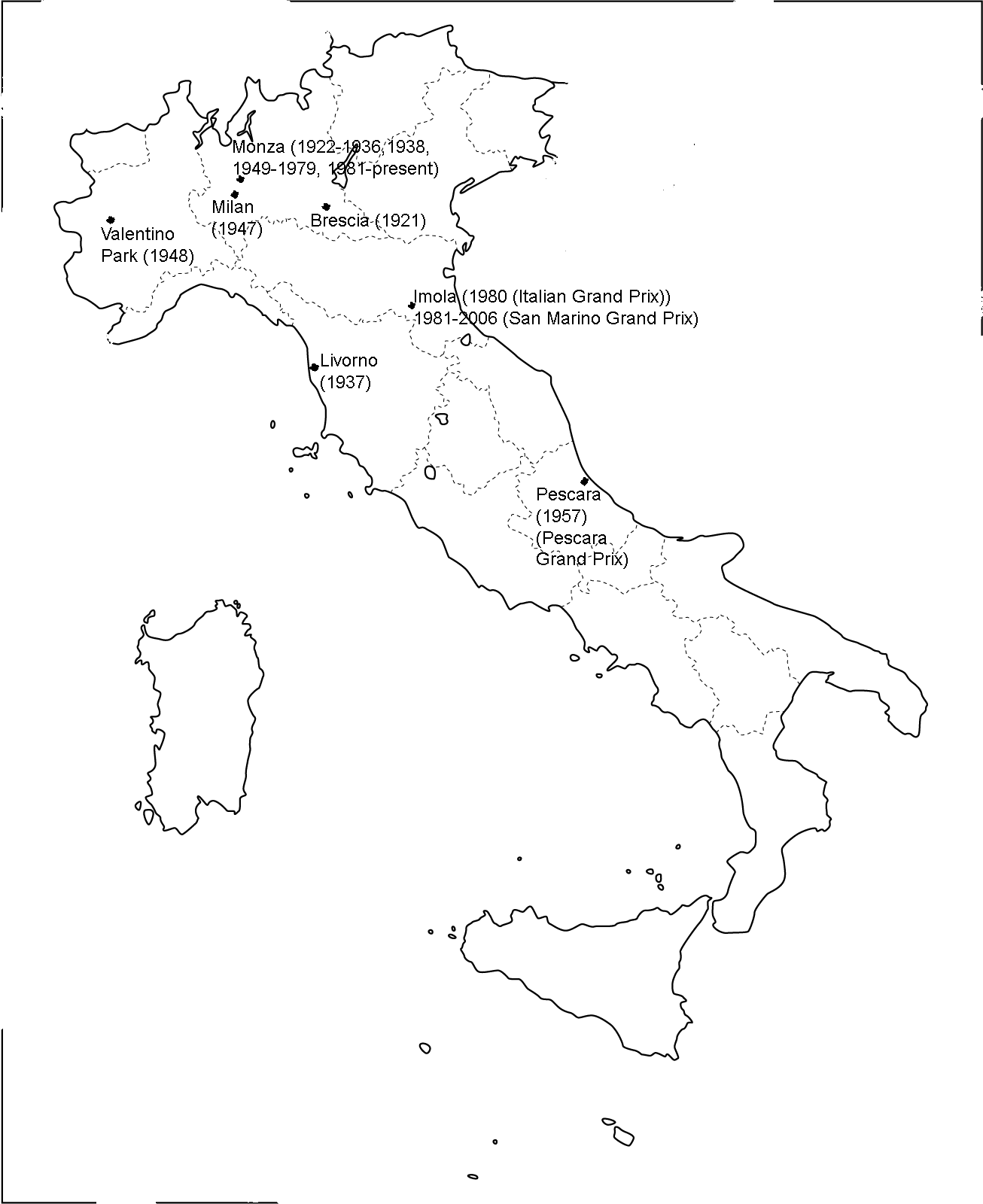
A map of all the locations of the Italian Grand Prix

A pink background indicates an event which was not part of any championship.
A yellow background indicates an event which was part of the pre-war European Championship.
A green background indicates an event which was part of the pre-war World Manufacturers' Championship.

Year	Driver	Constructor	Location	Report
1921	(France) Jules Goux	Ballot	Montichiari	Report
1922	(Italy) Pietro Bordino	Fiat	Monza	Report
1923	(Italy) Carlo Salamano	Fiat	Monza	Report
1924	(Italy) Antonio Ascari	Alfa Romeo	Monza	Report
1925	(Italy) Gastone Brilli-Peri	Alfa Romeo	Monza	Report
1926	(France) Louis Charavel	Bugatti	Monza	Report
1927	(France) Robert Benoist	Delage	Monza	Report
1928	(Monaco) Louis Chiron	Bugatti	Monza	Report
1929 – 1930	Not held due to a hiatus following Emilio Materassi and Giulio Foresti's crash in the 1928 race, which killed Materassi and 27 spectators, and injured 26 spectators.			
1931	(Italy) Giuseppe Campari (Italy) Tazio Nuvolari	Alfa Romeo	Monza	Report
1932	(Italy) Tazio Nuvolari	Alfa Romeo	Monza	Report
1933	(Italy) Luigi Fagioli	Alfa Romeo	Monza	Report
1934	(Italy) Luigi Fagioli (Germany) Rudolf Caracciola	Mercedes-Benz	Monza	Report
1935	(Germany) Hans Stuck	Auto Union	Monza	Report
1936	(Germany) Bernd Rosemeyer	Auto Union	Monza	Report
1937	(Germany) Rudolf Caracciola	Mercedes-Benz	Livorno	Report
1938	(Italy) Tazio Nuvolari	Auto Union	Monza	Report
1939 – 1946	Not held due to World War II			
1947	(Italy) Carlo Felice Trossi	Alfa Romeo	Milan	Report
1948	(France) Jean-Pierre Wimille	Alfa Romeo	Turin	Report
1949	(Italy) Alberto Ascari	Ferrari	Monza	Report
1950	(Italy) Giuseppe Farina	Alfa Romeo	Monza	Report
1951	(Italy) Alberto Ascari	Ferrari	Monza	Report
1952	(Italy) Alberto Ascari	Ferrari	Monza	Report
1953	(Argentina) Juan Manuel Fangio	Maserati	Monza	Report
1954	(Argentina) Juan Manuel Fangio	Mercedes	Monza	Report
1955	(Argentina) Juan Manuel Fangio	Mercedes	Monza	Report
1956	(United Kingdom) Stirling Moss	Maserati	Monza	Report
1957	(United Kingdom) Stirling Moss	Vanwall	Monza	Report
1958	(United Kingdom) Tony Brooks	Vanwall	Monza	Report
1959	(United Kingdom) Stirling Moss	Cooper-Climax	Monza	Report
1960	(United States) Phil Hill	Ferrari	Monza	Report
1961	(United States) Phil Hill	Ferrari	Monza	Report
1962	(United Kingdom) Graham Hill	BRM	Monza	Report
1963	(United Kingdom) Jim Clark	Lotus-Climax	Monza	Report
1964	(United Kingdom) John Surtees	Ferrari	Monza	Report
1965	(United Kingdom) Jackie Stewart	BRM	Monza	Report
1966	(Italy) Ludovico Scarfiotti	Ferrari	Monza	Report
1967	(United Kingdom) John Surtees	Honda	Monza	Report
1968	(New Zealand) Denny Hulme	McLaren-Ford	Monza	Report
1969	(United Kingdom) Jackie Stewart	Matra-Ford	Monza	Report
1970	(Switzerland) Clay Regazzoni	Ferrari	Monza	Report
1971	(United Kingdom) Peter Gethin	BRM	Monza	Report
1972	(Brazil) Emerson Fittipaldi	Lotus-Ford	Monza	Report
1973	(Sweden) Ronnie Peterson	Lotus-Ford	Monza	Report
1974	(Sweden) Ronnie Peterson	Lotus-Ford	Monza	Report
1975	(Switzerland) Clay Regazzoni	Ferrari	Monza	Report
1976	(Sweden) Ronnie Peterson	March-Ford	Monza	Report
1977	(United States) Mario Andretti	Lotus-Ford	Monza	Report
1978	(Austria) Niki Lauda	Brabham-Alfa Romeo	Monza	Report
1979	(South Africa) Jody Scheckter	Ferrari	Monza	Report
1980	(Brazil) Nelson Piquet	Brabham-Ford	Imola	Report
1981	(France) Alain Prost	Renault	Monza	Report
1982	(France) René Arnoux	Renault	Monza	Report
1983	(Brazil) Nelson Piquet	Brabham-BMW	Monza	Report
1984	(Austria) Niki Lauda	McLaren-TAG	Monza	Report
1985	(France) Alain Prost	McLaren-TAG	Monza	Report
1986	(Brazil) Nelson Piquet	Williams-Honda	Monza	Report
1987	(Brazil) Nelson Piquet	Williams-Honda	Monza	Report
1988	(Austria) Gerhard Berger	Ferrari	Monza	Report
1989	(France) Alain Prost	McLaren-Honda	Monza	Report
1990	(Brazil) Ayrton Senna	McLaren-Honda	Monza	Report
1991	(United Kingdom) Nigel Mansell	Williams-Renault	Monza	Report
1992	(Brazil) Ayrton Senna	McLaren-Honda	Monza	Report
1993	(United Kingdom) Damon Hill	Williams-Renault	Monza	Report
1994	(United Kingdom) Damon Hill	Williams-Renault	Monza	Report
1995	(United Kingdom) Johnny Herbert	Benetton-Renault	Monza	Report
1996	(Germany) Michael Schumacher	Ferrari	Monza	Report
1997	(United Kingdom) David Coulthard	McLaren-Mercedes	Monza	Report
1998	(Germany) Michael Schumacher	Ferrari	Monza	Report
1999	(Germany) Heinz-Harald Frentzen	Jordan-Mugen-Honda	Monza	Report
2000	(Germany) Michael Schumacher	Ferrari	Monza	Report
2001	(Colombia) Juan Pablo Montoya	Williams-BMW	Monza	Report
2002	(Brazil) Rubens Barrichello	Ferrari	Monza	Report
2003	(Germany) Michael Schumacher	Ferrari	Monza	Report
2004	(Brazil) Rubens Barrichello	Ferrari	Monza	Report
2005	(Colombia) Juan Pablo Montoya	McLaren-Mercedes	Monza	Report
2006	(Germany) Michael Schumacher	Ferrari	Monza	Report
2007	(Spain) Fernando Alonso	McLaren-Mercedes	Monza	Report
2008	(Germany) Sebastian Vettel	Toro Rosso-Ferrari	Monza	Report
2009	(Brazil) Rubens Barrichello	Brawn-Mercedes	Monza	Report
2010	(Spain) Fernando Alonso	Ferrari	Monza	Report
2011	(Germany) Sebastian Vettel	Red Bull-Renault	Monza	Report
2012	(United Kingdom) Lewis Hamilton	McLaren-Mercedes	Monza	Report
2013	(Germany) Sebastian Vettel	Red Bull-Renault	Monza	Report
2014	(United Kingdom) Lewis Hamilton	Mercedes	Monza	Report
2015	(United Kingdom) Lewis Hamilton	Mercedes	Monza	Report
2016	(Germany) Nico Rosberg	Mercedes	Monza	Report
2017	(United Kingdom) Lewis Hamilton	Mercedes	Monza	Report
2018	(United Kingdom) Lewis Hamilton	Mercedes	Monza	Report
2019	(Monaco) Charles Leclerc	Ferrari	Monza	Report
2020	(France) Pierre Gasly	AlphaTauri-Honda	Monza	Report
2021	(Australia) Daniel Ricciardo	McLaren-Mercedes	Monza	Report
2022	(Netherlands) Max Verstappen	Red Bull-RBPT	Monza	Report
2023	(Netherlands) Max Verstappen	Red Bull-Honda RBPT	Monza	Report
2024	(Monaco) Charles Leclerc	Ferrari	Monza	Report
2025	(Netherlands) Max Verstappen	Red Bull-Honda RBPT	Monza	Report
2026	(Italy) Kimi Antonelli	Mercedes	Monza	Report

=== Repeat winners (drivers) ===
Drivers in bold are competing in the Formula One championship in 2026.
A pink background indicates an event which was not part of the Formula One World Championship.
A yellow background indicates an event which was part of the pre-war European Championship.

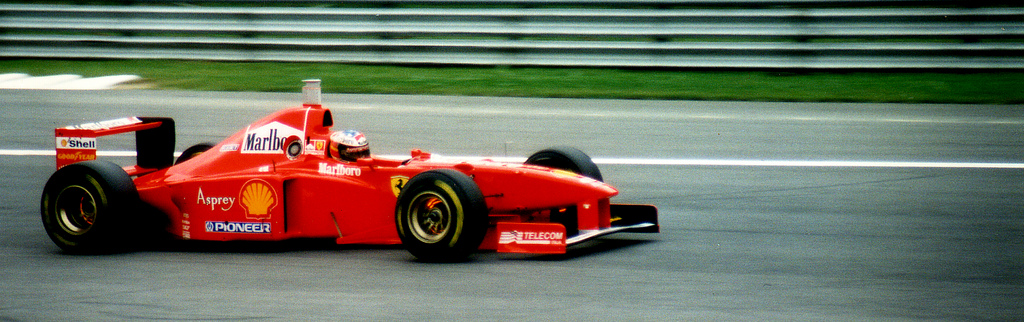
Michael Schumacher driving his Ferrari 310B at the 1997 Italian Grand Prix

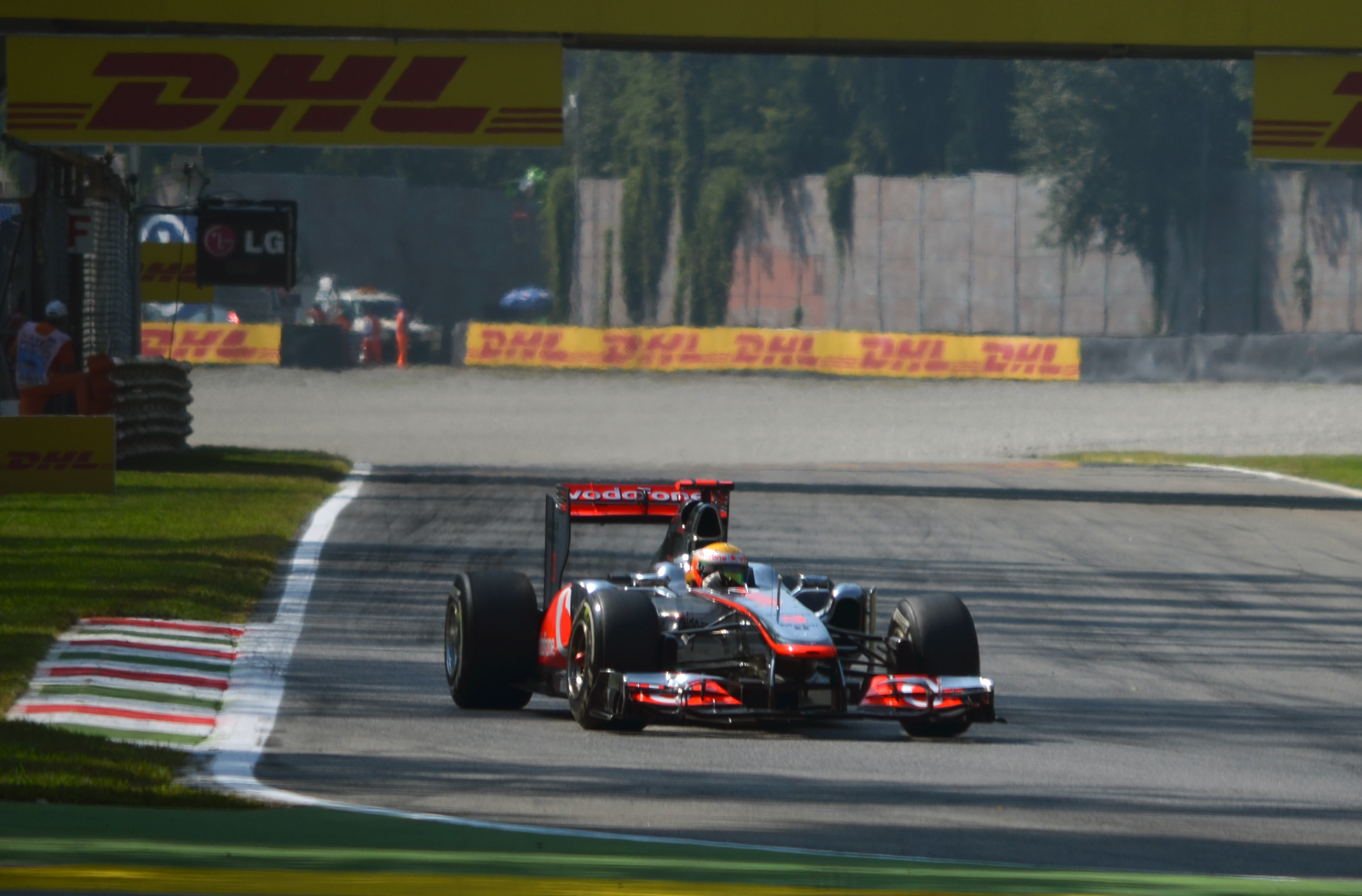
Lewis Hamilton turns into the Roggia chicane in the McLaren MP4-26 at the 2011 Italian Grand Prix

Wins	Driver	Years won
5	(Germany) Michael Schumacher	1996, 1998, 2000, 2003, 2006
5	(United Kingdom) **Lewis Hamilton**	2012, 2014, 2015, 2017, 2018
4	(Brazil) Nelson Piquet	1980, 1983, 1986, 1987
3	(Italy) Tazio Nuvolari	1931, 1932, 1938
3	(Italy) Alberto Ascari	1949, 1951, 1952
3	(Argentina) Juan Manuel Fangio	1953, 1954, 1955
3	(United Kingdom) Stirling Moss	1956, 1957, 1959
3	(Sweden) Ronnie Peterson	1973, 1974, 1976
3	(France) Alain Prost	1981, 1985, 1989
3	(Brazil) Rubens Barrichello	2002, 2004, 2009
3	(Germany) Sebastian Vettel	2008, 2011, 2013
3	(Netherlands) **Max Verstappen**	2022, 2023, 2025
2	(Italy) Luigi Fagioli	1933, 1934
2	(Germany) Rudolf Caracciola	1934, 1937
2	(United States) Phil Hill	1960, 1961
2	(United Kingdom) John Surtees	1964, 1967
2	(United Kingdom) Jackie Stewart	1965, 1969
2	(Switzerland) Clay Regazzoni	1970, 1975
2	(Austria) Niki Lauda	1978, 1984
2	(Brazil) Ayrton Senna	1990, 1992
2	(United Kingdom) Damon Hill	1993, 1994
2	(Colombia) Juan Pablo Montoya	2001, 2005
2	(Spain) **Fernando Alonso**	2007, 2010
2	(Monaco) **Charles Leclerc**	2019, 2024

=== Repeat winners (constructors) ===
Teams in bold are competing in the Formula One championship in 2026.
A pink background indicates an event which was not part of any championship.
A yellow background indicates an event which was part of the pre-war European Grand Prix Championship.
A green background indicates an event which was part of the pre-war World Manufacturers' Championship.

Wins	Constructor	Years won
21	(Italy) **Ferrari**	1949, 1951, 1952, 1960, 1961, 1964, 1966, 1970, 1975, 1979, 1988, 1996, 1998, 2000, 2002, 2003, 2004, 2006, 2010, 2019, 2024
11	(United Kingdom) **McLaren**	1968, 1984, 1985, 1989, 1990, 1992, 1997, 2005, 2007, 2012, 2021
10	(Germany) **Mercedes**	1934, 1937, 1954, 1955, 2014, 2015, 2016, 2017, 2018, 2026
8	(Italy) Alfa Romeo	1924, 1925, 1931, 1932, 1933, 1947, 1948, 1950
6	(United Kingdom) **Williams**	1986, 1987, 1991, 1993, 1994, 2001
5	(United Kingdom) Lotus	1963, 1972, 1973, 1974, 1977
5	(Austria) **Red Bull**	2011, 2013, 2022, 2023, 2025
3	(Germany) Auto Union	1935, 1936, 1938
3	(United Kingdom) BRM	1962, 1965, 1971
3	(United Kingdom) Brabham	1978, 1980, 1983
2	(Italy) Fiat	1922, 1923
2	(France) Bugatti	1926, 1928
2	(Italy) Maserati	1953, 1956
2	(United Kingdom) Vanwall	1957, 1958
2	(France) Renault	1981, 1982

=== Repeat winners (engine manufacturers) ===
Manufacturers in bold are competing in the Formula One championship in 2026.
A pink background indicates an event which was not part of any championship.
A yellow background indicates an event which was part of the pre-war European Grand Prix Championship.
A green background indicates an event which was part of the pre-war World Manufacturers' Championship.

Wins	Manufacturer	Years won
22	(Italy) **Ferrari**	1949, 1951, 1952, 1960, 1961, 1964, 1966, 1970, 1975, 1979, 1988, 1996, 1998, 2000, 2002, 2003, 2004, 2006, 2008, 2010, 2019, 2024
16	(Germany) **Mercedes** *	1934, 1937, 1954, 1955, 1997, 2005, 2007, 2009, 2012, 2014, 2015, 2016, 2017, 2018, 2021, 2026
9	(Italy) Alfa Romeo	1924, 1925, 1931, 1932, 1933, 1947, 1948, 1950, 1978
8	(United States) Ford **	1968, 1969, 1972, 1973, 1974, 1976, 1977, 1980
8	(France) Renault	1981, 1982, 1991, 1993, 1994, 1995, 2011, 2013
7	(Japan) **Honda**	1967, 1986, 1987, 1989, 1990, 1992, 2020
3	(Germany) Auto Union	1935, 1936, 1938
3	(United Kingdom) BRM	1962, 1965, 1971
2	(Italy) Fiat	1922, 1923
2	(France) Bugatti	1926, 1928
2	(Italy) Maserati	1953, 1956
2	(United Kingdom) Vanwall	1957, 1958
2	(United Kingdom) Climax	1959, 1963
2	(Luxembourg) TAG ***	1984, 1985
2	(Germany) BMW	1983, 2001
2	(Japan) Honda RBPT	2023, 2025

* Between 1997 and 2005 built by Ilmor, funded by Mercedes

** Built by Cosworth, funded by Ford

*** Built by Porsche
