= 1921 French Grand Prix =

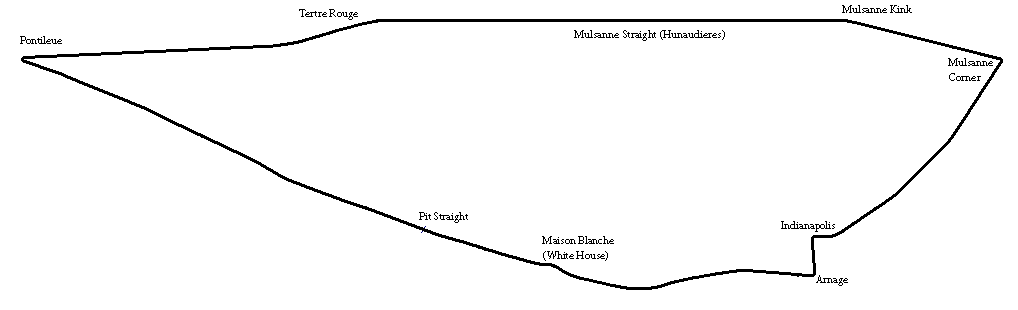

Race details
- Date: 25 July 1921
- Official name: XV Grand Prix de l'Automobile Club de France
- Location: Le Mans, France
- Course: Circuit de la Sarthe
- Course length: 17.26 km (10.72 miles)
- Distance: 30 laps, 517.80 km (321.75 miles)

Fastest lap
Driver	(United States) Jimmy Murphy	Duesenberg
- Time: 7:43.0

Podium
First	(United States) Jimmy Murphy	Duesenberg
Second	(United States) Ralph DePalma	Ballot
Third	(France) Jules Goux	Ballot

The 1921 French Grand Prix (formally the XV Grand Prix de l'Automobile Club de France) was a Grand Prix motor race held at Le Mans on 25 July 1921. The race was held over 30 laps of the 17.26 km circuit for a total distance of 517.8 km and was won by Jimmy Murphy driving a Duesenberg. This was the last victory for an American constructor in a major European race until the Ford GT40's triumph at the 1966 24 Hours of Le Mans as well as in a Grand Prix race until the Dan Gurney's win with the Eagle car at the 1967 Belgian Grand Prix. The race did not feature a massed start, with cars released in pairs at one-minute intervals instead.

== Report ==
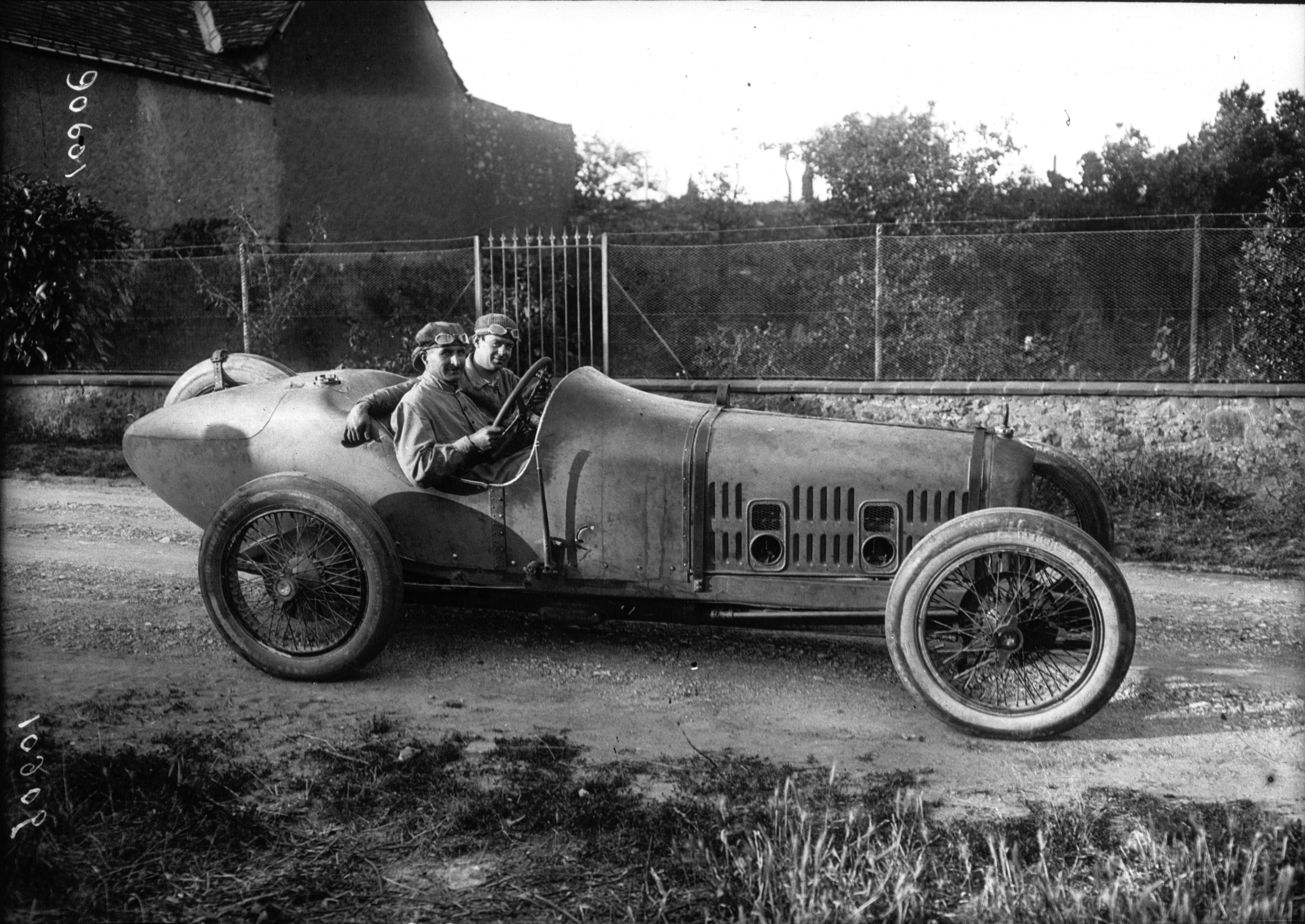
Jean Chassagne

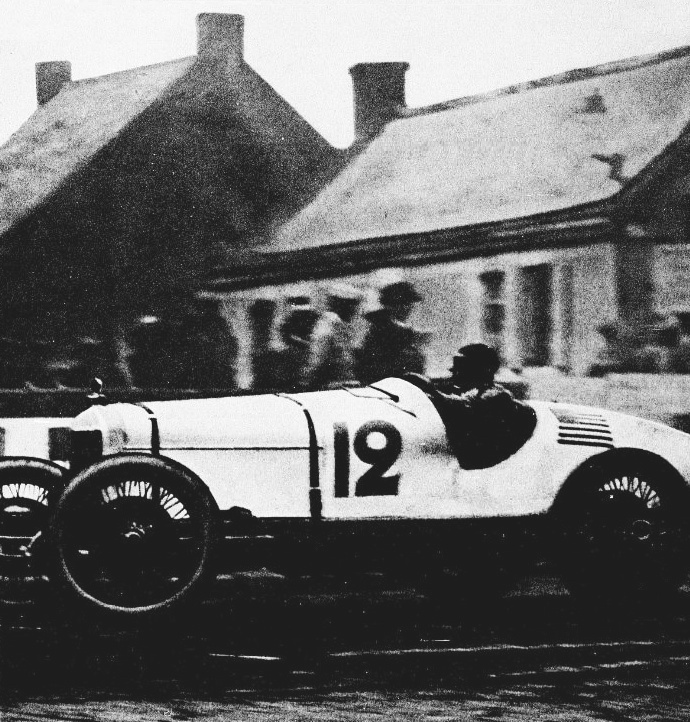
Jimmy Murphy in his Duesenberg

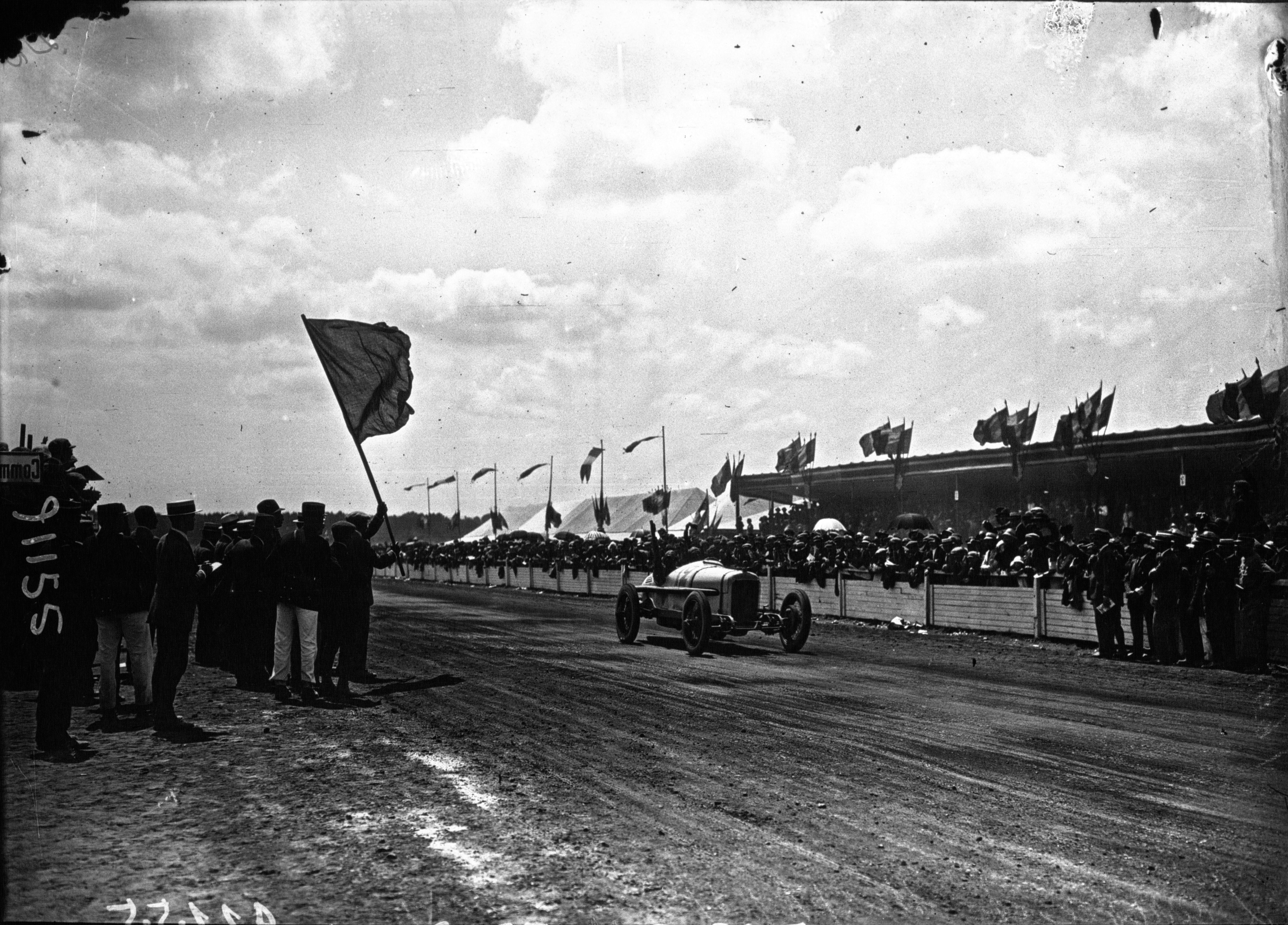
Jimmy Murphy crossing the finish line to win the race

Although this was the first French Grand Prix since the end of the first World War, the initial entry featured entries from four countries (entries from Germany were not allowed). The US was represented by eventual winner Duesenberg, and France by Ballot and Mathis, the latter of which was based in Strasbourg, which was part of Germany before World War I. The three Italian Fiats entered did not materialise due to labour issues. The newly formed British-French Sunbeam-Talbot-Darracq (S.T.D.) originally entered 7 nearly identical cars as 3 makes, Sunbeam, Talbot and Talbot-Darracq, however due to a lack of preparation, the two Sunbeams were withdrawn, while André Dubonnet - originally entered in a Talbot-Darracq - replaced the injured Inghilbert in the fourth Duesenberg and was not himself replaced by Talbot-Darracq for the race.

As the first major Grand Prix since the War, it was decided that engine regulations should match those of the Indianapolis 500 with a 3-litre maximum.

The race started at 9 am (on a Monday due to a motorcycle race the previous day) under threatening clouds, with the first pair away being Émile Mathis and Ralph DePalma (in a Ballot), with DePalma making a considerably better start. The other cars followed in pairs at one-minute intervals (the original starting intervals of 30 seconds having been changed at the last minute), with Andre Dubonnet last to start on his own in a Duesenberg. Fastest on the first lap were both DePalma and Joe Boyer in a Duesenberg, equal with 8 minutes 16, with the third-place also a tie, between Murphy in a Duesenberg and Jean Chassagne in a Ballot.

By the end of the second lap, the order was more established, with Murphy leading Boyer, Chassagne, and DePalma.

The battle was close between the Duesenbergs, with their superior brakes, and the Ballots, with their superior cornering, whilst the S.T.D.s struggled with tire and road-holding problems (Lee Guinness stopping a remarkably 15 times in the 30 lap race), with Andre Boillot the only S.T.D. to drive consistently, holding sixth place in the early laps.

The order changed little near the front, with Murphy pulling nearly a two-minute lead by lap 7. Chassagne overtook Boyer for second on the ninth lap. Murphy made a pitstop at the end of lap 10 but didn't lose the lead, however, Chassagne was now close behind and was able to take the lead during lap 11. By half distance, Chassagne leads Boyer who had also overtaken Murphy, now third. Guyot was not far behind in fourth, then a much larger gap to the lower positions, lead by DePalma.

On lap 17, Chassagne made a pitstop to refuel but his fuel tank had burst and was beyond repair. On the very next lap, Boyer who had just inherited the lead suffered a mechanical failure, giving the lead back to Murphy ahead of a slowing Guyot. Murphy would hold onto this lead until the end, but behind him, the fight for second place was more dramatic. Guyot had a large gap back to third place, but when he stopped for fuel and water on lap 28, he was unable to restart. His mechanic became very tired trying to push-start the car and was replaced by Arthur Duray who was at the race as a spectator. They were able to restart but this had damaged the clutch forcing another stop and they ended up in sixth place. DePalma then took second, but he too had considerable difficulty restarting but was still able to finish ahead of third-placed Jules Goux in a 2-litre Ballot who finished the race without stopping.

== Classification ==
Pos	No	Driver	Car	Laps	Time/Retired
1	12	(United States) Jimmy Murphy	Duesenberg	30	4:07:11.4
2	1	(United States) Ralph DePalma	Ballot 3L	30	+14:59.2
3	18	(France) Jules Goux	Ballot 2LS	30	+21:26.8
4	19	(France) André Dubonnet	Duesenberg	30	+23:07.8
5	5	(France) Andre Boillot	Talbot-Darracq (S.T.D.)	30	+28:36.0
6	6	(France) Albert Guyot	Duesenberg	30	+36:01.6
7	14	(France) Louis Wagner	Ballot 3L	30	+40:50.4
8	4	(United Kingdom) Kenelm Lee Guinness	Talbot (S.T.D.)	30	+59:32.4
9	10	(United Kingdom) Henry Segrave	Talbot (S.T.D.)	30	+1:00:54.6
Ret	11	(France) René Thomas	Talbot-Darracq (S.T.D.)	23	Oil tank
Ret	16	(United States) Joe Boyer	Duesenberg	17	Engine
Ret	8	(France) Jean Chassagne	Ballot 3L	17	Fuel tank
Ret	3	(France) Émile Mathis	Mathis	5	Engine
DNS	15	(France) André Dubonnet	Talbot-Darracq (S.T.D.)		Originally entered in Talbot-Darracq team. Replaced injured Inghilbert in Duesenberg for race
DNS	2	(United Kingdom) Louis Zborowski	Sunbeam (S.T.D.)		Car not ready
DNA	9	(United Kingdom) Dario Resta	Sunbeam (S.T.D.)		Car not ready
DNA	7	(Italy) Ugo Sivocci	Fiat 802		Car not ready due to labour difficulties
DNA	13	(Italy) Pietro Bordino	Fiat 802		Car not ready due to labour difficulties
DNA	17	Unknown	Fiat 802		Third Fiat entry; car not ready due to labour difficulties
DNA	19	(France) Louis Inghibert	Duesenberg		Injured in practice; replaced by Dubonnet for race

Grand Prix Race
Previous race: 1914 French Grand Prix	1921 Grand Prix season Grandes Épreuves	Next race: 1921 Italian Grand Prix
Previous race: 1914 French Grand Prix	French Grand Prix	Next race: 1922 French Grand Prix
