= 1921 Italian Grand Prix =

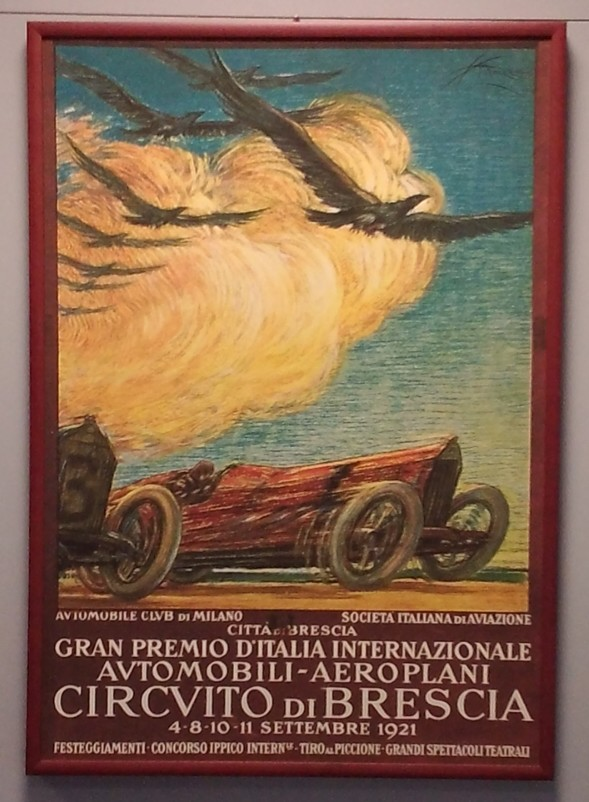

Race details
- Date: 4 September 1921
- Official name: I Gran Premio d'Italia
- Location: Montichiari, Italy
- Course: Montichiari
- Course length: 17.30 km (10.75 miles)
- Distance: 30 laps, 519 km (322.5 miles)

Pole position
Driver	(France) Louis Wagner	Fiat
- Grid positions set by car number

Fastest lap
Driver	(Italy) Pietro Bordino	Fiat
- Time: 6:54.2

Podium
First	(France) Jules Goux	Ballot
Second	(France) Jean Chassagne	Ballot
Third	(France) Louis Wagner	Fiat

The 1921 Italian Grand Prix was a Grand Prix motor race held on the Circuito della Fascia d'Oro at Montichiari, near Brescia, on 4 September 1921. It was the inaugural edition of the Italian Grand Prix.

The race was won by Jules Goux driving a Ballot 3/8 LC. The victory also secured the fifth edition of the Coppa Florio for the French manufacturer.

== Background and entry criteria ==
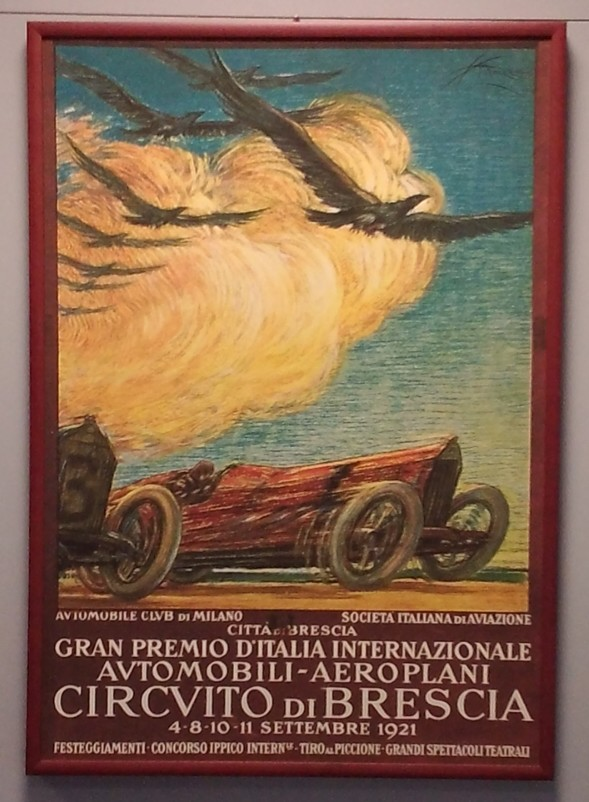
Poster of the 1921 Italian Grand Prix for automobiles and aeroplanes

The Automobile Club of Milan, which had managed the 1907, 1908, and 1914 editions of the Coppa Florio, intended to restore the race and establish a Grand Prix, in the style of the French experience, on a circuit to be held in Brescia. At the meeting of the AIACR (International Association of Recognized Automobile Clubs) in December 1920, a calendar of international races to be held the following year was prepared, and the Italian event was scheduled for Sunday, 4 September.

The AIACR also determined the specifications for racing in Grands Prix: a single formula, which would last at least one year, was a guarantee for manufacturers who could design racing cars at low costs and reduced times. The 1921 editions of the Italian Grand Prix and the French one were reserved for cars with an engine capacity of 3000 cm^{3} and a minimum weight of 500 kg, specifications similar to those of the Indianapolis 500 established by the American Automobile Association for that year.

The Brescia organizing committee and the AC of Milan chose to hold the Grand Prix on a 17.3 km (10.75 mi) circuit near the town of Montichiari. The event was accompanied by other minor automobile races, reserved for voiturettes and gentlemen drivers, as well as aviation races.

== Entries and practice ==
Four automobile manufacturers were entered in the 1921 edition of the Grand Prix: the French Ballot and the Italian Fiat and Itala, with three cars each, while the Italian SCAT entered only two cars. On 25 August, the starting order was drawn: Itala was assigned race numbers 1, 5, and 9; Fiat was assigned 2, 6, and 10; SCAT got 3 and 7; Ballot obtained 4, 8, and 11. The American Duesenberg, which had won the French Grand Prix, could not participate: its cars were impounded at the request of Bugatti, because they used without permission a brake patented by the French company.

Practice was held on the mornings of the odd days from 25 to 31 August and on 1 September. Itala did not present any car, while SCAT, on 31 August, brought a car to Montichiari entrusted to Augusto Tarabusi.

== Race report ==
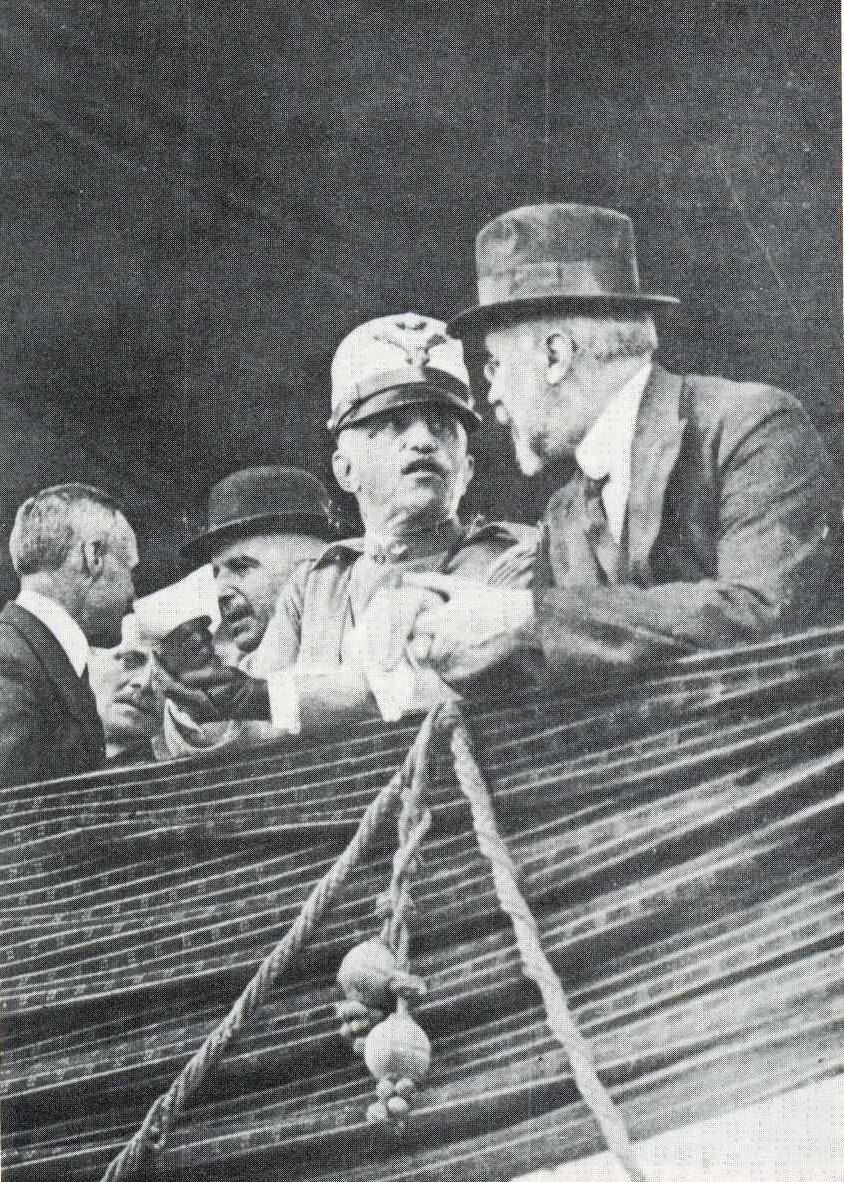
King Victor Emmanuel III and Prime Minister Ivanoe Bonomi at the Montichiari circuit grandstands

Fiat assigned number 2 to the Frenchman Louis Wagner and mechanic Evasio Lampiano, 6 to Pietro Bordino (mechanic: Ambrogio Bruno) and 10 to Ugo Sivocci (mechanic: Antonio Morgante). Ballot entrusted car 4 to the Italian-American Ralph DePalma, already a winner at Indianapolis in 1915, flanked by mechanic Paul De Pierre. Car 8 was assigned by the French company to Jean Chassagne (mechanic: Robert Lally) and 11 to Jules Goux (mechanic: Rafael Leboucq), winner at Indianapolis in 1913. SCAT's car 3 driven by Augusto Tarabusi, with his brother Amedeo as mechanic, did not complete any practice lap and did not line up at the finish line.

The start of the race was attended by King Victor Emmanuel III and the Prime Minister Ivanoe Bonomi. The King left the grandstands around half past eleven to go to Brescia as a lunch guest of Senator Federico Bettoni. Bonomi left the grandstands at ten o'clock to go to Volta Mantovana.

The cars started according to number order and at a distance of one minute each. Wagner was therefore the first to start, at exactly eight o'clock, while Goux was the last, at five past eight. When all the competitors passed the finish line for the first time, the fastest time was obtained by Bordino, with 7:20.3, while the slowest was Sivocci, with 12:39: he misjudged the trajectory of the Ghedi junction corner, hitting the sandbags. On the third lap, Wagner stopped to replace a wheel, while Bordino remained firmly in the lead until reaching an average speed of 150.07 km/h on the seventh lap, completing it in 6:55.1.

On the ninth lap it started to rain, so the mechanics prepared to replace the tires with studded ones as a precaution, but the weather improved shortly after. On the twelfth lap, Bordino set another track record with 6:54.1 at an average speed of 150.37 km/h, which remained unbeaten until the end of the race. On the thirteenth lap, the Piedmontese had a two-minute advantage over Goux and Chassagne, six over Wagner, seven over DePalma and an eight-minute advantage over Sivocci. Both at the end of that lap and the following one, Bordino had to stop to replace a tire and refuel. Goux took the lead, distancing his direct opponent by sixteen seconds. The Piedmontese covered the fifteenth lap with a time exceeding eight minutes, allowing Chassagne to catch him. On the sixteenth lap, the oil tank of Bordino's Fiat broke, forcing him to reach the finish line at a walking pace, thus retiring from the race.

On the eighteenth lap, Goux extended his lead over Chassagne's Ballot to almost two minutes. Sivocci, still last, arrived at the finish line to replace the water pipe and then retired due to an engine failure. Two laps later, Goux, who had started two minutes behind Chassagne, overtook his teammate in front of the royal grandstand. On the twenty-first lap, Wagner stopped to replace another wheel: the third since the beginning of the race. On the following lap, DePalma, by then last, retired due to an unspecified failure. The standings remained stable until the end: Goux firmly in the lead, followed by his teammate Chassagne, while Wagner remained third. On the twenty-sixth lap, the Frenchman in the Fiat stopped for the fourth time to replace a wheel.

Jules Goux won the first Italian Grand Prix at an average speed of 144.736 km/h covering the 519 km in 3h 35m 09s. The fifth edition of the Coppa Florio was assigned to Ballot, while Pietro Bordino won the Coppa del Re (King's Cup) as the author of the fastest lap.

== Classification ==
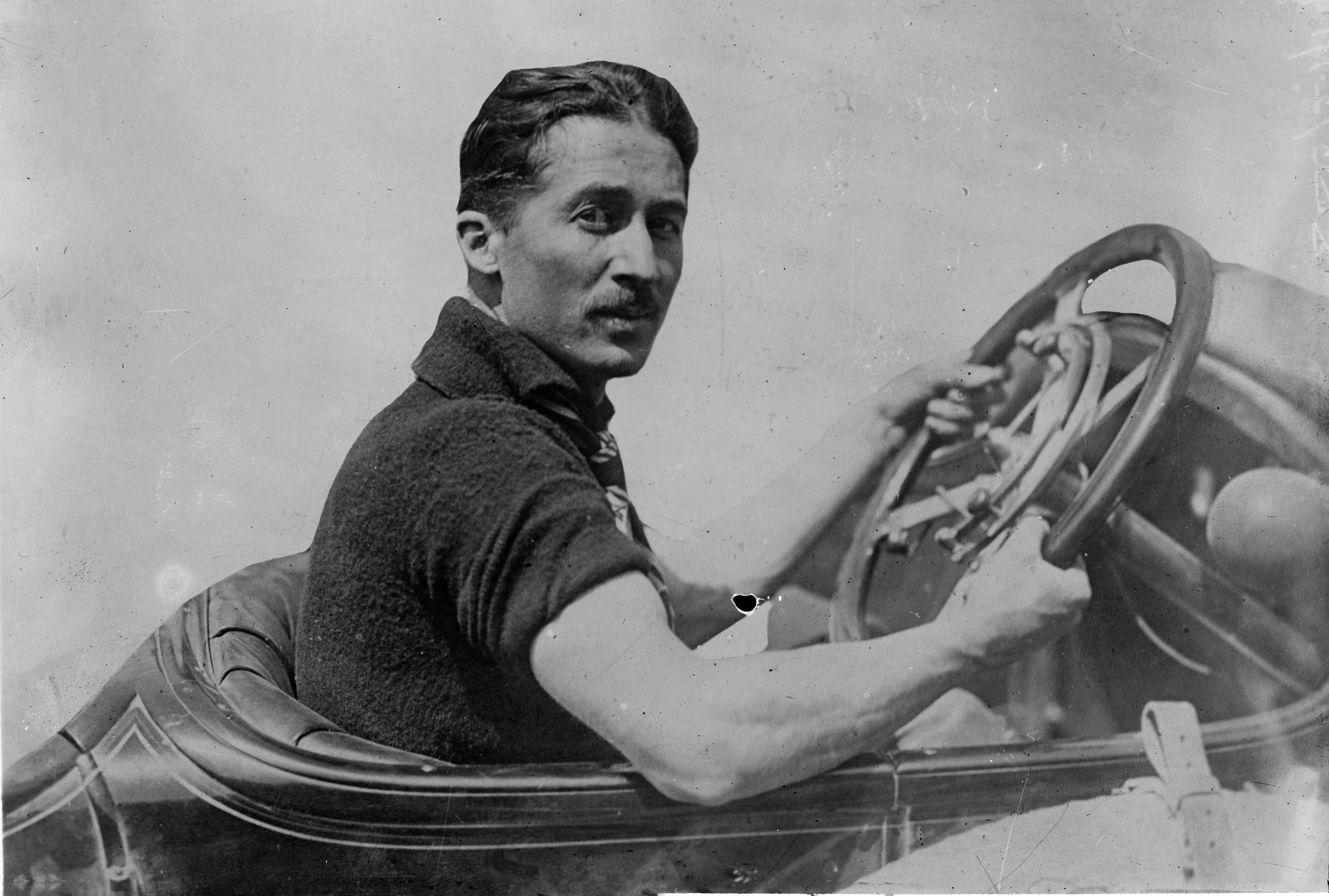
The winner Jules Goux

Pos	No	Driver	Car	Laps	Time/Retired
1	11	(France) Jules Goux	Ballot 3/8 LC	30	3h 35m 09s
2	8	(France) Jean Chassagne	Ballot 3/8 LC	30	3h 40m 52s
3	2	(France) Louis Wagner	Fiat 802	30	3h 45m 33s
Ret	4	(United States) Ralph DePalma	Ballot 3/8 LC	21	Mechanical
Ret	10	(Italy) Ugo Sivocci	Fiat 802	18	Engine
Ret	6	(Italy) Pietro Bordino	Fiat 802	16	Oil tank

== Bibliography ==
- Miceli, Albino (1982). Storia del circuito automobilistico di Brescia-Montichiari. Brescia: Zanetti.

Grand Prix Race
Previous race: 1921 French Grand Prix	1921 Grand Prix season Grandes Épreuves	Next race: 1922 French Grand Prix
Previous race: None	Italian Grand Prix	Next race: 1922 Italian Grand Prix
