= Ansaldo (car) =

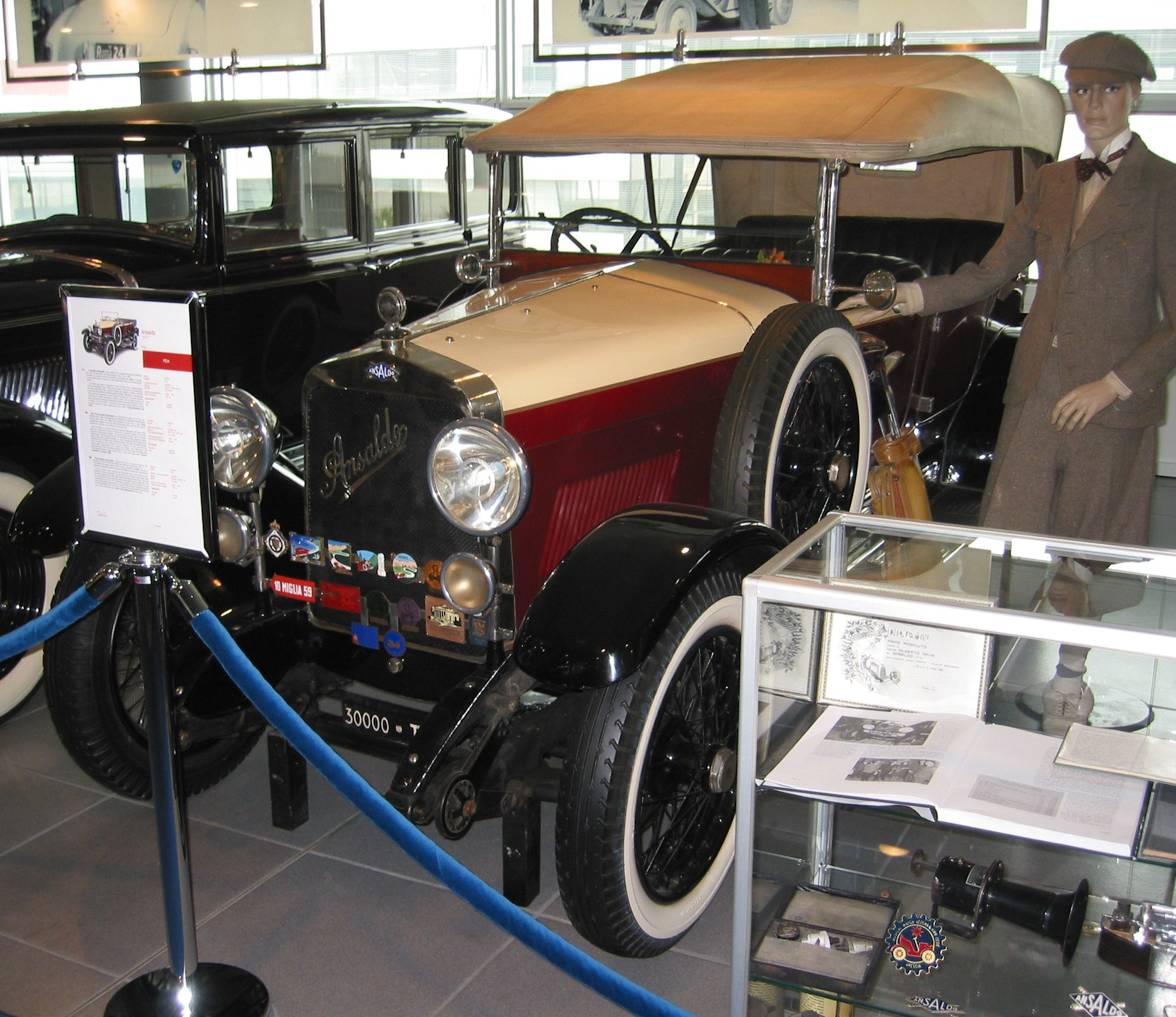
1924 Ansaldo

The Ansaldo was an Italian automobile manufactured by the armaments concern Gio. Ansaldo & C. from 1921 to 1931 based in Torino. The company entered car manufacture with an OHC 1,847 cc (112.7 cu in) inline-four engine model which could develop 36 bhp (27 kW) at 3600 rpm. A sports version with 1,981 cc (120.9 cu in) engine was offered, as was a six-cylinder version of 1991 cc; later six-cylinders were offered with engines of 2179 cc.

Among the company's last cars was an OHV straight-8 of 3,532 cc (215.5 cu in). Ansaldos were generally of good quality and modern design, and competed in many races. When Wikov began manufacture in Czechoslovakia in 1928, they built the 1,453 cc (88.7 cu in) Ansaldo Tipo 10.

In 1928 the company manufactured their first commercial chassis for omnibus and ambulance with front engine rear axle configuration powered by a two liter petrol inline four engine producing 35hp of power. Supporting was a four speed manual transmission which helped the vehicle achieve 38mph and with a 63 liter fuel tank capacity. Next year the manufacturer also started to manufacture commercial taxi cars which were not much different than their standard parts.
