= 1921 AAA Championship Car season =

Auto racing season

- AAA National Championship Trail

Season
- Races: 20
- Start date: February 27
- End date: December 11

Awards
- National champion: (United States) Tommy Milton
- Indianapolis 500 winner: (United States) Tommy Milton

The 1921 AAA Championship Car season consisted of 20 races, beginning in Beverly Hills, California on February 27 and concluding in San Carlos, California on December 11. There was also one non-championship race. The AAA National Champion and Indianapolis 500 winner was Tommy Milton.

Alton Soules, and his riding mechanic Harry Barner, perished at the Fresno Speedway during the second race.

== Schedule and results ==
All races running on Dirt/Brick/Board Oval.

Rnd	Date	Race name	Track	Location-	Type	Pole position	Winning driver
1	February 27	(United States) Beverly Hills Heat 1 - 25	Los Angeles Motor Speedway	Beverly Hills, California	Board	—	(United States) Ralph DePalma
2	February 27	(United States) Beverly Hills Heat 2 - 25	Los Angeles Motor Speedway	Beverly Hills, California	Board	—	(United States) Roscoe Sarles
3	February 27	(United States) Beverly Hills Heat 3 - 25	Los Angeles Motor Speedway	Beverly Hills, California	Board	—	(United States) Jimmy Murphy
4	February 27	(United States) Beverly Hills Heat 4 - 25	Los Angeles Motor Speedway	Beverly Hills, California	Board	—	(United States) Tommy Milton
5	February 27	(United States) Beverly Hills Main - 50	Los Angeles Motor Speedway	Beverly Hills, California	Board	—	(United States) Ralph DePalma
6	April 10	(United States) Beverly Hills Heat 1 - 25	Los Angeles Motor Speedway	Beverly Hills, California	Board	(United States) Tommy Milton	(United States) Ralph DePalma
7	April 10	(United States) Beverly Hills Heat 2 - 25	Los Angeles Motor Speedway	Beverly Hills, California	Board	—	(United States) Eddie Pullen
8	April 10	(United States) Beverly Hills Heat 3 - 25	Los Angeles Motor Speedway	Beverly Hills, California	Board	—	(United States) Joe Thomas
9	April 10	(United States) Beverly Hills Heat 4 - 25	Los Angeles Motor Speedway	Beverly Hills, California	Board	—	(United States) Jimmy Murphy
10	April 10	(United States) Beverly Hills Main - 50	Los Angeles Motor Speedway	Beverly Hills, California	Board	—	(United States) Jimmy Murphy
11	April 30	(United States) Raisin Day Classic - 150	Fresno Speedway	Fresno, California	Board	(United States) Roscoe Sarles	(United States) Joe Thomas
12	May 30	(United States) International 500 Mile Sweepstakes	Indianapolis Motor Speedway	Speedway, Indiana	Brick	(United States) Ralph DePalma	(United States) Tommy Milton
13	June 18	(United States) Universal Trophy - 225	Uniontown Speedway	Hopwood, Pennsylvania	Board	—	(United States) Roscoe Sarles
14	July 4	(United States) Tacoma Montamarathon - 250	Tacoma Speedway	Tacoma, Washington	Board	(United States) Tommy Milton	(United States) Tommy Milton
15	August 14	(United States) Cotati Race 1 - 150	Cotati Speedway	Santa Rosa, California	Board	—	(United States) Eddie Hearne
16	September 5	(United States) 5th Annual Autumn Classic - 225	Uniontown Speedway	Hopwood, Pennsylvania	Board	—	(United States) I. P. Fetterman
NC	September 19	(United States) Syracuse Race - 50	New York State Fairgrounds	Syracuse, New York	Dirt	—	(United States) Ira Vail
17	October 1	(United States) San Joaquin Valley Classic - 150	Fresno Speedway	Fresno, California	Board	—	(United States) Earl Cooper
18	October 23	(United States) Cotati Race 2 - 150	Cotati Speedway	Santa Rosa, California	Board	—	(United States) Roscoe Sarles
19	November 24	(United States) Beverly Hills Race 11 - 250	Los Angeles Motor Speedway	Beverly Hills, California	Board	(United States) Roscoe Sarles	(United States) Eddie Hearne
20	December 11	(United States) San Carlos Race - 250	San Francisco Speedway	San Carlos, California	Board	—	(United States) Jimmy Murphy

Non-championship race

== Final points standings ==
Note: Drivers had to be running at the finish to score points. Points scored by drivers sharing a ride were split according to percentage of race driven. Starters were not allowed to score points as relief drivers, if a race starter finished the race in another car, in a points scoring position, those points were awarded to the driver who had started the car.
The final standings based on reference.

Pos	Driver	BEV1 (United States)	BEV2 (United States)	BEV3 (United States)	BEV4 (United States)	BEV5 (United States)	BEV6 (United States)	BEV7 (United States)	BEV8 (United States)	BEV9 (United States)	BEV10 (United States)	FRE1 (United States)	INDY (United States)	UNI1 (United States)	TAC (United States)	COT1 (United States)	UNI2 (United States)	FRE2 (United States)	COT2 (United States)	BEV11 (United States)	SCA (United States)	Pts
1	(United States) Tommy Milton	5	2	2*	1*	2	**4**	4	3	4		6	1	8	**1**	3	10	8	10	2*	2	2230
2	(United States) Roscoe Sarles	2*	1			3*	2	2*	5	2	2	**2**	2	1	2	2	3	5	1	**10**	6	1980
3	(United States) Eddie Hearne	3	5	DNS	5	DNS	6	3	2	3	4	3	13	2	5	1	5	4	3*	1	3	1399
4	(United States) Jimmy Murphy	8	3	1		4	8	7	DNS	1*	1*	5	14	6	9		2	2	5	4	1*	1215
5	(United States) Joe Thomas						3	6	1*		5	1*	22	9	3	6	6	DNQ	2	8	7	715
6	(United States) I. P. Fetterman																1					400
7	(United States) Eddie Miller	7	6	4	2	6						10	4	3	4	4	4	6	7	6	10	395
8	(United States) Ralph DePalma	1	9			1	1*				6	8	**12***						4	7	5	355
9	(United States) Earl Cooper																	1				300
10	(United States) Frank Elliott													7	8	9	9	3	6	3	12	265
11	(United States) Eddie Pullen						5	1			3	4	14	DNP	7						11	140
12	(United States) Harry Hartz RY																			5	4	130
13	(United States) Percy Ford												3									127
14	(United States) Tom Alley												11	4	6	7		DNP	9			90
15	(United States) Ora Haibe												5									90
16	(United States) Bennett Hill											7	8				11		DNQ	DNP	9	57
17	(United States) Ira Vail	4	4	3	3	5							7	DNP		DNP						50
18	(United States) Alton Soules R	6	7	5	4	DNS	7	5	4	5		9		5	10*	5	DNP	9				50
19	(United States) Jerry Wunderlich												8	11		8		7	8	11		43
20	(United States) Ralph Mulford												9	DNP								35
21	(France) Albert Guyot												6									30
22	(United States) Andy Burt												3									15
23	(United States) Howdy Wilcox												23				7		DNQ			15
24	(United States) Don Fretwell R																			DNP	8	15
25	(United States) Jules Ellingboe R												19	10			8		DNQ			10
26	(United States) Art Klein																			9		10
-	(United States) John Thiele	9	8	DNS	DNS								DNS			DNS		DNP				0
-	(France) René Thomas												10									0
-	(United States) Al Melcher																			12		0
-	(United States) Charles Basle																			13		0
-	(United States) Riley Brett												15									0
-	(United States) Harry Thicksten												15									0
-	(United States) Cornelius Van Ranst R												16									0
-	(United States) Joe Boyer												17									0
-	(France) Jean Chassagne												18									0
-	(France) André Boillot												20									0
-	(United States) Louis Fountaine												21									0
-	(United States) Mervin Headley												DNQ									0
-	(United States) Eddie Meyer																	DNQ				0
-	(United States) L. L. Corum												DNS									0
-	(United States) Jim Crosby															DNS						0
-	(United States) Mike Moosie															DNS						0
-	(United States) Ralph Snoddy																			DNS		0
-	(United Kingdom) Dario Resta												DNP									0
Pos	Driver	BEV1 (United States)	BEV2 (United States)	BEV3 (United States)	BEV4 (United States)	BEV5 (United States)	BEV6 (United States)	BEV7 (United States)	BEV8 (United States)	BEV9 (United States)	BEV10 (United States)	FRE1 (United States)	INDY (United States)	UNI1 (United States)	TAC (United States)	COT1 (United States)	UNI2 (United States)	FRE2 (United States)	COT2 (United States)	BEV11 (United States)	SCA (United States)	Pts

Color	Result
Gold	Winner
Silver	2nd place
Bronze	3rd place
Green	4th & 5th place
Light Blue	6th-10th place
Dark Blue	Finished (Outside Top 10)
Purple	Did not finish (Ret)
Red	Did not qualify (DNQ)
Brown	Withdrawn (Wth)
Black	Disqualified (DSQ)
White	Did not start (DNS)
Blank	Did not participate (DNP)
Blank	Not competing

**In-line notation**
**Bold**	Pole position
Italics	Ran fastest race lap
*	Led most race laps
Rookie of the Year
Rookie

== See also ==
- 1921 Indianapolis 500
