= Eddie Pullen =

American racing driver (1883–1940)

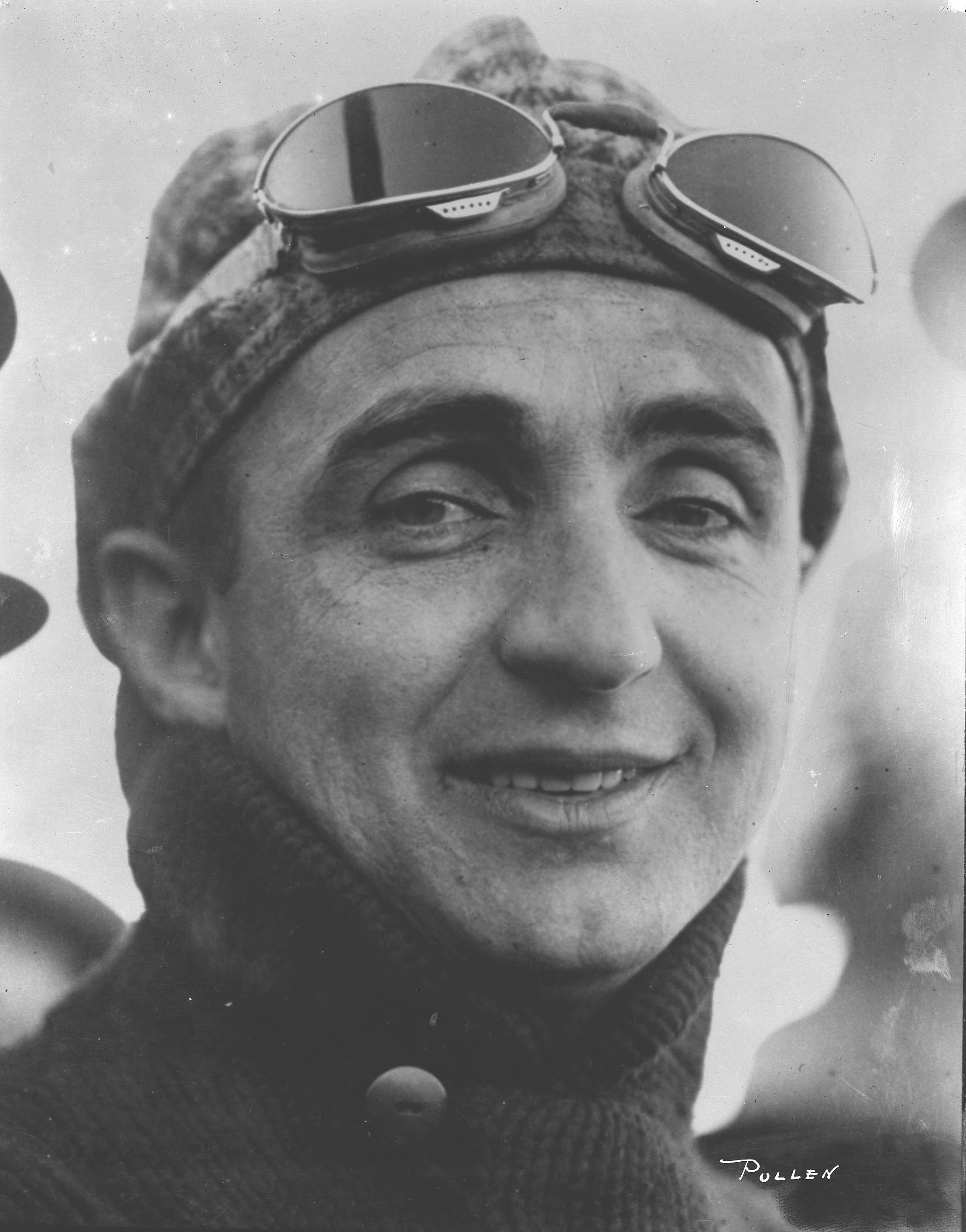
- Pullen at Tacoma Speedway in 1921
- Born: Edward Frank Pullen; August 16, 1883 Trenton, New Jersey, U.S.
- Died: October 6, 1940 (aged 57) Los Angeles, California, U.S.

Champ Car career
- 34 races run over 9 years
- Best finish: 11th (1921)
- First race: 1912 Montamara Fiesta Race (Tacoma)
- Last race: 1921 San Carlos 250 (San Carlos)
- First win: 1912 Montamara Fiesta Race (Tacoma)
- Last win: 1921 25-mile Heat #2 (Beverly Hills)
Wins	Podiums	Poles
5	13	1

Edward Frank Pullen (August 16, 1883 — October 6, 1940) was an American racing driver who worked for and primarily raced the Mercer marque.

== Biography ==
Pullen was born on August 16, 1883, in Trenton, New Jersey.

Pullen began his racing career in 1912 and won his first Championship Car race on the road course at the Tacoma Speedway in Tacoma, Washington. He won the 1914 American Grand Prize at Santa Monica, but failed to qualify for the Indianapolis 500 as the Mercer he drove was better suited to road course racing than the open expanses of the Indianapolis Motor Speedway. Pullen raced for West Coast Mercer dealer George R. Bentel in 1915 along with Barney Oldfield and Eddie Rickenbacker.

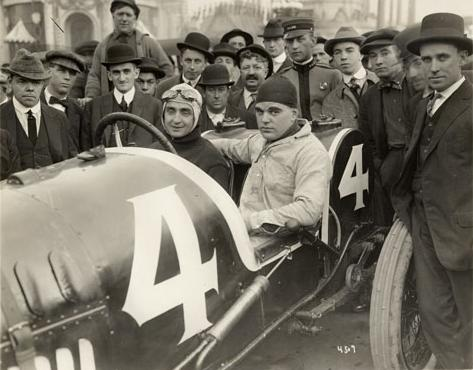
Pullen at the wheel of his Mercer before the 1915 American Grand Prize

Pullen continued driving a Mercer even after the manufacturer had ceased supporting its racing program. He switched to a Hudson in 1919 but struggled. In 1921 for his final season of racing, he switched to a Duesenberg and won a 20 lap race on the Beverly Hills board oval. Later that year, he surrendered his 1921 Indianapolis 500 entry to Joe Thomas but drove in relief for Jimmy Murphy on raceday but crashed on lap 107.

In July 1932, Pullen worked on a Ford Motor Company promotion demonstrating the endurance of the newly developed V-8 engine, with a 33,301-mile (53,593 km) demonstration, in the Mojave desert, near Rosamond, California.

Pullen died in Los Angeles, California on October 6, 1940.
