= Joe Thomas (racing driver) =

American racing driver (1890–1965)

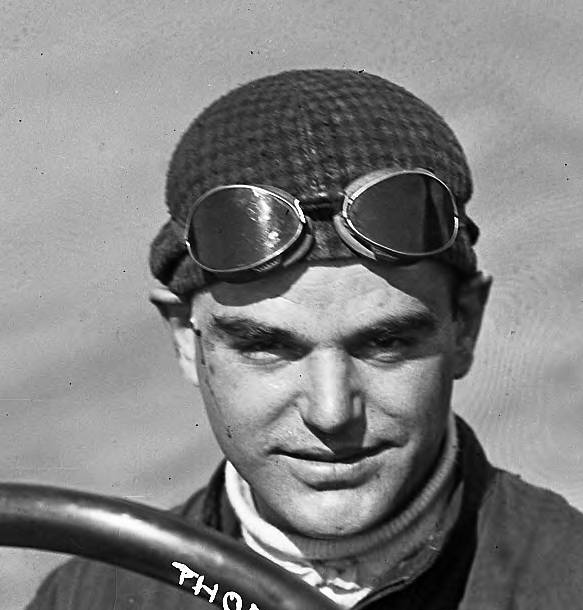
- Thomas at Tacoma Speedway in 1914
- Born: Joseph Henry Thomas; August 2, 1890 Grays Harbor, Washington, U.S.
- Died: December 28, 1965 (aged 75) Sacramento, California, U.S.

Champ Car career
- 50 races run over 10 years
- Best finish: 5th (1921)
- First race: 1916 Vanderbilt Cup (Santa Monica)
- Last race: 1923 Raisin Day Classic (Fresno)
- First win: 1921 25-mile Heat #3 (Beverly Hills)
- Last win: 1921 Raisin Day Classic (Fresno)
Wins	Podiums	Poles
2	9	1

Joseph Henry Thomas (August 2, 1890 – December 28, 1965) was an American racing driver. Thomas started his professional racing career as a mechanician for Eddie Pullen in 1913.

== Motorsports career results ==
=== Indianapolis 500 results ===
Year	Car	Start	Qual	Rank	Finish	Laps	Led	Retired
1920	28	19	92.800	6	8	200	0	Running
1921	25	22	96.250	5	22	25	0	Crash T3
1922	10	17	88.800	21	10	200	0	Running
Totals						425	0	

Starts	3
Poles	0
Front Row	0
Wins	0
Top 5	0
Top 10	2
Retired	1
