= C. W. Van Ranst =

American racing driver (1892–1972)

- Born: Cornelius Willett Van Ranst; December 7, 1892 New York, New York, U.S.
- Died: October 11, 1972 (aged 79) Detroit, Michigan, U.S.

Champ Car career
- 1 race run over 2 years
- First race: 1921 Indianapolis 500 (Indianapolis)
Wins	Podiums	Poles
0	0	0

Cornelius Willett Van Ranst (December 7, 1892 – October 11, 1972) was an American racing driver who competed in the 1921 Indianapolis 500.

== Biography ==
Van Ranst was born on December 7, 1892, in New York City, New York.

An engineer by trade, Van Ranst developed the overhead valve cylinder heads for the Ford-Frontenac engine fielded by Louis Chevrolet in 1921. In 1927 he and Tommy Milton built a front-wheel drive race car for the Indy 500 dubbed the Detroit Special. He also worked as an engineer for Duesenberg and Cord Automobile and was instrumental in the development of the Cord L-29, one of the first front wheel drive road cars.

In 1930 Van Ranst, once again with Milton's collaboration, designed an all-new V12 engine for Packard. The initial engine was of 6,157 cc capacity with the unusual vee angle of 67° and was intended for use in a front-wheel drive chassis. The onset of the Depression meant that it was never offered for sale and in 1931 Packard paid Milton and Van Ranst $10,000 for the rights to it. It was finally exhibited in January 1932, although as a rear-wheel drive chassis. This engine and chassis appeared slow, under-powered and lacking in torque. Packard engineer Charlie Vincent enlarged both bore and stroke to a new capacity of 7,300 cc, also relocating the spark plugs nearer the center of its unusual "inverted hemi-head" combustion chamber, amidst a host of detail changes. Production of this new "Packard Twin Six" continued successfully until the outbreak of World War Two.

Van Ranst died on October 11, 1972, in Detroit, Michigan.

== Motorsports career results ==
=== Indianapolis 500 results ===
Year	Car	Start	Qual	Rank	Finish	Laps	Led	Retired
1921	28	23	88.350	14	16	87	0	Water hose
Totals						87	0	

Starts	1
Poles	0
Front Row	0
Wins	0
Top 5	0
Top 10	0
Retired	1
