= Jean Chassagne =

French racing driver (1881–1947)

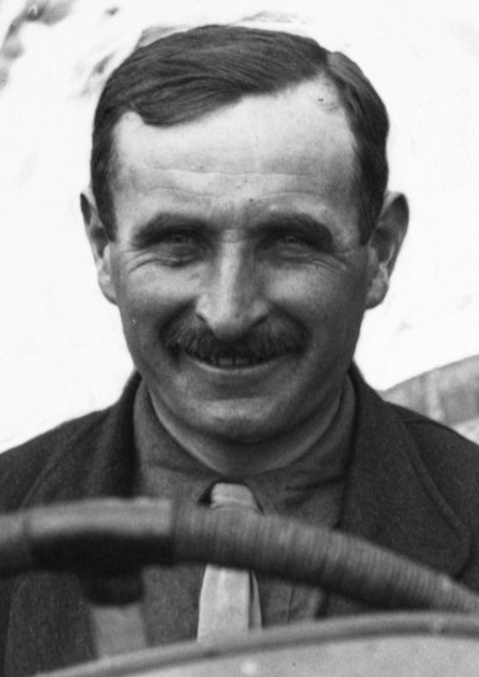
- Chassagne in 1914
- Born: Julien Jean Chassagne; 26 July 1881 La Croisille-sur-Briance, Haute-Vienne, France
- Died: 13 April 1947 (aged 65) La Croisille-sur-Briance, Haute-Vienne, France

Champ Car career
- 3 races run over 3 years
- Best finish: 15th (1920)
- First race: 1914 Indianapolis 500 (Indianapolis)
- Last race: 1921 Indianapolis 500 (Indianapolis)
Wins	Podiums	Poles
0	0	0

24 Hours of Le Mans career
- Years: 1925–1930
- Teams: Sunbeam, Ariès, Bentley, Paget
- Best finish: 2nd (1925)
- Class wins: 1 (1925)

Julien Jean Chassagne (26 July 1881 – 13 April 1947) was a pioneer submariner, aviator, and French racing driver active 1906–1930. Chassagne finished third in the 1913 French Grand Prix; won the 1922 Tourist Trophy and finished second in the 1925 Le Mans Grand Prix d'Endurance - all in Sunbeam motorcars. He was second in the 1921 Italian Grand Prix with a Ballot, and set speed records and won races at Brooklands and hill climbs internationally.

Chassagne was also associated with the Bentley Boys, who are described as having captured the spirit of the times, partying as hard as they worked. Larger than life, their restless and often reckless love of speed and adventure complemented the big green Bentleys from Cricklewood perfectly. As a result of his association with Bentley Motors, Chassagne Square in Crewe was named in his honour.

Chassagne applied to serve as a pilot during the Great War but under the request of the British Admiralty he joined Sunbeam to advise, develop and test aero engines for the war effort.

== Career overview ==
Chassagne's long career spans the early road races as a riding mechanic on Darracq, Clément-Bayard and Hispano-Suiza automobiles, before he joined Sunbeam (later to become S.T.D.), where he achieved his most notable success as a racing driver, including winning the 1922 Tourist Trophy. Chassagne raced well into his forties with Bentley and others in Le Mans and elsewhere. His first Grand Prix was the very first French Grand Prix in Le Mans 1906. His last was in 1930, during which period he also was responsible for numerous speed records.

Chassagne's mechanical knowledge, gained early in his education and augmented during his service with the French Navy on early submarines, stood him in good stead both in racing and the development and testing of the latest technology in early aviation for Demoiselles Santons-Dumont monoplanes, the first Hanriot monoplanes and Clément-Bayard. He was also involved in the development and testing of racing cars, namely Grand Prix Sunbeams and the Bugatti type 35.

Chassagne was not born into wealth. Despite this, he known to be meticulous, resilient, and calm ‘Chass’ was regarded by his friends and colleagues.

== Early life 1881–1900 ==
Born 26 July 1881, Chassagne was brought up at La Croisille-sur-Briance, Haute-Vienne, Limoges, France and later in Burgundy, France in modest circumstances. His father, a horse trainer, was killed in a riding accident when Jean was still young. He attended L'Ecole Professionnelle de St Leonard de Noblat followed by the highly regarded L'Ecole des Arts et Métiers which was formative in his later life at the cutting edge of motorised racing.

== French Navy and submarines 1900–1905 ==
In November 1900, the 19-year-old Chassagne joined the French Navy. He was trained as a mechanic, working in 1901 at the Flotte Workshops as a mechanic and then in 1903 as a Torpedo Boat Mechanic (first in class). He volunteered to serve on the cruiser Montcalm for two years, based at Saigon, as well as sailing to America, Africa, China and Japan.

In 1905, Chassagne volunteered as a submariner and was stationed for ten months on three different submarines. Firstly, on Espadon a Sirène-class submarine, 157 tons with 13 crew; then on Gymnote which was the world first all-electric submarine and finally on Gustave Zédé, which was the second submarine to be introduced to the French Navy.

== Pioneering motorcar racing and aviation 1906–1912 ==
On 26–27 June 1906, the first French Grand Prix de l'ACF was held in Le Mans; Rene Hanriot driving a Darracq was joined by his longtime friend Chassagne as a riding mechanic but had to retire due to engine trouble. Chassagne continued working at Darracq as a mechanic for two years until 1908 acting as riding mechanic during the heroic pioneering age of racing to Hanriot, Hautvost and Demogeot. In 1908 Chassagne travelled to the US for the American Grand Prize, Savannah, where he was again a riding mechanic to Hautvost on a Clément-Bayard.

During this period, Chassagne was also working at Clément-Bayard, Senat workshops for airships and race-car engines on the development, assembly and testing of the experimental Demoiselles Santons-Dumont monoplanes. Development, assembly and testing of the first Hanriot Monoplanes, Reims followed and in August 1910 Chassagne received his pilot licence certificate no. 160.

Chassagne subsequently participated in various events including the Baie de Seine estuary crossing; winning the Liege altitude & speed prizes. Chassagne crashed in Deauville due to engine problem but escaped with only a few splinters from the wooden frame in his thighs. He was then appointed Chief Pilot to Hanriot Flying School where he trained many of the early pioneering aviators and in 1911 he became Director of the Algeciras Flying School, Spain where he was responsible for the training of Spanish officers. In 1912 Chassagne was again flying with Clément-Bayard where he was responsible for the testing and development of the new aero engines in long-distance flights such as Paris to Reims, Paris to Mourmelon to Reims to Soissons and to Paris, as well as, remarkably Issy to Reims. That year Jean Chassagne met Louis Coatalen, joined the Sunbeam racing team and withdrew from flying.

Throughout this period, Chassagne combined his aviation activities with racing and with the Hispano Suiza Racing Team in 1910 he competed at Coupe des Voiturettes, Bolougne gaining second place and in the Catalan Cup Race a fourth; later taking part in the famous Mont Ventoux Hillclimb. It is at Hispano Suiza that Chassagne was acquainted with Works drivers Pilleverdier and Zucarelli the latter becoming with Georges Boillot, Jules Goux & Ernest Henry the Peugeot ‘Les Charlatans’ who revolutionized racing with the twin cam over head, four valve per cylinder engine design.

== Racing with Sunbeam 1912–1919 ==
In 1909, the British Sunbeam firm engaged the energetic and ambitious Breton Louis Hervé Coatalen, (1879–1962) as a chief engineer. Racing enthusiast Coatalen was to transform the Wolverhampton firm to become the foremost British exponents of motor racing internationally at the highest echelons. It was Coatalen who in 1912 engaged his countryman Jean Chassagne as part of his winning racing team. In 1912 Coatalen entered a team of four race modified 12/16 Sunbeam cars to compete in the Coupe de l'Auto which was run concurrently with the historic 1912 French Grand Prix de l'ACF at Dieppe. Victor Rigal with Jean Chassagne as riding mechanic not only won the Coupe de l'Auto outright but was placed third in the Grand Prix against the large Grand Prix cars with engines three and five times the capacity of the Sunbeam.

Motorboat racing in Monaco was a convenient test bed for engine technology and in 1913 Coatalen and Chassagne in a Sunbeam powered boat took part in the event. That same year, Chassagne was promoted to a Sunbeam Works Team driver and in the French Grand Prix at Amiens Chassagne came first of the Sunbeams and third overall. Later that year at the Coupe de l'Auto at Boulogne Chassagne, with his riding mechanic A P Mitchell, retired on the seventh lap when lying third with a rear axle failure.

On 2 October 1913, at Brooklands Chassagne alternating in two-hour spells with Dario Resta and K. Lee Guinness of the eponymous Stout dynasty, set up a series of long distance World Records with a Sunbeam Grand Prix fitted with a Single- Seater body. Two days later again at Brooklands, Chassagne with the Sunbeam Toodles V, won an event against Percy E. Lambert's Land Speed Record holder Talbot. On the same day and with the same car Chassagne made the fastest Brooklands race lap to that date. A few days later, Chassagne and Toodles V set up further long distance World Records.

In 1914, Chassagne continued to set up World Records for Sunbeam at Brooklands with Toodles V. Chassagne took part in the Monaco Motor boat races with ‘Toto’ a 2.5L dohc four valve per cylinder Sunbeam powered racing boat; this may have been a test run for this new engine design; similar designed engines, built in the manner of the Pegueot ‘Charlatans’, from which the design was derived, were used in that year's Grand Prix Sunbeam racing motorcars. Travelling to the US for the 1914 Indianapolis 500 Mile, Chassagne with his riding mechanic A P Mitchell in ‘Spotty’ a 1913 Sunbeam G.P. car, qualified at 88.310 mph (142.121 km/h) but crashed on the twentieth lap due to burst tyre. Shortly after in the historic French Grand Prix in the newly designed 4 cyl 4.5 L dohc Sunbeam, Chassagne made fastest lap but retired on the thirteenth lap due to big-end failure.

The Great War was looming and on commencement, Chassagne enlisted in the Artillery Corp despite several requests to join the Flying Corp; shortly after in 1915, under the request of the British Admiralty he joined Sunbeam to advise, develop and test aero engines for the war effort.

== Post-war racing 1919–1922 ==
Armistice was signed on 11 November 1918, ending the Great War. Soon after, in 1919, the first postwar Indianapolis 500 was held. However, postwar conditions in France were less amenable and the first Grand Prix was not staged until 1921. In 1920 Sunbeam merged with Talbot and Darracq to form the S.T.D. combine headed by Louis Coatalen as a managing director.

During the war in 1916, Sunbeam designed a 4.9 L engine in the Ernest Henry manner which performed well in that year's Indianapolis 500; J Christiaens finishing fourth; this engine type was fitted in 1919 in two shorter 1914 Sunbeam T.T. chassis and entered for Jean Chassagne and Dario Resta for the 1919 Indianapolis 500. The cars were shipped to the United States but were not submitted for scrutineering and withdrawn for unknown reason. Jean Chassagne was consequently recruited by the newly formed Ballot Racing Team to drive one of their newly designed Ernest Henry straight eight 4.9 L cars; accident on the 63rd lap due to steering problem resulted in what became Chassagne's most serious accident in his entire career but despite having been ejected some 150 yards (140 m) from his car he was largely unhurt. Chassagne remind with the Ballot team and in 1921 became their top driver.

A year later, in the 1920 Indianapolis 500 capacity limit was reduced to 183 cu (3-litre). The design of the Ballot entry was similar to the year before but scaled down to 3-litre; Chassagne was running in the first five places throughout the race but damaged steering dropped him to seventh place winning $1,900. Back in Brooklands in the larger 4.9 L Ballot and with riding mechanic Robert Laly who was to become a lifelong friend, Chassagne made the fastest BARC lap of the year and finished second in the three handicap races. In the Gaillon Hillclimb, he made 22.6 sec at 99 mph (159 km/h).

Back in Indianapolis in 1921 with a private entry Peugeot 4 cyl, Chassagne lost his bonnet and was forced by the regulations to retire. The long-awaited French Grand Prix took place at Le Mans, on a circuit that was to become known as the Le Mans '24 hours Endurance'; Chassagne on the 3-litre Ballot thrilled the crowds with a neck to neck duel with Jimmy Murphy on his Duesenberg; on lap 17 Chassagne was leading but he was forced to retire with punctured petrol tank. Chassagne had his break in the 1921 Italian Grand Prix with the Ballot where he came second and the Gaillon Hillclimb where he made third fastest time of the day. In November 1921 Chassagne, married the half English, half French Emma; over the years, Emma escorted her husband on some racing events and they remained married until Chassagne died in 1947.

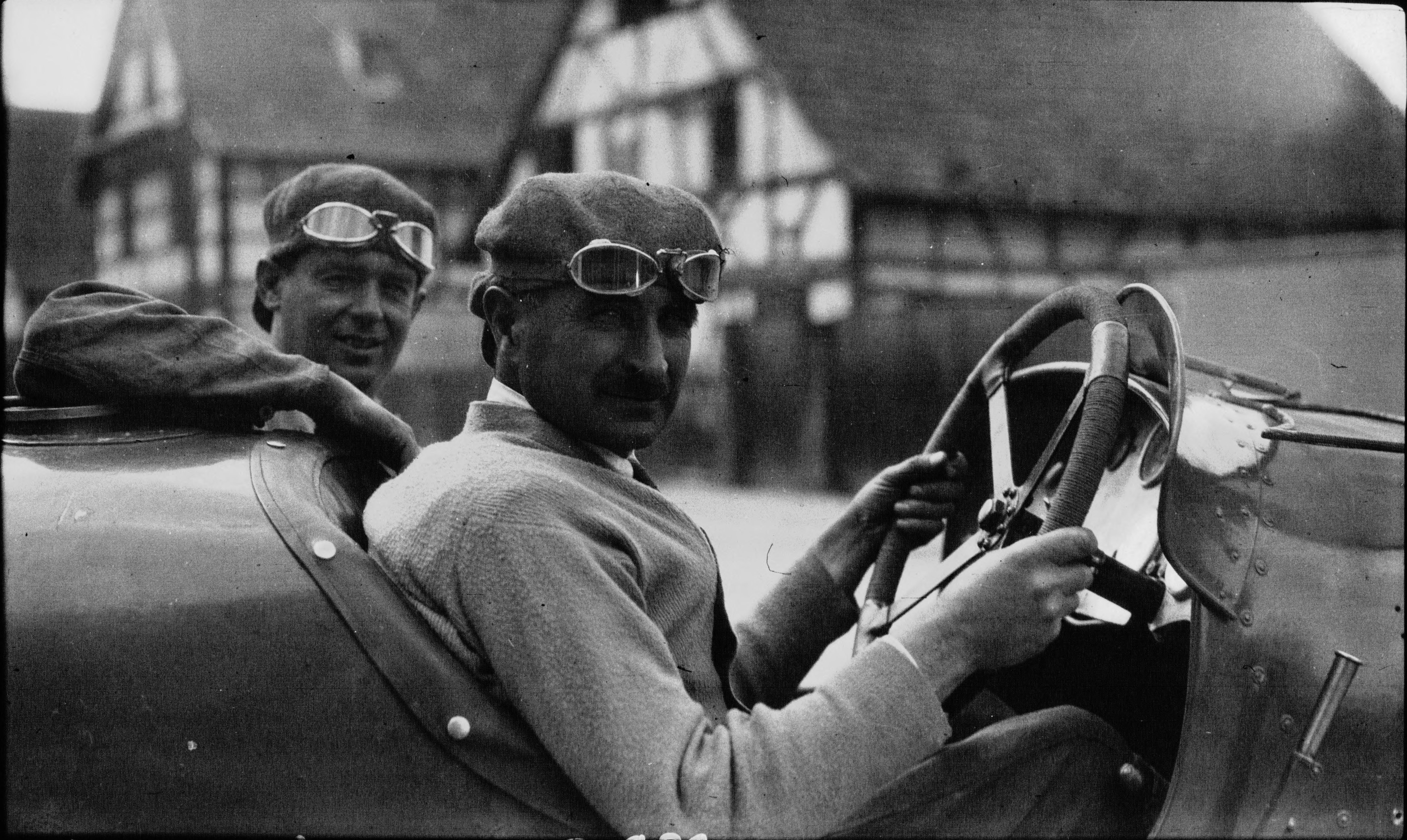
Jean Chassagne at the 1922 French Grand Prix

1922 was a successful year for Jean Chassagne with S.T.D. and at 41 years of age, he achieved his greatest victory with the Isle of Man Tourist Trophy. The year started with a win at Brooklands Easter Meeting with the aero-engined Sunbeam 350 hp which proceeded to break numerous Speed Records, including the first car to set a new World Speed Record over the 150 mph mark.

On 22 June after 5:24:50hr in what he famously described as "a nightmare in sea of mud", Chassagne won the first postwar Tourist Trophy and the last motorcar Tourist Trophy to be run on the Isle of Man with Sunbeam III a 1921 Sunbeam Grand Prix straight eight 3-litre modified for the event; Chassagne ordinarily a measured and meticulous driver was fazed by the atrocious weather conditions on the island that day but it remained "one of the greatest victories of his career". Chassagne was entered in several voiturette racing for S.T.D. with the invincible 1921 1.5 L Talbot Darracqs, in effect a half sized engine of Chassagne's winning Tourist Trophy car, but none gained him success.

Responding to the formula change of the 1922 French Grand Prix held in Strasbourg Coatalen engaged Ernest Henry, then at his peak, to design the new 2-litre Grand Prix Sunbeam engine. Pre Great War Henry, together with 'Les Charlatans' was responsible for the development of the game changing Peugeot race engines with double overhead cam and four valve per cylinder. Postwar he was acclaimed for the highly influential Ballot engines.

Chassagne knew Henry for many years and he acted as liaison between Henry in S.T.D. Surenes near Paris and the S.T.D. Wolverhampton Experimental Department, ultimately testing the prototype car in Brooklands and helping to develop the Sunbeam Grand Prix team entry. In the event, Chassagne drove Sunbeam I but the three cars retired after being the second fastest behind the winning Fiats. The cars were entered at the subsequent Grand Premio d’Italia Monza but did not appear. Instead, Sunbeam competed in the 1922 November 19 Coppa Florio in Sicily where Chassagne after holing the oil tank of his dreadnought grey 4.9 L 1922 Tourist Trophy Sunbeam with a stone on the rough Madonia Mountains track, and having replenished with olive oil locally purchased, finished fourth but was unplaced.

== Endurance racing 1923–1927 ==
Chassagne's move toward endurance racing was neither abrupt nor absolute. Rather than indicating a fundamental change in his career, it reflected the broader shift in international motor racing during the latter half of the vintage era, as interest increasingly moved from Grand Prix events toward endurance competition. Throughout this period, Chassagne remained closely associated with advanced racing technology and continues to demonstrate the qualities for which he was widely respected: steadiness, confidence, resilience, technical understanding, inventiveness and composure. These attributes were well suited not only to endurance racing, but also to the demanding long-distance road Grand Prix of the period.

Chassagne took a sabbatical in 1923 and his only recorded entry was a first in class in the Circuit des Routes Pavees, with a Citroen B Type Two-Seater. In 1924 Chassagne was involved together with Bugatti himself with the preparation, development and tuning of the iconic type 35 Bugatti in advance of its inaugural French Grand Prix at Lyon; the tyres were insufficiently vulcanised and after changing 15 deflated tyres himself, Chassagne finished seventh – the highest placed Bugatti; the situation was not dissimilar at the Spanish Grand Prix at San Sebastian; a race which saw some particularly harsh accidents, injuries and fatality due to poor road preparation.

In 1925, the third Le Mans Grand Prix d’Endurance took place and S.T.D. entered two Sunbeam Super Sport one for Jean Chassagne and Sammy C H Davis, the other for H.O.D. Segrave and G Duller. It is said that the Sunbeam 3-litre Super Sport was designed by Vincenso Bertarione and produced by Sunbeam under instruction of Louis Coatalen mainly to beat Bentley in endurance racing and this Chassagne and Davis did coming second overall to a Lorraine-Dietrich in their ailing Sunbeam after a hotly contested race with the Bentley team. With the new Bertarione/ Becchia 1923 S.T.D. Talbot Darracq 1.5 L voiturette, Jean Chassagne had good success in 1925 obtaining fastest time of the day at the Gometz le Chatel Hillclimb and second fastest at the famous Gaillon Hillclimb but he ran out of fuel on the last lap in the Touring Car Grand Prix, Montlhéry which was run on distance, ballast & fuel formula. Further speed events with the Talbot Darracq Works Team yielded in 1926 success but also a serious accident in a rainy Avus whilst he was lying third.

For the 1926 Le Mans Grand Prix d’Endurance, Chassagne was entered with an Aries Surbaissée 2 L car; further races with Aries Surbaissée continued in 1927 achieving excellent results in endurance racing in Belgium, France and Spain.

== The Bentley years 1928–1930 ==
By the time Chassagne joined the ranks of the 'Bentley boys' (age 47), Bentley's reputation in endurance racing was unequalled and his successes in Le Mans legendary. It is therefore interesting to contemplate the implication of this union between Chassagne the old racing master with his erstwhile competitors. That Chassagne was not 'past it' was made abundantly clear in the first Le Mans he took part in for Bentley sharing a car with another racing legend Henry Tim Birkin. The fifth overall achieved whilst no doubt respectable tells little of the heroic performance Chassagne exhibited in this race, which to a very large extent exemplify the man. Birkin having suffered a rim collapse at Arnage abandoned the car which was not equipped with a jack and returned to the pits where "Old Chassagne" took two jacks under his arms famously commenting "Maintenant, c'est a moi" (Now, it’s my turn) "he ran the 3 miles to the ditched Bentley, jacked the car up, changed the wheel and drove on". W. O. Bentley awarded Chassagne with a silver trophy in recognition of this extraordinary feat.

In 1929 Le Mans, Chassagne was sharing a Bentley with Francis Clement; the Bentley team holding virtually from the beginning the first four positions. Back with a Ballot at the Grand Prix, Chassagne retired with a mechanical problem.

W. O. Bentley was against supercharging his 4.5-litre cars and it was left to Henry Tim Birkin sponsored by the Hon. Dorothy Paget to initiate the construction of a team of Blower Bentleys designed by Amherst Villiers and built at the Birkin's Works, Welwyn Garden City. At the 1930 Brooklands Double Twelve Chassagne shared Birkin's favourite Blower Bentley but the Mechan's frame broke and the car retired at 4.30 pm of the first day's racing. Again sharing a car with Birkin at the Le Mans Grand Prix d’Endurance, the car put up the fastest lap at 89.69 mph (144.34 km/h) overtaking Caracciola at nearly 120 mph (190 km/h) but retired on lap 138 with a broken valve. The Bentley Works Team was retired but the Birkin Blowers were entered in the 1930 Phoenix Park Irish Grand Prix where they had a close race with the Mercedes 7 litre supercharged; Chassagne car suffered from a lubrication problem. This was to be his last recorded race.

== Retirement and death 1931–1947 ==
Feeling he was slowing down, Chassagne retired from racing at the end of 1930 age 49 after a long career racing with some of the finest teams and in 1931 he took a position as representative of Castrol Oils for the Aircraft Industry; he also ran the Bentley Motors Sales & Servicing Department at Neuilly. He was made Chevalier de la Légion d'honneur in 1935 in recognition of his achievements in motorsport. After the Nazi occupation of France in 1939 Chassagne moved from his Paris home Maison Lafitte back to La Croisille -sur-Briance, Limoges his birthplace. He died age 65 on 13 April 1947. He was posthumously honoured - a square in Crewe was named after him in commemoration of his association with Bentley Motors racing; in Limoges, France there is the Rue de Chassagne and in La Croisille sur Briance the Chassagne stadium keeps his memory alive.

== Honours ==
- Chevalier de la Légion d'honneur
- Chassagne Square Crewe in commemoration of association with Bentley Motors racing
- Rue de Chassagne Limoges France
- Chassagne Stadium. La Croisille sur Briance

== Motorsports career results ==
=== Indianapolis 500 results ===
Year	Car	Start	Qual	Rank	Finish	Laps	Led	Retired
1914	12	1	88.310	17	29	20	0	Crash T4
1920	26	4	95.450	4	7	200	1	Running
1921	19	6	91.000	13	18	65	0	Lost hood
Totals						285	1	

Starts	3
Poles	1
Front Row	1
Wins	0
Top 5	0
Top 10	1
Retired	2

=== Motorcar, motorboat and aircraft racing ===
1906

- 26/27 June French Grand Prix de l’ACF, Le Mans, Darracq race no. 4C riding mechanic to Rene Hanriot; retired due to engine trouble.

1908

- American Grand Prize, Savannah, Clément-Bayard car no.13 riding mechanic to Hautvost

1910

- ‘Baie de Seine’ estuary airplane crossing
- Liege altitude & speed prizes first.
- Coupe des Voiturettes, Bolougne, Hispano Suiza 60 bhp, second
- Catalan Cup Race, Hispano Suiza 60 bhp, fourth
- Mont Ventoux Hillclimb

1912

- ‘Endurance’ Flights: Paris – Reims; Paris - Mourmelon – Reims - Soissons – Paris; Issy- Reims.
- 25/26 June, Coupe de l'Auto & French Grand Prix de l’ACF Dieppe, Sunbeam 4cyl 3L, Car no. 3, riding mechanic to Victor Rigal, first in Coupe de l’Auto and third in the concurrent Grand Prix

1913

- April, Monaco, ‘Sunbeam’ Racing Boat powered with two eight cylinders Sunbeam engines with L Coatalen
- 13 June, French Grand Prix de l’ACF, Amiens, Sunbeam 6cyl 4.5L, car no. 15, timed 88.07 mph, average 70.3 mph over 570miles (29laps), third (and first of the Sunbeams)
- 21 September, Coupe de l’Auto Boulogne, Sunbeam 4cyl 3L, Car no. 4, Jean Chassagne & A P Mitchell, retired seventh lap when lying third, rear axle
- 2 October, Brooklands, ‘World’s Record’, Sunbeam Grand Prix 6cyl 4.5L with Single- Seater body, 2-hour spells with D Resta & K. Lee Guinness, 2–12 hours records at 89.85-97.55 mph
- 4 October, Brooklands, Autumn Meeting 13th 100 mph Short Handicap, 1913 Sunbeam V12 Toodles V 9L, distance 8.5mile lapped 114.49 mph. On scratch with Lambert's Talbot. first
- 4 October, Brooklands, Autumn Meeting 13th 100 mph Long Handicap, 1913 Sunbeam V12 Toodles V lapped at 118.58 mph – fastest Brooklands race lap to date.
- 10 October, Brooklands ‘World’s Records’, 1913 V12 Toodles V 9L, 50-150miles at 105.57-108.38 mph. ‘The Hour’ at 107.95 mph.

1914

- 16 March, Brooklands, Class H Records, 1913 V12 Toodles V 9L, 0.5-5mile records at 114.08-119.76 mph. 120.73 mph over the mile.
- Monaco ‘Toto’ Sunbeam racing boat 2.5L doch
- 30 May, Indianapolis 500 Mile, 1913 Sunbeam G.P. (Spotty) 6cyl 4.5L, car no. 12, qualifying speed 88.310 mph, with A P Mitchell, crashed, tyre burst on 20th lap
- 4 July, French Grand Prix de l’ACF, Lyons, Sunbeam 4cyl 4.5L dohc, Car no. 10, Jean Chassagne & A P Mitchell, fastest lap at 65.03 mph, retired 13th lap, big end run

1919

- 31 May, Indianapolis 500-Mile, With Dario Resta to drive 4.9L Sunbeam – withdrawn and instead drove the Henry designed Ballot 8cyl 4.9L, accident 63rd lap (steering)

1920

- 30 May, Indianapolis 500 Mile, Ballot 8cyl 3L, car no 26, qualifying speed 95.450 mph, averaged 79.94 mph seventh, winning $1,900
- September Brooklands BARC Autumn Race, Ballot 4.9L with Robert Laly 112.17 mph – fastest BARC lap of the year. second (in three handicap races)
- October Gaillon Hillclimb, Ballot 22.6sec 99 mph

1921

- 30 May, Indianapolis 500 Mile, Peugeot 4cyl (private entry), car no. 19, qualifying speed 91.100 mph, lost hood, 18th and retired
- 26 July, French Grand Prix de l’ACF, Ballot 3L 8cyl no. 8 (with Robert Laly) punctured petrol tank on lap 17 while leading – retired.
- 4 September, Italian Grand Prix Brescia, Ballot 8cyl 3L, car no. 8(with Robert Laly), 3:40:52 hours 519 km (30 laps), second
- Gaillon Hillclimb Ballot third fastest time

1922

- 17 April, Brooklands, Easter Meeting 13th Lightning Short Handicap, Sunbeam 350 hp V12 18.3L, 5.75 miles 103.83 mph, lapped at 114 mph. first.
- 17 April, Brooklands, Easter Meeting 13th Lightning Long Handicap, Sunbeam 350 hp 12cyl 18.3L, retired, Tread of offside front tyre stripped
- 17 April, Brooklands, Easter Meeting, Light Car Scratch, Talbot Darracq 1.5L 4cyl lapped 89.74 mph
- 22 June, Isle of Man Tourist Trophy, Sunbeam III 8cyl 3L car, no. 7, Jean Chassagne & Robert Laly, 302 miles (8 laps) 5:24:50 hours, 55.76 mph, first
- 15 July, French Grand Prix de l’ACF, Strasbourg, Sunbeam 4cyl 2L (which he helped Ernest Henry to develop), Car no. 9, Jean Chassagne & R. Laly, retired fifth lap, broken inlet valve
- 19 August Brooklands, JCC 200 Mile Race, Talbot Darracq no.5 1.5L 4cyl (with Paul Dutoit) accident on lap 44 –tyre deflation
- 10 September, Il Gran Premio d’Italia, Monza 800 km (80 laps), Sunbeam – did not appear
- 18 September Coupe des Voiturettes, Le Mans Talbot Darracq 1.5L 4cyl, reserve driver
- 5 November, Penya Rhin Voiturette Grand Prix, Spain, 517.65 km (35 laps) Talbot Darracq 1.5L 4cyl, dnf first lap – valve
- 19 November, Coppa Florio, Sicily, Sunbeam 6cyl 4.9L 6cyl, car no. 1, 268.5 miles (4 laps), fourth

1923

- Circuit des Routes Pavees, Citroen B Type Two-Seater, first in class

1924

- 4 August, French Grand Prix de l’ACF, Lyons, Bugatti Type 35 2L 8cyl (inaugural race), 7:46:25.06 hrs, seventh tyre problems (changed 15 covers).
- San Sebastian Grand Prix, Spain, Bugatti Type 35 2L 8cyl, 6:46:30hrs sixth tyre problems

1925

- 20/21 June, Le Mans Grand Prix d’Endurance, Sunbeam SS 6cyl 3L, car no. 16 (with S C H Davis), 1343 miles average 55.9 mph, first in class second overall
- July Touring Car Grand Prix, Montlhéry, distance, ballast & fuel formula, Talbot-Darracq 1.5L, run out of fuel on last lap
- Gaillon Hillclimb, Talbot-Darracq 1.5L, 4cyl, second fastest
- Gometz le Chatel Hillclimb, Talbot-Darracq 1.5L, 4cyl, first fastest

1926

- Val Suzon Hillclimb, Talbot-Darracq 1.5L, 4cyl, second fastest and fastest in sportscar class
- Inaugural Grosser Preis von Deutschland, Avus, Berlin, Talbot-Darracq 1.5L, 4cyl, accident when lying third
- 12/13 June, Le Mans Grand Prix d’Endurance, Aries Surbaissée 2L, car no 10, with Robert Laly, retired lap 65

1927

- 24 hours de Belgique, Spa, Aries Surbaissée 3L, (with R. Laly), first in class second overall
- 18/19 June, Le Mans Grand Prix d’Endurance, Aries Surbaissée 3L, car no 4 (with R. Laly), retired lap 122 (comfortably in the lead for 17 hours when a seized camshaft drive put them out of running)
- San Sebastian 12 - hours, Spain, Aries Surbaissée 3L, (with Duray), second

1928

- 16/17 June, Le Mans Grand Prix d’Endurance, Bentley Motors Ltd Team, Bentley 4.5L, car no. 3 (with Henry Tim Birkin), fifth in class, fifth overall (heroically rescuing the damaged car)

1929

- 15/16 June, Le Mans Grand Prix d’Endurance, Bentley Motors Ltd Team, Bentley 4.5L, car no. 8 (with Francis Clement), third in class, fourth overall
- 30 June, French Grand Prix de l’ACF, Le Mans, Ballot 8cyl, no. 4, retired eighth lap -mechanical

1930

- Brooklands Double Twelve, Hon Miss Dorothy Paget Team, Bentley Blower C, with Tim Birkin, retired- broken chassis
- 21/22 June, Le Mans Grand Prix d’Endurance, Hon Miss Dorothy Paget Team, Bentley Blower C, car no. 9, with Tim Birkin, DNF
- July Irish Grand Prix, Phoenix Park, Dublin, Ireland, Hon Miss Dorothy Paget Team, Bentley Blower C car no.7

== Internet sources ==
- 1922 Strasbourg Grand Prix Sunbeam - YouTube
- Sunbeam Talbot Darracq Register
- Bibliothèque nationale de France
- LAT Photographic Archive
- Austin Harris
- Art And The French Grand Prix 1921 D Doyle
- Grand Prix History
- Grand Prix Sunbeams - YouTube
- New Zealand Papers Past

== Further references ==
- The Classic Twin-Cam Engine Griffith Borgeson 1981
- Sunbeam Racing Cars, Anthony S Heal, 1989
- The History of Brooklands 1906–1940, William Boddy, 1957
- Bentley The Vintage Years 1919-1931 Michael Hay
- Le Miroir de la Route, numero 123, 15 Juin 1930, ‘Les "As" du Volant’ - La Brillante Carriere de Jean Chassagne’ by Charles Tardieu
- L’automobiliste no. 23 Mai/Juin 1971, Jean Chassagne by Robert Jarraud
- VSCC 2002 Bulletin summer & autumn Jean Chassagne & Ernest Henry by Oliver Heal
- Mathieson -Taylor Archive
- Un Siecle De Grands Pilotes Francais 1895-1995
