= Jules Ellingboe =

American racing driver (1892–1948)

- Born: Julian Arthur Ellingboe; March 8, 1892 Crookston, Minnesota, U.S.
- Died: April 23, 1948 (aged 56) Creswell, Oregon, U.S.

Champ Car career
- 8 races run over 7 years
- Best finish: 25th (tie) (1921)
- First race: 1921 Indianapolis 500 (Indianapolis)
- Last race: 1927 Indianapolis 500 (Indianapolis)
Wins	Podiums	Poles
0	0	0

Julian Arthur “Jules” Ellingboe (March 8, 1892 – April 23, 1948) was an American racing driver. Despite competing in six Indianapolis 500 races, he competed in few other Championship Car events, just a handful of board track events in 1922 and 1923.

== Biography ==
Ellingboe was born on March 8, 1892, in Crookston, Minnesota. He died on April 23, 1948, in Creswell, Oregon.

== Motorsports career results ==
=== Indianapolis 500 results ===
Year	Car	Start	Qual	Rank	Finish	Laps	Led	Retired
1921	22	5	95.400	8	19	49	0	Steering
1922	23	20	95.500	14	26	25	0	Crash T4
1924	18	7	102.600	7	11	200	0	Running
1925	10	7	107.832	8	22	24	0	Steering
1926	7	6	106.376	6	22	39	0	Supercharger
1927	18	21	113.239	6	29	25	0	Crash T4
Totals						362	0	

Starts	6
Poles	0
Front Row	0
Wins	0
Top 5	0
Top 10	0
Retired	5
