= 1922 Indianapolis 500 =

American motor race

10th Indianapolis 500
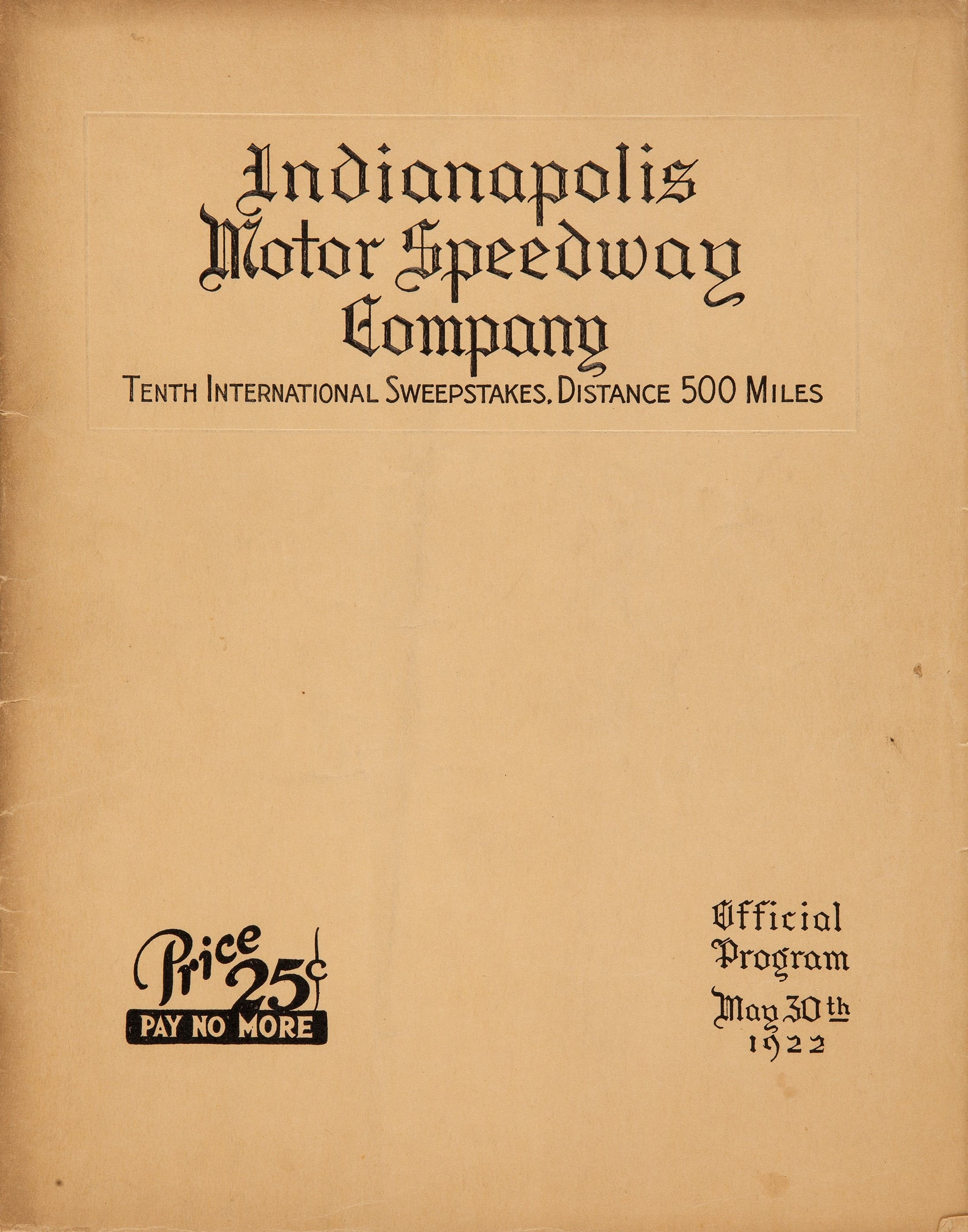

Indianapolis Motor Speedway

Indianapolis 500
- Sanctioning body: AAA
- Date: May 30, 1922
- Winner: Jimmy Murphy
- Winning Riding Mechanic: Ernie Olson
- Winning Entrant: Jimmy Murphy
- Winning time: 5:17:30.79
- Average speed: 94.484 mph (152.057 km/h)
- Pole position: Jimmy Murphy
- Pole speed: 100.500 mph (161.739 km/h)
- Most laps led: Jimmy Murphy (153)

Pre-race
- Pace car: National Sextet
- Pace car driver: Barney Oldfield
- Starter: Eddie Rickenbacker
- Honorary referee: Richard Kennerdell
- Estimated attendance: 135,000

Chronology
Previous	Next
1921	1923

The 10th International 500-Mile Sweepstakes Race was held at the Indianapolis Motor Speedway on Tuesday, May 30, 1922.

Jimmy Murphy is the first driver to win the race from the pole position. He was accompanied by riding mechanic Ernie Olson.

== Time trials ==
Four-lap (10 mile) qualifying runs were utilized.

== Starting grid ==
Row	Inside		Middle		Outside	
1	35	(United States) Jimmy Murphy	12	(United States) Harry Hartz R	17	(United States) Ralph DePalma W
2	4	(United States) Leon Duray R	5	(United States) Ralph Mulford	2	(United States) Roscoe Sarles
3	24	(United States) Jerry Wunderlich R	9	(United States) Frank Elliott R	1	(United States) Ira Vail
4	7	(United States) Pete DePaolo R	34	(United States) Cliff Durant	26	(United States) Tom Alley
5	21	(United States) I. P. Fetterman R	31	(United States) Ora Haibe	27	(United States) L. L. Corum R
6	3	(United States) Erwin Baker R	10	(United States) Joe Thomas	25	(United States) Wilbur D'Alene
7	22	(United Kingdom) Douglas Hawkes R	23	(United States) Jules Ellingboe	19	(United States) C. Glenn Howard R
8	14	(France) Jules Goux W	15	(United States) Eddie Hearne	8	(United States) Tommy Milton W
9	6	(United States) Art Klein	16	(United States) Howdy Wilcox W	18	(United States) Jack Curtner R

R Indianapolis 500 rookie
W Indianapolis 500 winner

== Box score ==
Finish	Start	No	Name	Entrant	Car	Qual	Rank	Laps	Status
1	1	35	(United States) Jimmy Murphy	Jimmy Murphy	Duesenberg–Miller	100.500	1	200	94.484 mph
2	2	12	(United States) Harry Hartz R	Duesenberg Brothers	Duesenberg	99.970	2	200	+3:13.60
3	23	15	(United States) Eddie Hearne	Jules Goux	Ballot	95.600	13	200	+4:55.27
4	3	17	(United States) Ralph DePalma W	Ralph DePalma	Duesenberg	99.550	3	200	+13:33.86
5	14	31	(United States) Ora Haibe (Jules Ellingboe Laps 178–200)	Duesenberg Brothers	Duesenberg	92.900	18	200	+13:42.66
6	7	24	(United States) Jerry Wunderlich R (Jules Ellingboe Laps 101–165)	Duesenberg Brothers	Duesenberg	97.760	7	200	+20:22.05
7	13	21	(United States) I. P. Fetterman R (Phil Shafer Laps 107–175)	Duesenberg Brothers	Duesenberg	93.280	17	200	+23:24.75
8	9	1	(United States) Ira Vail (Dave Koetzla Laps 104–200)	Disteel Flyers, Inc.	Duesenberg	96.750	10	200	+30:48.37
9	12	26	(United States) Tom Alley	William Small Company	Frontenac	94.050	16	200	+38:22.67
10	17	10	(United States) Joe Thomas (Wade Morton Laps 17–112) (Pete DePaolo Laps 113–200)	Duesenberg Brothers	Duesenberg	88.800	21	200	+45:53.44
11	16	3	(United States) Erwin Baker R	Louis Chevrolet	Frontenac	89.600	20	200	+1:00:57.61
12	11	34	(United States) Cliff Durant (Dave Lewis)	R. Cliff Durant	Miller	95.850	12	200	+1:08:03.13
13	19	22	(United Kingdom) Douglas Hawkes R	Bentley	Bentley	81.900	26	200	+1:22:54.76
14	21	18	(United States) Jack Curtner R (Homer Ormsby)	Jack Curtner	Fronty-Ford T	—	—	160	Flagged
15	18	25	(United States) Wilbur D'Alene	William Small Company	Frontenac	87.800	22	160	Flagged
16	8	9	(United States) Frank Elliott R (Art Klein) (Roscoe Sarles)	Ira Vail	Miller	97.750	8	195	Rear axle
17	15	27	(United States) L. L. Corum R	William Small Company	Frontenac	89.650	19	169	Engine trouble
18	27	19	(United States) C. Glenn Howard R	Chevrolet Brothers Mfg. Co.	Fronty-Ford T	83.90	27	165	Engine trouble
19	5	5	(United States) Ralph Mulford	Louis Chevrolet	Frontenac	99.200	5	161	Rod
20	10	7	(United States) Peter DePaolo R	Louis Chevrolet	Frontenac	96.200	11	110	Crash T3
21	25	6	(United States) Art Klein	Louis Chevrolet	Frontenac	87.150	23	105	Rod
22	4	4	(United States) Leon Duray R	Louis Chevrolet	Frontenac	99.250	4	94	Axle
23	6	2	(United States) Roscoe Sarles	Louis Chevrolet	Frontenac	98.000	6	88	Rod
24	24	8	(United States) Tommy Milton W	Tommy Milton	Milton–Miller	94.400	15	44	Gas tank
25	22	14	(France) Jules Goux W	Jules Goux	Ballot	96.950	9	25	Axle
26	20	23	(United States) Jules Ellingboe	Duesenberg Brothers	Duesenberg	95.500	14	25	Crash T4
27	26	16	(United States) Howdy Wilcox W	Howdy Wilcox	Peugeot	86.100	24	7	Valve spring

Note: Relief drivers in parentheses

W Former Indianapolis 500 winner

R Indianapolis 500 Rookie

=== Statistics ===
Lap Leaders
Laps	Leader
1–74	Jimmy Murphy
75–76	Leon Duray
77–83	Harry Hartz
84–86	Pete DePaolo
87–121	Harry Hartz
122–200	Jimmy Murphy

Total laps led
Leader	Laps
Jimmy Murphy	153
Harry Hartz	42
Pete DePaolo	3
Leon Duray	2

== Race details ==
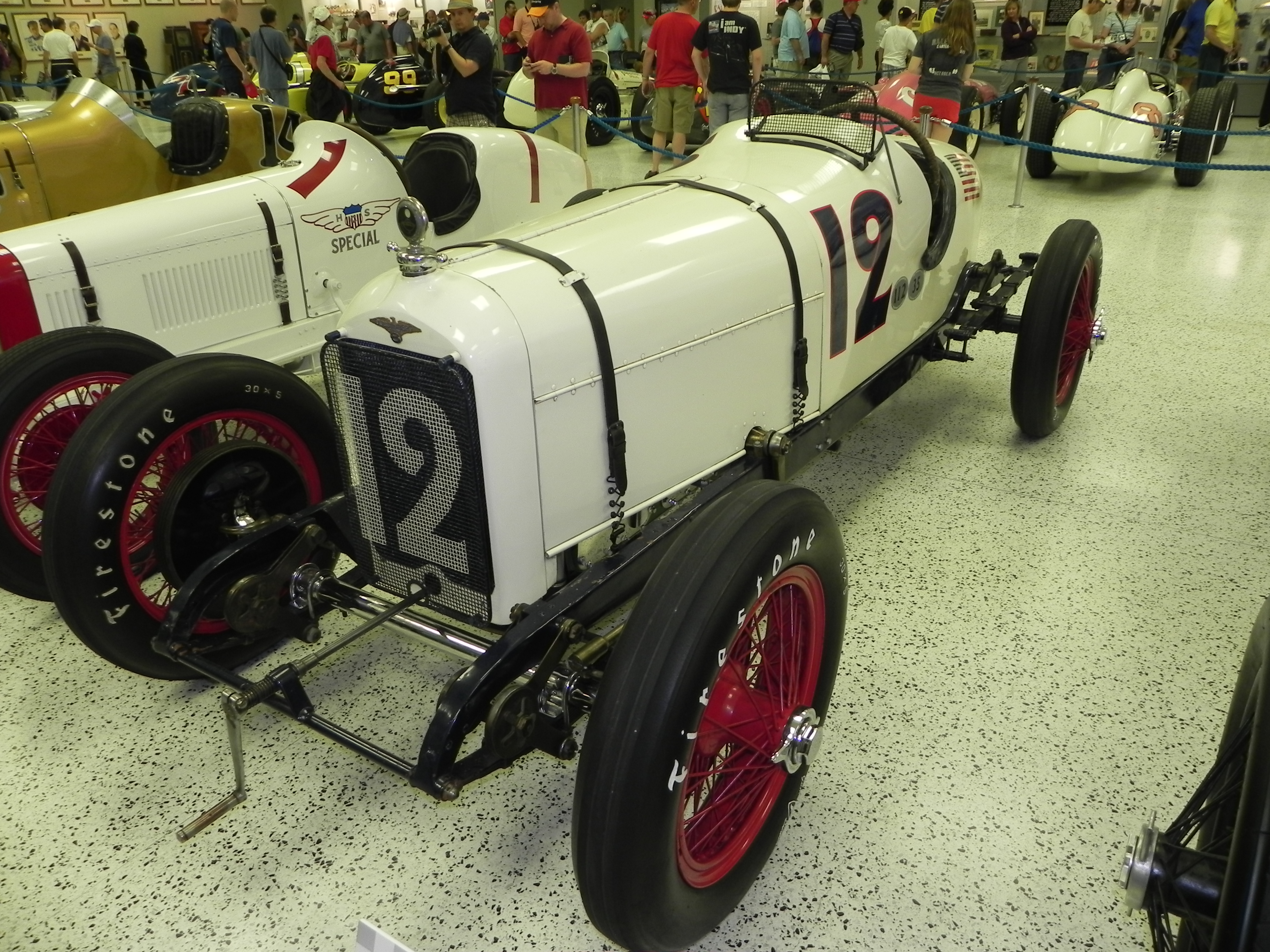
1922 winning car

- For 1922, riding mechanics were required.
- First alternate: none

1921 Indianapolis 500; Tommy Milton	1922 Indianapolis 500; Jimmy Murphy	1923 Indianapolis 500; Tommy Milton
Preceded by 89.840 mph (1915 Indianapolis 500)	Record for the fastest average speed 94.484 mph	Succeeded by 98.234 mph (1924 Indianapolis 500)
