= Riley Brett =

American racing driver (1895–1982)

- Born: Riley Jackson Brett; June 11, 1895 McAlester, Indian Territory, U.S.
- Died: February 5, 1982 (aged 86) Los Angeles, California, U.S.

Champ Car career
- 2 races run over 2 years
- First race: 1921 Indianapolis 500 (Indianapolis)
- Last race: 1922 Kansas City 300 (Kansas City)
Wins	Podiums	Poles
0	0	0

Riley Jackson Brett (June 11, 1895 – February 5, 1982) was an American racing driver.

== Motorsports career results ==
=== Indianapolis 500 results ===
Year	Car	Start	Qual	Rank	Finish	Laps	Led	Retired
1921	17	16	87.800	16	15	92	0	Hit Wall, Damaged
Totals						92	0	

Starts	1
Poles	0
Front Row	0
Wins	0
Top 5	0
Top 10	0
Retired	1
