= Louis Fountaine =

American racing driver (1882–1960)

- Born: December 20, 1882 Cato Township, Michigan, U.S.
- Died: March 2, 1960 (aged 77) Waukesha, Wisconsin, U.S.

Champ Car career
- 6 races run over 3 years
- First race: 1914 Elgin National Trophy (Elgin)
- Last race: 1921 Indianapolis 500 (Indianapolis)
| Wins | Podiums | Poles |
|---|---|---|
| 0 | 0 | 0 |

Louis Fountaine (December 20, 1882 – March 2, 1960) was an American racing driver. Fountaine competed in six early Championship Car races from 1914 to 1921, as well as the 1912 American Grand Prize.

== Motorsports career results ==
=== Indianapolis 500 results ===
| Year | Car | Start | Qual | Rank | Finish | Laps | Led | Retired |
|---|---|---|---|---|---|---|---|---|
| 1921 | 18 | 7 | 88.300 | 15 | 21 | 33 | 0 | Crash FS |
| Totals | | | | | | 33 | 0 | |

| Starts | 1 |
| Poles | 0 |
| Front Row | 0 |
| Wins | 0 |
| Top 5 | 0 |
| Top 10 | 0 |
| Retired | 1 |
