= Percy Ford (racing driver) =

American racing driver (1888–1962)

- Born: Percy James Ford; March 15, 1888 Chicago, Illinois, U.S.
- Died: March 8, 1962 (aged 73) Kansas City, Missouri, U.S.

Champ Car career
- 3 races run over 4 years
- Best finish: 13th (1921)
- First race: 1917 20-mile Sprint (Speedway Park)
- Last race: 1921 Indianapolis 500 (Indianapolis)
| Wins | Podiums | Poles |
|---|---|---|
| 0 | 1 | 0 |

Percy James Ford (March 15, 1888 – March 8, 1962) was an American racing driver.

== Motorsports career results ==
=== Indianapolis 500 results ===
| Year | Car | Start | Qual | Rank | Finish | Laps | Led | Retired |
|---|---|---|---|---|---|---|---|---|
| 1921 | 23 | 8 | 87.000 | 19 | 3 | 200 | 0 | Running |
| Totals | | | | | | 200 | 0 | |

| Starts | 1 |
| Poles | 0 |
| Front Row | 0 |
| Wins | 0 |
| Top 5 | 1 |
| Top 10 | 1 |
| Retired | 0 |
