= I. P. Fetterman =

American racing driver (1887–1924)

- Born: Isaac Phillips Fetterman; September 1, 1887 Pittsburgh, Pennsylvania, U.S.
- Died: December 5, 1924 (aged 37) Mt. Lebanon, Pennsylvania, U.S.

Champ Car career
- 12 races run over 5 years
- Best finish: 6th (1921)
- First race: 1918 Liberty Sweepstakes, Heat #1 (Uniontown)
- Last race: 1922 Kansas City 300 (Kansas City)
- First win: 1919 Independence Auto Derby, Heat #3 (Uniontown)
- Last win: 1921 Autumn Classic (Uniontown)
Wins	Podiums	Poles
2	7	0

Isaac Phillips Fetterman (September 1, 1887 – December 5, 1924) was an American racing driver who participated in the 1922 Indianapolis 500.

== Biography ==
Fetterman was born on September 1, 1887, in Pittsburgh, Pennsylvania to Charles Douglass Fetterman and Medora E. Phillips. During World War I he served as a captain in the Royal Flying Corps.

In 1917, Fetterman broke several records at Uniontown Speedway.

On September 5, 1921, Fetterman won the Autumn Classic at Uniontown Speedway.

Fetterman participated in the 1922 Indianapolis 500 using a Duesenberg Straight-8 engine. He finished seventh, winning $1,800.

Fetterman died on December 5, 1924, in Mt. Lebanon, Pennsylvania at age 37.

== Motorsports career results ==
=== Indianapolis 500 results ===
Year	Car	Start	Qual	Rank	Finish	Laps	Led	Retired
1922	21	13	93.280	17	7	200	0	Running
Totals						200	0	

Starts	1
Poles	0
Front Row	0
Wins	0
Top 5	0
Top 10	1
Retired	0
