= C. Glenn Howard =

American racing driver (1897–1946)

- Born: Charles Glenn Howard; July 24, 1897 Indianapolis, Indiana, U.S.
- Died: March 30, 1946 (aged 48) Trenton, Michigan, U.S.

Champ Car career
- 1 race run over 2 years
- First race: 1922 Indianapolis 500 (Indianapolis)
Wins	Podiums	Poles
0	0	0

Charles Glenn Howard (July 24, 1897 – March 30, 1946) was an American racing driver. He attempted to make the 1920 Indianapolis 500, but failed to qualify. He qualified for the 1922 race driving a Fronty-Ford. Those were his only two Championship Car appearances.

Howard died at the age of 48 in Trenton, Michigan of a heart attack.

== Motorsports career results ==
=== Indianapolis 500 results ===
Year	Car	Start	Qual	Rank	Finish	Laps	Led	Retired
1920	24	DNQ	0.000	–	–	–	–	Failed to qualify
1922	19	27	83.900	25	18	165	0	Engine Trouble
Totals						165	0	

Starts	1
Poles	0
Front Row	0
Wins	0
Top 5	0
Top 10	0
Retired	1
