= 1921 Indianapolis 500 =

American motor race

9th Indianapolis 500
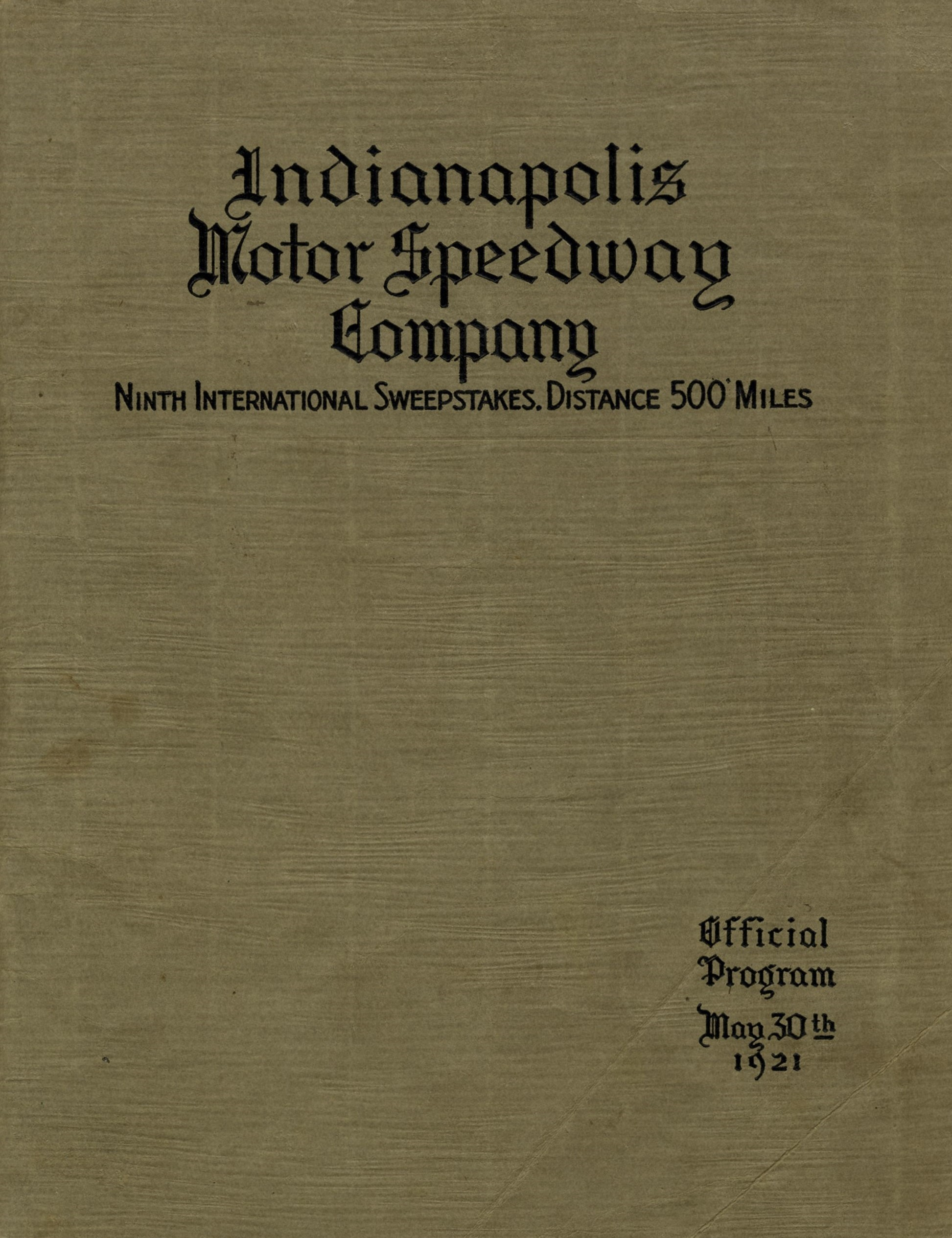

Indianapolis Motor Speedway

Indianapolis 500
- Sanctioning body: AAA
- Date: May 30, 1921
- Winner: Tommy Milton
- Winning Riding Mechanic: Harry Franck
- Winning Entrant: Louis Chevrolet
- Winning time: 5:34:44.65
- Average speed: 89.621 mph (144.231 km/h)
- Pole position: Ralph DePalma
- Pole speed: 100.750 mph (162.141 km/h)
- Most laps led: Ralph DePalma (108)

Pre-race
- Pace car: H.C.S. 6
- Pace car driver: Harry C. Stutz
- Starter: Thomas J. Hay
- Honorary referee: David Beecroft
- Estimated attendance: 135,000-150,000 ("last year was 125k")

Chronology
| Previous | Next |
|---|---|
| 1920 | 1922 |

The 9th International 500-Mile Sweepstakes Race was held at the Indianapolis Motor Speedway on Monday, May 30, 1921.

Ralph DePalma dominated another early running of the 500, but again failed to win. He led 109 laps, and had a two-lap lead at the halfway point. A connecting rod broke, and he dropped out on lap 112. DePalma retired with one win, and 612 laps led in the "500." His laps led record would not be matched for 66 years until Al Unser Sr. reached it in 1987.

Tommy Milton won the first of two 500 victories. He was accompanied by riding mechanic Harry Franck. The only European car to finish was a 1921 Grand Prix Sunbeam driven by Ora Haibe who was placed fifth.

== Time trials ==
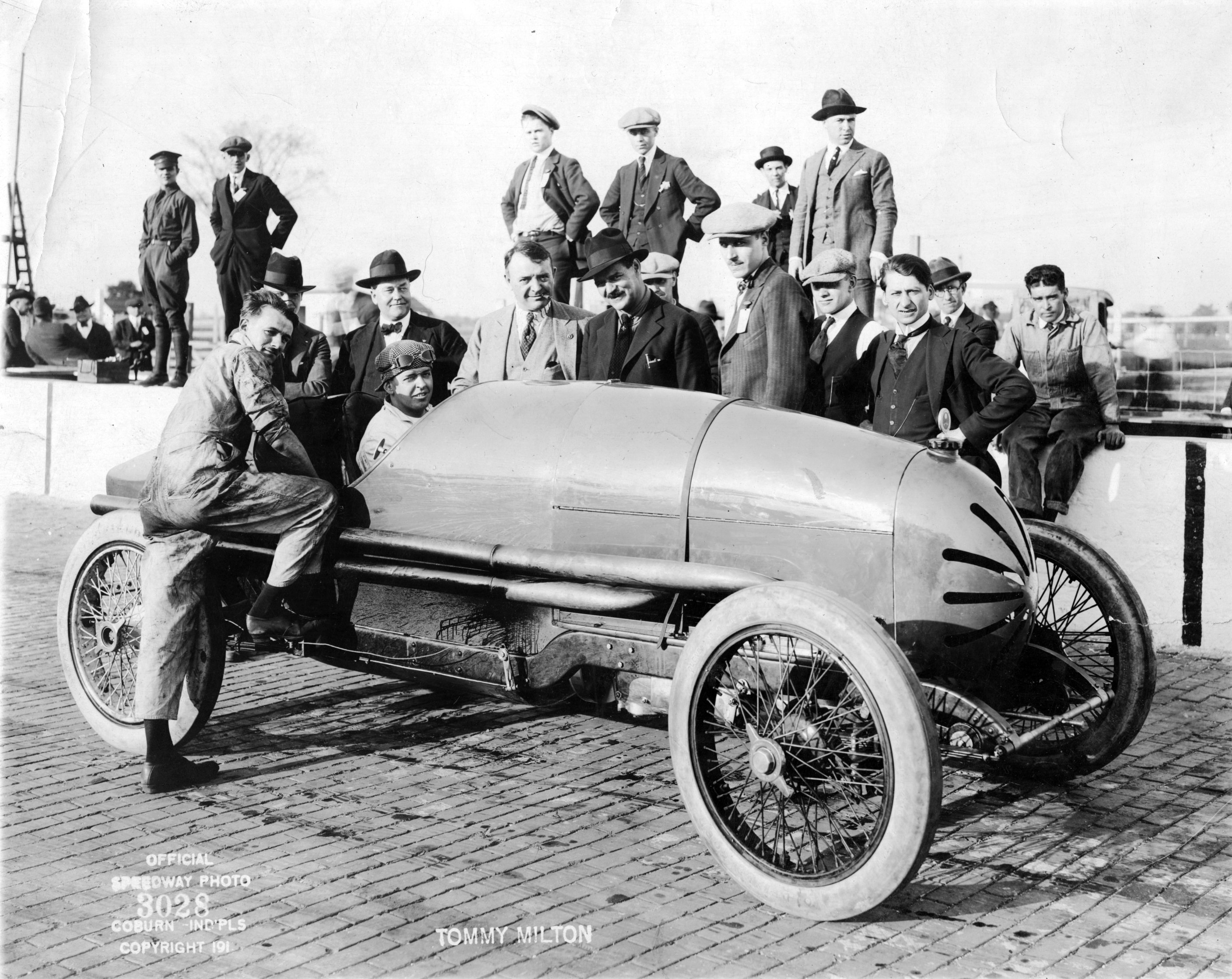
The 1921 winning car

Time trials was scheduled for five days, May 25–29. Four-lap (10 mile) qualifying runs were utilized. A short field of only 26 cars submitted entries, but only 23 cars arrived and prepared to qualify. Mervin Headley's entry was disallowed because only half the entry fee was paid. Two other entries were no-shows.

Ralph DePalma completed his qualifying run on Wednesday May 25, at an average speed of 100.75 mph. He won the pole position as the only driver over the 100 mph mark. None of his four laps matched the track record (104.78 mph) set in 1919.

This would be the first 500 that featured the familiar starting grid of rows of cars three-abreast.

Qualifying Results
| Date | Driver | Lap 1 (mph) | Lap 2 (mph) | Lap 3 (mph) | Lap 4 (mph) | Average Speed (mph) |
| 5/26/1921 | Ralph DePalma | 100.89 | 100.53 | 100.56 | 101.00 | 100.75 |

== Starting grid ==
| Row | Inside | | Middle | | Outside | |
|---|---|---|---|---|---|---|
| 1 | 4 | (United States) Ralph DePalma W | 6 | (United States) Roscoe Sarles | 7 | (United States) Joe Boyer |
| 2 | 1 | (United States) Eddie Hearne | 22 | (United States) Jules Ellingboe R | 19 | (France) Jean Chassagne |
| 3 | 18 | (United States) Louis Fountaine R | 23 | (United States) Percy Ford R | 5 | (United States) Eddie Miller R |
| 4 | 3 | (United States) Ira Vail | 14 | (France) André Boillot | 10 | (United States) Howdy Wilcox W |
| 5 | 16 | (United States) Ora Haibe | 9 | (France) Albert Guyot | 21 | (United States) Bennett Hill |
| 6 | 17 | (United States) Riley Brett R | 15 | (France) René Thomas W | 27 | (United States) Tom Alley |
| 7 | 24 | (United States) Jimmy Murphy | 2 | (United States) Tommy Milton | 8 | (United States) Ralph Mulford |
| 8 | 25 | (United States) Joe Thomas | 28 | (United States) C. W. Van Ranst R | | |

R Indianapolis 500 rookie
W Indianapolis 500 winner

== Box score ==
| Finish | Start | No | Name | Entrant | Car | Qual | Rank | Laps | Status |
|---|---|---|---|---|---|---|---|---|---|
| 1 | 20 | 2 | (United States) Tommy Milton | Louis Chevrolet | Frontenac | 93.050 | 11 | 200 | 89.621 mph |
| 2 | 2 | 6 | (United States) Roscoe Sarles | Duesenberg Brothers | Duesenberg | 98.350 | 2 | 200 | +3:49.38 |
| 3 | 8 | 23 | (United States) Percy Ford R (Jules Ellingboe) (Andy Burt) | Stanley Kandul | Frontenac | 87.000 | 19 | 200 | +18:05.65 |
| 4 | 9 | 5 | (United States) Eddie Miller R (Jimmy Murphy) | Duesenberg Brothers | Duesenberg | 83.850 | 20 | 200 | +19:40.33 |
| 5 | 13 | 16 | (United States) Ora Haibe | Sunbeam Motor Car Company | Sunbeam | 93.500 | 10 | 200 | +21:13.55 |
| 6 | 14 | 9 | (France) Albert Guyot (Joe Boyer) (Eddie Miller) | Duesenberg Brothers | Duesenberg | 87.800 | 16 | 200 | +26:33.05 |
| 7 | 10 | 3 | (United States) Ira Vail | Ira Vail | Leach–Miller | 82.350 | 22 | 200 | +39:32.82 |
| 8 | 15 | 21 | (United States) Bennett Hill (Jerry Wunderlich) | John Thiele | Duesenberg | 87.780 | 17 | 200 | +44:22.09 |
| 9 | 21 | 8 | (United States) Ralph Mulford | Louis Chevrolet | Frontenac | 91.700 | 12 | 177 | Flagged |
| 10 | 17 | 15 | (France) René Thomas W | Sunbeam Motor Car Company | Sunbeam | 83.750 | 21 | 144 | Water hose |
| 11 | 18 | 27 | (United States) Tom Alley | L. L. Corum | Frontenac | 80.500 | 23 | 133 | Rod |
| 12 | 1 | 4 | (United States) Ralph DePalma W | Ralph DePalma | Ballot | 100.750 | 1 | 112 | Rod |
| 13 | 4 | 1 | (United States) Eddie Hearne | E. A. Hearne | Duesenberg | 96.180 | 6 | 111 | Oil line |
| 14 | 19 | 24 | (United States) Jimmy Murphy (Eddie Pullen) | Duesenberg Brothers | Duesenberg | 93.600 | 9 | 107 | Crash T4 |
| 15 | 16 | 17 | (United States) Riley Brett R (Harry Thicksten) | George L. Wade | Brett | 87.750 | 18 | 91 | Hit wall |
| 16 | 23 | 28 | (United States) C. W. Van Ranst R | C. W. Van Ranst | Frontenac | 88.350 | 14 | 87 | Water hose |
| 17 | 3 | 7 | (United States) Joe Boyer | Duesenberg Brothers | Duesenberg | 96.650 | 4 | 74 | Rear axle |
| 18 | 6 | 19 | (France) Jean Chassagne | Jean Chassagne | Peugeot | 91.000 | 13 | 65 | Lost hood |
| 19 | 5 | 22 | (United States) Jules Ellingboe R | Jules Ellingboe | Frontenac | 95.400 | 8 | 49 | Steering |
| 20 | 11 | 14 | (France) André Boillot | Louis Coatalen | Sunbeam | 97.600 | 3 | 41 | Rod bearing |
| 21 | 7 | 18 | (United States) Louis Fountaine R | George L. Wade | Brett | 88.300 | 15 | 33 | Crash FS |
| 22 | 22 | 25 | (United States) Joe Thomas | Duesenberg Brothers | Duesenberg | 96.250 | 5 | 25 | Crash T3 |
| 23 | 12 | 10 | (United States) Howdy Wilcox W | Jules Goux | Peugeot | 96.000 | 7 | 22 | Rod |

Note: Relief drivers in parentheses

W Former Indianapolis 500 winner

R Indianapolis 500 Rookie

=== Statistics ===
Lap Leaders
| Laps | Leader |
|---|---|
| 1 | Ralph DePalma |
| 2 | Joe Boyer |
| 3–5 | Ralph DePalma |
| 6 | Roscoe Sarles |
| 7–110 | Ralph DePalma |
| 111–200 | Tommy Milton |

Total laps led
| Leader | Laps |
|---|---|
| Ralph DePalma | 108 |
| Tommy Milton | 90 |
| Joe Boyer | 1 |
| Roscoe Sarles | 1 |

== Race details ==
- For 1921, riding mechanics were required.
- First alternate: none

| 1920 Indianapolis 500; Gaston Chevrolet | 1921 Indianapolis 500; Tommy Milton | 1922 Indianapolis 500; Jimmy Murphy |
