= Tacoma Speedway =

Wooden board track for automobile racing in Tacoma

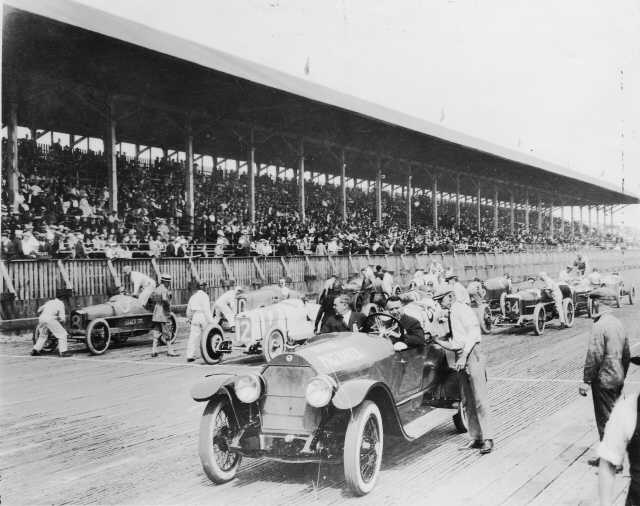
- Barney Oldfield sits behind the wheel of the pace car at Tacoma Speedway, July 4, 1922
- Location: Tacoma, Washington, United States
- Coordinates: 47.175°N 122.497°W
- Capacity: 35,000+
- Opened: 1915
- Closed: 1922

Irregular Oval
- Surface: Wood
- Length: 2.00 mi (3.22 km)
- Turns: 4
- Race lap record: <1:10; >103 mph (165.7 km/h) (Tommy Milton, Duesenberg/Miller, 1922)

Tacoma Speedway (sometimes called Pacific Speedway or Tacoma-Pacific Speedway) was a 2-mile (3.2 km) (approximate) wooden board track for automobile racing that operated from 1914 to 1922 near Tacoma, Washington. In its time, the track was renowned nationwide and was considered by some to be second only to the Indianapolis Motor Speedway. Notable racers such as Barney Oldfield, Eddie Rickenbacker, Ralph DePalma, and both Louis and Gaston Chevrolet, were drawn to race for purses of up to $25,000 (approximately $573,000 in 2012 dollars). Before long, the track acquired a reputation for being dangerous. After an arson fire destroyed the wooden grandstands in 1920, the facility was rebuilt but failed financially and racing ended two years later. The site later became an airport and then a naval supply depot during World War II, and today is occupied by the campus of Clover Park Technical College and neighboring commercial sites in Lakewood, Washington.

== Beginnings 1912–1914 ==
In 1912, a group of businessmen formed the Tacoma Carnival Association and created a 5-mile (8.0 km) dirt race course roughly bounded by today's Lakeview Avenue, Steilacoom Boulevard, Gravelly Lake Drive and S.W. 112th Street. This course was reduced in size for each of the next two years and became the final 2-mile (3.2 km) layout in 1914. On July 4 of that year, over 35,000 spectators came out to see racing, Vaudeville acts and fireworks. In 1915, the dirt track was upgraded to a wood track with turns banked up 18 feet (5.5 m), using 2 million board feet (4,720 m^{3}) of lumber and 15 tons (14,000 kg) of nails. At the time of construction, it was one of just eleven wood tracks in the United States. Promoters claimed it would be one of the fastest race tracks, if not the fastest, in the nation.

== Heydays 1915–1920 ==
Three major races were held on the brand new track in 1915, the most important of which was the 250-mile (400 km) Montamarathon Classic on July 4, won by Glover Ruckstell driving a Mercer. That day also saw the track's first racer fatalities (spectators had been killed in 1912 and 1914), when a car carrying Billy Carlson and his riding mechanic left the track after incurring a punctured tire. Carlson was one of several drivers who had urged the track be paved with creosoted wood blocks instead of split boards, for safety reasons. One other driver died at the track in 1917, also due to a puncture.

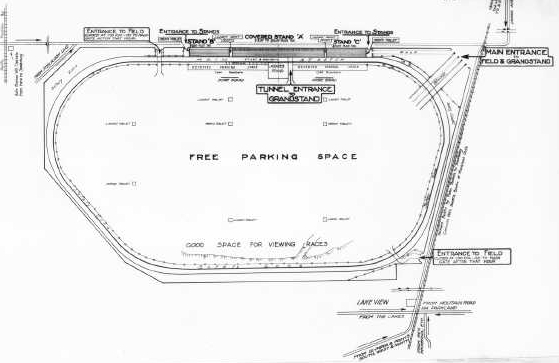
A map of Tacoma Speedway as it was rebuilt following an arson fire in 1920.

In time, it was realized that the nature of the track's construction was problematic. Other board tracks were constructed with continuous wood surfaces, but in Tacoma the boards were spaced apart to save on materials. The gaps between the boards were filled with gravel, and there were constant problems with flying gravel and splinters, which caused many injuries, flat tires and accidents. Two-time Indianapolis 500 winner Tommy Milton once said, “Driving on the boards was always terrible, and then there was Tacoma.” Speaking about the board tracks of the period, veteran driver and riding mechanic Eddie Miller said:

"You used to get hit with some terrific blocks and knots of wood. We all came in with pieces of wood bigger than kitchen matches driven into our face and foreheads. They'd go in, hit the bone and then spread out. Then you had to remove them, of course. Tacoma was worse. You had the splinters and knots and all, but to save on lumber they had spaced out the 2x4s and caulked them with some mixture of tar and crushed rock. When Tacoma began to go it was like a meteor shower."

Race promoters often added sideshow attractions and staged exhibitions to help draw paying spectators. One such event in 1916 involved the head-on collision of two locomotives on a mile (1.6 km) of railroad track temporary laid in the race course infield.

Although World War I put a damper on auto racing across much of the country, and briefly stopped it altogether in October 1918, the sport was not significantly interrupted in Tacoma. As a show of patriotism, in 1918 and 1919 races were run with cars flying the flags of Allied nations. Former-racer-turned-war-hero Eddie Rickenbacker returned in 1919 to serve as a race official.

== Demise 1920–1922 ==
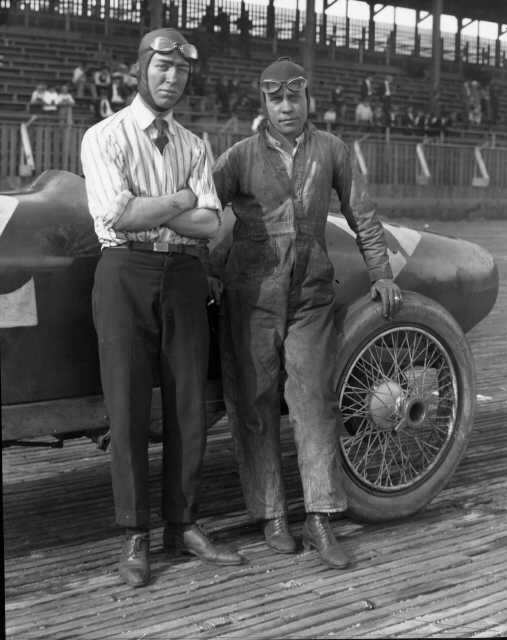
1922 winner Jimmy Murphy and his riding 'mechanician' Eddie Olson. It was standard practice for each car to carry along a crewman during races.

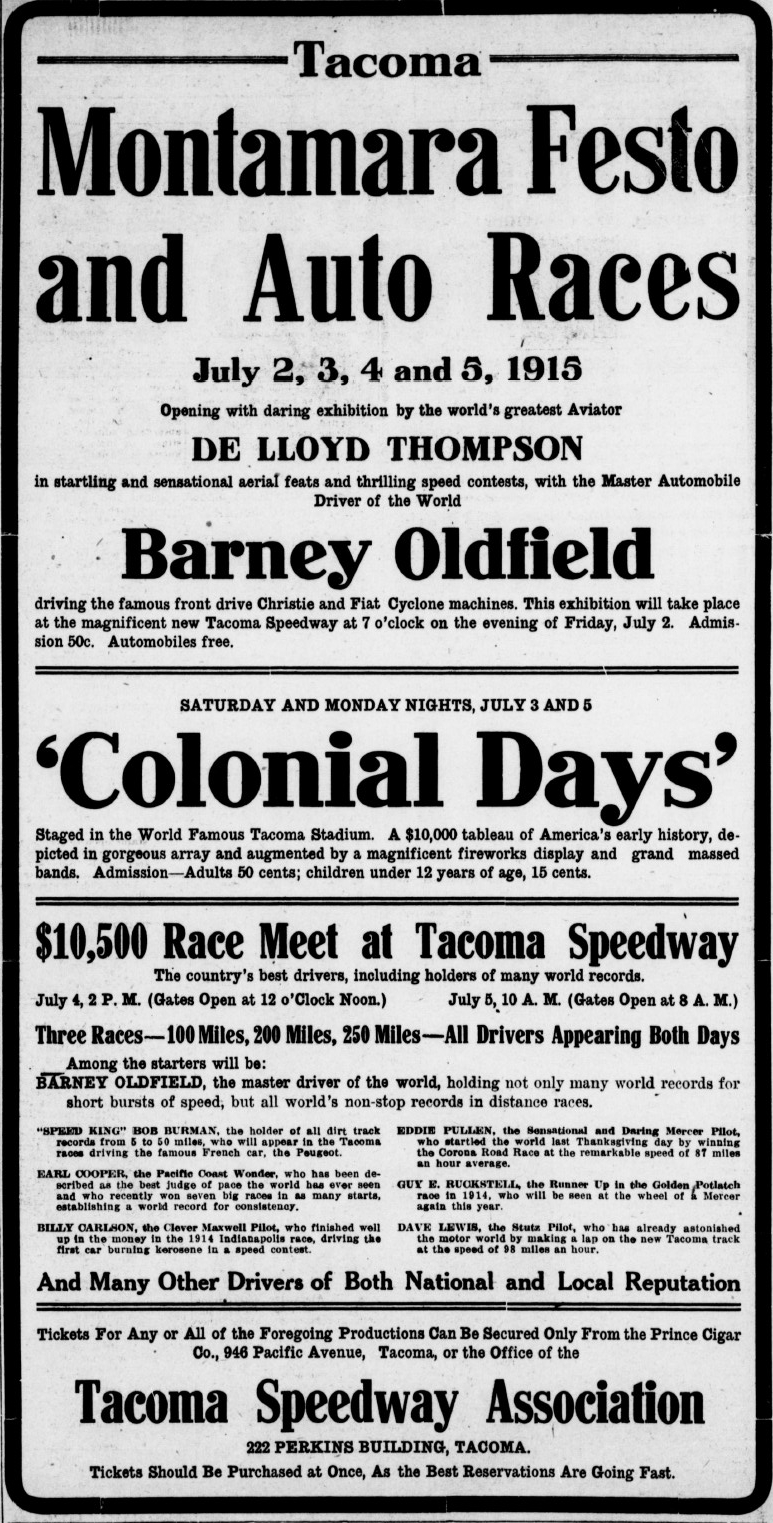
A 1915 advertisement from The Tacoma Times.

In March 1920, the speedway's grandstands were destroyed in an arson fire. Though the loss was uninsured, funds to rebuild were raised by selling bonds, and new grandstands were constructed in time for racing that summer. The rebuilt facility was a major upgrade from the one that burned down, with 960 feet (290 m) of covered seating, new fencing, pedestrian tunnels, and an automobile bridge over Turn 4 that allowed spectator parking in the infield. Despite the improved facilities, the track lost money and was unable to continue operations after the race on July 4, 1922, which was the only race held that year. The original Tacoma Montamarathon Trophy is currently kept at the Indianapolis Motor Speedway Hall of Fame Museum.

In 1927, part of the property became Mueller-Harkins Airport, then later, Tacoma Municipal Airport. The U.S. federal government seized the airport for use in World War II as the Pacific Naval Advance Base, and the site became Clover Park Technical College in 1962.

== Track record ==
The best known lap speed at Tacoma Speedway was set in July 1922 during time trials for what would be the track's final race, when the top nine qualifiers all exceeded 103 miles per hour (166 km/h). By way of comparison, Jimmy Murphy's pole speed at the Indianapolis 500 that year was 100.491 miles per hour (161.725 km/h). Murphy qualified for the middle of the front row at Tacoma; the pole sitter and presumed record-holder is Tommy Milton, who won at Indianapolis in 1921 and 1923. Barney Oldfield is said to have been clocked at 113.9 miles per hour (183.3 km/h) on the speedway in 1915, but it is unclear if this was a lap speed (unlikely) or if it was over a shorter measured distance.

== See also ==
- AAA Contest Board
- American Championship car racing
