= Leach (automobile) =

Defunct American motor vehicle manufacturer

Leach-Biltwell Motor Company
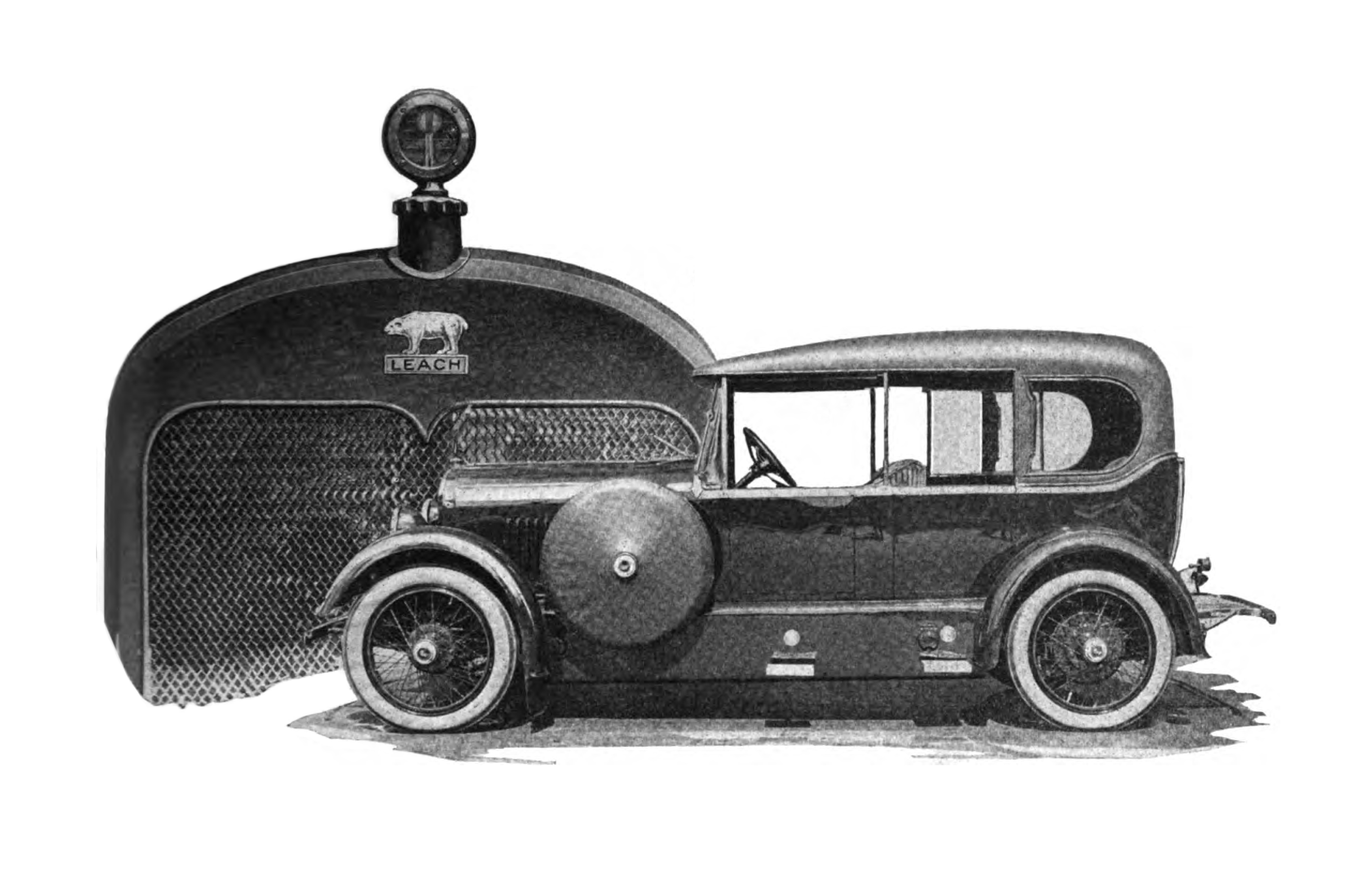
- Leach-Biltwell 1922 advertisement
- Company type: Stock company
- Industry: Automobile manufacturing
- Predecessor: Leach Motor Car Co.
- Founded: Los Angeles, California, U.S. (1919)
- Founder: Martin Andrew Leach
- Defunct: 1924
- Fate: Ceased trading
- Headquarters: Los Angeles, California, U.S.
- Products: Leach Power-Plus Six

Leach-Biltwell Motor Company manufactured and distributed the Leach luxury automobile from 1919 to 1924 in Los Angeles, California.

== History ==
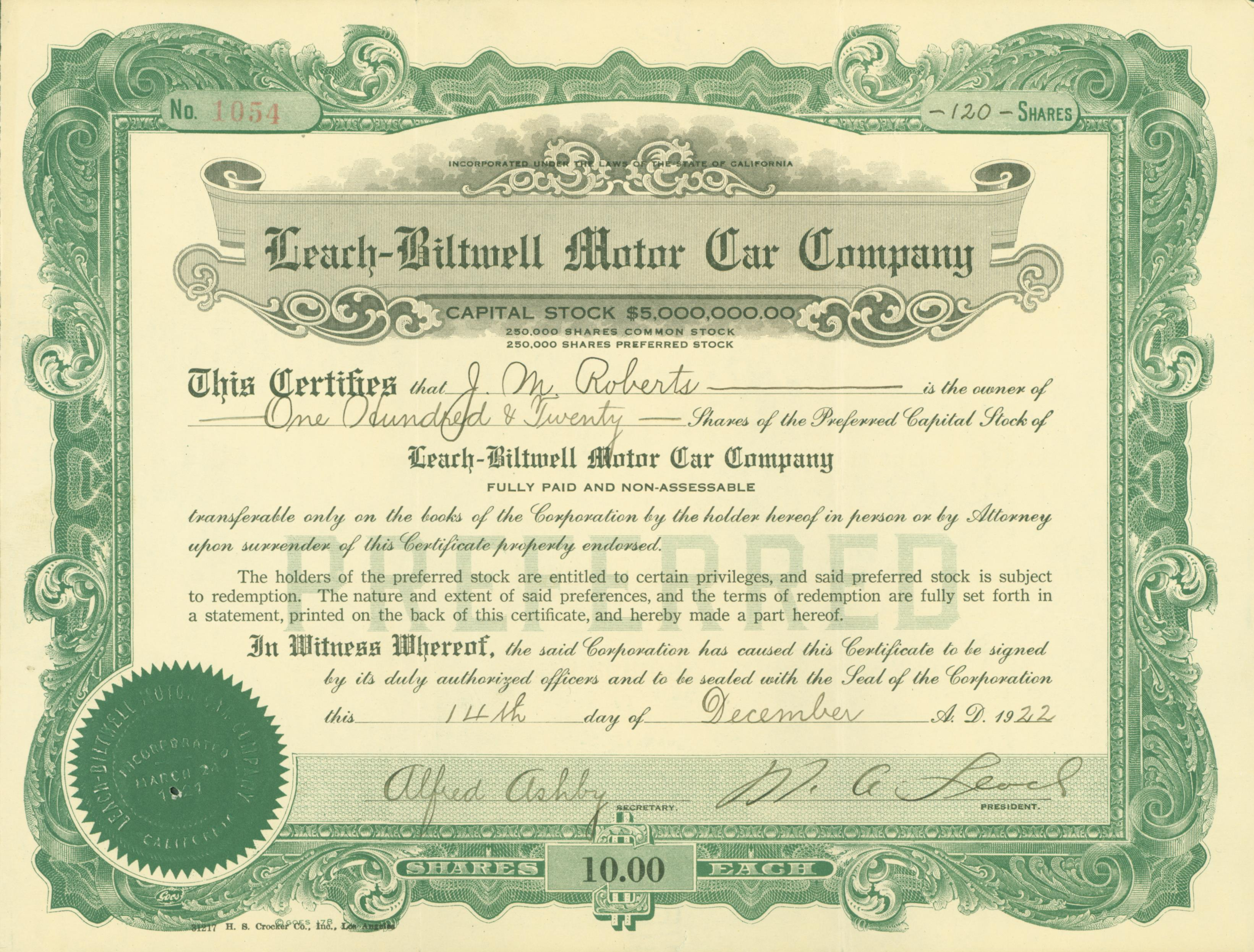
Shre of the Leach-Biltwell Motor Car Company, issued 14. December 1922

Leach-Biltwell Motor Company was a west-coast automobile manufacturer. Martin Andrew Leach of the Leach Motor Car Company formed Leach-Biltwell for automobile coachbuilding and customization. In 1919 the company was re-capitalized and began producing complete automobiles. Leach purchased the Republic Truck Company factory and began production of the Leach Power-Plus Six motorcar.

In 1922 the company again re-capitalized and expanded by purchasing the Miller Engine and Foundry works. Harry A. Miller became a vice-president of Leach-Biltwell and developed a new engine for the company. In 1923 the company was in financial trouble and introduced a smaller automobile called the California. In 1924, the company moved to a smaller factory and discontinued the Leach Power-Plus Six.

== Models ==
The Leach Power-Plus Six used a model 9N Red Seal Continental 303.1 cubic inch 60 hp inline six-cylinder engine. Touring coachwork on a 128-inch wheelbase featured two or four door body styles. Leach popularized the distinctive "California top" that was a precursor of the "hardtop" body style thirty years later. In 1922 the engine was changed to a Miller model 999 100 hp Ohc six-cylinder engine, on a 134-inch wheelbase. This technically advanced engine had teething troubles and many were replaced with Continentals.

For luxury customization, the Leach included a tilt and telescoping steering column, removable steering wheel (to be used as an anti-theft feature), a directional signal/stop light box with a dashboard switch, lighted aluminum steps instead of running boards, a one piece windshield and disc wheels with chromium rims.

The Leach was priced in 1920 from $5,200 to a high in 1922 of $6,500 (equivalent to $125,025 in 2025). From 218 to 264 cars (chassis with and without factory bodies) were produced.

== Advertising ==
Leach-Biltwell displayed a Leach at the 1920 Chicago Auto Show. Although primarily sold in California, with the slogan "The Aristocrat of Motordom", Leach advertised in major magazines to attract national attention.

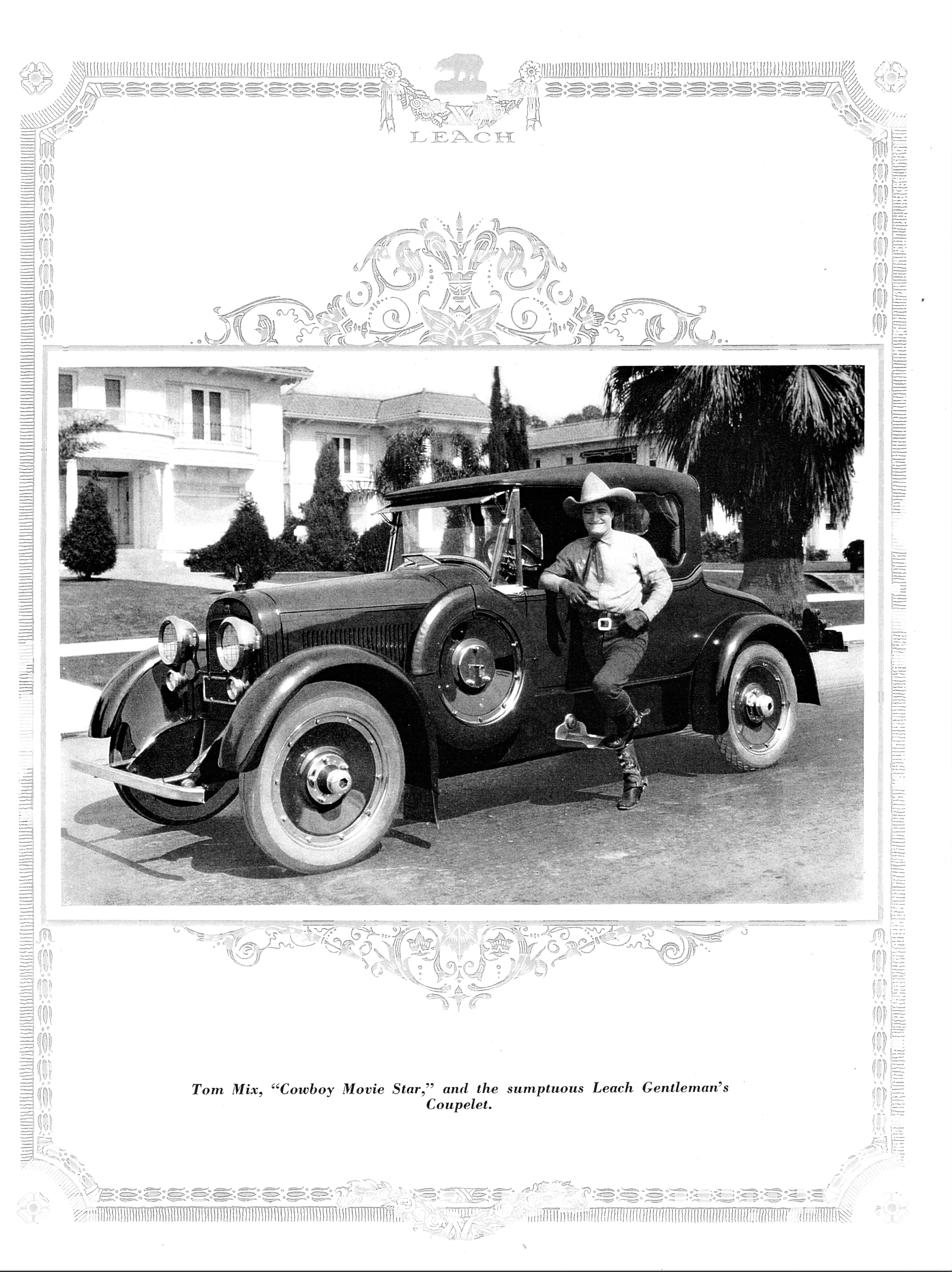
Leach-Biltwell Brochure

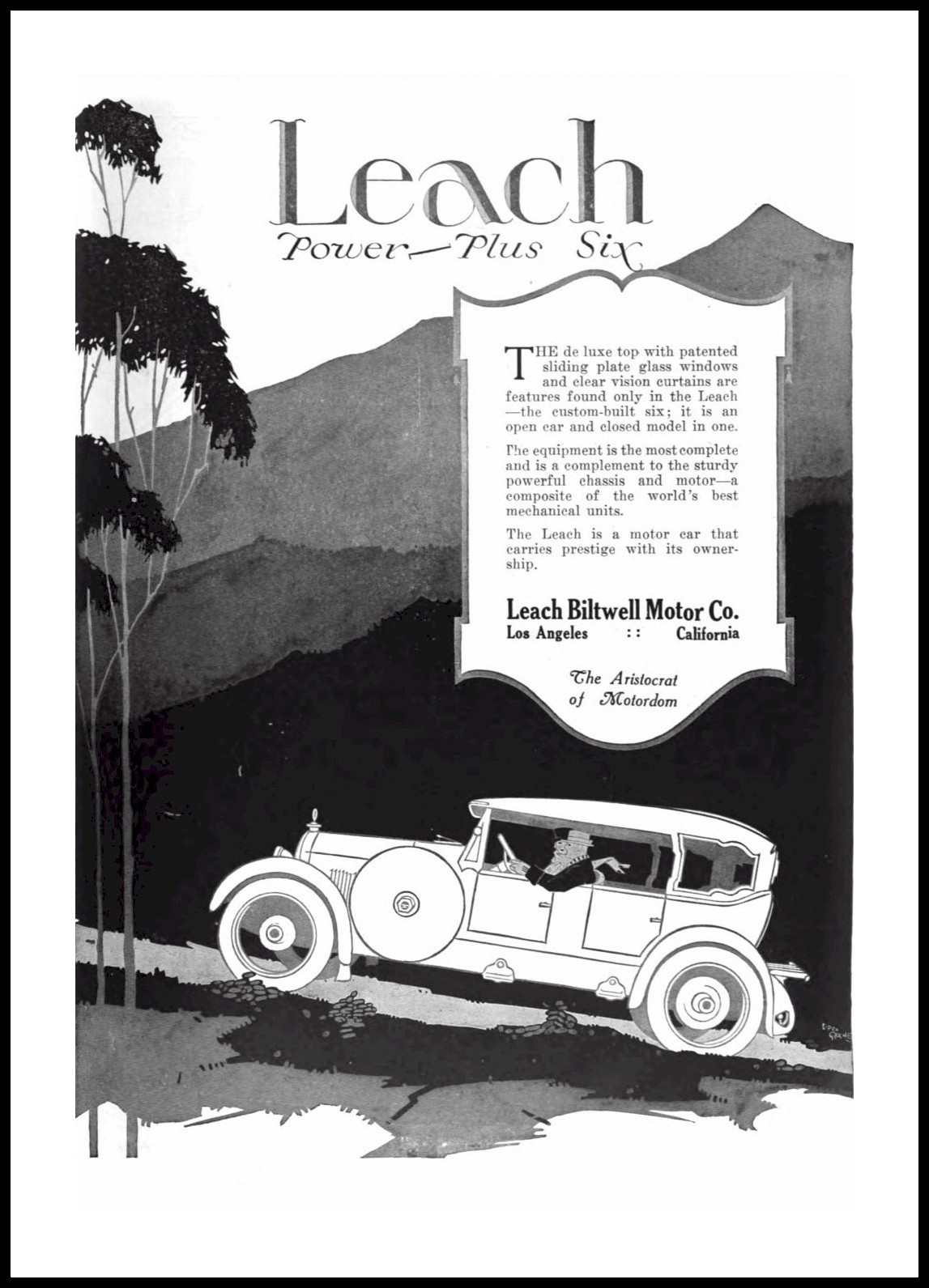
Leach Power-Plus Six Advertisement

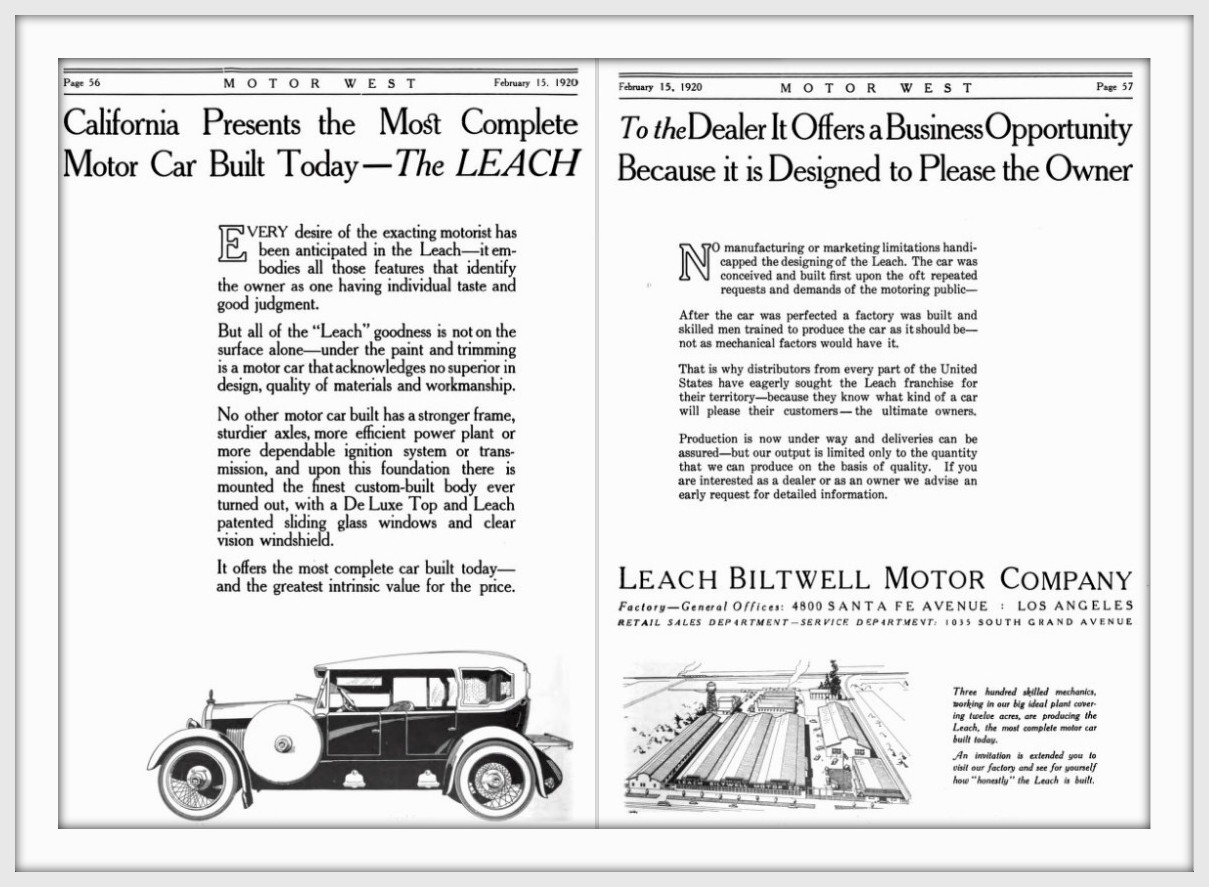
Leach two-page Advertisement
