= Eddie Miller (racing driver, born 1895) =

American racing driver (1895–1965)

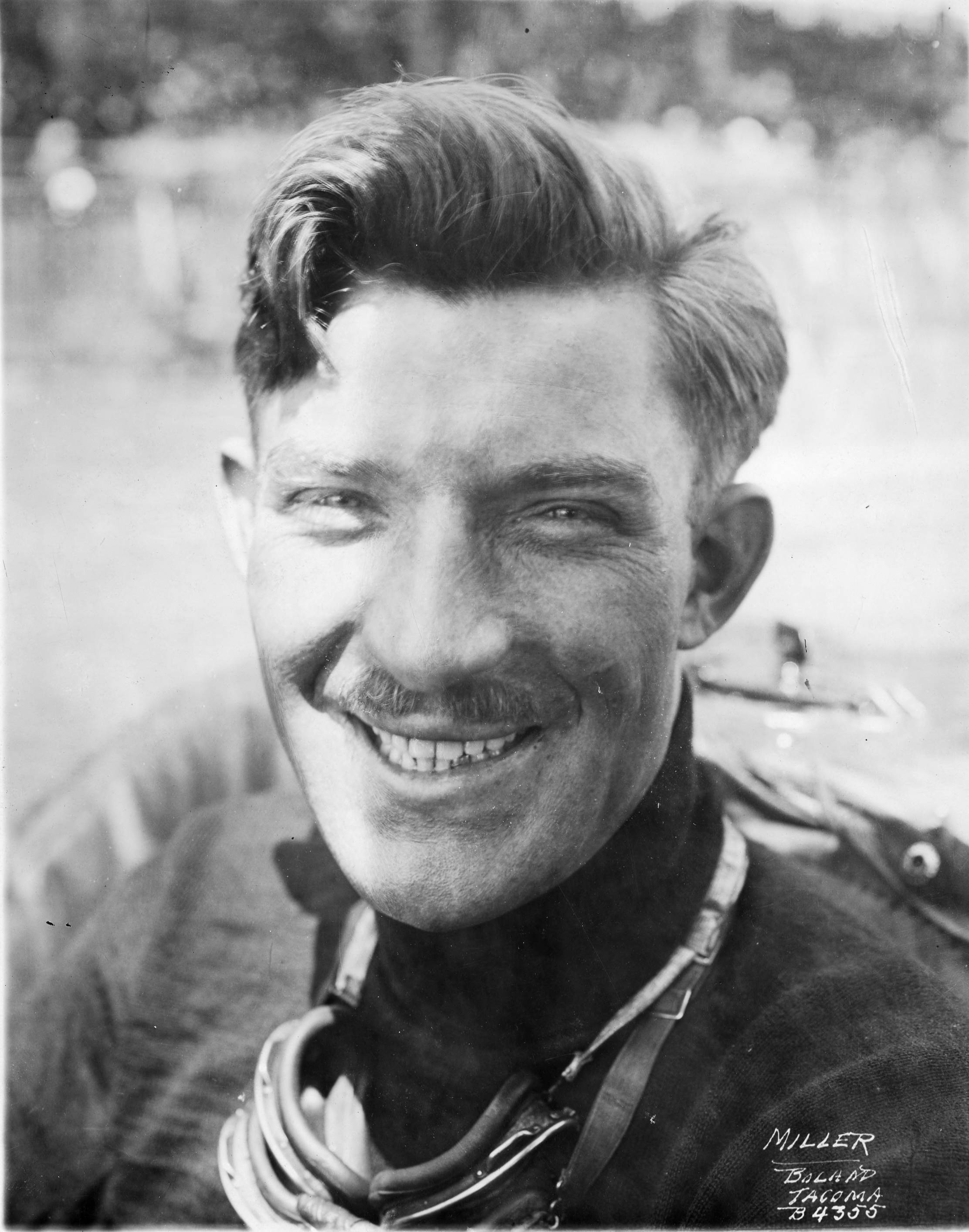
- Miller, circa 1921
- Born: Edward Miller; October 7, 1895 Dumont, New Jersey, U.S.
- Died: August 7, 1965 (aged 69) Philadelphia, Pennsylvania, U.S.

Champ Car career
- 17 races run over 4 years
- Best finish: 7th (1921)
- First race: 1920 Beverly Hills 250 #2 (Beverly Hills)
- Last race: 1922 Beverly Hills 250 #1 (Beverly Hills)
Wins	Podiums	Poles
0	3	0

Edward Miller (October 7, 1895 – August 7, 1965) was an American racing driver.

Miller was also a garage owner, and a mentor and neighbor of Stuart Hilborn and worked with Hilborn to design and build Hilborn's first hot rod to race on the Southern California dry lakes.

== Motorsports career results ==
=== Indianapolis 500 results ===
Year	Car	Start	Qual	Rank	Finish	Laps	Led	Retired
1921	5	9	83.850	20	4	200	0	Running
Totals						200	0	

Starts	1
Poles	0
Front Row	0
Wins	0
Top 5	1
Top 10	1
Retired	0
