= Jimmy Murphy (racing driver) =

American racing driver (1894–1924)

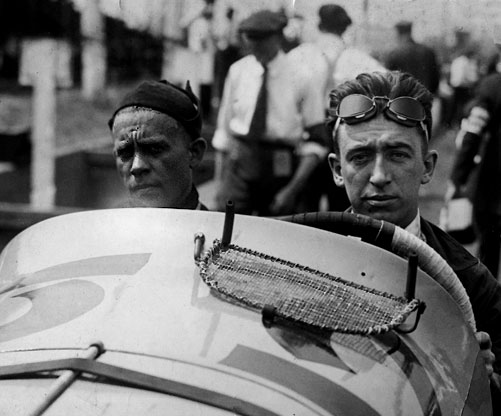
- Murphy, right, with his riding mechanic Ernie Olson in 1920
- Born: James Anthony Murphy; September 12, 1894 San Francisco, California, U.S.
- Died: September 15, 1924 (aged 30) Syracuse, New York, U.S.

Championship titles
- AAA Championship Car (1922, 1924); Major victories French Grand Prix (1921); Indianapolis 500 (1922)

Champ Car career
- 52 races run over 6 years
- Best finish: 1st (1922, 1924)
- First race: 1919 Cincinnati 250 (Sharonville)
- Last race: 1924 Syracuse 150 (Syracuse)
- First win: 1920 Beverly Hills 250 #1 (Beverly Hills)
- Last win: 1924 Fall Classic (Altoona)
Wins	Podiums	Poles
17	32	7

James Anthony Murphy (September 12, 1894 – September 15, 1924) was an American racing driver who won the 1921 French Grand Prix, the 1922 Indianapolis 500, and the American Racing Championship in 1922 and 1924.

== Background ==
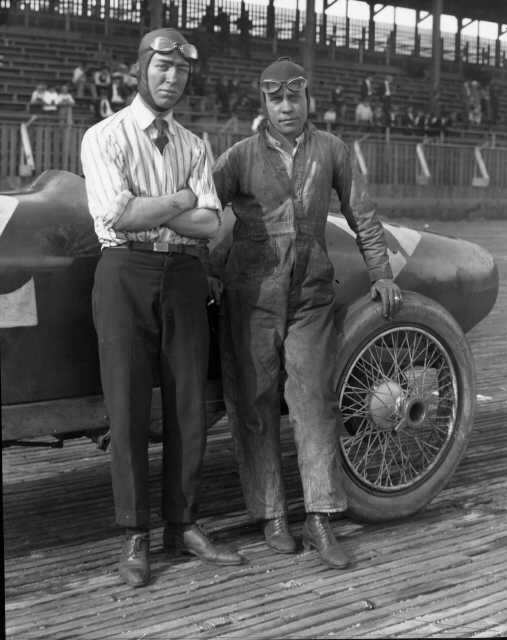
Murphy, who began his racing career as a riding mechanic, is shown here with his own mechanic at Tacoma Speedway in 1922

Murphy was born in San Francisco, California, on Minna Street, between 7th and 8th, in September 1894. His father was an immigrant from County Wexford, Ireland and his mother was an immigrant from County Mayo, Ireland and owned a fuel and feed store which fronted on Mission Street behind the family home on Minna. This area of San Francisco was called "South of the Slot" by locals in those days, and comprised a sprawling ghetto of mostly Irish immigrants and their children who made up the majority of the local labor force.

Murphy's mother Margaret died in Needles, CA in 1897 when Jimmy was three years old. Murphy's father Mathew died in July 1906 in San Francisco, a couple of months after the 1906 San Francisco earthquake. Jimmy was then an orphan and became in the care of his paternal uncle James Murphy in San Francisco. Jimmy's first cousin was 1906 San Francisco firefighter Battalion Chief Tom J. Murphy (later to become San Francisco's assistant fire chief in 1925 and recognized as one of the pioneers of modern firefighting in San Francisco).

Murphy lived with his paternal uncle James and wife Annie in their home in San Francisco until late 1907, when Murphy's maternal aunt, Mary Moran and her husband, Judge Martin O'Donnell of Vernon, California, sent for Jimmy to come live with them.

In Southern California, Murphy attended Huntington Park High School and commuted to and from school on a motorcycle given him by Judge O'Donnell. He became an expert rider and mechanic and, a few months short of graduation, opened a garage with a friend, developing a clientele of motorcycle and automobile owners from the Los Angeles area.

== Riding mechanic ==
Murphy began his racing career as a riding mechanic, back in the days when racing cars carried a driver and a "mechanician." He rode in winning driver Eddie O'Donnell's Duesenberg at the 1916 Corona road race, their car achieving an average speed of 85 miles per hour (137 km/h), a truly terrifying speed for those early days.

Murphy rode with some of America's greatest drivers of the time, including Ralph DePalma, Harry Hartz, Eddie Rickenbacker, Peter DePaolo and Tommy Milton.

== Racing career ==
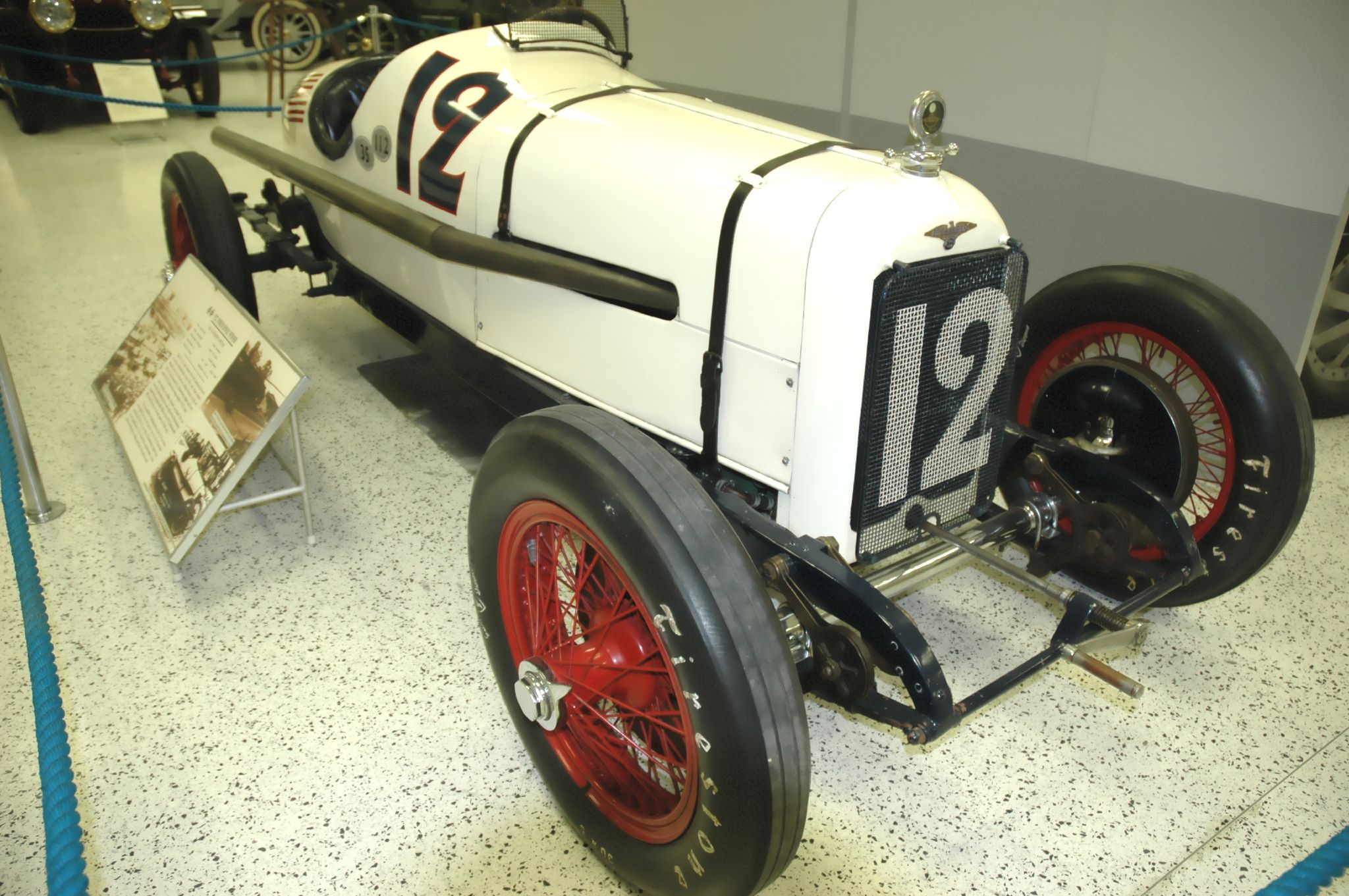
1922 Indianapolis 500 and 1921 French Grand Prix winning car

After the war, Murphy's career as a driver was spotted, but he showed promise to those who knew "the racing game." Through the influence of Duesenberg's Number One driver, Tommy Milton, Murphy was given a factory car to drive in the inaugural race at the Beverly Hills Speedway, a superfast, 1.125-mile (1.811 km) high banked, wooden speedway. To everyone (except Milton's) surprise, Murphy won that February 14, 1920 race. He went on to win regularly and became a popular champion on the circuit.

In 1921, as part of a team of Duesenbergs sponsored by French immigrant Albert Champion, he became the only American to have won a Grand Prix race in an all-American car, by winning the French Grand Prix at Le Mans. The next time an American driver would win a Grand Prix in an American-built car would be 46 years later, when Dan Gurney won the 1967 Belgian Grand Prix.

Murphy's mechanic in that race was none other than Ernie Olsen who also rode with Murphy in the 1922 Indianapolis 500. Murphy's victory was not a hollow one as he was facing the best teams from England (Sunbeam) with young gun Henry Segrave driving a 1921 Grand Prix car and France (Ballot) led by the experienced Jean Chassagne.

In 1922, Murphy won the Indianapolis 500, in the Le Mans winning car, which had been modified for the Indy race and was powered by a Miller engine. He also became National Champion that year. Murphy won the final Universal Trophy Cup Race, beating Milton, at both Tacoma Speedway and the Uniontown Speedway board track in 1922.

In 1923, Murphy placed second in the National Championship, even missing several races to go to Europe and race for Los Angeles race car builder, Harry Miller. He placed third in the Italian Grand Prix at Monza that year, in a race whose grand marshal was Benito Mussolini. Mussolini gave him two German Shepherd dogs as Murphy loved dogs.

Murphy's success continued in 1924. Murphy finished third in the Indy 500, and by the last weeks of the season, he had accumulated an unbeatable lead in the points toward the Championship.

== Death ==
Although not an accomplished dirt racer, Murphy agreed to appear at a race promoted by a friend, at the Syracuse, New York fairgrounds dirt track on September 15, 1924. As he charged for the lead late in the race on lap 138 of 150, his car slid sideways, possibly hitting oil or a part failure causing it, and crashed through the inside wooden rail. A large piece of the rail was pushed through Murphy’s chest, impaling him and killing him instantly.

Murphy was buried at Calvary Cemetery in East Los Angeles, in the O'Donnell family plot. His death made headlines across the country. His funeral was attended by most of the great drivers and racing entrepreneurs, engineers and promoters of the time. In a precedent-setting move, the American Automobile Association's Competition Board awarded the 1924 National Championship posthumously, to Murphy. At the funeral, Fred J. Wagner, Chief Starter for the AAA's Contest Board, said in his eulogy,

Sportsmanship, like every other moral quality is not instinctive. It must be acquired. Jimmy Murphy, as no other, possessed the quality of a 100% sportsman. Invariably, when he won, he attributed his success to the goddess of fortune. He carried his honors more blithely than any other man I have ever come in contact with in my 30 years as an official. He accepted victory without a sneer or a strut, and defeat without a whimper. He was one in a million.

== Awards and honors ==
Murphy has been inducted into the following halls of fame:

- Auto Racing Hall of Fame (1964)
- Motorsports Hall of Fame of America (1998)

== Motorsports career results ==
=== Indianapolis 500 results ===
Year	Car	Start	Qual	Rank	Finish	Laps	Led	Retired
1920	12	15	88.700	13	4	200	0	Running
1921	24	19	93.600	9	14	107	0	Crash T4
1922	35	1	100.500	1	1	200	153	Running
1923	5	9	104.050	2	3	200	11	Running
1924	2	1	108.030	1	3	200	56	Running
Totals						907	220	

Starts	5
Poles	2
Front Row	2
Wins	1
Top 5	4
Top 10	4
Retired	1

Preceded by Tommy Milton	Indianapolis 500 Winner; 1922	Succeeded by Tommy Milton
