= Tommy Milton =

American racing driver (1893–1962)

- Milton, circa 1919
- Born: Thomas Willard Milton; November 14, 1893 St. Paul, Minnesota, U.S.
- Died: July 10, 1962 (aged 68) Mount Clemens, Michigan, U.S.

Championship titles
- AAA Championship Car (1921); Major victories Indianapolis 500 (1921, 1923)

Champ Car career
- 102 races run over 12 years
- Best finish: 1st (1921)
- First race: 1916 Des Moines 150 (Des Moines)
- Last race: 1927 Indianapolis 500 (Indianapolis)
- First win: 1917 25-mile Race (Narragansett Park)
- Last win: 1925 Charlotte 250 (Charlotte)
Wins	Podiums	Poles
20	50	5

Thomas Willard Milton (November 14, 1893 – July 10, 1962) was an American racing driver best known as the first two-time winner of the Indianapolis 500. In spite of having only one functional eye, Milton came to be known as one of the finest racers of his generation.

== Early life ==
Milton was born in St. Paul, Minnesota, on November 14, 1893.

== Racing career ==
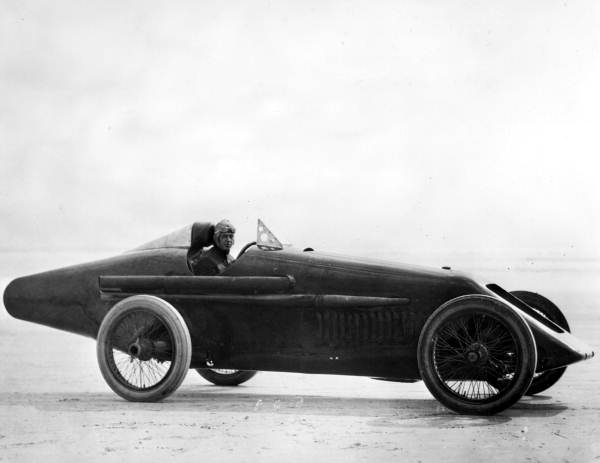
Milton in his race car at the Daytona Beach Road Course in 1920

Milton began his career in racing in 1914, competing on dirt tracks in the Midwestern United States. By 1917, he was competing nationwide, and earned his first major win at a track in Providence, Rhode Island. In 1919, he was one of the dominant figures in American racing, winning five of the nine championship races including the Elgin National Road Races, the International Sweepstakes at Sheepshead Bay, New York, and made his debut at the Indianapolis 500. Later that year, he suffered severe burns when his car burst into flames during a race at Uniontown, Pennsylvania. He returned to the track the following year to win the Universal Trophy on June 19. In 1921, Milton won the United States National Driving Championship, often referred to as the Champ Car series.

=== Record at the Indianapolis 500 ===
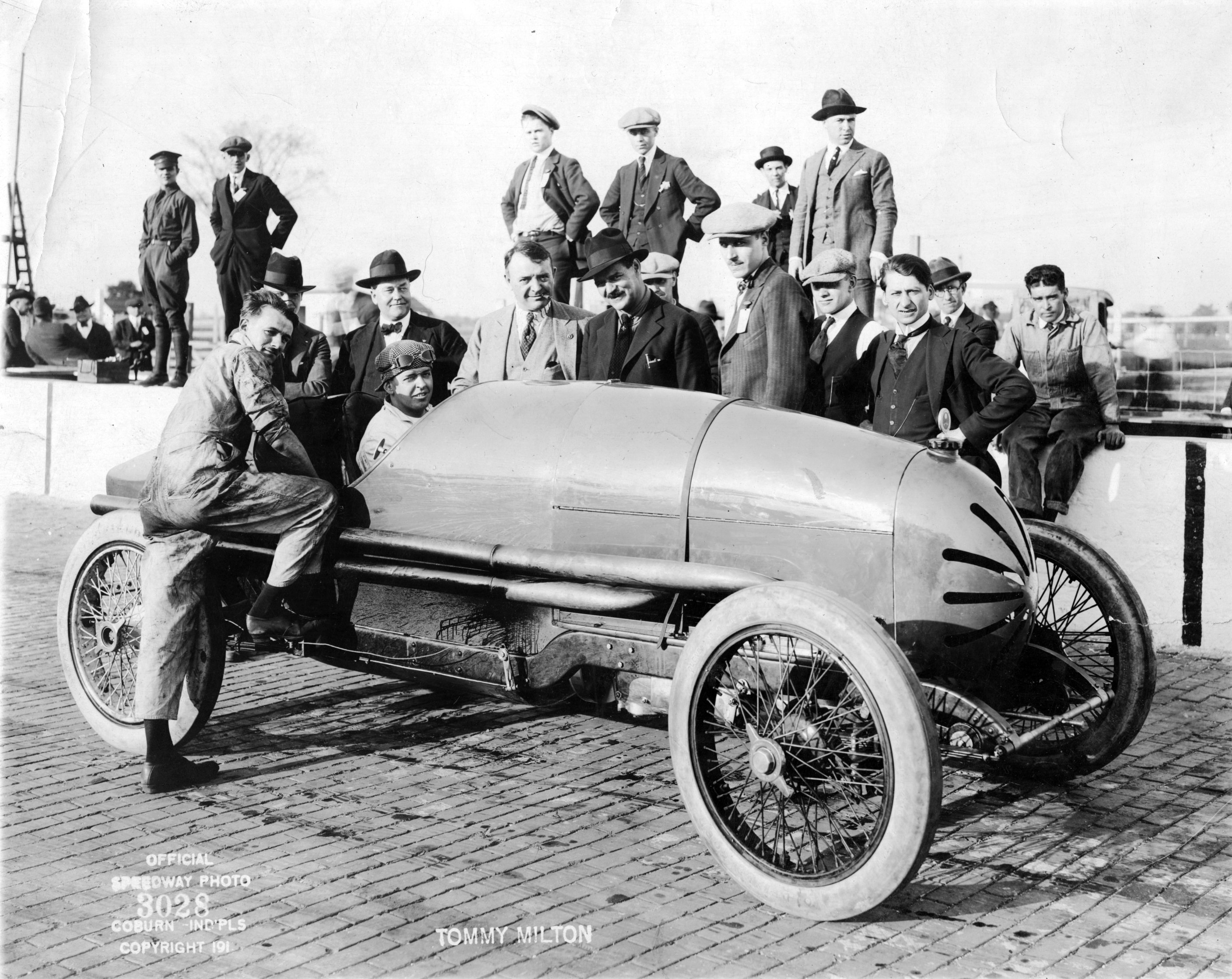
Milton with Barney Oldfield and Louis Chevrolet before the 1921 Indianapolis 500

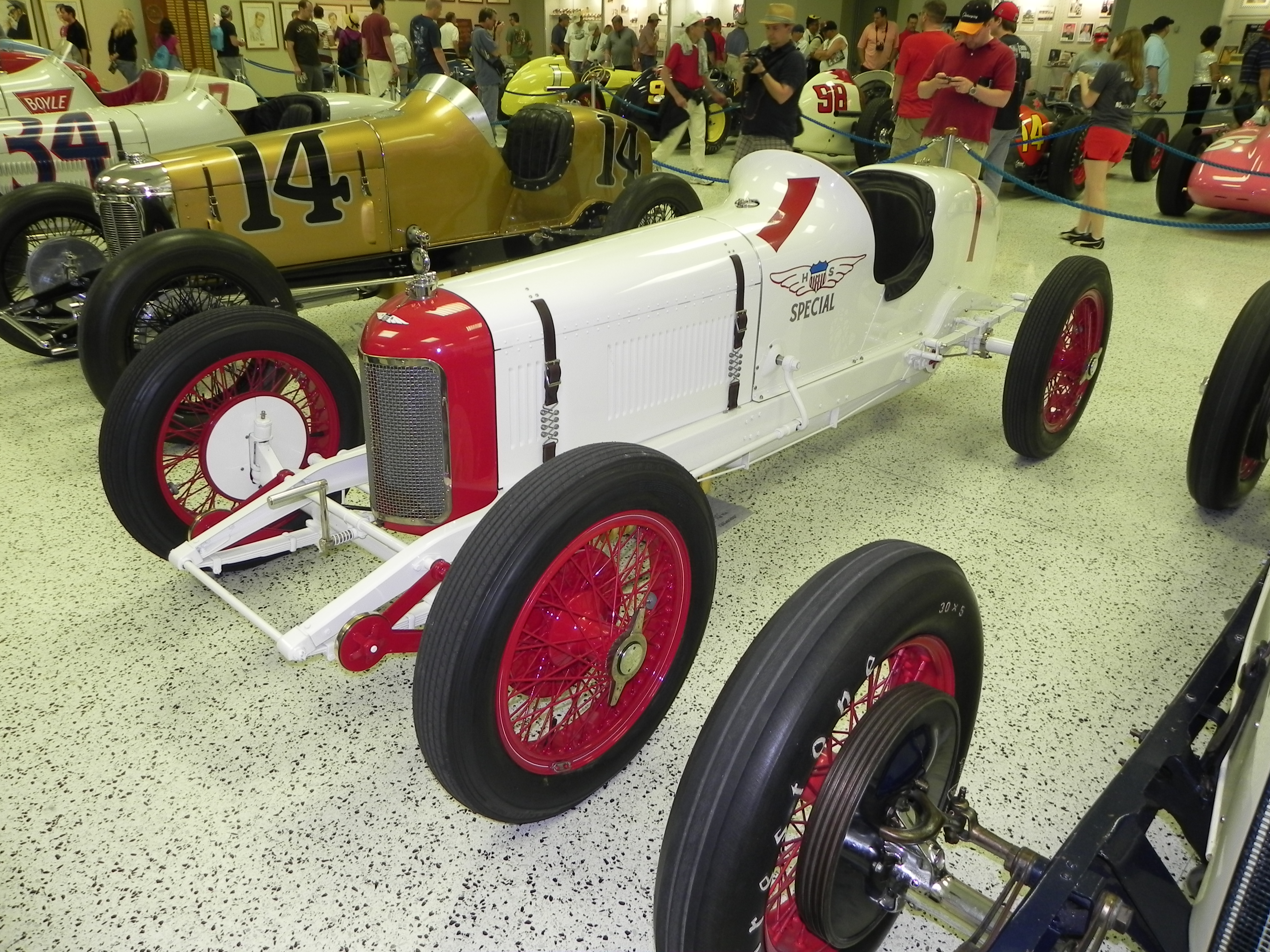
Milton's winning car from the 1923 Indianapolis 500

Milton was a starter in the Indianapolis 500 eight times, earning the pole position once, and finishing in the top five on four occasions. He drove for Duesenberg his first time in 1919 and again the following year when he finished third. In 1921, the twenty-seven-year-old Milton won the celebrated race driving a straight-eight Frontenac built by Louis Chevrolet. In 1922, fuel tank problems forced Milton out of the race after only forty-four laps, but he came back in 1923 driving for the H.C.S. Motor Co. with a Miller 122 and won the race for the second time. His last was the 1927 Indianapolis 500 where he finished eighth.

== Post-racing career ==
During the 1936 race, Milton returned to the Indianapolis Motor Speedway to drive the Packard 120 Pace Car. At his suggestion, the tradition of giving the race winner the Pace Car began that year. In 1949, Milton was appointed chief steward for the Indianapolis 500. Health problems forced him to retire in 1957.

== Death ==
Milton died in 1962 in Mount Clemens, Michigan, at the age of 68 of self-inflicted gunshot wounds.

== Awards and honors ==
Milton has been inducted into the following halls of fame:

- Auto Racing Hall of Fame (1954)
- Minnesota Sports Hall of Fame (1958)
- National Sprint Car Hall of Fame (1992)
- Motorsports Hall of Fame of America (1998)

== Motorsports career results ==
=== Indianapolis 500 results ===
Year	Car	Start	Qual	Rank	Finish	Laps	Led	Retired
1919	9	31	89.900	31	25	50	0	Rod
1920	10	11	90.200	11	3	200	0	Running
1921	2	20	93.050	11	1	200	90	Running
1922	8	24	94.400	15	24	44	0	Gas tank
1923	1	1	108.170	1	1	200	128	Running
1924	5	3	105.200	3	21	110	0	Gas tank
1925	4	11	104.366	13	5	200	0	Running
1927	6	25	108.758	20	8	200	0	Running
Totals						1204	218	

Starts	8
Poles	1
Front Row	2
Wins	2
Top 5	4
Top 10	5
Retired	3

Preceded by Gaston Chevrolet	Indianapolis 500 Winner; 1921	Succeeded by Jimmy Murphy
Preceded by Jimmy Murphy	Indianapolis 500 Winner; 1923	Succeeded by Joe Boyer; L. L. Corum
