= 1919 Grand Prix season =

Grand Prix season

Seasons
- ← 1916 1920 →

The 1919 Grand Prix season was the first season following the armistice that ended World War I in November 1918. European economies were struggling, and many automotive firms had to recover and retool from military production. So, there was very little racing activity as it took time for the companies and populations to recover. As the world rebuilt there were only two major races held in the year – the Indianapolis 500 and the Targa Florio.

Unsurprisingly there was a mixture of old and new in the fields and in both events, it was the pre-war machinery that was triumphant. In the Indianapolis race, Howdy Wilcox in his Peugeot saw off a competitive field including new cars from Duesenberg, Miller and Ballot. It also had the first postwar deaths at the event when Arthur Thurman, and then Louis LeCocq and his mechanic were killed in separate accidents. Wilcox went on to be awarded the year's AAA national championship.

The Targa Florio attracted a solid field but was held in November in atrocious weather. Raced on a shorter variant of the Madonie circuit, it became a contest between the new Ballot of René Thomas and the pre-war Peugeot voiturette of André Boillot (both of whom had been at Indianapolis). On the tight course and with the bad weather, the power advantage of the bigger cars was negated, and it was Boillot who got the victory after a gruelling eight hours in wind, rain and snow.

== Major races ==
| Date | Name | Circuit | Race Regulations | Race Distance | Winner's Time | Winning driver | Winning constructor | Report |
|---|---|---|---|---|---|---|---|---|
| 31 May | (United States) VII Indianapolis 500 | Indianapolis | AAA | 500 miles | 5h 41m | (United States) Howdy Wilcox | Peugeot EX-5 | Report |
| 23 Nov | (Italy) X Targa Florio | Medio Madonie | Targa Florio | 430 km | 7h 51m | (France) André Boillot | Peugeot L-25 | Report |

== Regulations and technical ==
The Indianapolis regulations remained the same as they were before the war – with a maximum engine size of 300 cu in (4.92 litres). The organisers of the Targa Florio had seven categories subdivided by number of cylinders and engine bore.

An inevitable surge in technology during wartime was carried over into automotive engineering design. The rapid advances in airplane engines could be translated into racing engines. Ettore Bugatti had taken Ernest Henry from Peugeot to help with the development of his Bugatti U-16 engine, with twin 8-cylinder blocks. This project was then picked up by Fred Duesenberg’s company which used new, lightweight carburettors made by Harry Miller on his innovative straight-8 engine.

Advances in metallurgy allowed lighter engines to be built, which meant they could be run at higher revolutions thereby generating more power. So, engines could be smaller and thus give a lower centre-of-gravity, which in turn meant better road-handling. Chain drives were abandoned in favour of shaft and virtually all racing units had twin-camshafts. Similarly, the long-stroke large-capacity four-cylinder pre-war engines disappeared.

The Frontenacs of Gaston and Louis Chevrolet utilised a significant amount of aluminium that made them far lighter (1600 lbs) than most other cars, that were well over 2000 pounds.

| Manufacturer | Model | Engine | Power Output | Max. Speed (km/h) | Dry Weight (kg) |
|---|---|---|---|---|---|
| (France) Peugeot | EX-5 | Peugeot 4.5L S4 | 112 bhp | 185 | 1060 |
| (France) Ballot | 5-Litre | Ballot 4.8L S8 | 140 bhp | 190 | 1245 |
| (Italy) FIAT | S57/14B | FIAT 4.5L S4 | 135 bhp | 145 | 1025 |
| (United States) Duesenberg | | Duesenberg 4.9L S8 | 120 bhp | 180 | 1150 |
| (United States) Miller | | Miller 3.0L S4 | 118 bhp | 185 | 970 |

== Season review ==
see also 1919 AAA Championship Car season

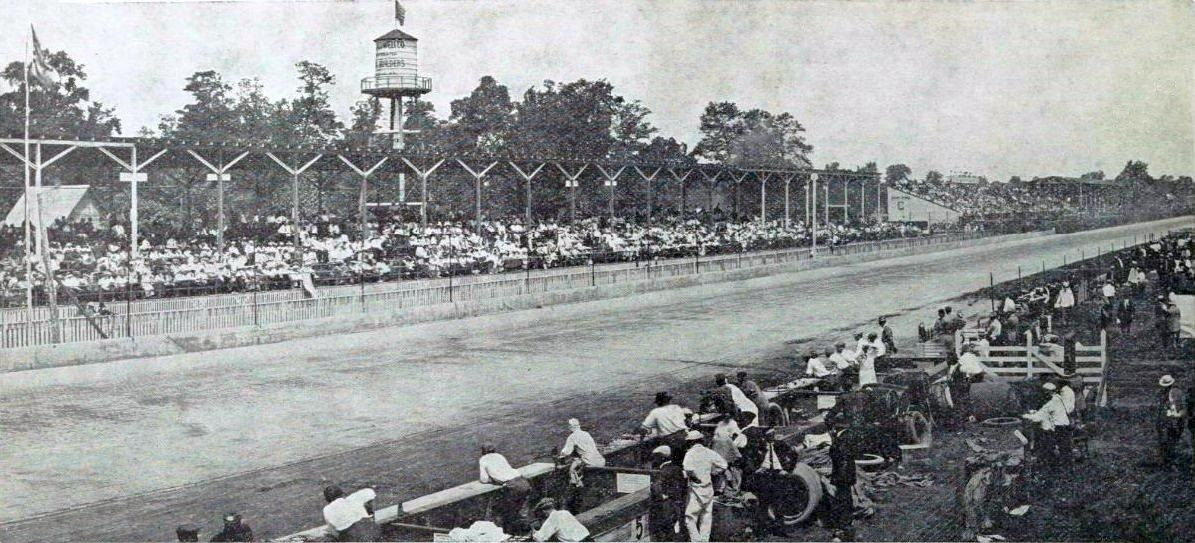
Main straight at Indianapolis, 1919

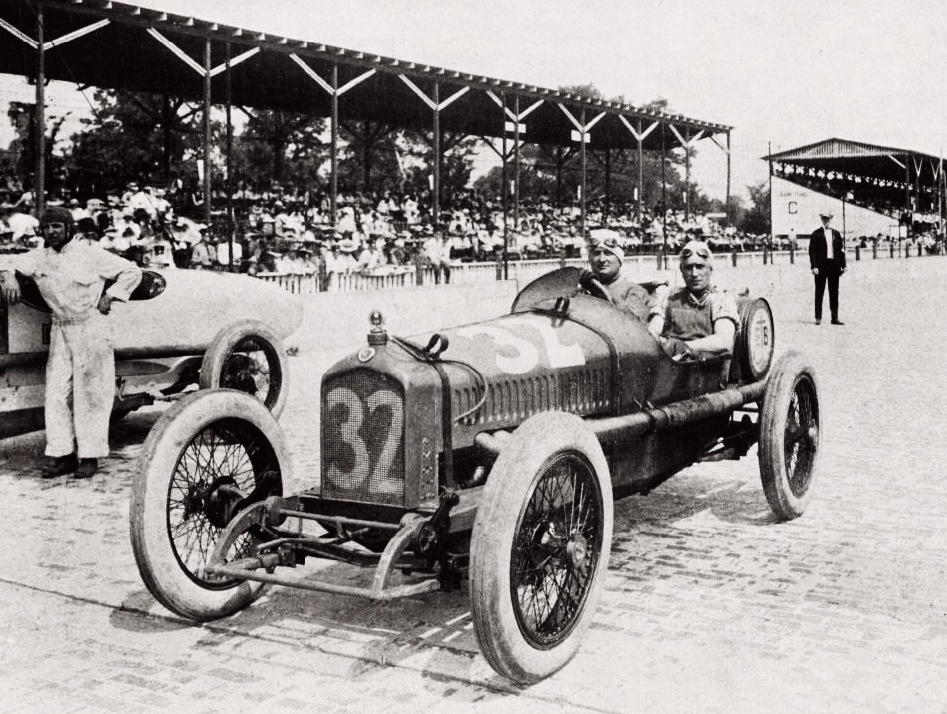
Albert Guyot, Ballot – Indianapolis 1919

During wartime, the AAA National Championship was still held in an abbreviated format. There were now no more road-races included in the event list. The points-system devised for the 1916 season was discontinued. In 1917, from 22 races (none longer than 250 miles) at 8 venues, Earl Cooper won his third championship. In 1918 there were 12 races at 4 circuits it was Ralph Mulford who won his second championship. These were retroactively calculated in 1927.

Soon after the Armistice Carl Fisher got organising the next 500-mile race at Indianapolis – to be called the “Liberty 500 Mile Sweepstakes”. He contacted Frenchman René Thomas, winner of the 1913 race, to come and add international interest. Thomas in turn approached Ballot, with Ernest Henry, to build a new car, from scratch, within a hundred days.

A full field of 36 cars was entered to qualify for the 33 starting spots. Of necessity, there was a broad mixture of new and pre-war cars. Four new Ballots arrived with their veteran drivers René Thomas, Jules Goux, Louis Wagner and Paul Bablot. Three Duesenbergs with the new straight-8 engine were entered but only Tommy Milton’s was ready in time to qualify. They also had 4-cylinder works cars for Eddie O'Donnell and Wilbur D'Alene and four privateer entries. Four of the Chevrolet brothers’ new Frontenacs arrived for themselves as well as reigning champion Mulford and Joe Boyer. There were two private entries of new 4-cylinder Millers and former winner Ralph DePalma was driving a V-12 Packard 299. British team Sunbeam had cars for Briton Dario Resta and Frenchman Jean Chassagne but officials disqualified the team for having over-size engines. This left the reigning race-winner without a drive.

The Peugeot EX5s from the pre-war races were still competitive and two were entered by the Indianapolis Motor Speedway team for Howdy Wilcox and French former winner Jules Goux. There was also an L25 voiturette driven by André Boillot, younger brother of former French racing hero Georges Boillot. Finally, three Stutzes were entered as Durant Specials for Cliff Durant, Earl Cooper and Eddie Hearne for the Chevrolet company.

The new Ballots were soon found to be over-geared, creating chronic tyre-wear on the brick surface. With no time to replace the engines, the only solution was to replace the Rudge-Whitworth wheels with smaller American wheels and tyres. This was the final time that a single timed lap would be used to judge qualification, with a minimum 80 mph needed (a 1:52.5 lap). Thomas got the fastest time with his Ballot on the first day of qualification to take pole position, ahead of Wilcox (Peugeot) and Guyot (Ballot), while Goux needed an engine change and was lucky to qualify his Peugeot with the last run of the day on Thursday.

At the start it was DePalma who stormed into the lead from Gaston Chevrolet and Wilcox. Then after 60 laps DePalma fell back with engine issues. When Chevrolet had tyre problems soon after, his brother Louis took over the lead. There were two terrible accidents mid-race. On lap 45, Arthur Thurman lost control of his Duesenberg at turn 3, smashed into the wall and rolled. Thurman was killed and his mechanic critically injured. Then on lap 97 Louis LeCocq crashed. The car rolled and burst into flame. Trapped underneath he and his mechanic, Robert Bandini, were killed.

Wilcox took the lead at two-thirds’ distance. The vaunted Ballot challenge did not eventuate: Thomas’ tyres were torn up on the bricks, Wagner lost a wheel and Goux retired from exhaustion. Bablot became ill and was relieved by Chassagne (whose Sunbeam was scratched) who then crashed the car. In the end, it was a triumph for the pre-war cars: Wilcox won by a comfortable four minutes from Hearne in the Durant-Stutz and Jules Goux in the Peugeot third.

From only two starts – a win at Indianapolis and second at the Sheepshead Bay Derby, Wilcox scored enough points to subsequently be awarded the AAA championship narrowly from Eddie Hearn (who had four second places and a third).

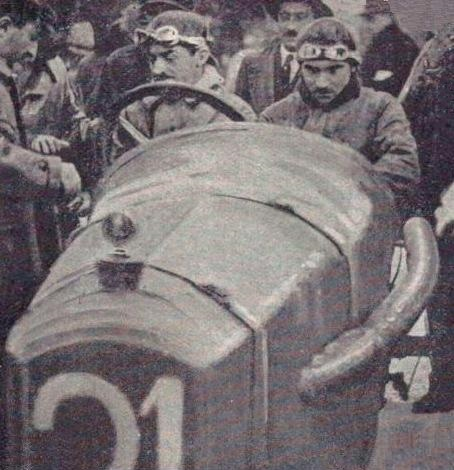
André Boillot, winner of the Targa Florio

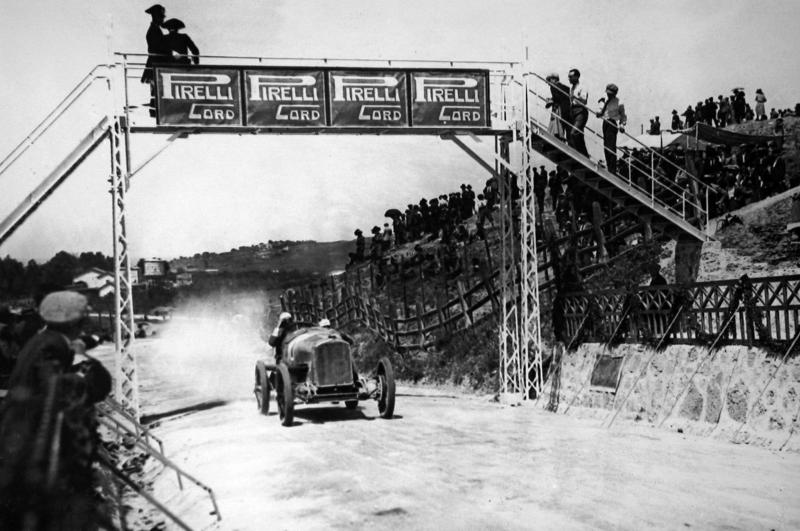
Diatto of Domenico Gamboni, 3rd in the Targa Florio

One of the first motor-race events in Europe after the war was a series of speed trials in August on the beach of Fanø island on the west coast of Denmark. By late in the year Conde Vincenzo Florio was able to use his reputation to assemble a reasonable field of twenty-four cars to his Targa Florio, the first major race in post-war Europe. Again, it was a mix of old and new cars.

In 1915 Nicola Romeo got a majority shareholding in ALFA and merged it three years later into his group of engineering companies. The Alfa Romeo 40/60 had veteran Giuseppe Campari and Nino Franchini as drivers. Among the four FIATs was Antonio Ascari in his first season of racing. There were also entries from race-regulars Itala, Diatto, Aquila Italiana and Nazzaro. New entry CMN had two cars for their drivers, Ugo Sivocci and a 21-year old Enzo Ferrari, who had already driven their cars from the factory in Milan. Foreign interest was generated with the entry of René Thomas in his Ballot and André Boillot in the Peugeot L25, both now back from Indianapolis. Finally, there was the new British firm Eric-Campbell, with cars for 1912 Targa winner Cyril Snipe and Jack Scales.

Four years of neglect through wartime had left the roads in a terrible state so a new, shortened circuit was used this year. The medio Madonie was 108 km long still started at Cerda but cut across from Castellana to Collesano to avoid the worst of the mountain roads. This was not helped by the atrocious weather on the day of the race, with the cars starting amidst high winds and snow. Thomas was leading at the end of the first of four laps. Ascari slid off down a ravine. Franchini retired his Alfa Romeo, stung by the frozen mud thrown up at him, and thereafter the Alfa cars were fitted with mudguards. Boillot went off the road half a dozen times in his efforts to keep up. Going into the last lap, Thomas stopped to refuel where his crew alerted him of the fast-approaching Peugeot. Meanwhile, Boillot's mechanic instead grabbed a tank of fuel and filled up on the run. The smaller Peugeot had a seven-minute lead and in his rush to catch up, Thomas went off the road, breaking the Ballot's axle.

Oblivious to the extent of his lead, Boillot kept pushing right to the end. Coming up to the finish-line the crowd surged onto the road to greet him. Fearful of a terrible accident at speed, Boillot slewed the car round in avoidance, injuring three spectators and hitting the palisade in front of the grandstand. The rest of the crowd tried to push the car back onto the road until a journalist warned he would be disqualified if they did. Dazed, and exhausted after nearly eight hours of concentration, the two did it and reversed over the line. Ernest Ballot then sportingly pointed out that reversing was also against the rules, so in a comical episode Boillot got back in the car, drove back to the incident site, turned around and drove back to the finish line to finally claim the victory.

The Italian cars were never able to keep up, with Antonio Moriondo in an Itala finishing half an hour behind in second, Domenico Gamboni's Diatto in third with only eight cars making it to the finish. Enzo Ferrari and the last two competitors, already well delayed, were held up further in Campofelice as the town square had filled with villagers to listen to a speech by the local governor, with no way through. By the time they finally reached the finish-line virtually everyone had caught the train back to Palermo and a remaining carabinieri took their finishing time.

Citations
