= 1920 AAA Championship Car season =

Auto racing season

- AAA National Circuit Championship

Season
- Races: 5
- Start date: February 28
- End date: November 25

Awards
- National champion: (United States) Gaston Chevrolet
- Indianapolis 500 winner: (United States) Gaston Chevrolet

The 1920 AAA Championship Car season consisted of 5 races, beginning in Beverly Hills, California on February 28 and concluding in Beverly Hills on November 25. The AAA National Champion and Indianapolis 500 champion was Gaston Chevrolet. The 1920 season later became a source of confusion and misinformation for historians when in 1926 the AAA published a revisionist history, naming another driver as the season's point champion.

During the final race of the season on November 25 the Beverly Hills event witnessed a tragedy, as that year's Indianapolis 500 winner and soon-to-be National Champion, Gaston Chevrolet, was killed, along with Eddie O'Donnell and his riding mechanic, Lyall Jolls.

== Official schedule and results ==
Rnd	Date	Race name	Track	Location	Type	Pole position	Winning driver
1	February 28	(United States) Beverly Hills Race 1 - 250	Los Angeles Motor Speedway	Beverly Hills, California	Board	(United States) Jimmy Murphy	(United States) Jimmy Murphy
NC	March 28	(United States) Beverly Hills Heat 1 - 50	Los Angeles Motor Speedway	Beverly Hills, California	Board	—	(United States) Art Klein
NC	March 28	(United States) Beverly Hills Heat 2 - 50	Los Angeles Motor Speedway	Beverly Hills, California	Board	—	(United States) Jimmy Murphy
NC	March 28	(United States) Beverly Hills Main - 50^{A}	Los Angeles Motor Speedway	Beverly Hills, California	Board	—	(United States) Tommy Milton
2	May 31	(United States) International 500 Mile Sweepstakes^{B}	Indianapolis Motor Speedway	Speedway, Indiana	Brick	(United States) Ralph DePalma	(United States) Gaston Chevrolet
NC	June 19	(United States) Universal Trophy Race - 225	Uniontown Speedway	Hopwood, Pennsylvania	Board	—	(United States) Tommy Milton
3	July 5	(United States) Tacoma Race - 200	Pacific Speedway	Tacoma, Washington	Board	(United States) Tommy Milton	(United States) Tommy Milton
4	August 28	(United States) Elgin National Trophy - 255^{C}	Elgin Road Race Course	Elgin, Illinois	Road	(United States) Ralph DePalma	(United States) Ralph DePalma
NC	September 6	(United States) 4th Annual Autumn Classic - 225	Uniontown Speedway	Hopwood, Pennsylvania	Board	—	(United States) Tommy Milton
NC	September 19	(United States) Syracuse Race - 50	New York State Fairgrounds	Syracuse, New York	Dirt	—	(United States) Ralph DePalma
NC	October 2	(United States) San Joaquin Valley Classic - 200	Fresno Speedway	Fresno, California	Board	(United States) Eddie O'Donnell	(United States) Jimmy Murphy
5	November 25	(United States) Beverly Hills Race 5 - 250	Los Angeles Motor Speedway	Beverly Hills, California	Board	(United States) Jimmy Murphy	(United States) Roscoe Sarles

Dirt/Brick/Board Oval
Road Course/Hill Climb
Non-championship race

^A Starters limited to first four finishers for each preliminary race
^B 183 in^{3} (3.00 L) maximum displacement.
^C Points allocated on the basis of advertised distance of 250 miles.

== Controversy over official race schedule ==
The 5 race schedule has been confirmed as the correct and historically accurate schedule for the championship season of 1920. In the race day program for the final race at Beverly Hills was the points distribution for the championship contenders over the previous four races of the season. The championship was confirmed in the weeks leading up to the race by various newspapers around the country printing the four race championship standings leading to the final race.

Confusion about the season began in 1926 when, for "comparative reasons", Contest Board member Arthur Means reworked the schedule to include 10 races and changed the champion to Tommy Milton. The earliest that the ten race standing occur are in the 27 October 1927 issue of Motor Age. In 1951 Racing Board member Russ Catlin found these retroactive crib sheets and folded the results into official AAA documentation, continuing the confusion about the 1920 season and early AAA history as a whole. The added races to the season were all of the Non-championship races of the above official schedule, excepted the two races at Uniontown Speedway.

In 1961, Al Bloemker attempted to reconcile the two different accounts for the 1920 season. He surmises that there was an issue with sanctioning fees paid by the Uniontown Speedway and their two races held that year were not included in the final season standings. The printed media of the time is silent about any issue with the Uniontown races not being championship events. They did in fact hold two races but they were not part of the championship. If Uniontown did pay for championship level racing but was not credited for them, lawsuits would have surely been filed but no such record exists.

== Official final points standings ==
Note: Drivers had to be running at the finish to score points. Points scored by drivers sharing a ride were split according to percentage of race driven. Starters were not allowed to score points as relief drivers, if a race starter finished the race in another car, in a points scoring position, those points were awarded to the driver who had started the car..
The final standings based on reference.

Pos	Driver	BEV1 (United States)	INDY (United States)	TAC (United States)	ELG (United States)	BEV2 (United States)	Pts
1	(United States) Gaston Chevrolet		1	7	8	6	1030
2	(United States) Tommy Milton	16	3	**1***	2	11	930
3	(United States) Jimmy Murphy	**1**	4	6	3	**4**	885
4	(United States) Ralph DePalma	8	**5**	11	**1**	DNQ	605
5	(United States) Roscoe Sarles	14	17	5		1*	540
6	(France) René Thomas		2				520
7	(United States) Joe Thomas	2	8	10	7	5	351
8	(United States) Ralph Mulford	7	9	2	4		350
9	(United States) Eddie Hearne	6	6	3	DNQ	3	345
10	(United States) Eddie Miller RY			DNP		2	260
11	(United States) Ira Vail	3	12				140
12	(United States) Eddie O'Donnell	5	14	8	5	7	110
13	(United States) Art Klein	13	8	4			62
14	(United States) Ken Goodson R	4					61
15	(France) Jean Chassagne		7				50
16	(United States) Tom Alley		10		7		36
17	(United States) Percy Ford				6		35
18	(Canada) Pete Henderson		10				14
19	(United States) John DePalma	9					10
20	(United States) Harry Thicksten R		8				2
-	(United States) Jim Crosby					8	0
-	(United States) Joe Boyer	11*	12*	9			0
-	(United States) Al Melcher					9	0
-	(United States) Eddie Pullen	10					0
-	(United States) John Thiele R					10	0
-	(United States) John Boling R		11				0
-	(United States) Riley Brett R		11				0
-	(United States) Cliff Durant	15	DNQ	12	Wth		0
-	(United States) Reeves Dutton	12					0
-	(United States) Aldo Franchi		13				0
-	(United States) Ray Howard		13				0
-	(France) Jules Goux		15				0
-	(United States) Willie Haupt		16				0
-	(United States) Wade Morton R		16				0
-	(United States) Bennett Hill	17	17			DNP	0
-	(United States) Jerry Wunderlich R		17				0
-	(United States) Waldo Stein	18	DNQ			DNP	0
-	(United States) Salvatore Barbarino		18				0
-	(United States) Louis Chevrolet		18				0
-	(United States) Howdy Wilcox		19				0
-	(France) Jean Porporato		22				0
-	(France) André Boillot		23				0
-	(United States) Toland Nicholson	DNQ					0
-	(United States) John White	DNQ					0
-	(United States) Arthur Chevrolet		DNQ				0
-	(United States) Jules Ellingboe		DNQ				0
-	(United States) Frank Elliott		DNQ				0
-	(United States) Kurt Hitke		DNQ				0
-	(United States) Glenn Howard		DNQ				0
-	(United Kingdom) Jack Scales		DNQ				0
-	(United States) Dave Lewis					DNQ	0
-	(United States) Alton Soules					DNQ	0
-	(United States) Stuart Wilkinson					DNQ	0
-	(United States) Tom Rooney		DNS				0
-	(United States) W. H. Seymour				DSQ		0
Pos	Driver	BEV1 (United States)	INDY (United States)	TAC (United States)	ELG (United States)	BEV2 (United States)	Pts

Color	Result
Gold	Winner
Silver	2nd place
Bronze	3rd place
Green	4th & 5th place
Light Blue	6th-10th place
Dark Blue	Finished (Outside Top 10)
Purple	Did not finish (Ret)
Red	Did not qualify (DNQ)
Brown	Withdrawn (Wth)
Black	Disqualified (DSQ)
White	Did not start (DNS)
Blank	Did not participate (DNP)
Blank	Not competing

**In-line notation**
**Bold**	Pole position
Italics	Ran fastest race lap
*	Led most race laps
Rookie of the Year
Rookie

== See also ==
- 1920 Indianapolis 500
