= Denny Hickey =

American racing driver (1890–1965)

- Born: Dennis William Hickey; May 14, 1890 Connellsville, Pennsylvania, U.S.
- Died: August 11, 1965 (aged 75) Connellsville, Pennsylvania, U.S.

Champ Car career
- 18 races run over 3 years
- First race: 1917 Autumn Classic (Uniontown)
- Last race: 1919 Cincinnati 250 (Sharonville)
Wins	Podiums	Poles
0	2	0

Dennis William Hickey (May 14, 1890 – August 11, 1965) was an American racing driver.

Hickey made 18 AAA Championship Car starts between 1917 and 1919, including the 1919 Indianapolis 500. His best race finish was third twice on the Uniontown Speedway board oval in 1919. He drove a Hudson for his entire career.

== Motorsports career results ==
=== Indianapolis 500 results ===
Year	Car	Start	Qual	Rank	Finish	Laps	Led	Retired
1919	21	27	92.500	26	9	200	0	Running
Totals						200	0	

Starts	1
Poles	0
Front Row	0
Wins	0
Top 5	0
Top 10	1
Retired	0
