= Charles Kirkpatrick =

American racing driver (1894–1975)

- Born: Charles Herbert Kirkpatrick; December 29, 1894 Lafayette, Indiana, U.S.
- Died: May 4, 1975 (aged 80) Lafayette, Indiana, U.S.

Champ Car career
- 3 races run over 2 years
- First race: 1917 Sharonville Sweepstakes (Sharonville)
- Last race: 1919 Indianapolis 500 (Indianapolis)
Wins	Podiums	Poles
0	0	0

Charles Herbert Kirkpatrick (December 29, 1894 – May 4, 1975) was an American racing driver.

== Motorsports career results ==
=== Indianapolis 500 results ===
Year	Car	Start	Qual	Rank	Finish	Laps	Led	Retired
1919	19	11	90.000	30	20	69	0	Rod
Totals						69	0	

Starts	1
Poles	0
Front Row	0
Wins	0
Top 5	0
Top 10	0
Retired	1
