= W. W. Brown =

American racing driver (1886–1958)

- Brown (right) with Tony Gulotta
- Born: William Wayne Brown; February 27, 1886 Dodge City, Kansas, U.S.
- Died: June 14, 1958 (aged 72) Kansas City, Missouri, U.S.

Champ Car career
- 10 races run over 3 years
- First race: 1915 Galesburg 100 (Galesburg)
- Last race: 1919 Indianapolis 500 (Indianapolis)
Wins	Podiums	Poles
0	0	0

William Wayne Brown (February 27, 1886 – June 14, 1958) was an American racing driver who participated in the 1919 Indianapolis 500.

== Biography ==
Brown was born on February 27, 1886, in Dodge City, Kansas.

On July 17, 1913, Brown went hillclimbing in his car, the Bear Cat, twenty miles to the summit of Pikes Peak. The ascent took 5 hours and 28 minutes.

Brown participated in the 1919 Indianapolis 500.

Brown died on June 14, 1958, in Kansas City, Missouri.

== Motorsports career results ==
=== Indianapolis 500 results ===
Year	Car	Start	Qual	Rank	Finish	Laps	Led	Retired
1919	5	17	99.800	8	32	14	0	Rod
Totals						14	0	

Starts	1
Poles	0
Front Row	0
Wins	0
Top 5	0
Top 10	0
Retired	1
