= Kurt Hitke =

American racing driver (1889–1979)

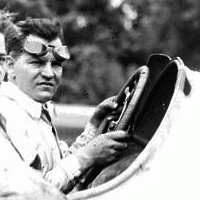
- Born: Kurt F. Hitke; December 1, 1889 Audigast, Saxony, German Empire
- Died: February 23, 1979 (aged 89) Miami, Florida, U.S.

Champ Car career
- 4 races run over 2 years
- First race: 1919 Victory Sweepstakes (Uniontown)
- Last race: 1919 Cincinnati 250 (Sharonville)
Wins	Podiums	Poles
0	1	0

Kurt F. Hitke (December 1, 1889 – February 23, 1979) was an American racing driver.

== Biography ==
Hitke was born in Audigast, a village near Groitzsch in the Kingdom of Saxony, at that time part of the German Empire. He immigrated to the United States in 1911, and by the time of the First World War had declared his intentions to obtain American citizenship. In addition to his driving abilities, Hitke was an outstanding automobile mechanic and is credited with inventing the first straight eight motor, which was later used very successfully by the Packard Motor Company and others. His interest was largely in racing automobiles and both the Roamer and the Kenilworth, which he designed, were considered outstanding during the early 1920s.

A naturalised American by the time of his racing days, Hitke later ran an insurance company in Illinois.

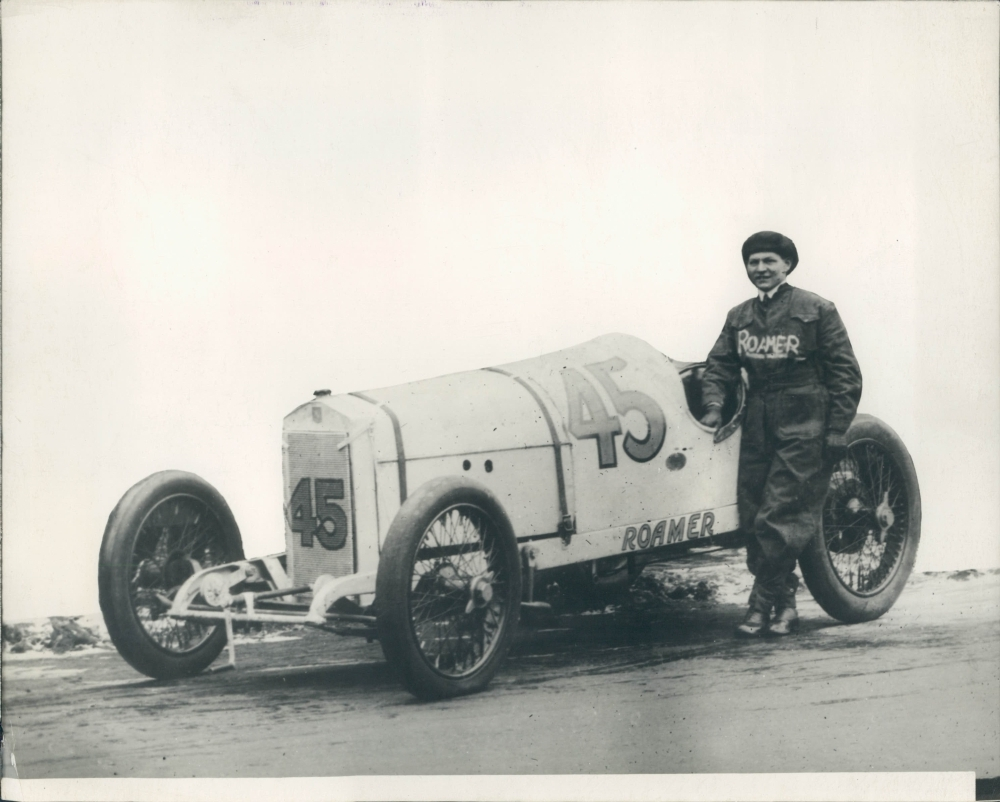

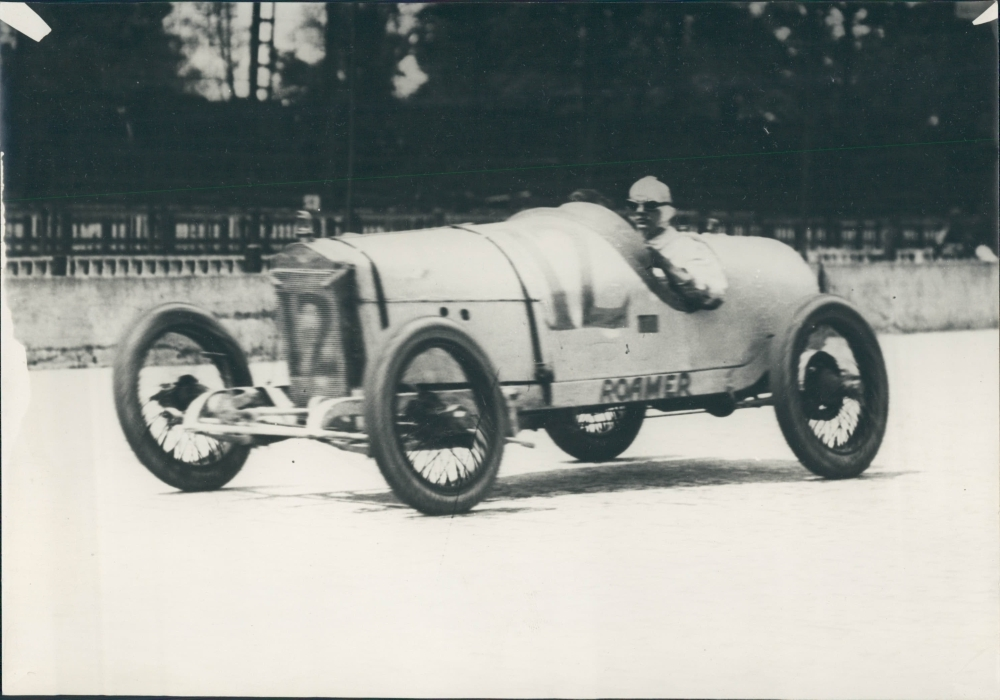

== Motorsports career results ==
=== Indianapolis 500 results ===
Year	Car	Start	Qual	Rank	Finish	Laps	Led	Retired
1919	12	24	93.500	23	23	56	0	Rod bearing
Totals						56	0	

Starts	1
Poles	0
Front Row	0
Wins	0
Top 5	0
Top 10	0
Retired	1
