= Omar Toft =

American racing driver (1886–1921)

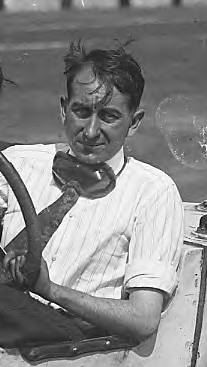
- Toft in 1916
- Born: June 30, 1886 Bourbon, Missouri, U.S.
- Died: November 12, 1921 (aged 35) Phoenix, Arizona, U.S.

Champ Car career
- 25 races run over 4 years
- Best finish: 27th (tie) (1916)
- First race: 1916 Montamarathon/Potlach; Trophy (Tacoma)
- Last race: 1919 Cincinnati 250 (Sharonville)
Wins	Podiums	Poles
0	4	0

Omar Toft (June 30, 1886 – November 12, 1921) was an American racing driver. Toft succumbed to injuries sustained in a racing accident at the Arizona State Fairgrounds.

== Motorsports career results ==
=== Indianapolis 500 results ===
Year	Car	Start	Qual	Rank	Finish	Laps	Led	Retired
1919	43	30	91.500	29	28	44	0	Rod
Totals						44	0	

Starts	1
Poles	0
Front Row	0
Wins	0
Top 5	0
Top 10	0
Retired	1
