= J. J. McCoy =

J. J. McCoy may refer to:

- J. J. McCoy (racing driver), American racing driver
- J. J. McCoy (rugby union) (born 1958), former Irish rugby union player
