= Elmer T. Shannon =

American racing driver (1892–1961)

- Born: Elmer Thomas Shannon; February 2, 1892 Ashland, Wisconsin, U.S.
- Died: February 14, 1961 (aged 69) Los Angeles, California, U.S.

Champ Car career
- 1 race run over 1 year
- First race: 1919 Indianapolis 500 (Indianapolis)
| Wins | Podiums | Poles |
|---|---|---|
| 0 | 0 | 0 |

Elmer Thomas Shannon (February 2, 1892 – February 14, 1961) was an American racing driver. The 1919 Indianapolis 500 was his only AAA Championship Car start. Although he entered a race at the Sheepshead Bay Race Track later that year his car did not arrive. He was primarily a mechanic, engineer, and car builder.

== Motorsports career results ==
=== Indianapolis 500 results ===
| Year | Car | Chassis | Engine | Start | Qual | Rank | Finish | Laps | Led | Retired |
|---|---|---|---|---|---|---|---|---|---|---|
| 1919 | 23 | Duesenberg | Shannon | 29 | 91.700 | 28 | 13 | 200 | 0 | Running |
| Totals | | | | | | | | 200 | 0 | |

| Starts | 1 |
| Poles | 0 |
| Front Row | 0 |
| Wins | 0 |
| Top 5 | 0 |
| Top 10 | 0 |
| Retired | 0 |
