= J. J. McCoy (racing driver) =

American racing driver (1886–unknown)

- Born: John Joseph McCoy; June 16, 1886 Chicago, Illinois, U.S.
- Died: unknown

Champ Car career
- 1 race run over 2 years
- First race: 1919 Indianapolis 500 (Indianapolis)
Wins	Podiums	Poles
0	0	0

John Joseph McCoy (June 16, 1886 – unknown) was an American racing driver who participated in the 1919 Indianapolis 500.

== Biography ==
McCoy, who worked in Ortonville, Minnesota, competed at the Indianapolis track once before, as a member of the Velie Motors Corporation team in the inaugural contest on the brick oval at the 1911 Indianapolis 500 without getting into the money, however. McCoy appeared with success in dirt track contests throughout the northwest, and he also competed in a couple of the events held on the Minneapolis speedway.

== Motorsports career results ==
=== Indianapolis 500 results ===
Year	Car	Start	Qual	Rank	Finish	Laps	Led	Retired
1919	36	33	86.500	33	30	36	0	Oil line
Totals						36	0	

Starts	1
Poles	0
Front Row	0
Wins	0
Top 5	0
Top 10	0
Retired	1
