= Paul Bablot =

French racing driver (1873–1932)

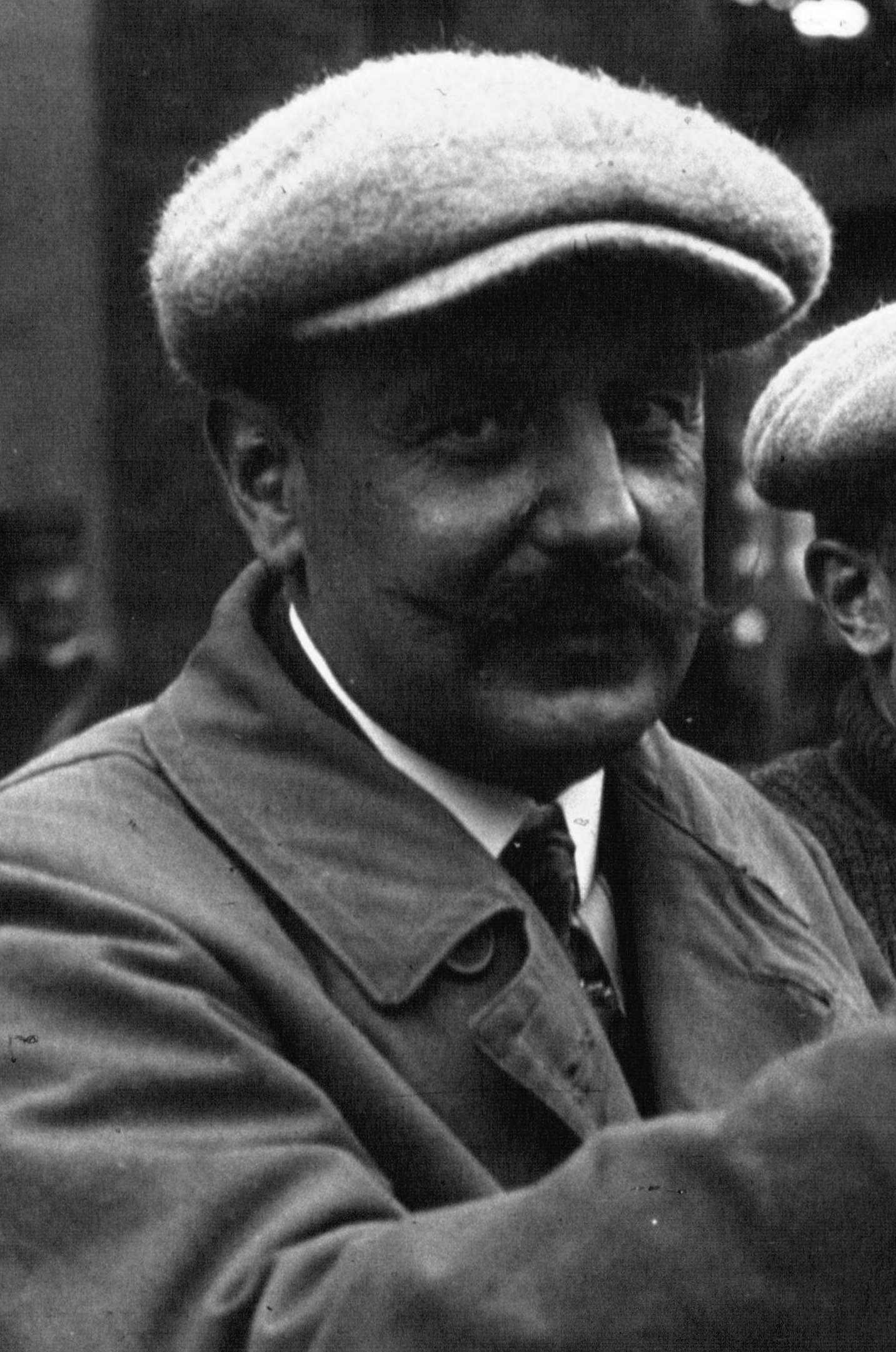
- Bablot in 1914
- Born: Paul Florian Bablot; 20 November 1873 Boulogne-sur-Seine, Seine, France
- Died: 23 December 1932 (aged 59) Marseille, Bouches-du-Rhône, France

Champ Car career
- 1 race run over 1 year
- First race: 1919 Indianapolis 500 (Indianapolis)
Wins	Podiums	Poles
0	0	0

Paul Florian Bablot (20 November 1873 – 23 December 1932) was a French racing driver. He also owned an early French-built Wright-model airplane.

Bablot later became a track builder and designed the Circuit of Miramas which held the French Grand Prix in 1926.

== Motorsports career results ==
=== Indianapolis 500 results ===
Year	Car	Start	Qual	Rank	Finish	Laps	Led	Retired
1919	33	6	94.900	17	21	63	0	Crash
Totals						63	0	

Starts	1
Poles	0
Front Row	0
Wins	0
Top 5	0
Top 10	0
Retired	1
