= 1920 Indianapolis 500 =

American motor race

8th Indianapolis 500
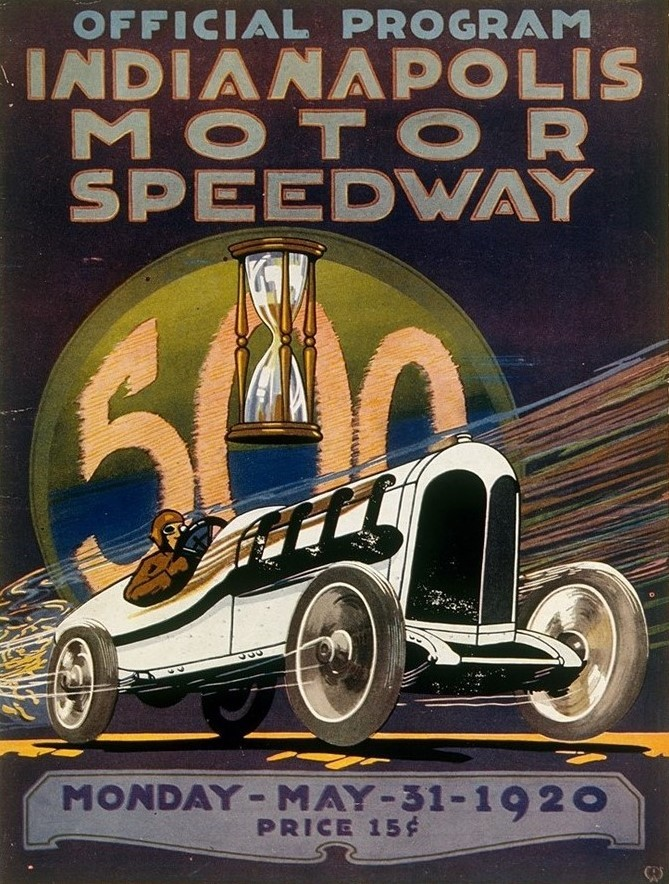

Indianapolis Motor Speedway

Indianapolis 500
- Sanctioning body: AAA
- Date: May 31, 1920
- Winner: Gaston Chevrolet
- Winning Riding Mechanic: John Bresnahan
- Winning Entrant: William Small Company
- Winning time: 5:38:32
- Average speed: 88.618 mph (142.617 km/h)
- Pole position: Ralph DePalma
- Pole speed: 99.150 mph (159.566 km/h)
- Most laps led: Joe Boyer (93)

Pre-race
- Pace car: Marmon 6 (Model 34)
- Pace car driver: Barney Oldfield
- Starter: E. C. Patterson
- Honorary referee: Clifford C. Ireland
- Estimated attendance: 120,000 (up 10k from previous year)

Chronology
Previous	Next
1919	1921

The 8th International 500-Mile Sweepstakes Race was held at the Indianapolis Motor Speedway on Monday, May 31, 1920.

Ralph DePalma held a two lap lead when the car stalled on lap 187. His riding mechanic Pete DePaolo ran to the pits to get a can of gasoline, thinking they were out of fuel. DePalma was able to get the car rolling again, and the two rejoined the race. However, during the delay, the lead went to Gaston Chevrolet. Chevrolet himself ran out of fuel on lap 197, but he was able to coast to the pits and refuel. Chevrolet held on to win. About six months later, he was fatally injured in a crash at Beverly Hills.

Chevrolet won the race without a single tire change, a remarkable feat at the time. Chevrolet was accompanied by riding mechanic John Bresnahan. Chevrolet's victory was the last by a driver born outside of the United States until George Robson's victory in the 1946 running.

== Time trials ==
The 1920 winning car

Four-lap (10 miles (16 km)) qualifying runs were introduced in 1920. Previously one-lap runs were used. Ralph DePalma won the pole position at 99.65 mph (160.37 km/h). None of his four laps matched the track record (104.78 mph (168.63 km/h)) set the previous year.

Qualifying Results
Date	Driver	Lap 1 (mph)	Lap 2 (mph)	Lap 3 (mph)	Lap 4 (mph)	Average Speed (mph)
5/26/1920	Ralph DePalma	98.1	99.4	99.5	99.95	99.65

== Starting grid ==
Row	Inside		Inside Center		Outside Center		Outside	
1	Pace car position		2	(United States) Ralph DePalma W	6	(United States) Joe Boyer	3	(United States) Louis Chevrolet
2	26	(France) Jean Chassagne	8	(United States) Art Klein	4	(United States) Gaston Chevrolet	5	(United States) Roscoe Sarles
3	7	(United States) Bennett Hill R	31	(United States) Eddie Hearne	9	(United States) Ray Howard	10	(United States) Tommy Milton
4	29	(United States) Eddie O'Donnell	34	(United States) Willie Haupt	32	(United States) John Boling R	12	(United States) Jimmy Murphy R
5	17	(France) André Boillot	15	(Canada) Pete Henderson	25	(France) René Thomas W	28	(United States) Joe Thomas R
6	18	(United States) Howdy Wilcox W	16	(France) Jules Goux W	19	(France) Jean Porporato	33	(United States) Ralph Mulford

R Indianapolis 500 rookie
W Indianapolis 500 winner

== Box score ==
Finish	Start	No	Name	Entrant	Car	Qual	Rank	Laps	Status
1	6	4	(United States) Gaston Chevrolet	William Small Company	Frontenac	91.550	8	200	88.618 mph
2	18	25	(France) René Thomas W	Ernest Ballot	Ballot	93.950	5	200	+6:19.60
3	11	10	(United States) Tommy Milton	Duesenberg Brothers	Duesenberg	90.200	11	200	+6:30.48
4	15	12	(United States) Jimmy Murphy R	Duesenberg Brothers	Duesenberg	88.700	13	200	+13:59.35
5	1	2	(United States) Ralph DePalma W	Ralph DePalma	Ballot	99.150	1	200	+26:47.15
6	9	31	(United States) Eddie Hearne	Duesenberg Brothers	Duesenberg	88.050	15	200	+31:49.55
7	4	26	(France) Jean Chassagne	Ernest Ballot	Ballot	95.450	4	200	+36:44.65
8	19	28	(United States) Joe Thomas R (Art Klein Laps 105–115) (Harry Thicksten Laps 116–125)	William Small Company	Frontenac	92.800	6	200	+43:09.55
9	23	33	(United States) Ralph Mulford	Ralph Mulford	Mulford–Duesenberg	—	—	200	+1:38:42.25
10	17	15	(Canada) Pete Henderson (Tom Alley Laps 93–200)	Revere Motor Car Corporation	Duesenberg	81.150	21	200	+1:45:21.95
11	14	32	(United States) John Boling R (Riley Brett Laps 99–199)	C. L. Richards	Brett	81.850	20	199	Flagged
12	2	6	(United States) Joe Boyer (Ira Vail Laps 155–191)	Frontenac Motor Corporation	Frontenac	96.900	2	192	Crash T3
13	10	9	(United States) Ray Howard (Aldo Franchi Laps 41–90)	Peugeot Auto Racing Company	Peugeot	84.600	18	150	Camshaft
14	12	29	(United States) Eddie O'Donnell	Duesenberg Brothers	Duesenberg	88.200	14	149	Oil line
15	21	16	(France) Jules Goux W	Jules Goux	Peugeot	84.300	19	148	Engine trouble
16	13	34	(United States) Willie Haupt (Wade Morton Laps 55–111)	Meteor Motors Company	Duesenberg	85.480	16	146	Rod
17	8	7	(United States) Bennett Hill R (Roscoe Sarles Laps 75–115)	Frontenac Motor Corporation	Frontenac	90.550	10	115	Crash T4
18	3	3	(United States) Louis Chevrolet (Salvatore Barbarino Laps 64–79) (Jerry Wunderlich Laps 80–94)	William Small Company	Frontenac	96.300	3	94	Steering
19	20	18	(United States) Howdy Wilcox W	Jules Goux	Peugeot	88.820	12	65	Engine trouble
20	7	5	(United States) Roscoe Sarles	William Small Company	Frontenac	90.750	9	58	Crash T4
21	5	8	(United States) Art Klein	Frontenac Motor Corporation	Frontenac	92.700	7	40	Crash
22	22	19	(France) Jean Porporato	Jean Porporato	Grégoire	79.980	22	23	Ruled off
23	16	17	(France) André Boillot	Jules Goux	Peugeot	85.400	17	16	Engine trouble

Note: Relief drivers in parentheses

W Former Indianapolis 500 winner

R Indianapolis 500 Rookie

=== Statistics ===
Lap Leaders
Laps	Leader
1–11	Joe Boyer
12	Art Klein
13	Jean Chassagne
14–37	Joe Boyer
38–42	Ralph DePalma
43–62	Joe Boyer
63–69	René Thomas
70–107	Joe Boyer
108–112	René Thomas
113–186	Ralph DePalma
187–200	Gaston Chevrolet

Total laps led
Leader	Laps
Joe Boyer	93
Ralph DePalma	79
Gaston Chevrolet	14
René Thomas	12
Jean Chassagne	1
Art Klein	1

== Race details ==
- For 1920, riding mechanics were required.
- First alternate: none

1919 Indianapolis 500; Howdy Wilcox	1920 Indianapolis 500; Gaston Chevrolet	1921 Indianapolis 500; Tommy Milton
