= Gaston Chevrolet =

American racing driver (1892–1920)

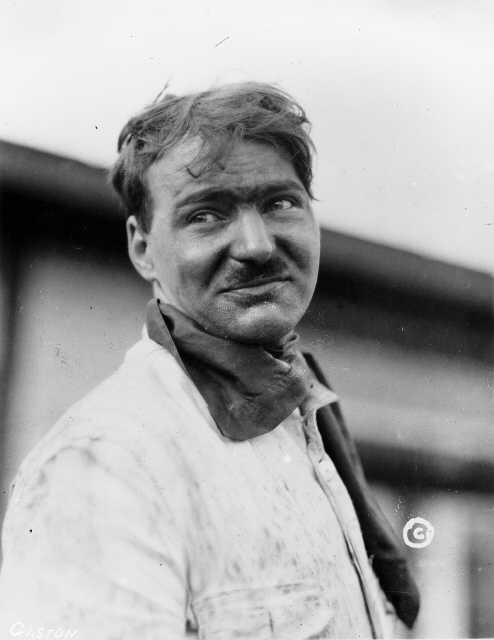
- Chevrolet at Tacoma Speedway in June 1920
- Born: Gaston Louis Chevrolet; October 26, 1892 Beaune, Côte-d'Or, France
- Died: November 25, 1920 (aged 28) Los Angeles, California, U.S.

Championship titles
- AAA Championship Car (1920); Major victories Indianapolis 500 (1920)

Champ Car career
- 15 races run over 4 years
- Best finish: 1st (1920)
- First race: 1917 Sharonville Sweepstakes (Sharonville)
- Last race: 1920 Beverly Hills 250 #2 (Beverly Hills)
- First win: 1919 Independence Auto Derby (Sheepshead Bay)
- Last win: 1920 Indianapolis 500 (Indianapolis)
Wins	Podiums	Poles
4	7	0

Gaston Louis Chevrolet (October 4, 1892 – November 25, 1920) was an American racing driver and automobile manufacturer. He was the winner of both the Indianapolis 500 and the American National Championship in 1920.

== Early life ==
Chevrolet was born near Beaune, in the Côte-d'Or region of France where his Swiss family had emigrated to a few years earlier. His father was a watch-maker, and he was the younger brother of Louis (1878–1941, founder of the Chevrolet car company) and Arthur Chevrolet (1884–1946). After brother Louis emigrated to the United States and earned enough money, he sent for Gaston and Arthur to join him. Once there, Gaston worked as an automotive mechanic and joined his brothers in auto racing.

In 1916, the year after older brother Louis left the Chevrolet car company, Gaston Chevrolet became a partner with Louis and Arthur in the new Frontenac Motor Corporation.

== Indianapolis 500 ==
Driving a Frontenac race car, Chevrolet competed in the 1919 Indianapolis 500, finishing in tenth place while brother Louis finished seventh.

Chevrolet broke the dominance of European built cars in the 1920 Indianapolis 500, winning the race in a redesigned Monroe-Frontenac. In the process, he became the first driver in the history of the 500-mile (800 km) race to go the distance without making a tire change. Gaston was unable to defend his win because of his death later that year. Chevrolet was the last driver born in France to win the Indianapolis 500 until Simon Pagenaud won the 2019 Indianapolis 500, 99 years after the 1920 race.

== 1920 National Championship and death ==
Following his May 31, 1920 victory at Indianapolis, Chevrolet raced in several more events. He won a 100-mile (160 km) match race against top racers Tommy Milton (driving a Chevrolet race car) and Ralph Mulford.

With the coming of winter in late 1920, racing moved to the West Coast. While competing in the last race of the season on the board track at the Beverly Hills Speedway, Chevrolet was killed when his Frontenac crashed on lap 146 of the 200 lap race. He connected with Eddie O'Donnell’s car and both cars tumbled down the embankment. Chevrolet died instantly along with O’Donnell’s riding mechanic while O’Donnell died the next day from a skull fracture.

Chevrolet is interred next to his brother Louis in the Holy Cross and Saint Joseph Cemetery in Indianapolis, Indiana.

=== 1920 National Champion ===
Despite the crash, Chevrolet had accumulated enough points during the race and through the season to win the AAA National Championship for the 1920 season. Later revisionist publications retrospectively began claiming Tommy Milton as the champion, based upon fabricated calculations converting several Non-Championship events into points-paying rounds of the 1920 season. Despite research by professional historians uncovering primary sources confirming Chevrolet's championship, the present-day Astor Challenge Cup has Milton instead of Chevrolet engraved as the champion.

== Awards and honors ==
Chevrolet has been inducted into the following halls of fame:

- Auto Racing Hall of Fame (1964)
- Motorsports Hall of Fame of America (2002)

== Motorsports career results ==
=== Indianapolis 500 results ===
Year	Car	Start	Qual	Rank	Finish	Laps	Led	Retired
1919	41	16	100.400	6	10	200	0	Running
1920	4	6	91.550	8	1	200	14	Running
Totals						400	14	

Starts	2
Poles	0
Front row	0
Wins	1
Top 5	1
Top 10	2
Retired	0

Preceded by Howdy Wilcox	Indianapolis 500 winner 1920	Succeeded by Tommy Milton
