= 1919 Indianapolis 500 =

American motor race

7th Indianapolis 500
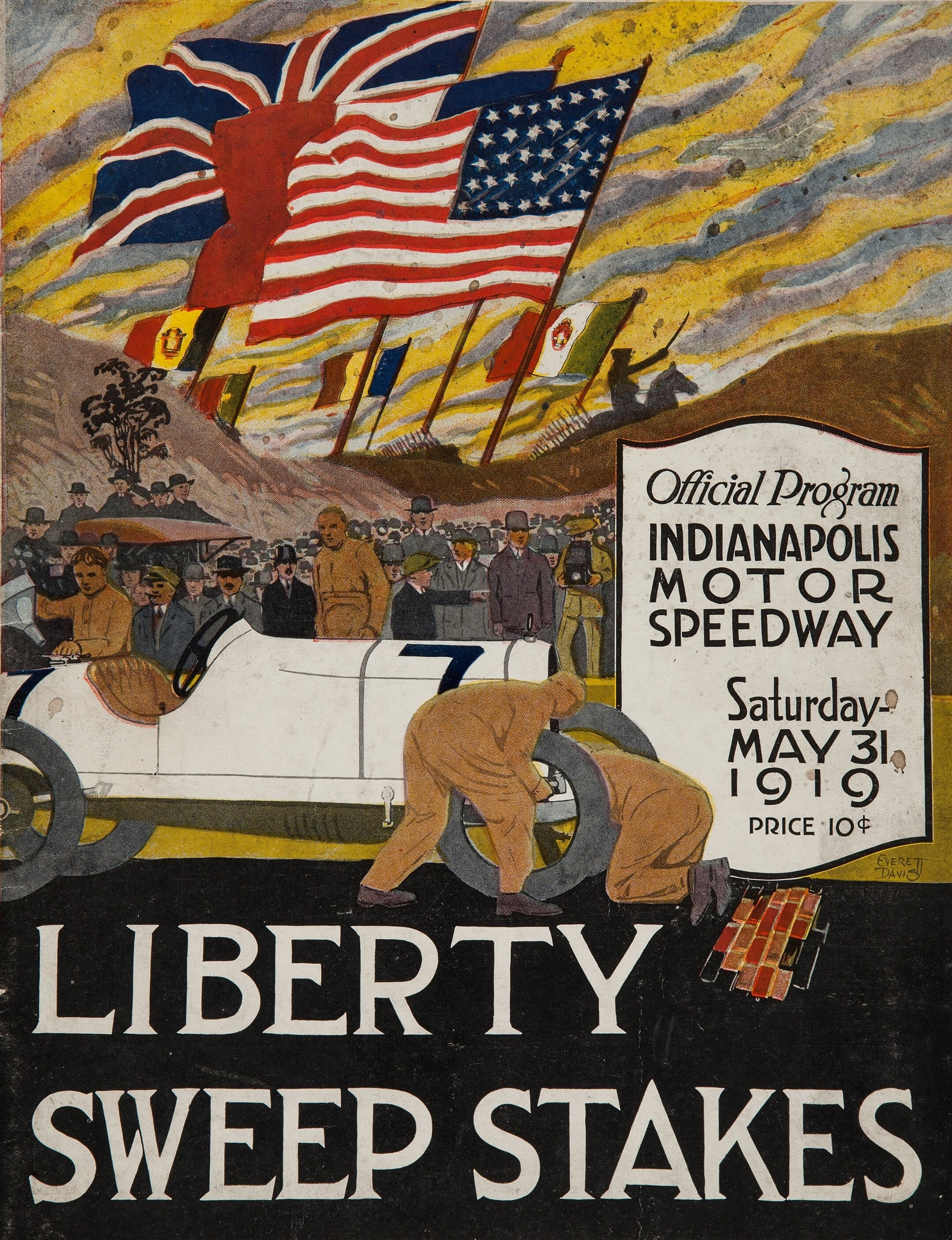

Indianapolis Motor Speedway

Indianapolis 500
- Sanctioning body: AAA
- Date: May 31, 1919
- Winner: Howdy Wilcox
- Winning Riding Mechanic: Leo Banks
- Winning Entrant: I.M.S. Corp.
- Winning Chief Mechanic: Maurice Becker
- Winning time: 5:40:42.87
- Average speed: 88.050 mph (141.703 km/h)
- Pole position: René Thomas
- Pole speed: 104.780 mph (168.627 km/h)
- Most laps led: Howdy Wilcox (98)

Pre-race
- Pace car: Packard V12 (Twin Six)
- Pace car driver: Jesse G. Vincent
- Starter: E. C. Patterson
- Honorary referee: Eddie Rickenbacker
- Estimated attendance: 120,000

Chronology
Previous	Next
1916	1920

The 7th Liberty 500-Mile Sweepstakes was held at the Indianapolis Motor Speedway on Saturday, May 31, 1919.

After a two-year hiatus due to World War I, the Indianapolis 500 returned to competition in 1919. Howdy Wilcox won, accompanied by riding mechanic Leo Banks. More than half the field (19 of 33 cars) consisted of rookie drivers, tied for the most ever, excluding the inaugural race where all 40 cars were considered "rookies." Ralph DePalma, the 1915 winner, and the driver who suffered a defeat in 1912, again put in a strong performance. DePalma led 93 of the first 102 laps, and drove the first half at record-breaking speed. Tire problems, however, necessitated a long pit stop, and DePalma finished in 6th place.

Rain was a factor during practice, limiting available track time in the days immediately leading up to time trials. Since most teams did not arrive until later in the month, some cars had very limited preparation time. Qualifying was supposed to be held on just one day, but officials decided to add two additional days due to the lost track time.

The first half of the race was marred by three fatalities. Driver Arthur Thurman died in a crash on lap 45. On lap 96, Louis LeCocq and his riding mechanic Robert Bandini wrecked in turn two, and both were burned to death.

== Race background ==
Over two years had gone by since the last competitive events had been held at the Speedway. The 1916 race was followed by the Harvest Auto Racing Classic, at which point the track was closed due to the escalation of World War I. When the Armistice was signed in November 1918, the Speedway management was anxious to begin planning for the resumption of the 500-mile race for 1919. Some early rumors circulated that the race may change dates to July 4, or even expand to 1,000 miles. These rumors were briefly entertained when the AAA Contest Board announced that both May 30 and July 4 were being set aside on the calendar for the event.

On December 6, 1918, Speedway business manager T.E. "Pop" Myers announced that the 1919 Indianapolis 500 would be scheduled for Friday, May 30. It was decided to keep the traditional date, and likewise return the race to a distance of 500 miles. The 1916 race had been scheduled for 300 miles (a decision that management subsequently regretted), the only such time which the race was scheduled for a distance shorter than 500 miles. AAA would return as the sanctioning body. An editorial the following day in the Indianapolis News, however, sharply criticized the choice of Memorial Day. It was going to be the first "Decoration Day" holiday following the end of the "Great War", and they believed that the holiday should be left alone to properly honor the many thousands of war casualties. About a week later, Speedway management announced that they would change the date to Saturday May 31. The race was deliberately moved off Memorial Day (Friday May 30) and pushed to Saturday so as not to detract from the holiday.

The race was given a new name for 1919, the Liberty Sweepstakes as a gesture to the peacetime brought on by victory and the end of the war. The new title was used for only one year. Without hesitation, Cliff Durant submitted the first entry on December 16.

== Race schedule ==
Race schedule – May 1919
Sun	Mon	Tue	Wed	Thu	Fri	Sat
				1 Practice	2 Practice	3 Practice
4 Practice	5 Practice	6 Practice	7 Practice	8 Practice	9 Practice	10; Practice
11; Practice	12; Practice	13; Practice	14; Practice	15; Practice	16; Practice	17; Practice
18; Practice	19; Practice	20; Practice	21; Practice	22; Practice	23; Practice	24; Practice
25; Practice	26; Practice	27; Time Trials	28; Time Trials	29; Time Trials	30; Memorial Day	31; Indy 500

Color	Notes
Green	Track Available for Practice
Dark Blue	Time trials
Silver	Race day
Red	Rained out*
Blank	No track activity

* Includes days where track activity
was significantly limited due to rain

== Practice ==
The deadline for entries to be submitted was midnight on Thursday May 1. A total of 43 cars were entered, including three entries by the Indianapolis Motor Speedway. The AAA Contest Board confirmed that the maximum starting field rule of 33 cars would apply.

- Thursday May 1: Omar Toft arrived in Indianapolis after a nine-day drive from Los Angeles. He arrived in just enough time to deliver his entry to the Speedway headquarters. Three other last-minute entries also arrived.
- Friday May 2: Jean Chassagne arrived in town from Wolverhampton, England along with his chief mechanic Thomas Harrison.
- Saturday May 3: Howdy Wilcox was seen perusing the track, in search of a ride. He was rumored to be in line to drive one of the I.M.S. entries.
- Sunday May 4: Jean Chassagne made his first visit to the Speedway. The Sunbeam cars of Chassagne and Dario Resta had reportedly arrived in New York from England. The cars were expected to arrive at the Speedway soon.
- Monday May 5: The Sunbeam cars of Chassagne and Resta arrived in Indianapolis. They were immediately being unpacked and readied for testing on the Speedway.
- Tuesday May 6: Howdy Wilcox became the first driver to take to the track for the month. Wilcox drove one of the I.M.S. Premier entries for several laps over 100 mph. Among those on hand to observe were Arthur Chevrolet, Jules Goux, and Jean Chassagne. Goux's car was being overhauled, while Chassagne's car was expected to arrive at any time.
- Wednesday May 7: Eddie Rickenbacker was named the honorary referee.
- Thursday May 8: The 1916 winner and 1916 National Champion Dario Resta arrived at the Speedway for the Sunbeam entry. He was expected to take the track for preparation soon. Much fanfare was being made that four former winners (Resta, René Thomas, Ralph DePalma, Jules Goux) were expected to attempt to qualify.
- Friday May 9: As the first full week of track availability was coming to an end, still only two non-local teams had arrived at the Speedway. The Ballot team out of France, and the Sunbeam team out of England. Poised to be spirited rivals, both were at the track with their full complement of drivers. The only Americans at the track thus far were Howdy Wilcox, and Elmer T. Shannon.
- Saturday May 10: Visiting the Speedway was Barney Oldfield, in town for his tire company. Oldfield was planning to return later in the month to start his preparations.
- Sunday May 11: No track activity on Sunday. The prevailing topics of discussion for the week focused on the number of foreign entries and foreign drivers vying for the field.
- Monday May 12: Greek driver George Buzane was mentioned as a possible driver for one of the I.M.S. Premier entries. Louis Wagner and Eddie Pullen were among drivers mentioned as possible qualifiers.
- Tuesday May 13: Dario Resta took practice laps for the first time during the month. Carl G. Fisher and James A. Allison were among those watching in attendance. J. J. McCoy arrived at the track, and was expected to start taking laps as soon as his McCoy Special was unpacked. With the prestigious French Grand Prix still not yet revived after the war, Indianapolis was being ranked as the biggest motor race of the year.
- Wednesday May 14: Predictions were being made of record speeds during the race.
- Thursday May 15: Dario Resta was practicing his Ballot entry, but nearly crashed. The shock absorbers were not affixed properly, and when the car hit a bump in turn one, it became airborne. The car jumped a foot off the ground, but Resta was able to slow the car down and keep it from crashing over the embankment. Resta and his crew made repairs, and he was soon back out on the track running several hot laps. Art Klein, Arthur Thurman, and J. M. Reynolds arrived at the Speedway. The expectations were that practice would begin to pick up by Saturday and Sunday.
- Friday May 16: Of discussion was the budding rivalry between the American and European entries. The 7th 500 would be the "rubber match" between the two factions, each of whom had won the race three times apiece.
- Saturday May 17: Rene Thomas was clocked with a lap of 1 minute and 32 seconds, for an average speed of 97 mph. Louis Disbrow took the Detroit Special for a few laps around the track.
- Sunday May 18: More drivers arrived from Europe, including André Boillot, Paul Bablot, and Louis Wagner. Also arriving in town was Ralph DePalma. The track was open for practice, but closed to the public on Sunday. About four or five cars took to the track including Dario Resta and Jean Chassagne in the Sunbeam cars. Resta took some hot laps, while Chassagne took his time. Rene Thomas in the Ballot was observed opening up the throttle down the backstretch, but "loafing" in the turns. George Buzane took some hot laps in one of the I.M.S. Premiers late Sunday afternoon, leading some to think he may attempt to qualify.
- Monday May 19: Howdy Wilcox was officially named to an I.M.S. entry as a teammate to Jules Goux. The Indianapolis Star published a photograph, purported to be the first-ever picture of the track taken from an airplane. Several drivers, including Tommy Milton, were at Uniontown Speedway for another race, and were expected to arrive at Indianapolis soon.
- Tuesday May 20: The Sunbeam cars for Jean Chassagne and Dario Resta were ruled ineligible after it was discovered their engines were oversized. Chief engineer Louis Coatalen discovered the infraction, and informed speedway officials that the team was withdrawing from the event. Tom Alley and A. E. Cotey arrived at the Speedway on Tuesday.
- Wednesday May 21: Many drivers and teams were arriving at the Speedway, but rain and foggy weather was limiting available track time. Charles Kirkpatrick was named to the Detroit Special.
- Thursday May 22: Rain kept cars off the track. After losing his ride with the withdrawn Sunbeam team, Dario Resta joined the Ballot team, possibly to serve as a relief driver on race day.
- Friday May 23: Jesse G. Vincent was named the driver of the pace car. Two entries were scratched, the Jay-Bee Special for P.W. Monaghan, and the Hudson for C.W. Johnson.
- Saturday May 24: The fastest practice lap was made by Ralph DePalma at 98 mph. After many days of rainy weather, sunny conditions saw heavy track activity, including many drivers taking their first laps of the month.
- Sunday May 25: George Buzane crashed and flipped over in the south turns. Buzane and his riding mechanic Carl Weinbrecht were not seriously injured. The track was closed to the public on Sunday.
- Monday May 26: Denny Hickey blew a tire coming out of turn 2, spun the car around three times, and backed into the inside wall on the backstretch. The car suffered only minor damage. During the afternoon, Howdy Wilcox and Jules Goux took to the track together for many laps over the 90 mph range. Ira Hall was also out on the track. Monday was the final full day of practice available before elimination trials began.

== Time trials ==
Time trials were scheduled for three days, May 27–29. Elimination trials consisted of one timed lap. This would be the final time single-lap qualifying runs were used at Indianapolis. In 1920, four-lap time trial runs would be introduced. For the first time, qualifiers would line up in the grid by speed based on the day they qualified. All cars that qualified on the first day would line up by speed rank first, with the fastest qualifier starting on the pole position. The remaining cars that qualified on subsequent days would line up by speed rank behind the first day qualifiers. The cars from the second and third days, however, were merged on the grid. This format was adopted in order to encourage more drivers to qualify early on, instead of waiting until the last minute.

Originally it was planned for all elimination trials to be held on Tuesday, but due to inclement weather, the schedule was expanded to allow Wednesday and Thursday as well. The minimum speed to qualify was set at 80 mph, and the field was set at a maximum of 33 cars. Based on the entries prepared at the track, the expectation was that about six cars would fail to qualify.

In an effort to foil the "bootleg" programs that were being printed and sold in and around the Speedway, car numbers were not assigned until race morning.

=== Tuesday May 27 ===
The first day of time trials was held Tuesday May 27 starting at 10:00 a.m. Ralph DePalma (98.2 mph) was the first car in the field. Former winner René Thomas shattered the track record with a lap of 104.7 mph to secure the pole position. Thomas went out late in the afternoon, deciding to wait out windy conditions. A total of eleven cars completed runs, all over 90 mph. Howdy Wilcox went out after Thomas, and qualified second with a speed of 100.0 mph.

Pos	Name	Average Speed (mph)
1	(France) René Thomas W	104.7
2	(United States) Howdy Wilcox	100.0
3	(France) Albert Guyot	98.3
4	(United States) Ralph DePalma W	98.2
5	(United States) Eddie O'Donnell	97.3
6	(France) Paul Bablot R	94.9
7	(United States) Art Klein	94.9
8	(United States) Eddie Hearne	94.5
9	(United States) Earl Cooper	94.2
10	(United States) Ira Vail R	94.1
11	(United States) Charles Kirkpatrick R	90.0

- Note: Car numbers not assigned until race morning.

Sources: The Indianapolis Star, The Indianapolis News

=== Wednesday May 28 ===
The second day of time trials was held Wednesday May 28. The qualifiers on the second and third day would line up behind the qualifiers from the first day. Louis Chevrolet drove a Frontenac at a speed of 103.1 mph to be the fastest car of the day. Tommy Milton was on his way to qualifying over 101 mph, but his car slowed, and he managed a lap of only 89.9 mph.

During a practice run, Omar Toft spun in the south turns, but avoided contact and was able to continue around. Two cars, Al Cotey and Dave Lewis, made an attempt but failed to qualify. Cotey was too slow (below the 80 mph minimum) and Lewis suffered engine failure. Both drivers were eligible to try again on Thursday.

A total of 13 cars completed qualifying runs Wednesday, filling the field to 24 cars. The final starting positions, however, for those 13 cars would not be finalized until qualifying was completed on Thursday.

Pos	Name	Average Speed (mph)	Notes
12	(United States) Louis Chevrolet	103.1	
13	(France) Louis Wagner R	101.7	
14	(United States) Joe Boyer R	100.9	
15	(United States) Ralph Mulford	100.5	
16	(United States) Gaston Chevrolet R	100.4	
18	(United States) Arthur Thurman R	98.0	
20	(United States) Cliff Durant R	96.5	
23	(United States) Wilbur D'Alene	94.2	
25	(United States) Louis LeCocq R	92.9	
27	(United States) Denny Hickey R	92.5	
29	(United States) Elmer T. Shannon R	91.7	
31	(United States) Tommy Milton R	89.9	
32	(France) André Boillot R	89.5	
—	(United States) Al Cotey R	74.6	Below 80 mph minimum
—	(United States) Dave Lewis	Incomplete	Engine failure

- Note: Car numbers not assigned until race morning.

Sources: The Indianapolis Star, The Indianapolis News

=== Thursday May 29 ===
The third and final day of time trials was held Thursday May 29. The day opened with nine spots available in the field.

The 1913 winner Jules Goux was the final car to qualify. During a practice run on Thursday, he suffered a broken piston and broken connecting rod, which blew a hole in the Peugeot's engine block. The Premier team offered him a spare engine, and Goux spent the entire day working to install it. Late in the day, just minutes before sundown, Goux took the car to the track. After one single warm-up lap, he signaled to officials to start the run. His lap of 95 mph bumped James Reynolds, and Goux surprisingly made the field. Not as lucky was Dave Lewis. A day after suffering engine problems, Evans was on his qualifying lap, running over 100 mph. Two-thirds of the way through the lap, the bearings in the engine burned out, and broke the crankcase.

During an exhibition run, Ralph DePalma attempted to set track records in a 950-c.i.d. car, the same car he set records in at Daytona. He failed to break René Thomas's one-lap record from Tuesday, but he did set 5-mile and 10-mile distance speed records.

Pos	Name	Average Speed (mph)	Notes
17	(United States) W. W. Brown R	99.8	
19	(United States) Roscoe Sarles R	97.75	
21	(United States) Ray Howard R	95.0	
22	(France) Jules Goux W	95.0	
24	(United States) Kurt Hitke R	93.5	
26	(United States) Ora Haibe	92.8	
28	(United States) Tom Alley	92.2	
30	(United States) Omar Toft R	91.5	
33	(United States) J. J. McCoy R	86.5	
—	(United States) James M. Reynolds R	83.5	Bumped by Goux
—	(United States) Al Cotey R	82.9	Too slow
—	(United States) Dave Lewis	Incomplete	Connecting rod

- Note: Car numbers not assigned until race morning.

Sources: The Indianapolis Star, The Indianapolis News

== Starting grid ==
Row	Inside	Inside Center	Outside Center	Outside
1	(France) René Thomas W	(United States) Howdy Wilcox	(France) Albert Guyot	(United States) Ralph DePalma W
2	(United States) Eddie O'Donnell	(France) Paul Bablot R	(United States) Art Klein	(United States) Eddie Hearne
3	(United States) Earl Cooper	(United States) Ira Vail R	(United States) Charles Kirkpatrick R	(United States) Louis Chevrolet
4	(France) Louis Wagner R	(United States) Joe Boyer R	(United States) Ralph Mulford	(United States) Gaston Chevrolet R
5	(United States) W. W. Brown R	(United States) Arthur Thurman R	(United States) Roscoe Sarles R	(United States) Cliff Durant R
6	(United States) Ray Howard R	(France) Jules Goux W	(United States) Wilbur D'Alene	(United States) Kurt Hitke R
7	(United States) Louis LeCocq R	(United States) Ora Haibe	(United States) Denny Hickey R	(United States) Tom Alley
8	(United States) Elmer T. Shannon R	(United States) Omar Toft R	(United States) Tommy Milton R	(France) André Boillot R
9	(United States) J. J. McCoy R			

=== Alternates ===
- First alternate: James M. Reynolds

=== Failed to qualify ===
- Al Cotey – Too slow
- Dave Lewis – Incomplete attempt
- P.W. Monaghan – Withdrew (engine failure)
- H.C. Simmons – Withdrew (engine failure)
- George Buzane – practice crash

== Race recap ==
The start of the race was scheduled for Saturday May 31 at 11:00 a.m. local time. The facility was closed to the public on Friday, but participants were allowed a brief period of practice time on Friday morning for last-minute preparations. The rest of the day was spent prepping the track by scrubbing the brick surface of oil and debris.

Maurice Becker, the riding mechanic for Howdy Wilcox during the month, was disallowed by his family from participating in the race. He was replaced for the race by Leo Banks just hours before the start.

A crowd estimated at 120,000 arrived at the Speedway on a hot and sunny Saturday morning. At 8 a.m., the Purdue Band entertained fans. Pace car driver Jesse G. Vincent, with passenger Eddie Rickenbacker, took the field around for one unscored warm-up lap. At a speed of about 80 mph, the field was released for the start. André Boillot's car initially failed to pull away, but eventually got started, and sprinted to catch up to the rest of the field.

=== First half ===
The first half of the race belonged to 1915 winner Ralph DePalma. Depalma led the first 65 laps, and raced at a record pace. With an average speed of over 92 mph, DePalma was shattering existing track records. Though the pace was incredible, his lead was not large. His closest contenders stayed within reach. Louis Chevrolet took the lead for lap 66–74, before giving it back to DePalma. Also in the top five were Earl Cooper, Howdy Wilcox, and René Thomas.

Two fatal accidents, taking the lives of three competitors, marred the first half of the race. On lap 45, Arthur Thurman lost control at about 90 mph, swerved to the inside wall on the backstretch, then flipped over three times. Thurman was thrown from the car, and landed about twenty-five feet away. He died about ten minutes later as he was being taken to the hospital. His riding mechanic Nicholas Molinaro suffered a fractured skull, but survived.

On the 96th lap, Louis LeCocq and his riding mechanic Robert Bandini lost control and turned over in the exit of turn two. The fuel tank ruptured and burst into flames. Both LeCocq and Bandini were pinned underneath the car, doused with gasoline, and burned to death at the scene. With other cars whizzing by, flaming gasoline was spread in all directions, as crews attempted to extinguish the flames.

=== Second half ===
The 1919 winning car

After dominating most of the first half, Ralph DePalma gave up the lead on lap 103 to make a pit stop. DePalma was experiencing tire trouble, and was forced to make a long stop to make repairs. DePalma lost about ten laps in the pits, and fell out of contention.

Howdy Wilcox took the lead on lap 103, and led the rest of the way. After major crashes and high attrition in the first half, the second half of the race settled down into a steady pace. Only three cars dropped out in the second half, leaving 14 cars running to complete 500 miles. Wilcox made a pit stop for tires and fuel at some point after the 400 mile mark. He came out of the pits with a two-lap lead over Eddie Hearne, and cruised the rest of the way.

Late in the race, Louis Chevrolet reportedly came into the pits on three wheels. He made repairs, and finished in 7th place. After losing much time in the pits, Ralph DePalma worked his way back up to finish 6th. DePalma nipped Chevrolet at the scoring line by a fraction of a second in the battle for 6th. DePalma led 93 laps, bringing his career total so far to 425 laps led – by far the most of any driver during that era. (DePalma would lead 613 laps in his career).

== Box score ==
Finish	Start	No	Name	Entrant	Car	Qual	Rank	Laps	Status
1	2	3	(United States) Howdy Wilcox	Indianapolis Motor Speedway	Peugeot	100.010	7	200	88.050 mph
2	8	14	(United States) Eddie Hearne	R. Cliff Durant	Stutz	94.500	19	200	+3:46.18
3	22	6	(France) Jules Goux W	Indianapolis Motor Speedway	Peugeot–Premier	95.000	15	200	+8:23.31
4	3	32	(France) Albert Guyot	Ernest Ballot	Ballot	98.300	9	200	+14:33.40
5	28	26	(United States) Tom Alley	Ahlberg Bearing Company	Bender	92.200	27	200	+24:21.05
6	4	4	(United States) Ralph DePalma W	Packard Motor Car Company	Packard	98.200	10	200	+29:27.77
7	12	7	(United States) Louis Chevrolet	Frontenac Motors	Frontenac	103.100	2	200	+29:28.05
8	10	27	(United States) Ira Vail R	Hudson Motor Car Company	Hudson	94.100	22	200	+31:59.13
9	27	21	(United States) Denny Hickey R	A. C. Stickle	Hoskins–Hudson	92.500	26	200	+33:14.37
10	16	41	(United States) Gaston Chevrolet R	Frontenac Motors	Frontenac	100.400	6	200	+36:38.92
11	1	31	(France) René Thomas W	Ernest Ballot	Ballot	104.700	1	200	+40:28.05
12	9	8	(United States) Earl Cooper (Reeves Dutton)	Earl Cooper	Stutz	94.250	20	200	+40:52.18
13	29	23	(United States) Elmer T. Shannon R (Ken Rawlings)	Elmer T. Shannon	Shannon–Duesenberg	91.700	28	200	+50:07.88
14	26	17	(United States) Ora Haibe	Hudson Motor Car Company	Hudson	92.800	25	200	+53:45.22
15	32	37	(France) André Boillot R	Jules Goux	Peugeot	89.500	32	195	Crash BS
16	21	48	(United States) Ray Howard R	A. G. Kaufman	Peugeot	95.000	16	130	Oil pressure
17	23	22	(United States) Wilbur D'Alene	Duesenberg Brothers	Duesenberg	94.200	21	120	Axle
18	25	15	(United States) Louis LeCocq R ✝	Roscoe Sarles	Duesenberg	92.900	24	96	Died in crash at T2
19	7	29	(United States) Art Klein	Arthur H. Klein	Peugeot	94.900	18	70	Oil line
20	11	19	(United States) Charles Kirkpatrick R	Frank P. Book	Mercedes	90.000	30	69	Rod
21	6	33	(France) Paul Bablot R (Jean Chassagne)	Ernest Ballot	Ballot	94.900	17	63	Crash
22	5	10	(United States) Eddie O'Donnell	Duesenberg Brothers	Duesenberg	97.300	13	60	Piston
23	24	12	(United States) Kurt Hitke R	Roscoe Sarles	Duesenberg	93.500	23	56	Rod bearing
24	20	1	(United States) Cliff Durant R	R. Cliff Durant	Stutz	96.500	14	54	Steering
25	31	9	(United States) Tommy Milton R	Duesenberg Brothers	Duesenberg	89.900	31	50	Rod
26	13	34	(France) Louis Wagner R	Ernest Ballot	Ballot	101.700	3	44	Broken wheel
27	18	18	(United States) Arthur Thurman R ✝	Arthur Thurman	Duesenberg	98.000	11	44	Died in crash at T3
28	30	43	(United States) Omar Toft R	Omar Toft	Miller	91.500	29	44	Rod
29	15	2	(United States) Ralph Mulford	Ralph Mulford	Frontenac	100.500	5	37	Driveshaft
30	33	36	(United States) J. J. McCoy R	J. J. McCoy	McCoy	86.500	33	36	Oil line
31	14	39	(United States) Joe Boyer R	Frontenac Motors	Frontenac	100.900	4	30	Rear axle
32	17	5	(United States) W. W. Brown R	C. L. Richards	Brown–Hudson-Brett	99.800	8	14	Rod
33	19	28	(United States) Roscoe Sarles R	Barney Oldfield	Miller	97.700	12	8	Rocker arm

Note: Relief drivers in parentheses

W Former Indianapolis 500 winner

R Indianapolis 500 Rookie

=== Race statistics ===
Lap Leaders
Laps	Leader
1–65	Ralph DePalma
66–74	Louis Chevrolet
75–102	Ralph DePalma
103–200	Howdy Wilcox

Total laps led
Laps	Leader
Howdy Wilcox	98
Ralph DePalma	93
Louis Chevrolet	9

== Race details ==
- For 1919, riding mechanics were required.
- It is written that a band played the song "Back Home Again in Indiana" as Crawfordsville, Indiana native Howdy Wilcox led in the final stages of the race, eventually to become not only the first Indiana native, but first American, to win since Joe Dawson in 1912, the year before European cars and drivers had begun entering the race in earnest. It is believed that this was the first time the song was performed at the race, which would later become a traditional fixture of the pre-race ceremonies.
- Howdy Wilcox would be the last Indianapolis 500 winner to use Goodyear tires until A. J. Foyt in 1967.

== Notes ==
=== See also ===
- AAA Contest Board

=== Works cited ===
- Indianapolis 500 Historical Stats: 1919
- ChampCarStats.com - 1919 Liberty 500 Mile Sweepstakes

=== References ===
1916 Indianapolis 500; Dario Resta	1919 Indianapolis 500; Howdy Wilcox	1920 Indianapolis 500; Gaston Chevrolet
