= Ray Howard =

American racing driver (1891–1957)

- Born: Ray L. Howard; August 2, 1891 Rochester, New York, U.S.
- Died: January 29, 1957 (aged 65) near Butler, Indiana, U.S.

Champ Car career
- 5 races run over 3 years
- First race: 1919 Indianapolis 500 (Indianapolis)
- Last race: 1922 Universal Trophy (Uniontown)
Wins	Podiums	Poles
0	0	0

Ray L. Howard (August 2, 1891 – January 29, 1957) was an American racing driver. Howard made three Championship Car starts in 1919 - the 1919 Indianapolis 500 and two races on the Sheepshead Bay Race Track board oval in June of that year driving a Peugeot. He then drove a Peugeot in the 1920 Indianapolis 500. His final start came on the Uniontown Speedway board oval in 1922 driving a Ford and suffering a broken frame on lap 2.

In his later life, Howard lived in Toledo, Ohio, working as an engineer for Dana. He died of a heart attack while on the road near Butler, Indiana.

== Motorsports career results ==
=== Indianapolis 500 results ===
Year	Car	Start	Qual	Rank	Finish	Laps	Led	Retired
1919	48	21	95.000	16	16	130	0	Oil pressure
1920	9	10	84.600	18	13	150	0	Camshaft
Totals						280	0	

Starts	2
Poles	0
Front Row	0
Wins	0
Top 5	0
Top 10	0
Retired	2
