= Willie Haupt =

American racing driver (1885–1966)

- Born: William Edward Haupt; July 10, 1885 Philadelphia, Pennsylvania, U.S.
- Died: April 16, 1966 (aged 80) Elkins Park, Pennsylvania, U.S.

Champ Car career
- 11 races run over 5 years
- First race: 1909 Founder's Week Trophy (Fairmount Park)
- Last race: 1920 Indianapolis 500 (Indianapolis)
Wins	Podiums	Poles
0	1	0

William Edward Haupt (July 10, 1885 – April 16, 1966) was an American racing driver.

== Racing career ==
Haupt drove in four Indianapolis 500s - 1913 thru 1915, and also in the 1920 - with his best finish of ninth coming in the 1913. For a period of time, he may have managed the racing activities of Erwin Bergdoll.

== Later career ==
In 1918, Haupt was an engineer for Haupt & Shaffer Co., and during the Second World War, he worked as an engineer in the aircraft engine laboratory of the Philadelphia Navy Yard.

== Motorsports career results ==
=== Indianapolis 500 results ===
Year	Car	Start	Qual	Rank	Finish	Laps	Led	Retired
1913	35	15	80.760	18	9	200	0	Running
1914	43	28	89.390	15	12	200	0	Running
1915	28	24	80.360	24	11	200	0	Running
1920	34	13	85.480	16	16	146	0	Rod
Totals						746	0	

Starts	4
Poles	0
Front Row	0
Wins	0
Top 5	0
Top 10	1
Retired	1
