= 1917 AAA Championship Car season =

Auto racing season

- AAA National Championship Trail

Season
- Races: 21
- Start date: March 4
- End date: November 29

Awards
- National champion: none declared
- Indianapolis 500 winner: event not held

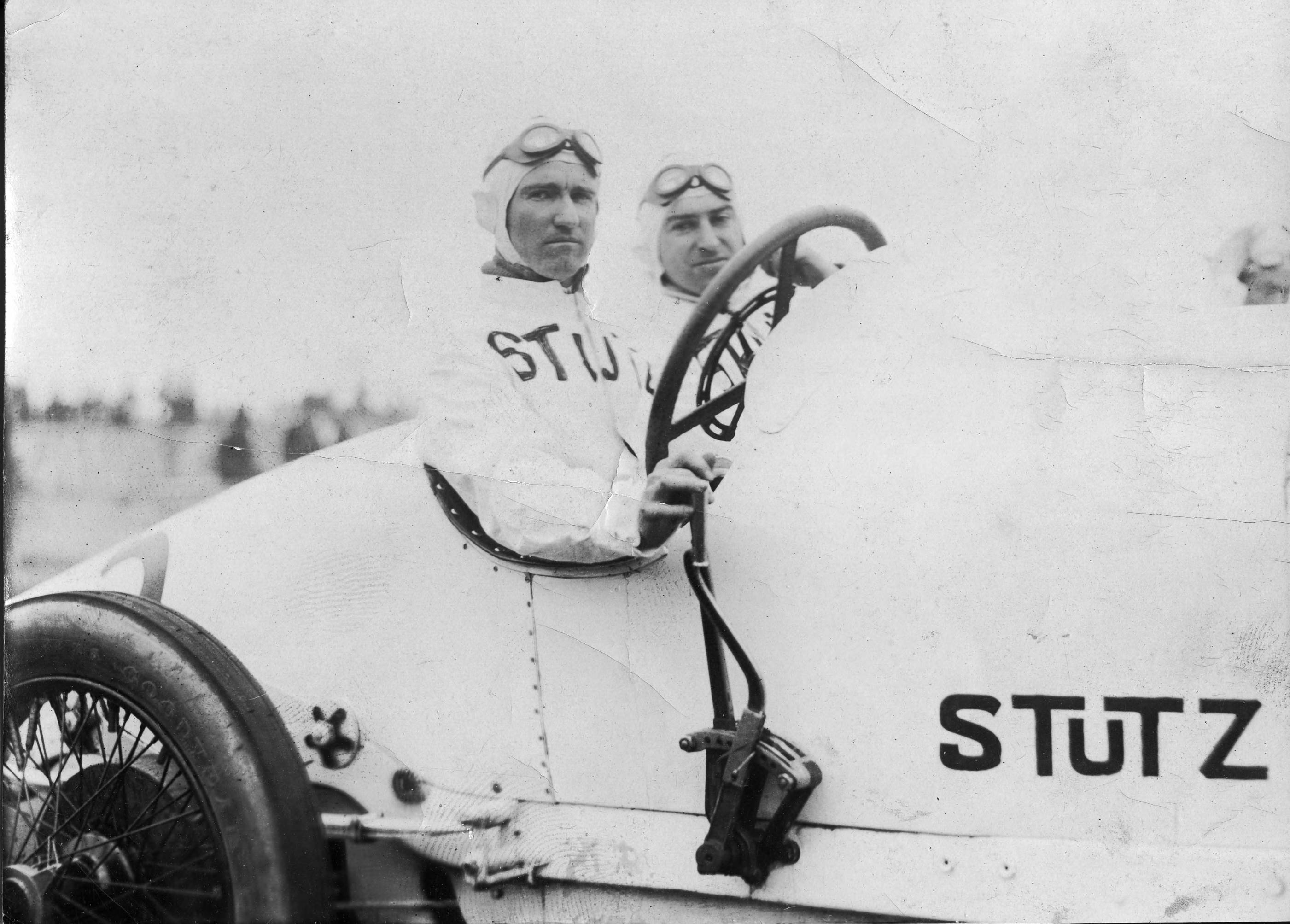
Earl Cooper and his mechanic Reeves Dutton

The 1917 AAA Championship Car season consisted of 21 races, beginning in Los Angeles, California on March 4 and concluding there on November 29. AAA did not award points towards a National Championship during the 1917 season, and did not declare a National Champion.

The de facto National Champion as polled by the American automobile journal Motor Age, was Earl Cooper. Cooper was named the champion by Chris G. Sinsabaugh, an editor at Motor Age, based upon merit and on track performance. A points table was created retroactively in 1927. At a later point, it was recognized by historians that these championship results should be considered unofficial.

== Schedule and results ==
Date	Race Name Distance (miles)	Track	Location	Type	Notes	Pole position	Winning driver
March 4	George Washington Sweepstakes (100)	Ascot Speedway	South Los Angeles, California	1 mile dirt oval		Joe Boyer	Earl Cooper
May 10	Universal Trophy Race (113)	Uniontown Speedway	Uniontown, Pennsylvania	1.125 mile board oval	300 cu in.	Louis Chevrolet	William Taylor
May 30	Sharonville Sweepstakes (250)	Cincinnati Motor Speedway	Sharonville, Ohio	2 mile board oval		Ralph DePalma	Louis Chevrolet
June 16	War Derby (250)	Speedway Park	Maywood, Illinois	2 mile board oval		Louis Chevrolet	Earl Cooper
July 4	Omaha Derby (150)	Omaha Speedway	Omaha, Nebraska	1.25 mile board oval		Louis Chevrolet	Ralph Mulford
July 14	Minneapolis Race 1 (50)	Twin City Motor Speedway	Minneapolis, Minnesota	2 mile concrete oval	300 cu in.	Dave Lewis	Earl Cooper
July 14	Minneapolis Race 2 (100)	Twin City Motor Speedway	Minneapolis, Minnesota	2 mile concrete oval		Dave Lewis	Ira Vail
September 3	Army Post Sweepstakes (100)	Pacific Coast Speedway	Tacoma, Washington	2 mile board oval			Earl Cooper
September 3	Chicago Race 2 (50)	Speedway Park	Maywood, Illinois	2 mile board oval			Ralph DePalma
September 3	Chicago Race 3 (100)	Speedway Park	Maywood, Illinois	2 mile board oval			Louis Chevrolet
September 3	1st Annual Autumn Classic (113)	Uniontown Speedway	Uniontown, Pennsylvania	1.125 mile board oval			Frank Elliott
September 15	Providence Race 1 (5)	Narragansett Park Speedway	Cranston, Rhode Island	1 mile concrete oval	300 cu in.		Ralph Mulford
September 15	Providence Race 2 (25)	Narragansett Park Speedway	Cranston, Rhode Island	1 mile concrete oval	300 cu in.		Tommy Milton
September 15	Providence Race 3 (100)	Narragansett Park Speedway	Cranston, Rhode Island	1 mile concrete oval	300 cu in.		Tommy Milton
September 22	Harkness Trophy Race (100)	Sheepshead Bay Speedway	Sheepshead Bay, New York	2 mile board oval	300 cu in.		Louis Chevrolet
October 13	Chicago Race 4 (20)	Speedway Park	Maywood, Illinois	2 mile board oval			Tom Alley
October 13	Chicago Race 5 (50)	Speedway Park	Maywood, Illinois	2 mile board oval	300 cu in.		Ralph Mulford
October 13	Chicago Race 6 (50)	Speedway Park	Maywood, Illinois	2 mile board oval	300 cu in.		(Canada) Pete Henderson
October 29	Uniontown Race 3 (169)	Uniontown Speedway	Uniontown, Pennsylvania	1.125 mile board oval	300 cu in.	Eddie Hearne	Eddie Hearne
November 29	Ascot Race 2 (10)	Ascot Speedway	South Los Angeles, California	1 mile dirt oval	300 cu in.		Louis Chevrolet
November 29	Ascot Race 3 (50)	Ascot Speedway	South Los Angeles, California	1 mile dirt oval	Free formula		Eddie Hearne

== Leading National Championship standings ==
The points paying system for the 1909–1915 and 1917–1919 season were retroactively applied in 1927 and revised in 1951 using the points system from 1920.

#	Driver	Sponsor	Points
1	Earl Cooper	Stutz	1095
2	Louis Chevrolet	Frontenac	1046
3	Ralph Mulford	Frontenac	868
4	Eddie Hearne	Duesenberg	848
5	Tommy Milton	Duesenberg	771
