= Art Klein =

American racing driver (1889–1955)

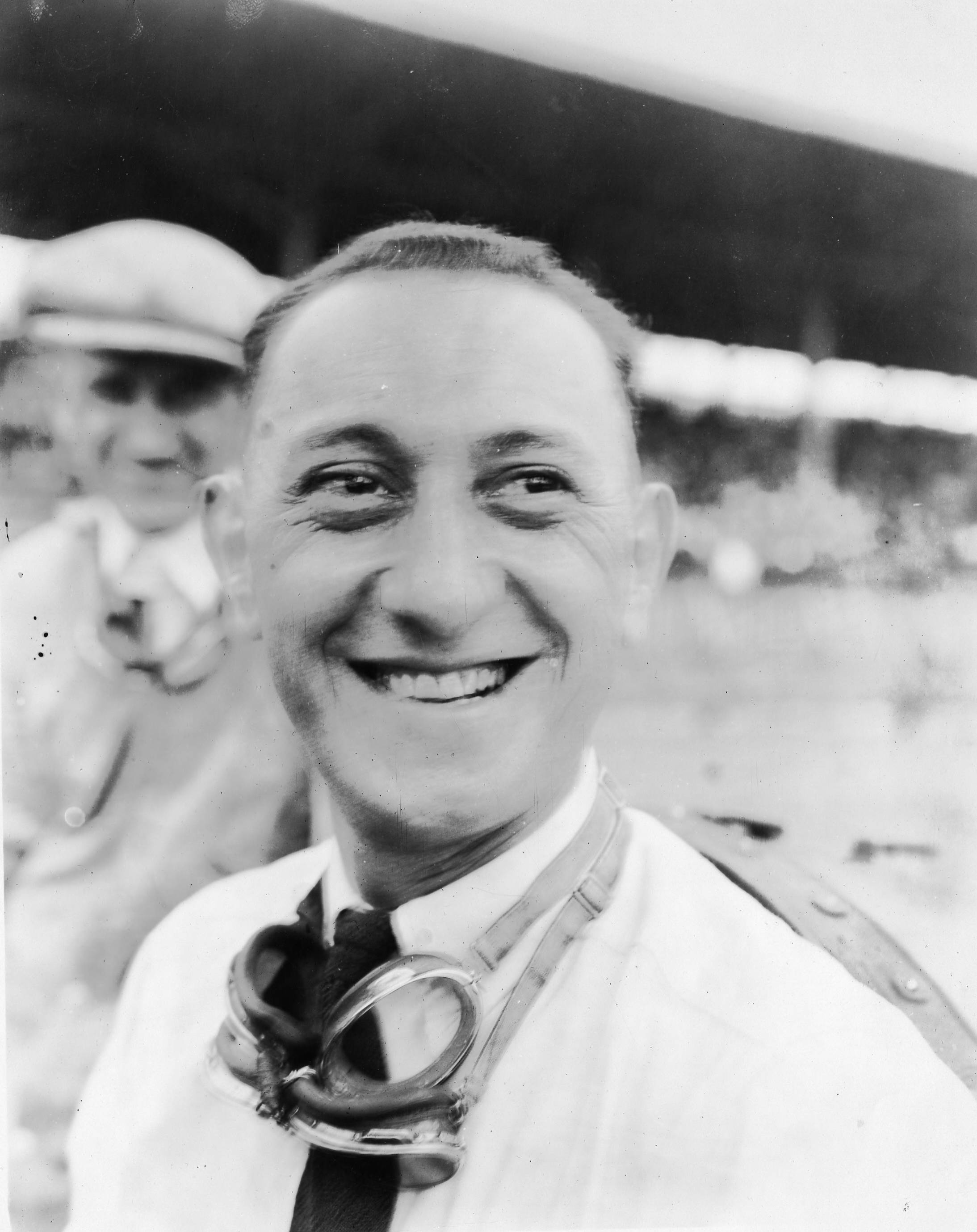
- Klein in 1920
- Born: Arthur Hayes Klein; March 16, 1889 Cleveland, Ohio, U.S.
- Died: June 6, 1955 (aged 66) Los Angeles, California, U.S.

Champ Car career
- 45 races run over 9 years
- Best finish: 11th (1922)
- First race: 1914 Indianapolis 500 (Indianapolis)
- Last race: 1923 Beverly Hills 250 #1 (Beverly Hills)
Wins	Podiums	Poles
0	4	1

Arthur Hayes Klein (March 16, 1889 – June 6, 1955) was an American racing driver.

Klein was an aviator and an engineering officer during World War I, stationed in Issoudun, France. After retiring from racing, Klein later became the head of transportation for Warner Brothers studios, working there until his death.

== Motorsports career results ==
=== Indianapolis 500 results ===
Year	Car	Start	Qual	Rank	Finish	Laps	Led	Retired
1914	15	8	86.870	26	20	87	0	Valve
1915	9	8	90.450	8	18	0	0	Smoking
1919	29	7	94.900	18	19	70	0	Oil line
1920	8	5	92.700	7	21	40	1	Crash
1922	6	25	87.150	23	21	105	0	Rod
Totals						302	1	

Starts	5
Poles	0
Front Row	0
Wins	0
Top 5	0
Top 10	0
Retired	5
