= Arthur Thurman =

American racing driver (1879–1919)

- Born: September 27, 1879 Fort Worth, Texas, U.S.
- Died: May 31, 1919 (aged 39) Indianapolis, Indiana, U.S.

Champ Car career
- 1 race run over 1 year
- First race: 1919 Indianapolis 500 (Indianapolis)
Wins	Podiums	Poles
0	0	0

Arthur Thurman (September 27, 1879 – May 31, 1919) was an American racing driver. Thurman was killed in the 1919 Indianapolis 500; his riding mechanic Nicholas Molinaro survived critical injuries.

== Motorsports career results ==
=== Indianapolis 500 results ===
Year	Car	Start	Qual	Rank	Finish	Laps	Led	Retired
1919	18	18	98.000	11	27	44	0	Crash T3
Totals						44	0	

Starts	1
Poles	0
Front Row	0
Wins	0
Top 5	0
Top 10	0
Retired	1
