= Louis LeCocq =

American racing driver (1892–1919)

- Born: Louis Bennett LeCocq; March 27, 1892 Pella, Iowa, U.S.
- Died: May 31, 1919 (aged 27) Indianapolis, Indiana, U.S.

Champ Car career
- 4 races run over 1 year
- First race: 1919 Santa Monica Race (Santa Monica)
- Last race: 1919 Indianapolis 500 (Indianapolis)
Wins	Podiums	Poles
0	1	0

Louis Bennett LeCocq (March 27, 1892 – May 31, 1919) was an American racing driver. LeCocq and his riding mechanic Robert Bandini were killed in the 1919 Indianapolis 500 after the fuel tank on their "Roamer" ruptured and exploded.

== Motorsports career results ==
=== Indianapolis 500 results ===
Year	Car	Start	Qual	Rank	Finish	Laps	Led	Retired
1919	15	25	92.900	24	18	96	0	Crash T2
Totals						96	0	

Starts	1
Poles	0
Front Row	0
Wins	0
Top 5	0
Top 10	0
Retired	1
