= Earl Cooper =

American racing driver (1886–1965)

- Cooper (left) and Barney Oldfield with their wives in 1926
- Born: Earl Phillips Cooper; December 2, 1886 Broken Bow, Nebraska, U.S.
- Died: October 22, 1965 (aged 78) Atwater, California, U.S.

Champ Car career
- 89 races run over 16 years
- Best finish: 2nd (1924)
- First race: 1911 Oakland Trophy (Portola)
- Last race: 1927 75-mile Race (Rockingham Park)
- First win: 1912 Tacoma Race #2 (Tacoma)
- Last win: 1926 25-mile Heat #1 (Charlotte)
Wins	Podiums	Poles
21	39	3

Earl Phillips Cooper (December 2, 1886 – October 22, 1965) was an American racing driver.

== Racing career ==
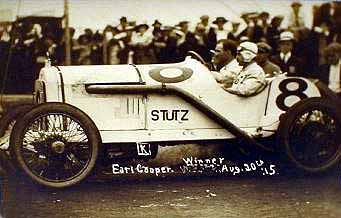
Earl Cooper wins the 300-miler at Elgin, Illinois on August 20, 1915

Cooper began his racing career in 1908 in San Francisco in a borrowed car. He won the race, but lost his job as a mechanic after he beat one of his bosses, so he became a full-time racer. He joined the Stutz team in 1912. In 1913 he won seven of eight major races (and finished second in the other), and won the AAA National Championship. He was injured for the 1914 season. He missed the first several months of the 1915 season, but won the AAA championship anyhow. Cooper got another late start in 1916 after Stutz pulled out of racing, and he finished fifth in the championship. He won his third title in 1917 when the season was shortened by the outbreak of World War I, after which Cooper officially retired from full-time racing.

Cooper raced in the 1919 Indianapolis 500.

Cooper returned to replace Joe Thomas who broke his arm in October 1921, and won a 200-mile (320 km) race at Fresno. He returned to racing full-time in 1922, and won five races in 1923.

Cooper raced in the 1924 Indianapolis 500, and was leading after 400 miles (640 km). A tire blew, and he had to pit. He returned second, and worked his way back to the lead with 30 miles (48 km) left in the race. He blew another tire just as he was passing Joe Boyer, and the pit stop forced him to settle for second. He started at Indy in 1925, and won the pole in his final Indy 500 in 1926. He retired for good in 1928.

Cooper died of a heart attack at his home in Atwater, California on October 22, 1965 at age 78.

== Awards ==
Cooper was inducted in the Motorsports Hall of Fame of America in 2001.

== Motorsports career results ==
=== Indianapolis 500 results ===
Year	Car	Start	Qual	Rank	Finish	Laps	Led	Retired
1914	2	14	88.020	20	18	118	0	Broken wheel
1915	4	4	96.770	4	4	200	0	Running
1919	8	9	94.250	20	12	200	0	Running
1923	29	12	99.400	6	21	21	0	Crash BS
1924	8	6	103.900	6	2	200	119	Running
1925	2	4	110.487	4	17	127	4	Crash T1
1926	5	1	111.735	1	16	73	0	Transmission
Totals						939	123	

Starts	7
Poles	1
Front Row	1
Wins	0
Top 5	2
Top 10	2
Retired	4
