= Ira Vail =

American racing driver (1893–1979)

- Born: Ira Malcolm Gardner Vail; November 22, 1893 Montréal, Québec, Canada
- Died: April 21, 1979 (aged 85) Daytona Beach, Florida, U.S.

Champ Car career
- 46 races run over 12 years
- Best finish: 11th (1920)
- First race: 1915 Providence 100 (Narragansett Park)
- Last race: 1925 Indianapolis 500 (Indianapolis)
- First win: 1917 Minneapolis 100 (Twin City)
Wins	Podiums	Poles
1	12	1

Ira Malcolm Gardner Vail (November 22, 1893 – April 21, 1979) was an American racing driver and auto racing promoter.

== Early life ==
Vail was born in Montréal, Québec. When he was three months old, Vail's mother emigrated with him to Syracuse, New York, where he was raised.

== Racing career ==
Vail raced sprint and championship cars in the AAA-sanctioned racing series. He competed in five Indianapolis 500s, with a best finish of 7th in 1921, before retiring in 1925.

In a quote about his career for a book, Vail stated:

"The car I drove, I bought it from Harry Miller for $10,000. That's what they all cost, a Miller or a Duesenberg, from $8,000-$10,000, which was a lot of money at a time when a good passenger car cost only $1,000. But you could win $30,000 or more at Indianapolis and as much as $5,000 at a cement track in Minneapolis or tracks in Hartford, Boston, everywhere. You'd be guaranteed (cash) even if you didn't win, depending on the deal you made with the promoter. It depended on how many people you could draw. I got guarantees at most tracks and I'd drive at 15 or 20 tracks a year."

After his retirement from driving, Vail promoted AAA and USAC sanctioned auto racing in the Northeastern United States. From 1925 until 1971, Vail promoted the New York State Fair Championship race at the Syracuse Mile. He nicknamed the race track "The Moody Mile" after driver Wes Moody turned a 100-mile per hour lap in 1970.

Vail died in Daytona Beach, Florida.

== Award ==
- Vail was inducted in the National Sprint Car Hall of Fame in the United States in 1993.

== Motorsports career results ==
=== Indianapolis 500 results ===
Year	Car	Start	Qual	Rank	Finish	Laps	Led	Retired
1919	27	10	94.100	22	8	200	0	Running
1921	3	10	82.350	22	7	200	0	Running
1922	1	9	96.750	10	8	200	0	Running
1924	6	15	96.400	15	8	200	0	Running
1925	19	19	104.785	12	20	63	0	Rod
Totals						863	0	

Starts	5
Poles	0
Front Row	0
Wins	0
Top 5	0
Top 10	4
Retired	1
