= Uniontown Speedway =

Former motorsports track in Pennsylvania

- Location: Hopwood, Pennsylvania
- Coordinates: 39°52′38″N 79°42′39″W}
- Opened: 1916
- Closed: 1922
- Major events: Universal Trophy; Liberty Sweepstakes; Autumn Classic; AAA Championship Car

Board (1916–1922)
- Surface: Wood
- Length: 1.1 mi (1.8 km)
- Banking: 34°

Dirt (1946–?)
- Surface: Dirt
- Length: 0.500 mi (.805 km)

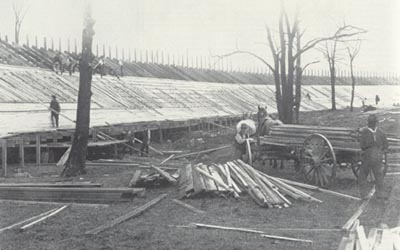
Construction of the Uniontown Speedway in 1916

Uniontown Speedway was a wooden board track in Hopwood, near Uniontown, Pennsylvania. The track was built in 1916, after the Summit Mountain Hill Climbs were outlawed, and held its final race in June 1922. The May/June race was known as the Universal Trophy, so named because Carl Laemmle, president of Universal Films, had sponsored the $3,000, solid silver trophy. Laemmle's company filmed each race, playing them at local theaters. Two National Championship races were held at Uniontown, in 1921 and 1922.

== History ==
Motorsport was extremely dangerous in the days of the board tracks, but the inaugural race at Uniontown on December 2, 1916 was an especially bloody event, even for the standards of the day. Two were killed (a driver and his riding mechanic) during practice a few days prior, and five (two spectators and three participants) died during the race. The track's future was thwarted after track president Charlie Johnson reportedly ran off to Cuba with the track's proceeds.

A second Uniontown Speedway, adjacent to the original site, was active in 1946, as a half-mile (.805 km) dirt track. It held a National Championship-level sprint car race won by Ted Horn.

== AAA Championship Car results ==
Non-championship races in italics

Year	Date	Winner	Car
1916	December 2	(United States) Louis Chevrolet	Frontenac
1917	May 10	(United States) William Taylor	Stutz-Wisconsin
1917	September 3	(United States) Frank Elliott	Delage
1917	October 29	(United States) Eddie Hearne	Duesenberg
1918	May 16	(United States) Ralph Mulford	Frontenac
1918	July 18	(United States) Louis Chevrolet	Frontenac
1918	September 2	(United States) Ralph Mulford	Frontenac
1919	May 19	(United States) Tommy Milton	Duesenberg
1919	July 19	(United States) Tommy Milton	Duesenberg
1919	September 1	(United States) Gaston Chevrolet / (United States) Joe Boyer^{A}	Frontenac
1920	June 19	(United States) Tommy Milton	Duesenberg
1920	September 6	(United States) Tommy Milton	Duesenberg
1921	June 18	(United States) Roscoe Sarles	Duesenberg
1921	September 5	(United States) I. P. Fetterman	Duesenberg
1922	June 17	(United States) Jimmy Murphy	Duesenberg-Miller

^A Shared drive

Year	Date	Winner	Car
1946	August 25	(United States) Ted Horn	Horn-Offy

== See also ==
- Beverly Hills Speedway
- Tacoma Speedway
- AAA Contest Board
- American Championship car racing
