= Cliff Durant =

American racing driver (1890–1937)

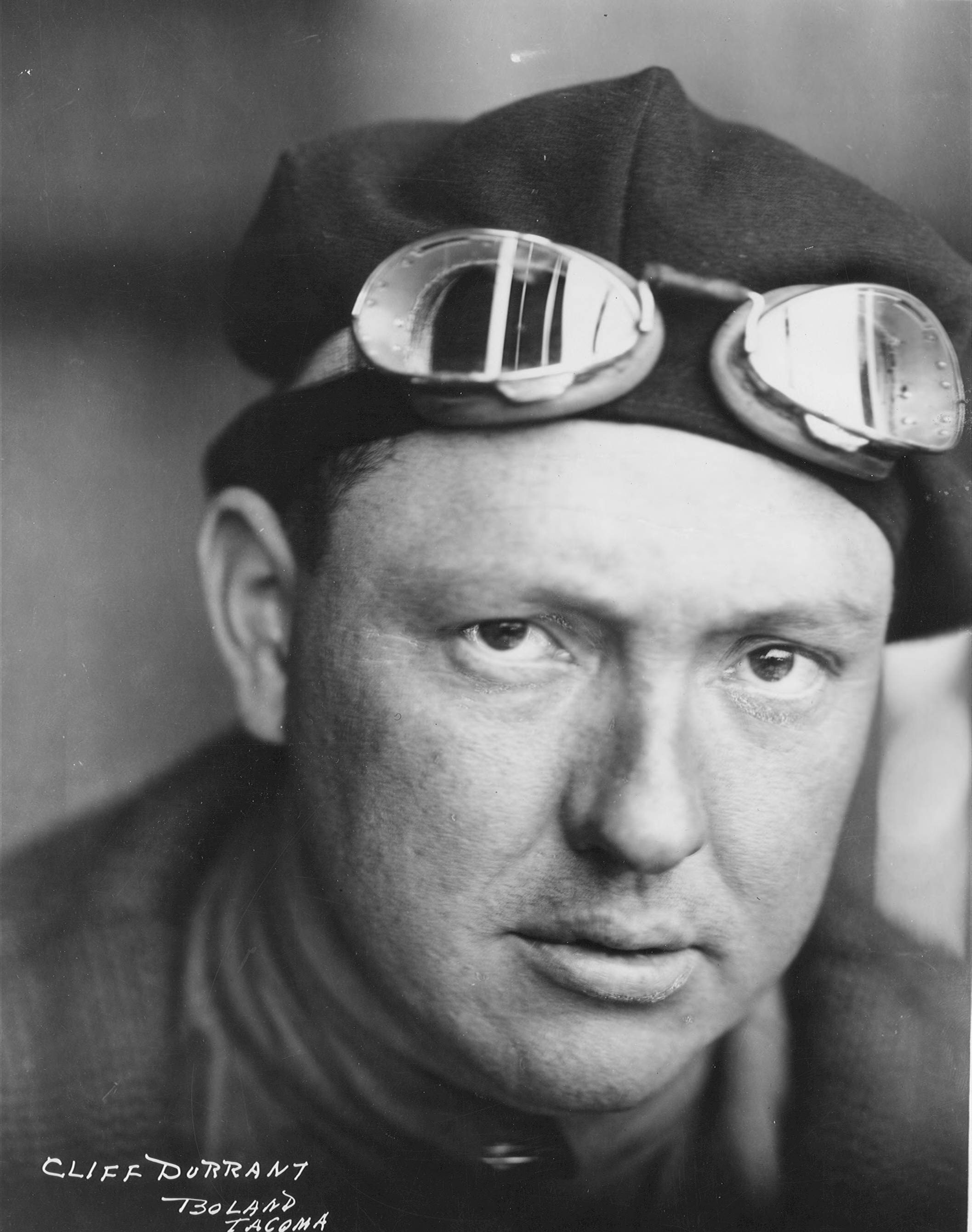
- Durant in 1919
- Born: Russell Clifford Durant; November 26, 1890 Flint, Michigan, U.S.
- Died: October 31, 1937 (aged 46) Beverly Hills, California, U.S.

Champ Car career
- 34 races run over 14 years
- Best finish: 14th (1923)
- First race: 1915 American Grand Prize (Panama–Pacific)
- Last race: 1928 Indianapolis 500 (Indianapolis)
- First win: 1918 24-mile Sprint (Tacoma)
- Last win: 1919 Santa Monica Race (Santa Monica)
Wins	Podiums	Poles
3	9	0

Russell Clifford Durant (November 26, 1890 – October 31, 1937) was an American playboy and racing driver.

== Early life ==
Durant was born in Flint, Michigan, the son of William C. Durant and Clara Miller Pitt. His older sister, Margery Durant, was three years his senior. In 1900, the family lived at 704 Garland Street in Flint and were attended by servants. Durant went to Flint grammar schools and later the University of Detroit and the Pennsylvania Military Academy. In 1908, his parents divorced and in the divorce settlement, Durant's mother, Clara, was granted the house on Garland Street.

== Personal life ==
Durant had four marriages and was rumored to treat his wives poorly through extramarital affairs and physical abuse. Durant's four wives were Lena Pearl McFarland, Adelaide Pearl Frost, Lea Gapsky, and Charlotte Phillips. His second wife, Adelaide Pearl Frost (1885–1977), whom he married on September 1, 1911, was a singing star who later married fellow racer, and World War I flying ace, Eddie Rickenbacker.

== Racing activities ==
=== Santa Monica 1919 ===
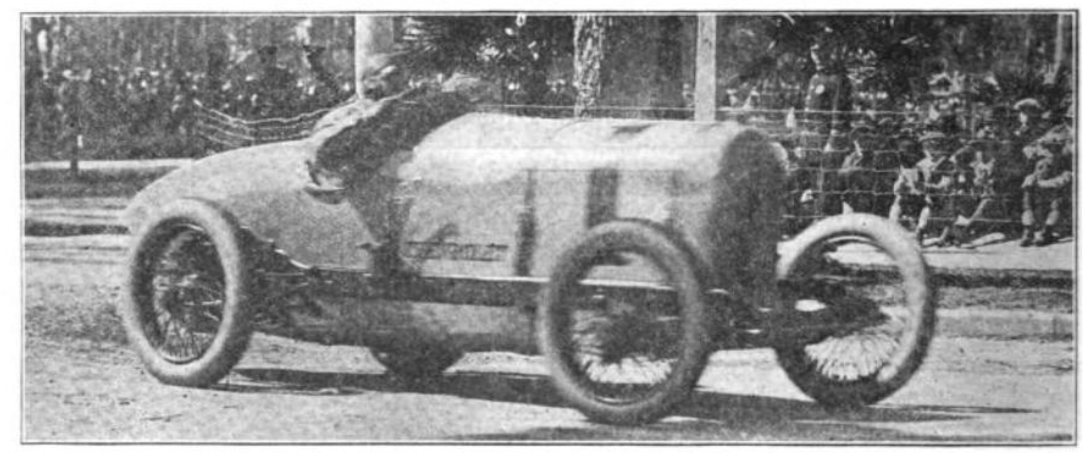
Chevrolet Special driven by Durant in the 1919 Santa Monica Race

In 1919, Durant was named the "Pacific Coast Champion," when he drove a blue Chevrolet-sponsored "Special" to victory in the Santa Monica Road Race. (The car was actually a 1915 Stutz, but called a Chevrolet due to his father regaining control of General Motors.) He averaged 81.28 miles per hour (130.81 km/h) in the open topped machine for a total of 3 hours and 4 minutes. His teammate, Eddie Hearne, finished only 7 minutes behind Durant (also in a rebadged 1915 Stutz). Throughout the run, neither Durant nor Hearne were lapped by any other drivers in all of the 250 miles (400 km) on the course. Durant only pitted twice, for tire changes. One of those pit stops was for a tire that blew while he was running almost 100 miles per hour (160 km/h).

=== Beverly Hills Speedway ownership ===
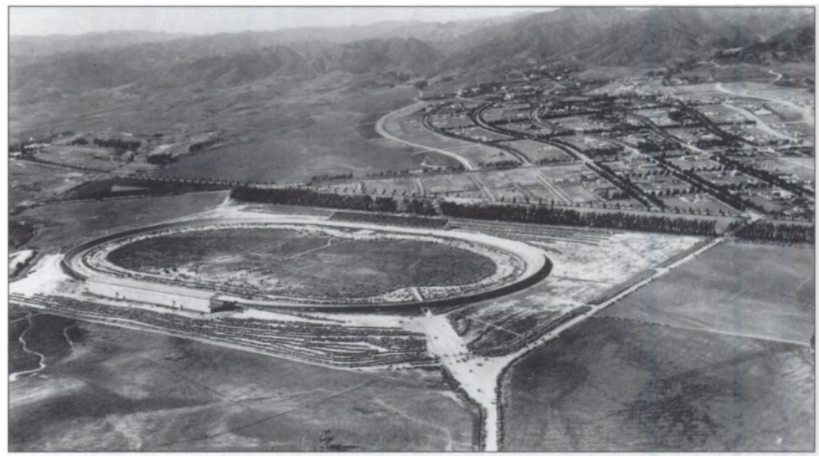
Beverly Hills Speedway located at Wilshire Boulevard and Beverly Drive

Durant was a co-owner of the Beverly Hills Speedway (1920–1924), a 1 1/4-mile (2 km) board track, along with the Speedway Association, which consisted of Durant, Cecil B. DeMille, Jake Dansinger and Silsbee Spalding, among others. It was located at the site of the present Beverly Wilshire Hotel.

In its day, it rivaled the Indianapolis Motor Speedway for speed. In May 1923, Durant shattered eight world speed records for events 75 miles (121 km) and under at the Beverly Hills Speedway.

=== Detroit Special ===
Early in 1927, Durant financed the design and construction of an 8-cylinder front-wheel drive vehicle, designed and built by C. W. Van Ranst and Tommy Milton. The vehicle was assembled in a basement laboratory at the General Motors Building in Detroit and, as such, was named the "Detroit Special" in honor of the city in which it was built. The vehicle was later purchased by Harry Hartz, who installed a new Miller engine. Durant was to have driven the car in the 1932 Indianapolis 500. Instead it was driven by Fred Frame, who won the race.

=== Other racing accomplishments ===
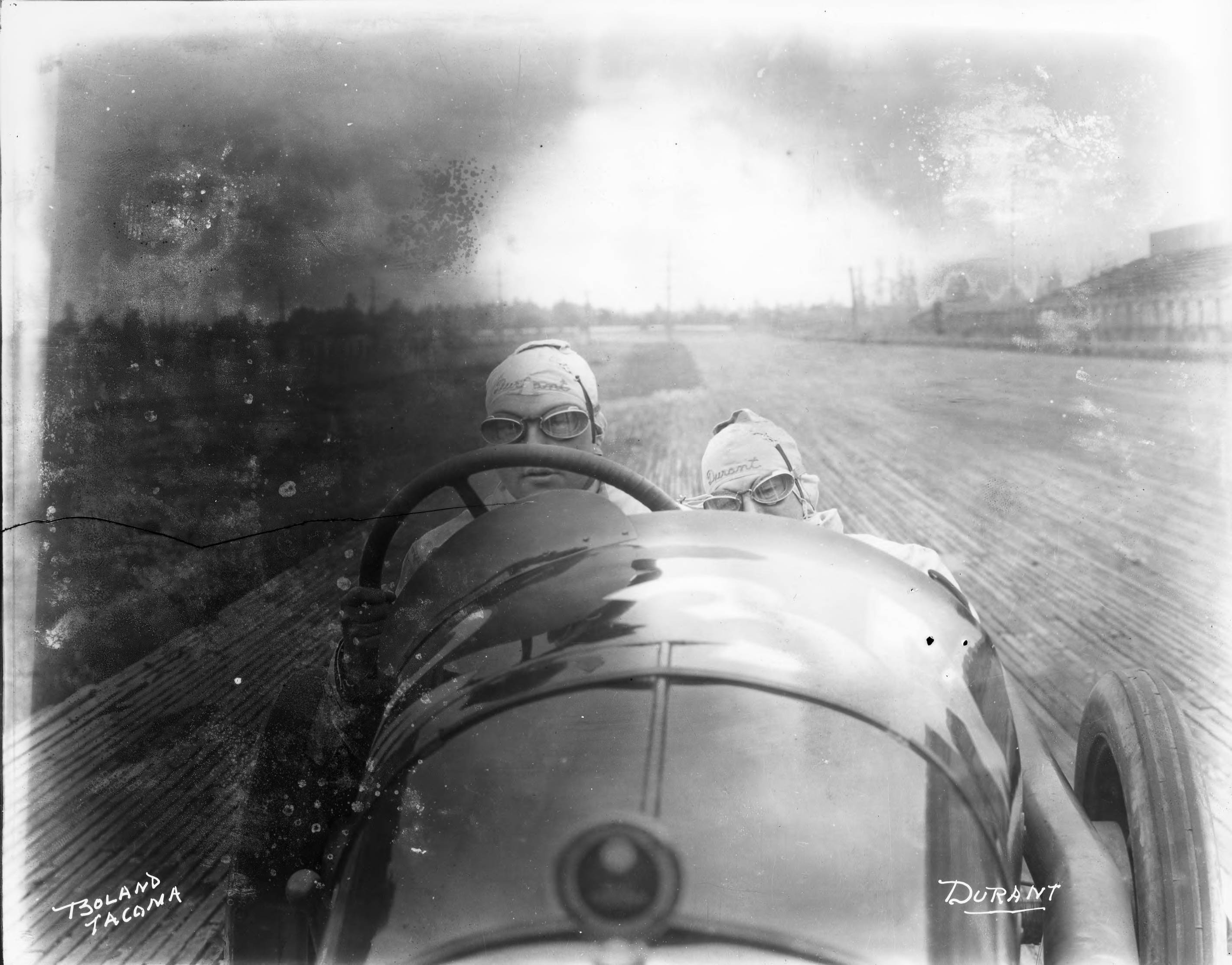
Durant at Tacoma Speedway in 1922

Durant competed at many tracks and events around the country, including: Santa Monica and Corona road races, Tacoma Speedway, Cactus Derby (a challenging off-road race between Los Angeles and Phoenix), and the Indy 500.

In the 1923 Indianapolis 500, Durant had the largest stable of cars (6) ever to participate in the Indianapolis 500 until modern times. He finished in seventh that year.

Durant was the financial backer of the famous Harry Miller racing engines, which dominated the racing world in the 1920s–30s.

== Other activities ==
Durant had his own flight school, airplanes for sale, and a 72-acre (290,000 m^{2}) field, "Durant Field" in Oakland, California in 1919. It was located between 80th Ave., 83rd Ave., and Snell Street. He also had Air Mail contracts for mail delivery with the government and his airport was the terminus for the first transcontinental air mail flight in August 1920.

In 1921, Durant was a partner with Thomas O'Brian in the Lebec Hotel in the Mountains north of Los Angeles near present-day I-5.

Durant had a large estate in Roscommon, Michigan on the South Branch of the Au Sable River, where "The Castle," a 54-room mansion, burned to the ground February 6, 1931. On the estate was his own private air strip, with several planes. On April 25, 1930, test pilot Herbert J. Fahy died two days after an airplane he had been showing Durant had crashed on takeoff at this airstrip. Fahy and his wife Claire, both prominent pilots, acted as sales agents for Lockheed. Durant agreed to buy the airplane if the Fahys could prove that the Sirius could land and take off safely from Durant's personal strip. Herb and Claire Fahy landed the plane without incident, but as they took off, one of the wheels hit a partially hidden stump, which flipped the plane over. Herb Fahy, at age 33, sustained a fractured skull and a severe concussion from which he never recovered.

The community airport in Roscommon, Michigan, was named Durant Field in his honor on July 16, 1933.

At various times in his career, Durant presided over the West Coast division of Durant Motors, and had been vice president of sales for Chevrolet in Oakland, California. He left Chevrolet in 1921, after his father, W.C. "Billy" Durant, left General Motors.

Durant was an accomplished musician as well, playing the violin. He owned the Guarneri del Gesu violin, and played the piano and trumpet. He was at one time the owner of one of the most prized collections of violins in the world.

In addition to being a businessman, race car driver, aviator and musician, Durant was also a yachtsman who owned the sailing yacht "Aurora."

== Death ==
Durant died of a heart attack at his West Hollywood home on October 31, 1937, aged 46. His wife, Charlotte Phillips, had summoned medical assistance but he was pronounced dead when the assistance arrived. He is buried at Forest Lawn Memorial Park in Glendale, California.

== Motorsports career results ==
=== Indianapolis 500 results ===
Year	Car	Start	Qual	Rank	Finish	Laps	Led	Retired
1919	1	20	96.500	14	24	54	0	Steering
1922	34	11	95.850	12	12	200	0	Running
1923	8	10	102.650	4	7	200	4	Running
1924	16	8	101.610	8	13	199	0	Out of gas
1926	9	11	104.855	12	17	60	0	Fuel tank leak
1928	5	18	99.990	26	16	175	0	Supercharger
Totals						888	4	

Starts	6
Poles	0
Front Row	0
Wins	0
Top 5	0
Top 10	1
Retired	4
