= Ralph Mulford =

American racing driver (1884–1973)

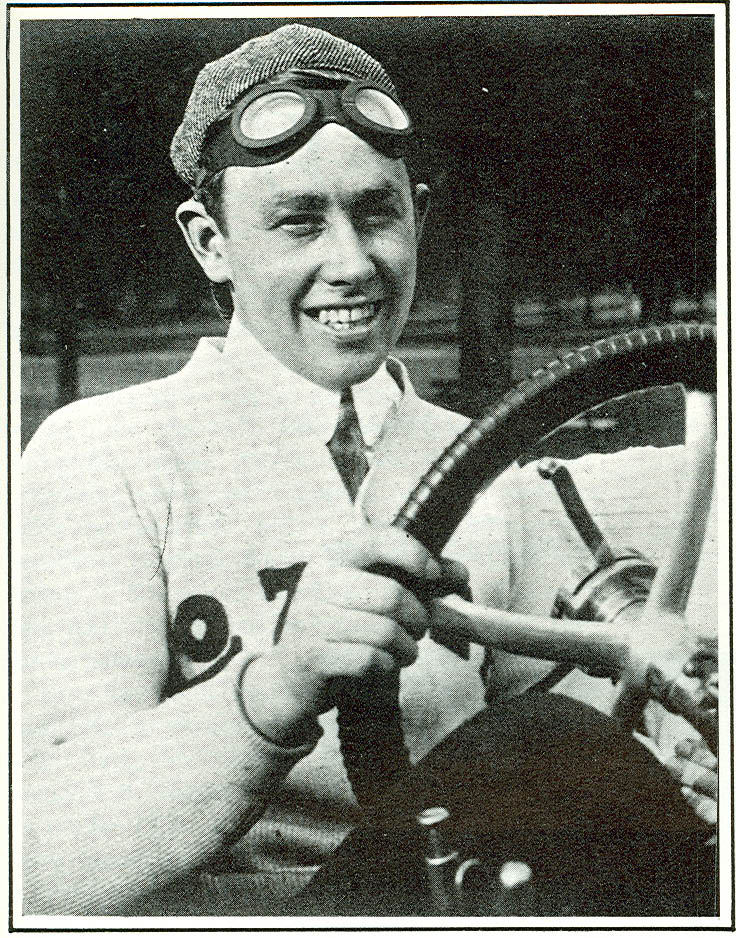
- Mulford, circa 1911
- Born: Ralph Kirkman Mulford; December 28, 1884 Brooklyn, New York, U.S.
- Died: October 23, 1973 (aged 88) Worcester, Massachusetts, U.S.

Championship titles
- Major victories Vanderbilt Cup (1911)

Champ Car career
- 87 races run over 15 years
- Best finish: 8th (1920)
- First race: 1910 Elgin National Trophy (Elgin)
- Last race: 1922 Kansas City 300 (Kansas City)
- First win: 1910 Elgin National Trophy (Elgin)
- Last win: 1919 40-mile Race (Tacoma)
Wins	Podiums	Poles
19	42	0

Ralph Kirkman Mulford (December 28, 1884 – October 23, 1973) was an American racing driver who participated in the 1911 Indianapolis 500. In 1911, he won the Vanderbilt Cup in Savannah, Georgia.

== Biography ==
Mulford was born on December 28, 1884, in Brooklyn, New York. He once served as a Sunday school teacher.

Mulford won the Elgin Trophy on August 26, 1910. He then finished second in the inaugural Indianapolis 500 on May 30, 1911. While contemporary newspaper accounts and substantiated research, including by Indianapolis Motor Speedway historian Donald Davidson, have produced no credible evidence to support a claim to the contrary, there is an urban myth that Mulford, driving a Lozier, was the actual winner over Ray Harroun. However, Mulford himself never supported such a claim.

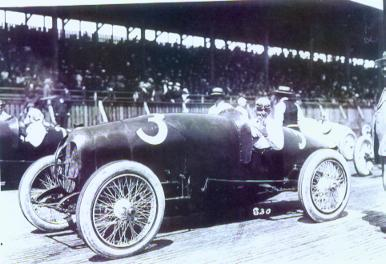
Mulford at the Tacoma Speedway in 1922

Mulford was retroactively declared the National Driving Champion for 1911 and 1918. He retired from racing on tracks after 1922, but continued to compete for several more years in hill climbs, and – at one time – held the record for both the Mount Washington and Pikes Peak climbs.

Mulford died on October 23, 1973 at a nursing home Worcester, Massachusetts, age 87. At the time of his death, he was the last surviving participant of the inaugural, 1911 Indianapolis 500.

== Motorsports career results ==
=== Indianapolis 500 results ===
Year	Car	Start	Qual	Rank	Finish	Laps	Led	Retired
1911	33	29	—	—	2	200	10	Running
1912	19	16	87.880	2	10	200	0	Running
1913	29	22	80.790	17	7	200	0	Running
1914	23	6	88.210	18	11	200	0	Running
1915	22	18	82.720	18	16	124	0	Rod
1916	10	20	91.090	10	3	120	0	Running
1919	2	15	100.500	5	29	37	0	Driveshaft
1920	33	23	—	—	9	200	0	Running
1921	8	21	91.700	12	9	177	0	Flagged
1922	5	5	99.200	5	19	161	0	Rod
Totals						1619	10	

Starts	10
Poles	0
Front Row	0
Wins	0
Top 5	2
Top 10	6
Retired	3
