= Joe Boyer =

American racing driver (1890–1924)

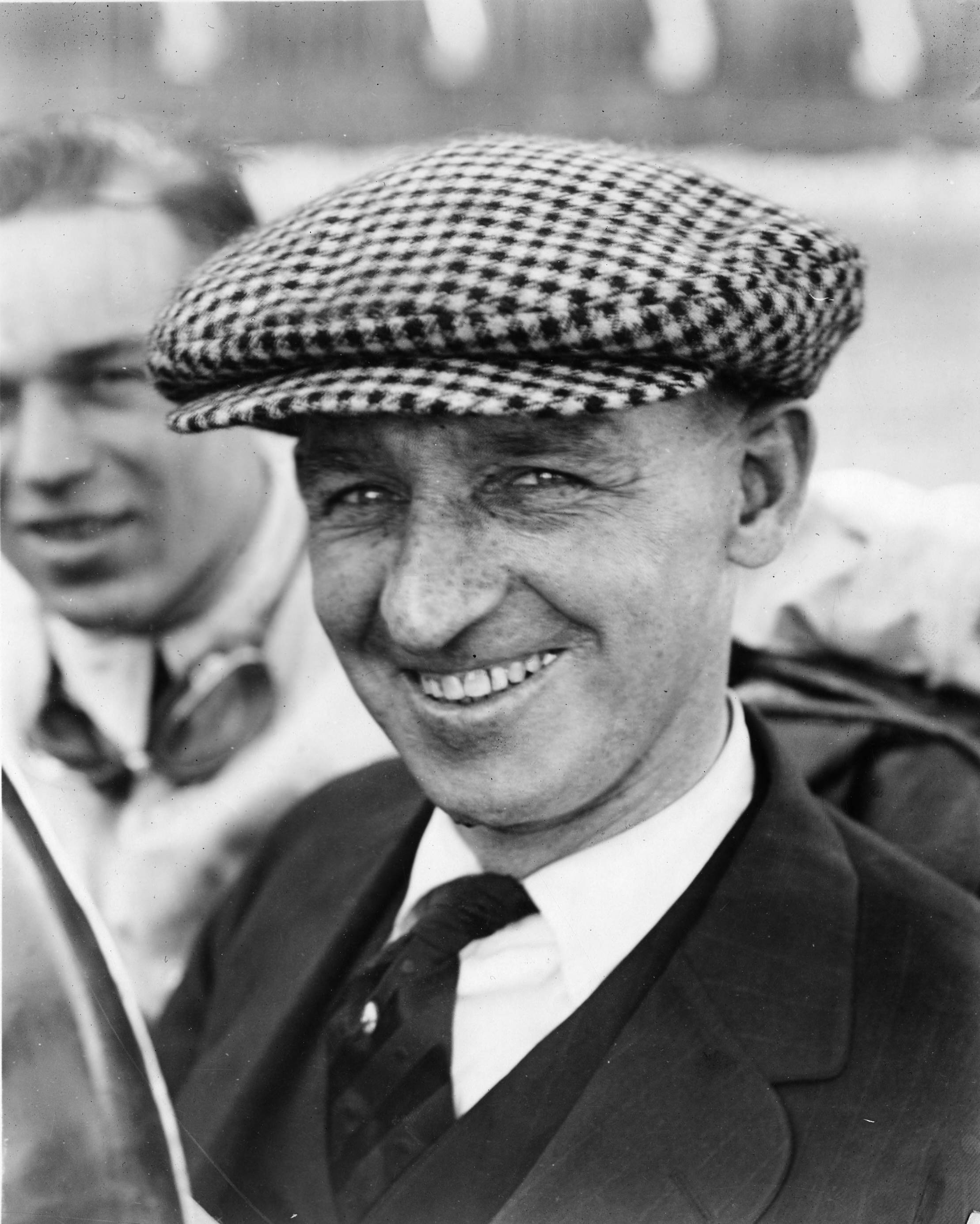
- Boyer at Tacoma Speedway in 1920
- Born: Joseph Boyer Jr. May 30, 1890 St. Louis, Missouri, U.S.
- Died: September 2, 1924 (aged 34) Tipton, Pennsylvania, U.S.

Championship titles
- Major victories Indianapolis 500 (1924)

Champ Car career
- 28 races run over 7 years
- Best finish: 21st (tie) (1923)
- First race: 1917 George Washington; Sweepstakes (Ascot Speedway)
- Last race: 1924 Fall Classic (Altoona)
- First win: 1919 Autumn Classic (Uniontown)
- Last win: 1924 Indianapolis 500 (Indianapolis)
Wins	Podiums	Poles
3	7	1

Joseph Boyer Jr. (May 30, 1890 – September 2, 1924) was an American racing driver, and a winner of the 1924 Indianapolis 500.

== Early life ==
Boyer was born on May 30, 1890, in St. Louis, Missouri and grew up in Detroit, Michigan, the son of Joe Boyer Senior and Clara Libby. He became wealthy due to his father owning Burroughs Adding Machine Company and Chicago Numatic.

== Racing career ==
At the 1924 Indianapolis 500, Boyer participated in two different cars during the race. In his original entry (#9), he qualified fourth. Boyer experienced mechanical troubles, and on the 109th lap he was given relief. His relief driver went on to race that car until lap 176, when he crashed in Turn 1. On lap 111, Boyer took over car #15 from L. L. Corum. Boyer charged to the front of the field, and led the last 24 laps in Corum's car.

Corum and Boyer were scored as "co-winners," the first time in Indianapolis 500 history such a designation had been assigned. In three previous Indianapolis 500s (1911, 1912, 1923), a winning driver had been given relief help during the race, qualifying, starting, and finishing in the same car. 1924 was the first time one driver relieved another entirely, and had gone on to win.

== Death ==
Boyer died on September 2, 1924, from injuries sustained in a crash at Altoona Speedway in Tyrone, Pennsylvania the day before.

== Awards and honors ==
Boyer has been inducted into the following halls of fame:

- Auto Racing Hall of Fame (1985)
- Michigan Motor Sports Hall of Fame (2021)

== Motorsports career results ==
=== Indianapolis 500 results ===
Year	Car	Start	Qual	Rank	Finish	Laps	Led	Retired
1919	39	14	100.900	4	31	30	0	Rear axle
1920	6	2	96.900	2	12	192	93	Crash T3
1921	7	3	96.650	4	17	74	1	Rear axle
1923	3	13	98.800	7	18	59	0	Differential
1924	9	4	104.840	4	18	176	0	Accident
1924	15	21	93.330	16	1	91	25	Running - relief driver
Totals						622	119	

Starts	5
Poles	0
Front Row	2
Wins	1
Top 5	1
Top 10	1
Retired	4

Preceded by Tommy Milton	Indianapolis 500 Winner; 1924	Succeeded by Peter DePaolo
