= Frontenac Motor Corporation =

Defunct American motor vehicle manufacturer

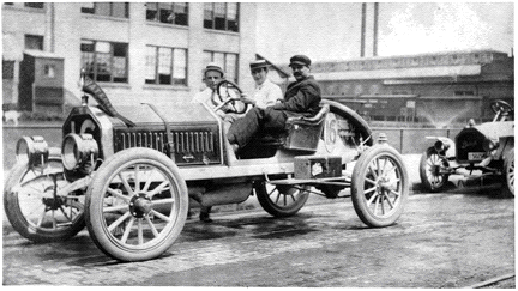
Louis Chevrolet c. 1910

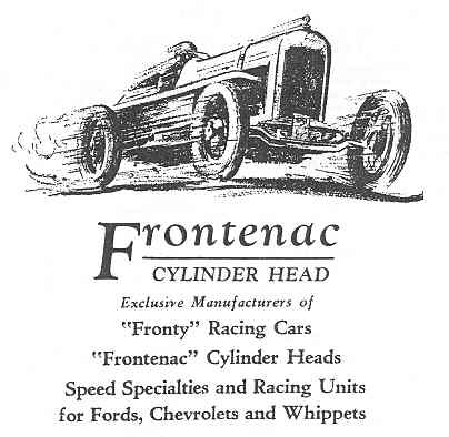
Frontenac Motors ad

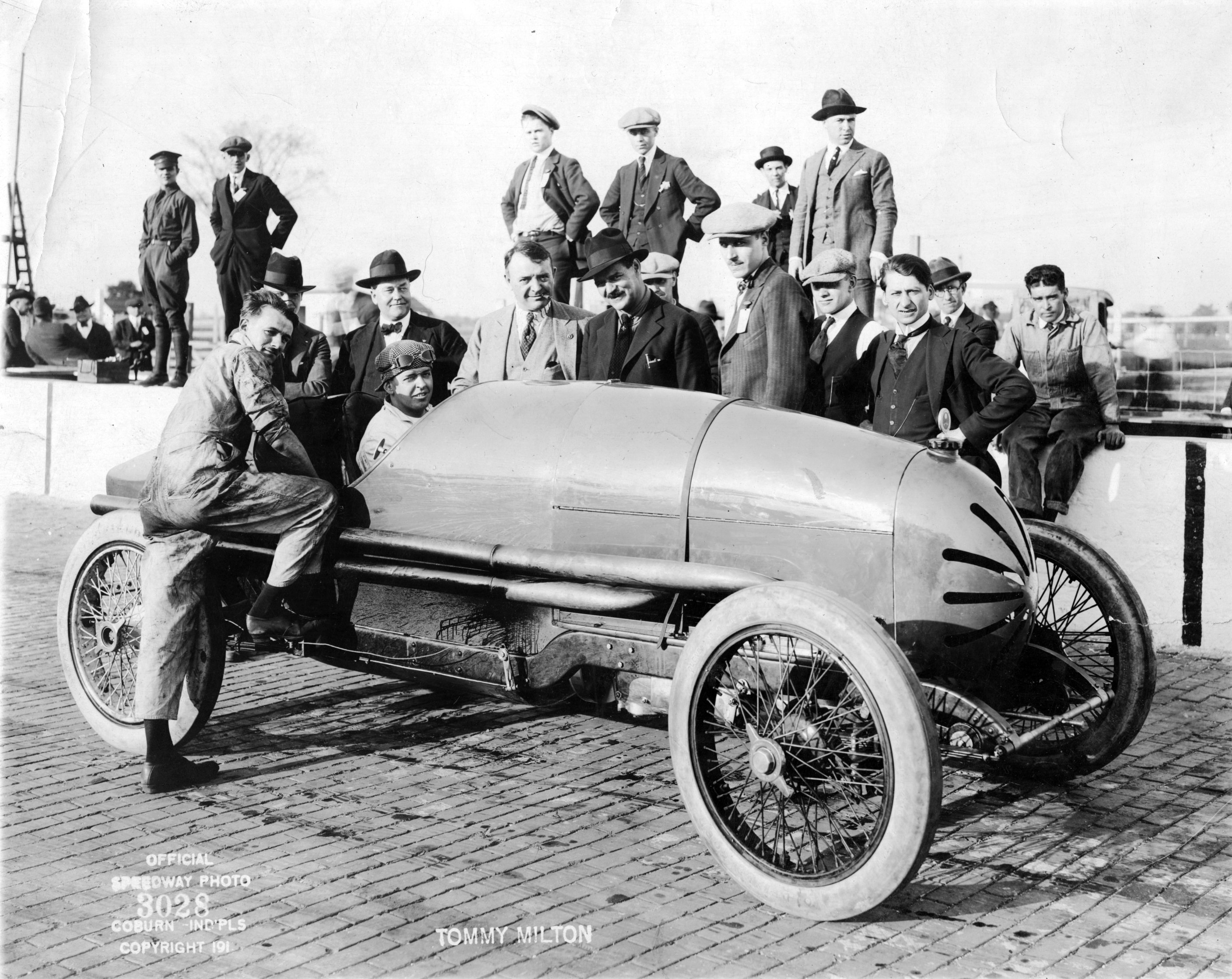
Frontenac race car before the 1921 Indianapolis 500. Driver Tommy Milton at the wheel, with Barney Oldfield and Louis Chevrolet.

Frontenac Motor Corporation was a joint venture of Louis Chevrolet, Indy 500 winner Joseph Boyer Jr., Indianapolis car dealer William Small, and Zenith Carburetor president Victor Heftler. Per articles of Incorporation on file in the Michigan State Archives, it was founded in Detroit in December 1915. The company focused on building high-performance automobiles that would be used in major AAA events, including the Indianapolis 500.

Gaston Chevrolet won the 1920 Indianapolis 500 in a Frontenac, but died a few months later in a late-season race in Los Angeles in November 1920; he had already accumulated enough points to posthumously win the championship. In 1921, Frontenac won the Indy 500 again, this time at the hands of Tommy Milton, and the company entered into a deal with Stutz Motor Company to build passenger cars. However, the deal fell through soon after, and Frontenac Motors filed bankruptcy protection in 1923.

== Other uses ==
There is a private organization of collectors of early automobiles called the Frontenac Motor Corporation which appears to have no connection to the 1915 company.
