= 1919 AAA Championship Car season =

Auto racing season

- AAA National Championship Trail

Season
- Races: 21
- Start date: March 15
- End date: October 12

Awards
- National champion: none declared
- Indianapolis 500 winner: (United States) Howdy Wilcox

The 1919 AAA Championship Car season consisted of 21 races, beginning in Santa Monica, California on March 15 and concluding in Cincinnati, Ohio on October 12. AAA did not award points towards a National Championship during the 1919 season, and did not declare a National Champion. Howdy Wilcox was the winner of the Indianapolis 500.

The de facto National Champion as polled by the American automobile journal Motor Age, was Howdy Wilcox. Wilcox was named the champion by Chris G. Sinsabaugh, an editor at Motor Age, based upon merit and on track performance. A points table was created retroactively in 1927. At a later point, it was recognized by historians that these championship results should be considered unofficial.

== Schedule and results ==
Date	Race Name Distance (miles)	Track	Location	Type	Notes	Pole position	Winning driver
March 15	Santa Monica Race (250)	Santa Monica Road Race Course	Santa Monica, California	7.36 mile road course	Walter Melcher fatally injured	Cliff Durant	Cliff Durant
March 23	All-Star Sweepstakes (150)	Ascot Speedway	South Los Angeles, California	1 mile dirt oval		Eddie Pullen	Roscoe Sarles
May 19	Victory Sweepstakes (112.5)	Uniontown Speedway	Uniontown, Pennsylvania	1.125 mile board oval			Tommy Milton
May 31	Liberty 500 Mile Sweepstakes (500)	Indianapolis Motor Speedway	Speedway, Indiana	2.5 mile brick oval	33-car field; Arthur Thurman, Louis LeCocq, and the latter's riding mechanic Robert Bandini fatally injured	René Thomas	Howdy Wilcox
June 14	International Sweepstakes Race 1 (10)	Sheepshead Bay Speedway	Sheepshead Bay, New York	2 mile board oval			Tommy Milton
June 14	International Sweepstakes Race 2 (10)	Sheepshead Bay Speedway	Sheepshead Bay, New York	2 mile board oval			Ralph Mulford
June 14	International Sweepstakes Race 3 (30)	Sheepshead Bay Speedway	Sheepshead Bay, New York	2 mile board oval			Ralph Mulford
June 14	International Sweepstakes Race Main (50)	Sheepshead Bay Speedway	Sheepshead Bay, New York	2 mile board oval			Ralph DePalma
July 4	Tacoma Race 1 (40)	Pacific Coast Speedway	Tacoma, Washington	2 mile board oval			Ralph Mulford
July 4	Tacoma Race 2 (60)	Pacific Coast Speedway	Tacoma, Washington	2 mile board oval			Louis Chevrolet
July 4	Tacoma Race 3 (80)	Pacific Coast Speedway	Tacoma, Washington	2 mile board oval			Louis Chevrolet
July 4	Independence Auto Derby (100)	Sheepshead Bay Speedway	Sheepshead Bay, New York	2 mile board oval	Emilio Jandelli, riding mechanic for Ray Howard, fatally injured in practice	Joe Thomas	Gaston Chevrolet
July 19	Uniontown Heat 1 (22.5)	Uniontown Speedway	Uniontown, Pennsylvania	1.125 mile board oval			Tommy Milton
July 19	Uniontown Heat 2 (22.5)	Uniontown Speedway	Uniontown, Pennsylvania	1.125 mile board oval			Dave Lewis
July 19	Uniontown Heat 3 (22.5)	Uniontown Speedway	Uniontown, Pennsylvania	1.125 mile board oval			I. P. Fetterman
July 19	Uniontown Heat 4 (22.5)	Uniontown Speedway	Uniontown, Pennsylvania	1.125 mile board oval			Roscoe Sarles
July 19	Uniontown Main (22.5)	Uniontown Speedway	Uniontown, Pennsylvania	1.125 mile board oval			Tommy Milton
August 23	Elgin National Trophy Race (302)	Elgin Road Race Course	Elgin, Illinois	8.384 mile road course		Ralph Mulford	Tommy Milton
September 1	3rd Annual Autumn Classic (225)	Uniontown Speedway	Uniontown, Pennsylvania	1.125 mile board oval	Joe Boyer relieved Gaston Chevrolet on lap 118.		Gaston Chevrolet/Joe Boyer
September 20	Sheepshead Bay Race 6 (150)	Sheepshead Bay Speedway	Sheepshead Bay, New York	2 mile board oval			Gaston Chevrolet
October 12	Cincinnati Race (250)	Cincinnati Motor Speedway	Sharonville, Ohio	2 mile board oval			Joe Boyer

== Leading National Championship standings ==
The points paying system for the 1909–1915 and 1917–1919 season were retroactively applied in 1927 and revised in 1951 using the points system from 1920.

#	Driver	Sponsor	Points
1	Howdy Wilcox	Peugeot	1110
2	Eddie Hearne	Duesenberg	1070
3	Gaston Chevrolet	Frontenac	980
4	Roscoe Sarles	Barney Oldfield	950
5	Tommy Milton	Duesenberg	905

== General references ==
- http://www.champcarstats.com/year/1919.htm accessed 12/1/15
