= 1925 Grand Prix season =

First AIACR World Manufacturers' Championship season

1925 AIACR World Manufacturers' Championship

Seasons
- ← none 1926 →

1925 Grand Prix season

Seasons
- ← 1924 1926 →

The 1925 Grand Prix season was the first year for the new AIACR World Manufacturers' Championship season. The championship was won by Alfa Romeo, with its P2 model.

In January, the AIACR had settled on the championship format – four Grands Prix to be held in the US, Belgium, France and Italy (of minimum 800km length), with compulsory attendance of the Italian GP and the manufacturer's home race to qualify. The best three of the four results would count. It ran on the successful 2-litre formula already in place.

This year, the Targa Florio was a competition between the French teams of Bugatti and Peugeot as the major Italian teams did not enter. In a close race, the Peugeots initially led but it was the smaller Bugatti of Bartolomeo Costantini that came through for the victory. Louis Wagner was second for Peugeot, after he was delayed when stopping to assist his teammate, Christian d'Auvergne, who had been seriously injured in an accident.

Only a small entry lined up for the Indianapolis 500, dominated by Millers. Dave Lewis ran the new Miller – the first front-wheel drive car to enter the race. The Duesenberg challenge was led by the previous year's winner Peter DePaolo. From the start the Duesenberg teammates DePaolo and Phil Shafer set the pace. Just after halfway, DePaolo pitted suffering from blistered hands, taking relief from Norman Batten while the injury was attended to. Lewis in the FWD Miller got to the lead but was reeled in by DePaolo after he had gotten back in his car. Lewis in turn was substituted by Bennett Hill who had retired earlier. Although Hill charged hard, DePaolo held on and won by almost a minute, with Shafer third. It was the first time the race had been won in under 5 hours, averaging over 100mph. Pete DePaolo would go on to win the AAA championship.

The inaugural Belgian Grand Prix had only seven entrants with only the Alfa Romeo and Delage works teams starting. Then when all four of the French cars had retired by half distance, it left just Antonio Ascari and Giuseppe Campari circulating to give Alfa Romeo a 1–2 victory. The blue riband French Grand Prix did have a more complete entry list and was held on the recently completed full circuit at Montlhéry. Once again Ascari leaped into the lead until he misjudged a corner and crashed. Seriously injured, he died on the way to the hospital. When the news was announced the rest of the Alfa Romeo team was withdrawn. After that, Robert Benoist led giving Delage a 1–2 victory and becoming the first Frenchman to win his home Grand Prix since 1913.

The Italian Grand Prix was the final race of the championship. Alfa Romeo, Delage and Duesenberg had one win apiece but Delage chose not to contest it. Duesenberg entered two cars for Tommy Milton and Pete Kreis. Indianapolis winner Pete DePaolo also came across, taking the place of Ascari in the Alfa Corse team. Bugatti entered its new 1.5-litre models. Kreis in the Duesenberg led at the start but crashed on lap 3. The Alfas then set the pace but when they pitted for fuel Milton led until he was delayed with a slow pitstop. Brilli-Peri took a comfortable win by 20 minutes from Campari, thus giving Alfa Romeo the Manufacturer's Championship.

In the middle of the year, Germany was admitted into the AIACR, allowing German teams to enter the Championship in 1926. This was the last year of the current 2-litre formula. Increased concerns about the high speeds and safety led the AIACR change the regulations the following year to the 1.5-litre voiturette class for Grand Prix racing.

== Manufacturers' World Championship ==
| Rnd | Date | Name | Circuit | Race Regulations | Weather | Race Distance | Winner's Time | Winning driver | Winning constructor | Fastest lap | Report |
|---|---|---|---|---|---|---|---|---|---|---|---|
| 1 | 30 May | (United States) XIII International 500 Mile; Sweepstakes | Indianapolis | AAA | sunny | 500 miles | 4h 57m | (United States) Pete DePaolo | Duesenberg 122 | not recorded | Report |
| 2 | 28 Jun | (Belgium) I Belgian Grand Prix; III European Grand Prix | Spa-Francorchamps | AIACR | fine | 800 km | 6h 43m | (Italy) Antonio Ascari | Alfa Romeo P2 8C/2000 | (Italy) Antonio Ascari; Alfa Romeo | Report |
| 3 | 26 Jul | (France) XIX French Grand Prix | Montlhéry | AIACR | fine then rain | 1000 km | 8h 55m | (France) Robert Benoist (France) Albert Divo | Delage 2LCV | (France) Albert Divo; Delage | Report |
| 4 | 6 Sep | (Italy) V Italian Grand Prix | Monza | AIACR; Voiturette | sunny | 800 km | 5h 15m | (Italy) Conte Gastone Brilli-Peri | Alfa Romeo P2 8C/2000 | (United States) Pete Kreis; Duesenberg | Report |

== Other races ==
Major non-championship races are in bold

| | Date | Name | Circuit | Race Regulations | Weather | Race Distance | Winner's Time | Winning driver | Winning constructor | Report |
|---|---|---|---|---|---|---|---|---|---|---|
| A | **22 Feb** | (Italy) **I Premio Reale di Roma** | Monte Mario | Formula Libre; Voiturette | fine | 425 km | 4h 21m | (Italy) Carlo Masetti | Bugatti Type 35 | Report |
| | 8 Mar | (France) I Grand Prix de Provence | Miramas | Formula Libre | cloudy | 500 km | 3h 59m | (United Kingdom) Henry Segrave | Talbot 70 | Report |
| | 18 Apr | (Italy) I Gran Premio di Tripoli | Tripoli | Formula Libre | sunny | 210 km | 2h 15m | (Italy) Renato Balestrero | OM 665 S | Report |
| | 26 Apr | (Italy) II Circuito di Alessandria | Alessandria | Formula Libre | brief rain | 255 km | 3h 11m | (Italy) Massimo Degiovannini | Bugatti Type 22 | Report |
| B | **3 May** | (Italy) **VIII Coppa Florio** | Medio Madonie | Targa Florio | hot | 432 km | 6h 04m | (France) André Boillot | Peugeot 174 S | Report |
| B | **3 May** | (Italy) **XVI Targa Florio** (Note: The Targa Florio and the Coppa Florio were run simultaneously over the same route. The Targa Florio comprised four laps of the 108 km route for a total of 432 km, and the Coppa Florio added a fifth lap, for a total of 540 km. It was possible to win one and not the other.) | Medio Madonie | Targa Florio | hot | 540 km | 7h 32m | (Italy) Meo Constantini | Bugatti Type 35 | Report |
| | 17 May | (France) II Grand Prix de l’Ouverture | Montlhéry | Voiturette | fine then rain | 500 km | 3h 12m | (United Kingdom) George Duller | Talbot 70 | Report |
| | 17 May | (Germany) I Solituderennen | Solitude | Formula Libre | sunny | 225 km | 2h 48m | (Germany) Otto Merz | Mercedes M72/94 PP TF | Report |
| | 21 May | (Italy) III Circuito di Savio | Ravenna | Formula Libre | sunny | 300 km | 2h 48m | (Italy) Emilio Materassi | Itala Special 5.8L | Report |
| | 24 May | (Italy) II Coppa della Perugina | Perugia | Formula Libre | brief rain | 300 km | 2h 46m | (Italy) Conte Gastone Brilli-Peri | Ballot Indianapolis 1919 | Report |
| | 31 May | (Italy) VI Circuito di Mugello | Mugello | Formula Libre | hot | 360 km | 5h 13m | (Italy) Emilio Materassi | Itala Special 5.8L | Report |
| | 31 May | (Italy) I Coppa Etna | Gelso Bianco | Formula Libre | sunny | 250 km | 2h 51m | (Italy) Costantino Magistri | Bugatti Type 13 | Report |
| | 19 Jun | (Germany) IV Eifelrennen | Nideggen | Formula Libre; Voiturette | rain | 500 km | 6h 55m | (Italy) Vittorio Rosa | Alfa Romeo RL SS | Report |
| | 21 Jun | (Italy) II Coppa Acerbo | Pescara | Formula Libre | hot | 510 km | 5h 28m | (Italy) Guido Ginaldi | Alfa Romeo RL TF | Report |
| | 5 Jul | (Italy) I Coppa Vinci | Messina | Formula Libre | sunny | 260 km | 3h 43m | (Italy) Renato Balestrero | OM 665 S | Report |
| | 2 Aug | (France) I Grand Prix de la Marne | Beine-Nauroy | Formula Libre | ? | 220 km | 2h 09m | (France) Pierre Clause | Bignan | Report |
| | 16 Aug | (Italy) V Coppa Montenero | Montenero | Formula Libre | hot | 225 km | 3h 17m | (Italy) Emilio Materassi | Itala Special | Report |
| | 29 Aug | (France) V Grand Prix de Boulogne | Boulogne-sur-Mer | Voiturette | ? | 450 km | 4h 20m | (United Kingdom) Bunny Marshall | Bugatti Type 22 | Report |
| | 6 Sep | (France) I Grand Prix du Comminges | Saint-Gaudens | Formula Libre | ? | 390 km | 4h 49m | (France) Goury | Bignan B | Report |
| C | **19 Sep** | (Spain) III **Gran Premio de San Sebastián** | Lasarte | AIACR | hot | 710 km | 5h 45m | (France) Albert Divo (France) André Morel | Delage 2LCV | Report |
| | 29 Sep | (United Kingdom) V Junior Car Club 200 | Brooklands | Voiturette; Cyclecar | ? | 200 miles | 2h 35m | (United Kingdom) Henry Segrave | Talbot-Darracq 70 | Report |
| | 18 Oct | (Italy) V Circuito del Garda | Salò | Formula Libre | sunny | 250 km | 2h 56m | (Italy) Conte Aymo Maggi | Bugatti Type 35 | Report |
| | 22 Nov | (Italy) I Apuano Circuit | Carrara | Formula Libre | ? | 160 km | 1h 58m | (Italy) Renato Balestrero | OM 665 S | Report |

== Teams and drivers ==
| Entrant | Constructor | Chassis | Engine | Tyre | Driver | Rounds |
|---|---|---|---|---|---|---|
| (Italy) Alfa Corse | Alfa Romeo | RL Targa Florio; P2 8C/2000 | Alfa Romeo 3.0L S6; Alfa Romeo 2.0L S8 s/c | | (Italy) Antonio Ascari | 2, 3; A |
| (Italy) Alfa Corse | Alfa Romeo | RL Targa Florio; P2 8C/2000 | Alfa Romeo 3.0L S6; Alfa Romeo 2.0L S8 s/c | | (Italy) Giuseppe Campari | 2, 3, 4 |
| (Italy) Alfa Corse | Alfa Romeo | RL Targa Florio; P2 8C/2000 | Alfa Romeo 3.0L S6; Alfa Romeo 2.0L S8 s/c | | (Italy) Conte Gastone Brilli-Peri | 2, 3, 4 |
| (Italy) Alfa Corse | Alfa Romeo | RL Targa Florio; P2 8C/2000 | Alfa Romeo 3.0L S6; Alfa Romeo 2.0L S8 s/c | | (United States) Peter DePaolo | 4 |
| (Italy) Alfa Corse | Alfa Romeo | RL Targa Florio; P2 8C/2000 | Alfa Romeo 3.0L S6; Alfa Romeo 2.0L S8 s/c | | (Italy) Giovanni Minozzi | 4* |
| (United States) Duesenberg Bros | Duesenberg | Type 122 | Duesenberg 2.0L S8 s/c | F | (United States) Peter DePaolo | 1 |
| (United States) Duesenberg Bros | Duesenberg | Type 122 | Duesenberg 2.0L S8 s/c | F | (United States) Phil Shafer | 1 |
| (United States) Duesenberg Bros | Duesenberg | Type 122 | Duesenberg 2.0L S8 s/c | F | (United States) Pete Kreis | 1, 4 |
| (United States) Duesenberg Bros | Duesenberg | Type 122 | Duesenberg 2.0L S8 s/c | F | (United States) Wade Morton | 1 |
| (United States) Duesenberg Bros | Duesenberg | Type 122 | Duesenberg 2.0L S8 s/c | F | (United States) Norman Batten | 1* |
| (United States) Duesenberg Bros | Duesenberg | Type 122 | Duesenberg 2.0L S8 s/c | F | (United States) Jimmy Gleason | 1* |
| (United States) Miller Automobiles | Miller | Type 122 | Miller 2.0L S8 s/c | F | (United States) Bennett Hill | 1 |
| (United States) Miller Automobiles | Miller | Type 122 | Miller 2.0L S8 s/c | F | (United States) Jules Ellingboe | 1 |
| (United States) Cliff Durant | Miller | Junior 8 Type 122 | Miller 2.0L S8 s/c Miller 2.0L S8 s/c | F | (United States) Dave Lewis | 1 |
| (United States) Cliff Durant | Miller | Junior 8 Type 122 | Miller 2.0L S8 s/c Miller 2.0L S8 s/c | F | (United States) Earl Cooper | 1 |
| (United States) Harry Hartz | Miller | Type 122 | Miller 2.0L S8 s/c | F | (United States) Harry Hartz | 1 |
| (United States) Harry Hartz | Miller | Type 122 | Miller 2.0L S8 s/c | F | (United States) Fred Comer | 1 |
| (United States) Harry Hartz | Miller | Type 122 | Miller 2.0L S8 s/c | F | (United States) “Leon Duray” | 1 |
| (United States) Harry Hartz | Miller | Type 122 | Miller 2.0L S8 s/c | F | (United States) Ira Vail | 1 |
| (United States) Tommy Milton | Miller Duesenberg | Type 122; Type 122 | Miller 2.0L S8 s/c Duesenberg 2.0L S8 s/c | F | (United States) Tommy Milton | 1, 4 |
| (United States) Tommy Milton | Miller Duesenberg | Type 122; Type 122 | Miller 2.0L S8 s/c Duesenberg 2.0L S8 s/c | F | (United States) Bob McDonogh | 1 |
| (France) Usines Bugatti | Bugatti | Type 35; Type 39; Type 37 | Bugatti 2.0L S8; Bugatti 1.5L S8 s/c Bugatti 1.5L S4 | | (Italy) Meo Constantini | [2], 3, 4; B, C |
| (France) Usines Bugatti | Bugatti | Type 35; Type 39; Type 37 | Bugatti 2.0L S8; Bugatti 1.5L S8 s/c Bugatti 1.5L S4 | | (Spain) Pierre de Vizcaya | [2], 3, 4; B, C |
| (France) Usines Bugatti | Bugatti | Type 35; Type 39; Type 37 | Bugatti 2.0L S8; Bugatti 1.5L S8 s/c Bugatti 1.5L S4 | | (Spain) Ferdinand de Vizcaya | 3, 4; B, C |
| (France) Usines Bugatti | Bugatti | Type 35; Type 39; Type 37 | Bugatti 2.0L S8; Bugatti 1.5L S8 s/c Bugatti 1.5L S4 | | (France) Jules Goux | 3, 4 |
| (France) Usines Bugatti | Bugatti | Type 35; Type 39; Type 37 | Bugatti 2.0L S8; Bugatti 1.5L S8 s/c Bugatti 1.5L S4 | | (Italy) Giulio Foresti | 4 |
| (France) Automobiles Delage | Delage | Delage 2LCV | Delage 2.0L V12 s/c | | (France) Albert Divo | 2, 3, [4]; C |
| (France) Automobiles Delage | Delage | Delage 2LCV | Delage 2.0L V12 s/c | | (France) Robert Benoist | 2, 3, [4]; C |
| (France) Automobiles Delage | Delage | Delage 2LCV | Delage 2.0L V12 s/c | | (France) René Thomas | 2, [4]; C |
| (France) Automobiles Delage | Delage | Delage 2LCV | Delage 2.0L V12 s/c | | (France) Paul Torchy | 2, 3*, [4]; C |
| (France) Automobiles Delage | Delage | Delage 2LCV | Delage 2.0L V12 s/c | | (France) Louis Wagner | 3 |
| (France) Automobiles Delage | Delage | Delage 2LCV | Delage 2.0L V12 s/c | | (France) André Morel | C* |
| (United Kingdom) STD Motors Ltd (France) | Sunbeam | GP | Sunbeam 2.0L S4 s/c | | (United Kingdom) Henry Segrave | [2], 3; [C] |
| (United Kingdom) STD Motors Ltd (France) | Sunbeam | GP | Sunbeam 2.0L S4 s/c | | (Italy) Conte Giulio Masetti | [2], 3; C |
| (United Kingdom) STD Motors Ltd (France) | Sunbeam | GP | Sunbeam 2.0L S4 s/c | | (Italy) Caberto Conelli | [2], 3; [C] |
| (Italy) SA Autocontruzioni; Diatto | Diatto | 20S | Diatto 2.0L S4 s/c | | (Italy) Alfieri Maserati | 4; [C] |
| (Italy) SA Autocontruzioni; Diatto | Diatto | 20S | Diatto 2.0L S4 s/c | | (Italy) Emilio Materassi | 4; [C] |
| (Italy) Officine Meccaniche | O.M. | Tipo 665 S | O.M. 2.0L S6 | | (Italy) Renato Balestrero | A, B |
| (Italy) Officine Meccaniche | O.M. | Tipo 665 S | O.M. 2.0L S6 | | (Italy) Giuseppe Morandi | A |
| (Italy) Officine Meccaniche | O.M. | Tipo 665 S | O.M. 2.0L S6 | | (Italy) Archimede Rosa | A |
| (Italy) Fab. Torinese Velivoli; Chiribiri & Cie | Chiribiri | 12/16 | Chiribiri 1.5L S4 | | (Italy) Luigi Platé | 4; A |
| (Italy) Fab. Torinese Velivoli; Chiribiri & Cie | Chiribiri | 12/16 | Chiribiri 1.5L S4 | | (Italy) ? . Santoleri | 4 |
| (Italy) Fab. Torinese Velivoli; Chiribiri & Cie | Chiribiri | 12/16 | Chiribiri 1.5L S4 | | (Italy) ? “Nino” | A |
| (France) SA des Autos et Cycles Peugeot | Peugeot | Type 174 Sport | Peugeot 3.8L S4 | | (France) André Boillot | B |
| (France) SA des Autos et Cycles Peugeot | Peugeot | Type 174 Sport | Peugeot 3.8L S4 | | (France) Louis Wagner | B |
| (France) SA des Autos et Cycles Peugeot | Peugeot | Type 174 Sport | Peugeot 3.8L S4 | | (France) Louis Rigal | B |
| (France) SA des Autos et Cycles Peugeot | Peugeot | Type 174 Sport | Peugeot 3.8L S4 | | (France) Christian d'Auvergne | B |
| (Italy) SA Automobiles; Eduardo Bianchi | Bianchi | 18 | Bianchi 2L | | (Italy) Luigi Lopez | [B] |
| (Czech Republic) Tatra-Werke AG | Tatra | 12 | Tatra 1.1L F2 | | (Italy) Alfieri Maserati | B |
| (Czech Republic) Tatra-Werke AG | Tatra | 12 | Tatra 1.1L F2 | | (Italy) Emilio Materassi | B |

=== Significant Privateer drivers ===
| Entrant | Constructor | Chassis | Engine | Tyre | Driver | Rounds |
|---|---|---|---|---|---|---|
| Private Entrant | Fiat | 805/405 | Fiat 2.0L S8 s/c | F | (Italy) Pietro Bordino | 1 |
| Private Entrant | Miller | Type 122 | Miller 2.0L S8 s/c | F | (United States) Ralph DePalma | 1 |
| Private Entrant | Eldridge | Special | Anzani 1.5L S4 | | (United Kingdom) Ernest Eldridge | [3], 4 |
| Private Entrant | Guyot | Spéciale | Schmid 2.0L S6 sleeve-valve supercharged | | (France) Albert Guyot | 4 |
| Private Entrant | Alfa Romeo | RL Targa Florio | Alfa Romeo 3.0L S6 | | (Italy) Guido Ginaldi | A, B |
| Private Entrant | Bugatti | Type 35 | Bugatti 2.0L S8 | | (Italy) Conte Carlo Masetti | A |

Note: * was raced as a relief driver. Those in brackets show, although entered, the driver did not race

== Regulations and technical ==
The AIACR (forerunner of the FIA) 2-litre regulations for Grand Prix races remained unchanged. In the United States, the American Automobile Association (AAA) stayed with the same regulations as well. The AIACR followed the American example to remove the mandatory mechanic on board, replacing him with a compulsory rear-view mirror instead. As the circuits used became shorter, as well as the danger to the passenger, the mechanic had become superfluous. Incongruously, the cars still had to be 2-seaters.

The Targa Florio regulations remained open to any sized cars. The smallest engine classes were merged up to 1.1-litres and only ran three laps. Each car had a minimum weight of 120kg and, unlike other regulations, had to have a driver and a mechanic (who was not permitted to drive). The crew was allowed to be swapped at the end of a lap with a pre-registered substitute crew. With a maximum time limit of 10 hours, each entry had to finish within an hour of the class winner to be classified. The Targa Florio and Coppa Florio were held simultaneously, with the Coppa was held over just four laps, with teams paying extra to enter both races. The Coppa Ciano was only open to factory entries who had registered. The two smaller classes – to 1.1-litre and to 1.5-litre only ran 3 laps.

=== The World Championship ===
As early as the October 1923 meeting of the AIACR, there were discussions about holding an international championship. The initial ideas were for a European competition including grand prix, touring car and endurance events but there were concerns about achieving a balance of performance.

At the January 1925 meeting, the Automobile Club of Italy gave its proposal to the committee – for an ongoing international series through to 1930. The 1925 season would comprise the existing Grand Prix of Italy, France and Indianapolis as well as new Grand Prix for Spain, Belgium and Great Britain. The committee voted to omit the Spanish GP, and Brooklands had to cancel the British race because of legal action with neighbours about noise complaints. Each race had to be at least 800km long and run to the existing 2-litre formula. Cars had a minimum empty weight of 650kg and be a 2-seater with a minimum width of 80cm. Following the death of Kenelm Lee Guinness's riding mechanic during the 1924 Spanish Grand Prix, riding mechanics were banned and a rear-view mirror was made compulsory.

The championship was for manufacturers, not individual drivers, and to be eligible teams had to enter the Italian GP, as well their own national GP if available. They would only score points from their best three results of the four races. The winning manufacturer would receive FF70000 cash prize as well as a FF30000 bronze and gold trophy designed by Italian sculptor Antonio Maraini.

Only the best-finishing car for each manufacturer would score points, which were awarded as follows:

| Position | Points |
|---|---|
| 1st place | 1 |
| 2nd place | 2 |
| 3rd place | 3 |
| All other finishers | 4 |
| All non-finishers | 5 |
| Not starting | 6 |

And in the case of a tie, a 200km race-off would be held at Monza within 2 days of the Italian GP. At the February meeting the committee ratified the proposal. They also voted to exclude German teams from the Championship, as Germany was not a member of the AIACR, and they were still not permitted to officially race in France, Great Britain or Belgium.

Note: Information is limited as the AIACR did not release official notices or confirm the results. Etzrodt has pieced together information from contemporary magazines. For example, it is unclear whether only works teams scored points or privateers could score for the manufacturer. Likewise, it was not stipulated whether racing specials based on a given chassis would score separately (for example the various Miller specials that were popular in the USA).

=== Technical innovation ===
Fiat and Rolland Pilain had retired from motor-racing. Alfa Romeo had dominated the previous year with their P2 model. Between seasons, chief engineer Vittorio Jano further developed the engine, boosting its output from 145 up to 155 bhp. With new fuel for the year, an additional forward fuel tank was fitted for the higher consumption, as were larger drum brakes.

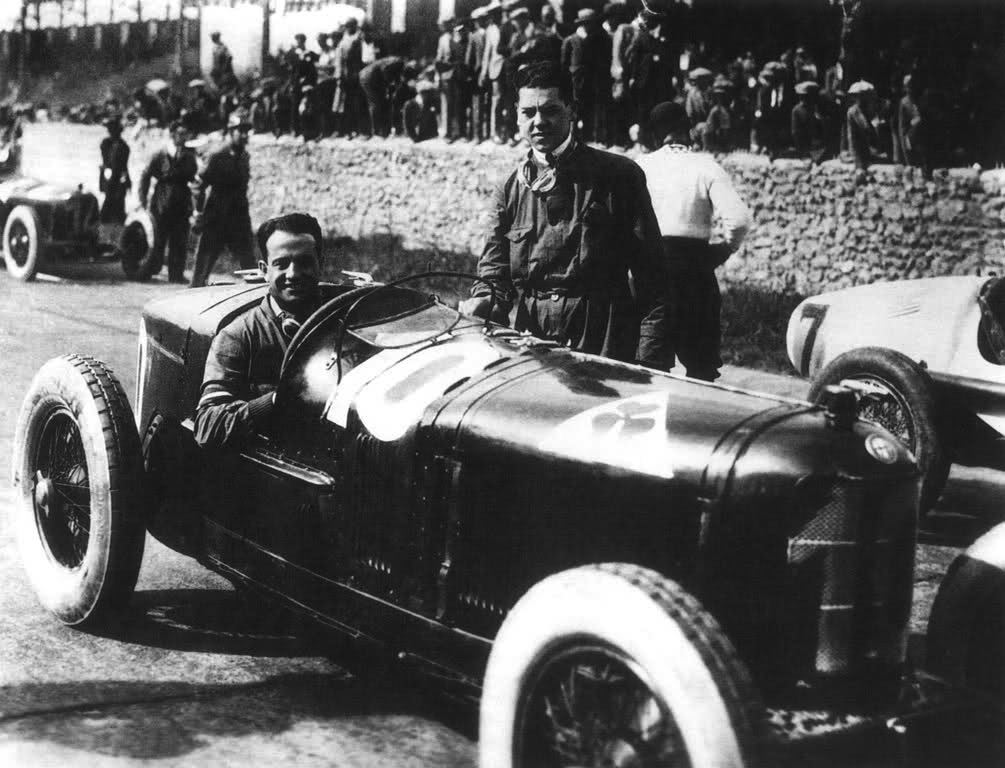
Italian GP: Pete DePaolo and mechanic Ramponi, Alfa Romeo P2

Delage joined the other top manufacturers by supercharging their 2-litre V12 engine. They chose to use twin Roots-style superchargers. The power output was 190bhp, closing in on the “magical” 100bhp per litre milestone. However, despite a 5-speed gearbox, the chassis was still not capable of transferring all the power to the road. The bonnet was now louvered to try and dissipate the great amount of heat generated by the engine. With riding mechanics now banned, Sunbeam fitted their cars with a fuel pump to maintain fuel pressure, which was a role the mechanic used to do.

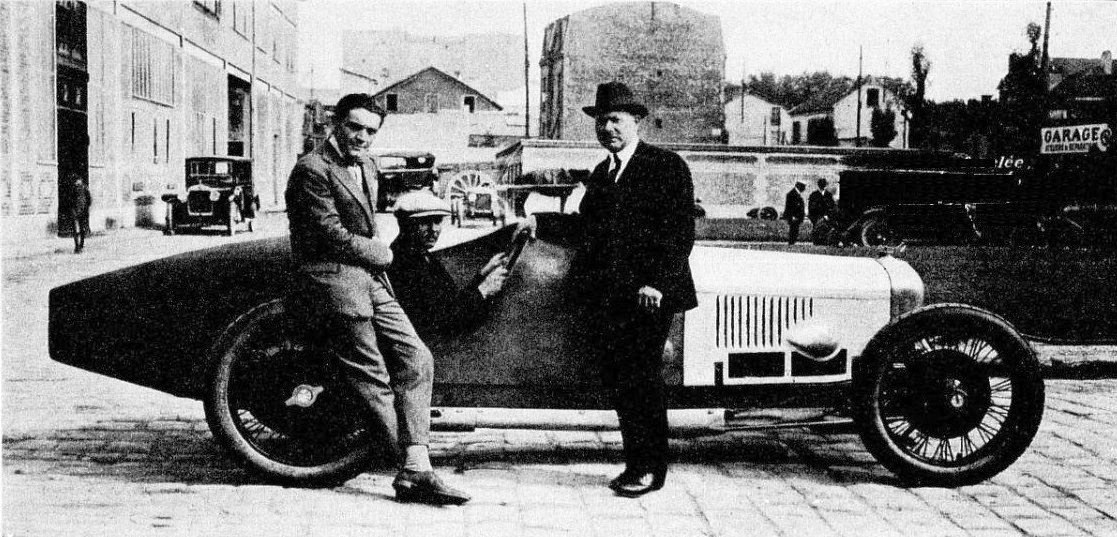
The Delage team of Benoist, Divo and Thomas (team manager)

There were also several specials entered in Grand Prix. Albert Guyot had been a regular driver for Rolland-Pilain who had also raced at the Indianapolis race since before the war. He took three of the Rolland-Pilain cars, adding a Cozette supercharger to a new Burt-McCollum sleeve-valve engine. English driver Ernest Eldridge took an Amilcar GS and fitted a 1.5-litre supercharged Anzani side-valve engine that got up to 185 km/h.

After the 1924 Indianapolis race, Jimmy Murphy had suggested to Harry Miller that a lower centre-of-gravity would increase cornering speeds. That could be achieved with front-wheel drive obviating the need for a central driveshaft. Miller started work on it but, sadly Murphy was killed later in the year. The Miller FWD had a supercharger giving out 200 bhp. He also supplied supercharger kits to his customers that they could retrofit to their cars, which many did.

The Duesenberg had a vanes-type compressor, that could rev at up to 30000 rpm, far higher than the Roots supercharger. This format gave them better performance at low speeds. The wider wheelbase also gave greater cornering stability.

| Manufacturer | Model | Engine | Power Output | Max. Speed (km/h) | Dry Weight (kg) |
|---|---|---|---|---|---|
| (Italy) Alfa Romeo | P2 8C/2000 | Alfa Romeo 1987cc S8 supercharged | 155 bhp | 240 | 750 |
| (France) Bugatti | Type 35 | Bugatti 1991cc S8 | 90 bhp | 180 | 750 |
| (France) Delage | 2LCV | Delage 1983cc V12 supercharged | 190 bhp | 215 | 1065 |
| (United Kingdom) Sunbeam | GP | Sunbeam 1988cc S4 supercharged | 138 bhp | 200 | 680 |
| (United States) Duesenberg | Type 122 | Duesenberg 1984cc S8 supercharged | 150 bhp | | |
| (United States) Miller | 122 FWD | Miller 1977cc S8 supercharged | 200 bhp | | |
| (Italy) Diatto | GP | Diatto 1982cc S8 supercharged | 130 bhp | 175 | 700 |
| (Italy) Chiribiri | Monza | Chiribiri 1453cc S4 supercharged | 95 bhp | 165 | |
| (Germany) Mercedes | M218 | Mercedes 1980cc S8 supercharged | 170 bhp | 210 | 660 |
| (France) Guyot | Spéciale | Schmid 1984cc S6 sleeve-valve supercharged | 125 bhp | 193 | 690 |
| (France) Peugeot | 174 S | Peugeot 3990cc S4 | 100 bhp | 190 | 960 |

The first Grand Prix was held in Belgium at the Spa-Francorchamps. Originally opened in 1921, it was a roughly triangular track with similar elevation changes to the French circuit at Lyon. Right on the frontier, the Malmedy corner was in former German territory. Grand prix racing also extended across the Mediterranean to Libya. Intended to increase tourism and prospective immigrants, an event was organised in the Italian province of Tripolitania. The previous year, Casablanca had hosted a race for touring cars. This event was held on a 70km road circuit heading out from the south of Tripoli, the provincial capital.

== Season review ==
This year the season opener was a new event, the Grand Prix of Rome, held in February. The race was run on a 10.6km circuit on the streets of Rome north of the Vatican City. A big field of 35 starters lined up for an overall prize of 100000 lire. Predominantly Italians, a number of top drivers entered including Conte Gastone Brilli-Peri in a Ballot designed for the 1919 Indianapolis race, Emilio Materassi with his pair of his modified Itala Specials and Conte Carlo Masetti in a Bugatti 35. He was the older brother of Giulio Masetti, the famous double-winner of the Targa Florio. The only foreign driver was Christian Werner, who was driving as a privateer; in the Mercedes with which he had won the 1924 Targa Florio. Brilli Peri led initially but retired with a broken gearbox, and Werner crashed and had to retire. Antonio Ascari, who had replaced Giovanni Minozzi in his Alfa Romeo, crashed heavily on the steep downhill section while overtaking Conte Aymo Maggi in a smaller car. Fortunately, despite bowling two telephone poles, both emerged unscathed. Masetti won by nearly half an hour from Materassi, giving Bugatti its first win in Italy at its first attempt.

The first event in Africa for grand prix cars had an inauspicious start. The boat bringing the small-engine cars from Italy mistakenly offloaded them in Benghazi, so their race was delayed by two days. This left a small field of five in the over 2-litre class in their own race on the Thursday. Then on Saturday the ten smaller cars had their race. Renato Balestrero, works driver for OM won from Luigi Platé, who drove his Chiribiri with his wife as the co-driver.

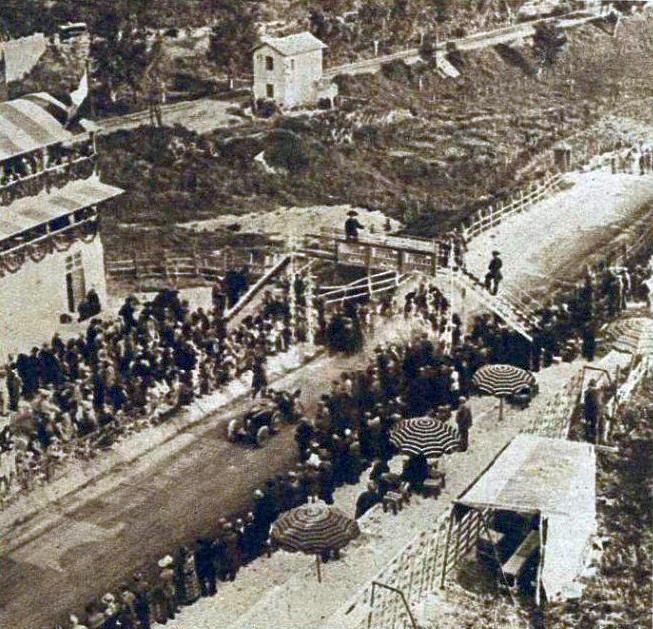
Start/Finish line at the Targa Florio, beside Cerda railway station

The Bugatti team returned to Italy for the Targa Florio. Once again, the event was run in conjunction with the Coppa Florio, with that being based on the results of the event's first four laps of the newly sealed Madonie circuit. In 1924, the grandstands had been destroyed by a fire but within a year they had been rebuilt. Whereas in 1924 the German teams arrived in force, this year it was the French. Bugatti had a three-car team with Bartolomeo Costantini and the Spanish de Vizcaya brothers, Pierre and Ferdinand. Peugeot returned with four of their Type 174 sports cars with André Boillot, Louis Wagner, Victor Rigal and Christian d'Auvergne as the drivers. None of the Italian works teams turned up, with the small field filled out by privateers. The field started at 4-minute intervals with the Peugeots, as the only entrants in the Coppa Florio, going out first. They set the early pace with Boillot setting a new lap record on the first circuit (assisted by the better quality roads). Going into the third lap, now led by Wagner they were running 1-2-3 with Costantini three minutes behind. However, d'Auvergne missed a corner, hit a wall and rolled. His mechanic was thrown clear while d'Auvergne lay pinned under the burning car. Wagner, following a few minutes behind, stopped and together with the mechanic pulled his badly injured teammate from the wreck before re-joining the race. Costantini meanwhile was picking up his pace and was ahead on elapsed time by the end of the third lap. He drove a smooth incident-free run, putting in the fastest lap of the race on his final lap to beat the Peugeots of Wagner and Boillot, to win the Targa. By dint of Peugeot being the only team to register for the Coppa, André Boillot won that prize. Along with their 1922 victory, Peugeot became the first two-time winners and were awarded the Coppa Florio, but decided to put it up for competition again.

The Grand Prix d’Ouverture heralded the official opening for racing at the completed Autodrome de Linas-Montlhéry outside of Paris. Held on the oval circuit, it was restricted to voiturettes up to 1.5-litres with 150000 francs in prizes. A big field was therefore expected but this waned when the works teams from Bugatti and Chiribiri withdrew. This left the Talbot team as the overwhelming favourites, with Henry Segrave, George Duller and Conte Caberto Conelli. They were joined by racing specials from J. G. Parry-Thomas and Ernest Eldridge. Against them were teams from some of the many small French manufacturers springing up: La Perle, Bucciali, Jean Gras and Salmson. A pedestrian race ended in rain with the expected 1-2-3 result for the Talbots led by Duller, 20 laps ahead of Eldridge. Conelli had been racing hard to catch Duller and as the latter eased off to take the flag Conelli clipped his car, rolled and skated past the line– perhaps the only driver to get a podium after finishing a race upside down.

One of the smallest entry lists for the Indianapolis 500 was once again dominated by the Miller 122, in various guises, with 16 of the 22 starters. Harry Miller had developed his front-wheel drive model, which Cliff Durant entered as a “Junior-8” for Dave Lewis – the first front-wheel drive car to be at the race. He also ran a standard Miller for teammate Earl Cooper. Miller's own team driver, Bennett Hill, tested the car but preferred to race the older, rear-wheel drive version with a supercharger instead. Harry Hartz also ran supercharged Millers for himself, Fred Comer and Leon Duray, as did previous race-winners Tommy Milton and Ralph DePalma.

Up against the Millers was Fred Duesenberg's cars. The four supercharged 122s were led by the previous year's winner Peter DePaolo in what he called his “Banana Wagon”. Circuit director Pop Meyers had travelled to Europe to encourage their teams to come to the race, but they all refused. FIAT driver Pietro Bordino had been racing his 805 in the USA since the previous year and entered his car as a privateer. After over a decade, the brick surface was becoming increasingly rough. Instead of the usual straight-sided high-pressure tyres, Firestone decided to supply the teams with balloon-style, low-pressure tyres for the first time.

Although nominally the first round of the new Championship, the American cars did not technically meet the AIACR regulations. They had 122 cubic inch (2-litre) engines, but the chassis were narrow single-seaters less than 80cm wide. This year the AAA lifted the qualifying speed to an average of 85mph – or 7m 30s over a 4-lap, 10-mile run. Duray set a new lap record of 113.2mph to get pole position. Second fastest was DePaolo and his Duesenberg with Duray's team-leader Hartz completing the front row. Last year's co-winner, L.L. Corum, crashed his car in Friday practise and would not be a starter, becoming a relief driver for DePaolo instead.

Race day was sunny and warm, and 145000 spectators arrived. DePaolo took the lead from the start, and after 100 miles was just ahead of the veterans Cooper and Hartz, with less than 30 seconds covering the top five. Bordino was an early stop at the pits, losing two laps to change spark plugs. At quarter distance, DePaolo's teammate, rookie Phil Shafer (who had been the final qualifier, starting at the back) had moved up to second and the pair duelled for the lead for the next eighty miles.

Many of the drivers were being shaken up and exhausted by the rough surface and a number of relief drivers were employed. Bordino stopped again, with an injured hand and while he went to the track hospital Antoine Mourre took over the Fiat. Soon after Herb Jones's Miller crashed into the wall and caught fire. Jones was also taken to the track hospital with injuries. Just after halfway, DePaolo pitted suffering from blistered hands and took relief from Norman Batten as the blisters were attended to. As the pitstops worked through, this soon put Cooper into the lead until a puncture nudged him into the wall and he had to pit. DePaolo had got back into his car again on lap 127 and, running fourth, set off after the leaders. Lewis, in the Miller FD, ran at the front but in ten laps was hauled in and passed by DePaolo. An exhausted Lewis finally pitted to be relieved by Bennett Hill who had retired early with suspension issues. Although Hill charged hard, DePaolo held on and won by almost a minute, or half a lap, from Hill, with Shafer third. It was the first time the race had been won in under 5 hours, averaging 101.3mph. With four other wins in the 11-race season, Pete DePaolo would, in 1927, be retroactively declared the year's AAA champion, well ahead of Tommy Milton. The end of the year saw the retirement of Milton and DePalma, two of America's greatest post-war drivers.

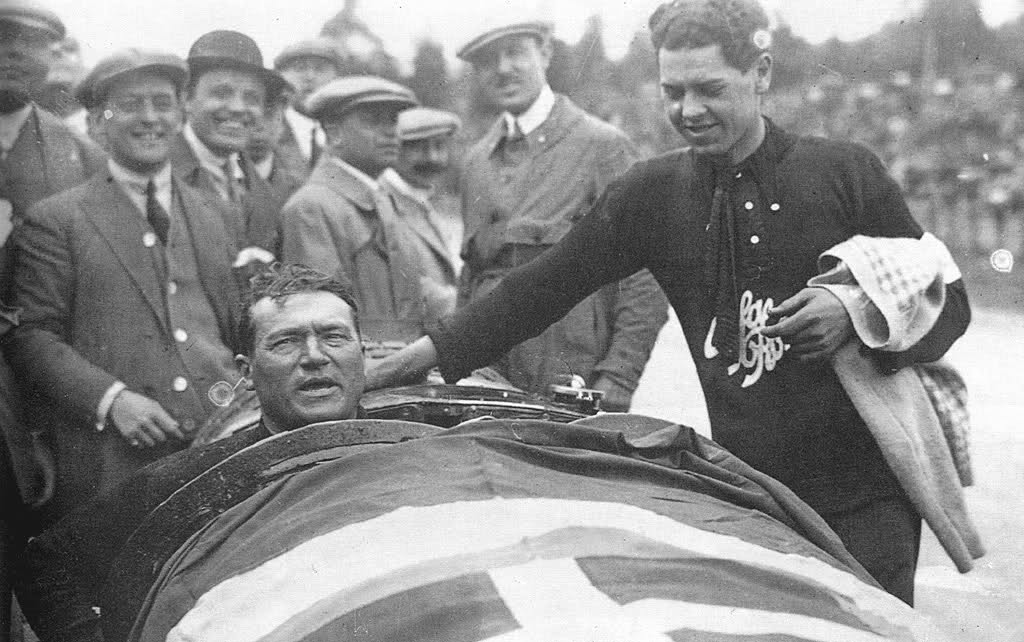
Ascari, winner of the Belgian GP, with Alfa mechanic Ramponi

The third European Grand Prix turned out to be a major anti-climax. It was the inaugural Belgian Grand Prix and part of the World Championship, but only the Alfa Romeo and Delage works teams arrived. Sunbeam claimed its cars were not ready, as did Alfred Guyot. Alfa Corse had Antonio Ascari, Giuseppe Campari and Gastone Brilli-Peri as their drivers, with the latter running an older, 1924, model. The four Delages (driven by team manager René Thomas, Albert Divo, Robert Benoist and Paul Torchy) were now fitted with twin superchargers. In practice the two teams had similar lap times, although grid positions were still drawn by lot unlike Indianapolis. From the start, Ascari took off with a big lead over his teammates Campari and Brilli-Peri. The Delages had an abysmal time and all failed during the race. Benoist pulled into the pits on just the second lap with a cracked fuel-tank. Thomas' car caught fire and even though Divo kept up with the Alfas, the strain burnt out the supercharger. Just after halfway through the race there were only the Alfas of Ascari and Campari left. An apocryphal story has risen about the race: The partisan Belgian crowd were very disappointed and booed the Italian team. In response, team manager Vittorio Jano called his drivers in to stop for a lunchbreak. However, this is refuted by Etzrodt who says it was just a methodical pit-stop to change all four tyres on both cars. They then went back out to complete a farcical 1–2 victory.

The next round of the championship, the French Grand Prix, was held at the new track at Montlhéry. Now completed with its road section to complement the banked oval, it was the first French GP not held on a public-road circuit. This time all the main protagonists turned up: Alfa Corse returned with their three cars and drivers. This time Delage had just three cars, with Thomas' destroyed, and Louis Wagner brought in to join Divo and Benoist. Thomas apparently had been fired as team chief for taking money for deficient connecting rods. There were three works Bugattis for “Meo” Costantini, Pierre de Vizcaya and veteran Jules Goux, along with two privateer entries for Pierre's brother Ferdinand and Giulio Foresti. Finally, the Sunbeam team arrived from Britain with three cars for Henry Segrave and the Italian counts Giulio Masetti and Caberto Conelli.

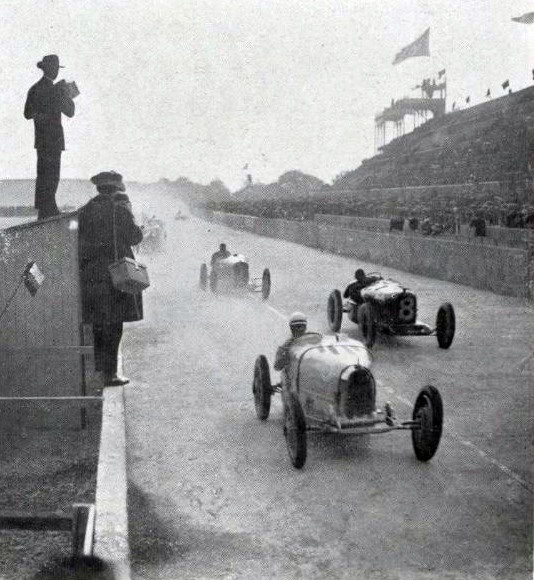
French GP: de Vizcaya (Bugatti) ahead of Ascari (Alfa Romeo)

After a confused rolling-start, it was Ascari who led at the end of the first lap. Divo was second but dropped back after just three laps to retire again with supercharger issues. Ascari built a comfortable lead while Campari, Benoist and Masetti competed duelled behind him. Then on the 22nd lap, after two hours racing, Ascari cut a corner too close, slide and mowed down 100 metres of fencing, before the car rolled twice throwing the driver out. Badly injured, but conscious, he was pulled free but died on the way to the hospital. When the news came through the crowd was stunned and the other two Alfa Corse cars were withdrawn. The remainder of the race was fairly pedestrian. After a slow start, Benoist had moved up the field and inherited the lead from Campari. Aided by Divo as the rain closed in, he went on to win the race, the first Frenchman to win his home Grand Prix since Georges Boillot in 1913. Teammate Wagner (relieved by teammate Torchy) finished second over seven minutes behind with Masetti just ahead of Costantini in the best of the outpaced Bugattis. Awarded a big wreath of flowers from the French President, Benoist drove to where Ascari had crashed and laid it there in respect.

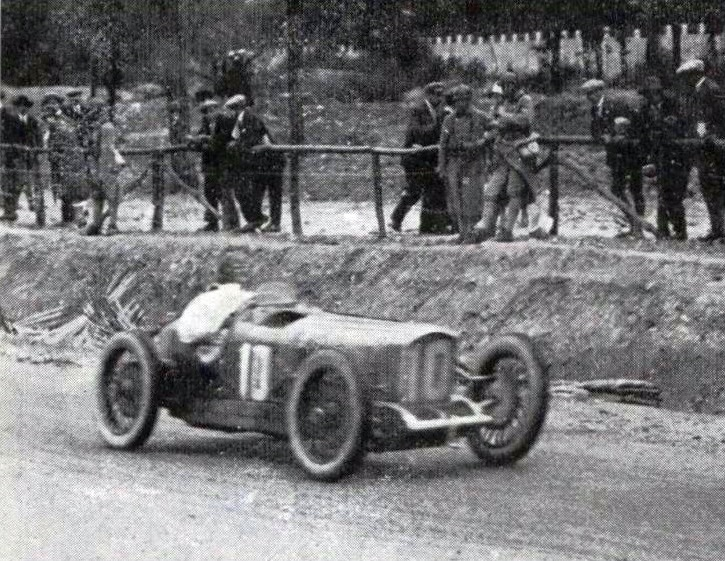
French GP: The Delage of Benoist

So, going into the final race, the Italian Grand Prix at Monza, Alfa Romeo, Delage and Duesenberg had one win apiece. Delage felt they were beaten and instead chose to concentrate on preparing for the upcoming (non-Championship) San Sebastián Grand Prix. Duesenberg, though, did arrive with two cars, for Tommy Milton and young new driver Pete Kreis. Indianapolis winner Pete DePaolo also came across, taking the place of Ascari in the Alfa Corse team, alongside Campari and Brilli-Peri. Tazio Nuvolari had originally been selected but had crashed heavily in the trial when the car's gearbox seized (heavily bandaged he then went out the next week to win the Grand Prix des Nations motorcycle race in pouring rain). Fellow Italian manufacturer Diatto had two new cars, designed by Alfieri Maserati and driven by himself and Emilio Materassi, with the final 2-litre entrant being former pre-war Delage driver Albert Guyot in his own Special. The Organisers also had a separate trophy for 1.5-litre Voiturette cars. The Bugatti works team entered its new 1.5-litre Type 37 and supercharged Type 39, in anticipation of the change in GP formula coming up in 1926. Their competition was from two Chiribiris and Ernest Eldridge’s special. After the accident at Montlhéry, the Lesmo corners were modified putting a 60cm strip of sand to even out the inside of the bends. A banked wall was also put on the final, fastest, corner of the oval.

The Duesenbergs were fastest in practice, although it was said the Alfas had held back to conserve the cars. From the start, Kreis in his Duesenberg bolted from the second row into the lead. But it was short-lived. After setting what turned out to be the fastest lap of the race, he crashed at the Lesmo curves on lap 3. The car rolled but Kreis was unhurt. Campari then led from Brilli-Peri at the head of the field. Milton stayed with the two red cars and took the lead when they pitted for fuel on lap 32. Campari had a slow stop while Brilli-Peri had a quick pitstop and came out in second. He took the lead when Milton was delayed with his stop and took a comfortable win, almost 20 minutes ahead of Campari. The supercharged Bugatti of Costantini was third, ten minutes back, just ahead of Milton and DePaolo.

The victory clinched the inaugural World Championship for Alfa Romeo. Henceforth the iconic Visconti badge carried on their cars had a laurel wreath added to the design to celebrate the achievement.

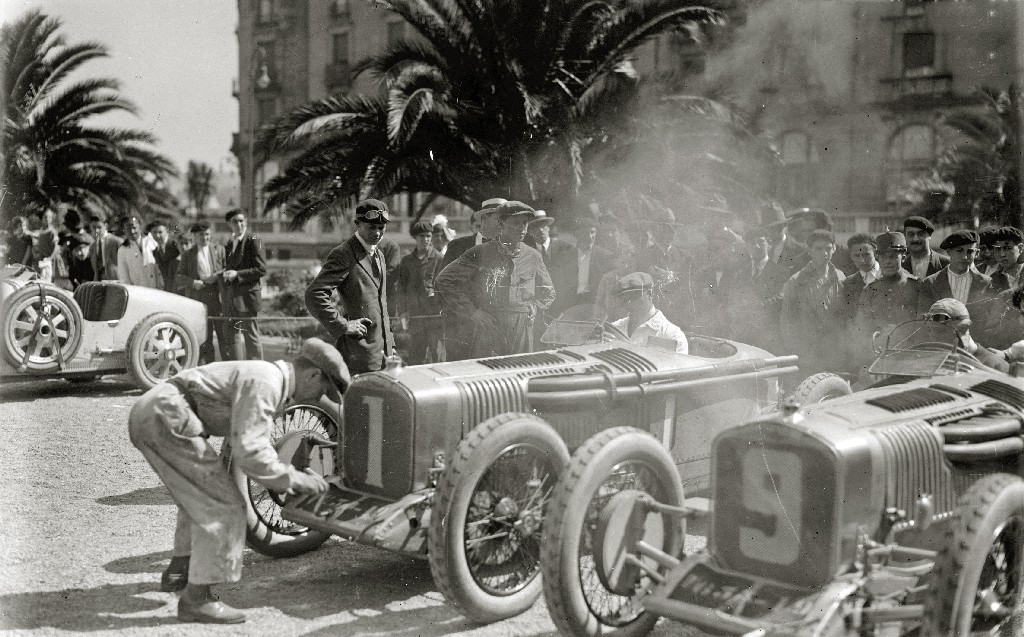
San Sebastián: The Delages of Divo & Benoist before the race

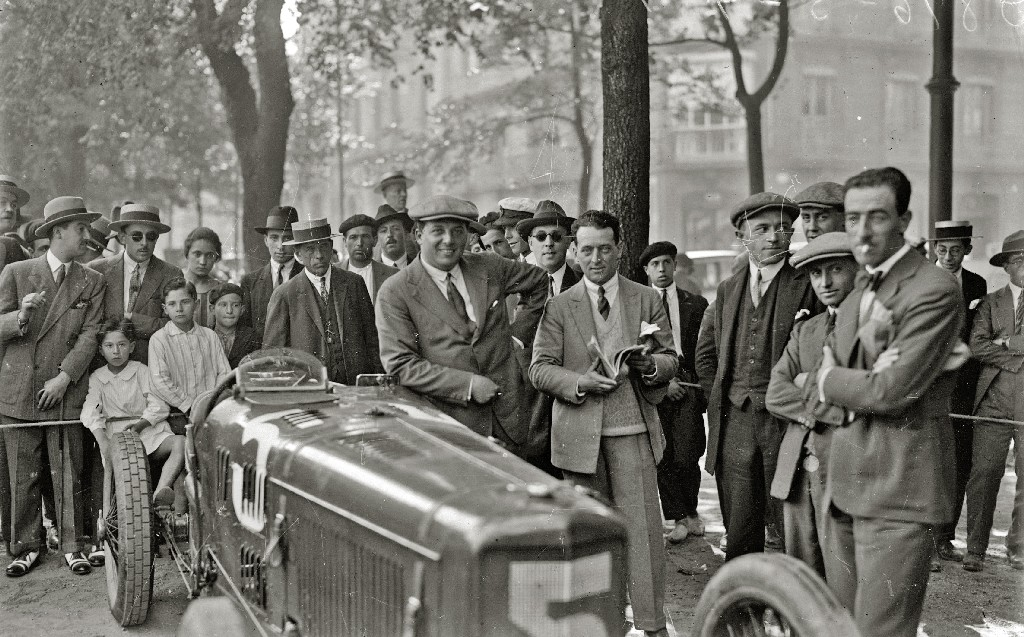
San Sebastián: Masetti and his Sunbeam

Delage had chosen to miss the Italian Grand Prix for the race in Spain a fortnight later. The team arrived with four cars, as did the Bugatti team while Giulio Masetti ran a sole Sunbeam works car. The Lasarte track south of San Sebastián was a 18km circuit on sealed public roads. A huge crowd turned out, including the Spanish King and Queen, for the rolling start at 9am. In the early part Divo led Masetti's Sunbeam and the other Delages of Benoist and Thomas and the Bugatti of Costantini. On the fifth lap the race was marred by the crash of the fourth Delage driver Paul Torchy. He had gone off the road when trying to pass the Sunbeam. Slamming into roadside trees, he was crushed fatally against his steering wheel. At the halfway point, the Delages pitted to refuel. André Morel relieved Divo and Benoist took the lead. The Bugattis had all run into issues and Masetti retired the Sunbeam soon after with faulty steering. Thereafter it was clear running for the Delages and Divo led home a 1-2-3 result over the Bugatti team.

The proliferation of races across Italy spread into France with the advent of two well-supported local races – the Marne Grand Prix held near Reims and the Comminges Grand Prix at St Gaudens, near Toulouse.

German and Austrian manufacturers and drivers had not been allowed to compete in races held in France, Belgium or Great Britain since the end of the war. Mercedes, Benz and Opel led a number of German companies continuing to develop new cars and engineering. However, in May, the German Automobile Club was re-admitted into the AIACR and in November, back into the CSI regulatory body. Local races in Germany were increasing in number. In May, Otto Merz in a 2-litre Mercedes won the main race in an opening weekend of the new Solitude circuit around the castle of the same name near Stuttgart in front of over 100000 spectators. Similarly, the Eifelrennen event was a 3-day festival of racing for cars and motorbikes. When the Mercedes team withdrew from the main race, it lost a lot of its interest and the wet Ardennes weather further detracted from the occasion. Vittorio Rosa won overall in an Alfa Romeo RL Unlike in France and Italy with their number of road and track races, and Brooklands in England with its open-class handicap races, the German racing scene placed equal emphasis on winning hill-climbs with many being held across the country.

This was the last year of the 2-litre formula that had been in place since 1922. It had been a successful innovation, dramatically advancing engine design and bringing the advent of supercharging. But becoming more and more concerned with the higher speeds, the AIACR decided that a new 1.5-litre formula for Grand prix racing would come into effect as of the 1926 season.

== Championship final standings ==
Table lists the highest race position for each manufacturer.
** non-participation disqualified the manufacturer from the championship

| Pos | Manufacturer | 500 (United States) | BEL (Belgium) | FRA (France) | ITA (Italy) | Pts |
|---|---|---|---|---|---|---|
| 1 | (Italy) Alfa Romeo | * | 1 | Ret | 1 | 7 |
| 2 | (United States) Duesenberg | 1 | * | - | 4 | 11 |
| 3 | (France) Bugatti | * | - | 4 | 3 | 13 |
| 4= | (Italy) Diatto | * | - | - | Ret | 17 |
| 4= | (Italy) Chiribiri | * | - | - | Ret | 17 |
| 4= | (United Kingdom) Eldridge Special | * | - | - | Ret | 17 |
| — | (France) Delage | * | Ret | 1 | ** | [12] |
| — | (United States) Junior Eight | 2 ? | * | - | ** | [14] |
| — | (United Kingdom) Sunbeam | * | - | 3 | ** | [15] |
| — | (United States) Miller | 4 ? | * | - | ** | [16] |
| — | (Italy) Fiat | 10? | * | - | ** | [16] |
| — | (United States) Skelly-Ford Special | Ret | * | - | ** | [17] |
| — | (France) Guyot Special | * | - | ** | Ret | [17] |
| Pos | Manufacturer | 500 (United States) | BEL (Belgium) | FRA (France) | ITA (Italy) | Pts |

| Colour | Result | Points |
|---|---|---|
| Gold | Winner | 1 |
| Silver | 2nd place | 2 |
| Bronze | 3rd place | 3 |
| Green | Other finishers | 4 |
| Red | Non-finishers | 5 |
| Blank | Did not participate | 6 |
| Black | Dropped score | 0 * |

* Only one dropped score allowed

== Results of the season's major races ==
| Pos | Driver | Team | ROM (Italy) | TGF (Italy) | IND (United States) | BEL (Belgium) | FRA (France) | ITA (Italy) | SEB (Spain) |
|---|---|---|---|---|---|---|---|---|---|
| | (France) Robert Benoist | Automobiles Delage | | | | Ret | 1 | | 2 |
| | (Italy) Bartolomeo Costantini | Usines Bugatti | | 1 | | | 4 | 3 | Ret |
| | (United States) Pete DePaolo | Duesenberg Brothers; Alfa Corse | | | 1 | | | 5 | |
| | (Italy) Carlo Masetti | Private Entry | 1 | | | | | | |
| | (Italy) Antonio Ascari | Alfa Corse | Ret | | | 1 | † | | |
| | (Italy) Gastone Brilli-Peri | Alfa Corse | Ret | | | Ret | Ret | 1 | |
| | (France) Albert Divo | Automobiles Delage | | | | Ret | Ret [1] | | 1 |
| | (France) Louis Wagner | SA des Autos et Cycles Peugeot; Automobiles Delage | | 2 | | | 2 | | |
| | (Italy) Giuseppe Campari | Alfa Corse | | | | 2 | Ret | 2 | |
| | (Italy) Emilio Materassi | Private Entry; SA Autocontruzioni Diatto | 2 | | | | | Ret | |
| | (United States) Dave Lewis | Cliff Durant | | | 2 | | | | |
| | (Italy) Guido Ginaldi | Private Entry | 3 | 6 | | | | | |
| | (France) André Boillot | SA des Autos et Cycles Peugeot | | 3 | | | | | |
| | (United States) Phil Shafer | Duesenberg Brothers | | | 3 | | | | |
| | (Italy) Giulio Masetti | STD Motors Ltd | | | | | 3 | | Ret |
| | (France) René Thomas | Automobiles Delage | | | | Ret | | | 3 |
| | (Spain) Pierre de Vizcaya | Usines Bugatti | | 4 | | | 7 | 8 | 4 |
| | (United States) Tommy Milton | Tommy Milton | | | 5 | | | 4 | |
| | (Italy) Pasquale Croce | Private Entry | 4 | | | | | | |
| | (United States) Harry Hartz | Harry Hartz | | | 4 | | | | |
| | (Spain) Ferdinand de Vizcaya | Usines Bugatti | | 9 | | | 6 | 6 | 5 |
| | (Italy) Luigi Platé | Fab. Torinese Velivoli; Chiribiri & Cie | 5 | Ret | | | | Ret | |
| | (Italy) Renato Balestrero | Officine Meccaniche | Ret | 5 | | | | | |
| | (France) Jules Goux | Usines Bugatti | | | | | 5 | Ret | Ret |
| | (Italy) Franco Mazzotti | Private Entry | 6 | | | | | | |
| | (United States) Leon Duray | Harry Hartz | | | 6 | | | | |
| Pos | Driver | Team | ROM (Italy) | TGF (Italy) | IND (United States) | BEL (Belgium) | FRA (France) | ITA (Italy) | SEB (Spain) |

italics show the driver of the race's fastest lap.
Only those drivers with a best finish of 6th or better are shown. Sources:
