= 1925 AAA Championship Car season =

Auto racing season

- AAA National Championship Trail

Season
- Races: 11
- Start date: March 1
- End date: November 29

Awards
- National champion: (United States) Peter DePaolo
- Indianapolis 500 winner: (United States) Peter DePaolo

The 1925 AAA Championship Car season consisted of 11 races, beginning in Culver City, California on March 1 and concluding in the same location on November 29. There were also eight non-championship races. Peter DePaolo won the AAA National Championship, as well as the Indianapolis 500.

Ray Cariens died at Culver City during the last race of the season.

== Schedule and results ==
All races running on dirt/brick/board oval.

Rnd	Date	Race name	Track	Location	Type	Pole position	Winning driver
1	March 1	(United States) Culver City Race 1 - 250	Culver City Speedway	Culver City, California	Board	(United States) Ralph DePalma	(United States) Tommy Milton
NC	April 19	(United States) Culver City Heat 1 - 25	Culver City Speedway	Culver City, California	Board	—	(United States) Leon Duray
NC	April 19	(United States) Culver City Heat 2 - 25	Culver City Speedway	Culver City, California	Board	—	(United States) Peter DePaolo
NC	April 19	(United States) Culver City Heat 3 - 25	Culver City Speedway	Culver City, California	Board	—	(Kingdom of Italy) Pietro Bordino
NC	April 19	(United States) Culver City Heat 4 - 25	Culver City Speedway	Culver City, California	Board	—	(United States) Bob McDonogh
NC	April 19	(United States) Culver City Main - 50	Culver City Speedway	Culver City, California	Board	—	(United States) Harry Hartz
2	April 30	(United States) Raisin Day Classic - 150	Fresno Speedway	Fresno, California	Board	(United States) Bennett Hill	(United States) Peter DePaolo
3	May 11	(United States) Southern Speed Classic - 250	Charlotte Speedway	Pineville, North Carolina	Board	—	(United States) Earl Cooper
4	May 30	(United States) International 500 Mile Sweepstakes	Indianapolis Motor Speedway	Speedway, Indiana	Brick	(United States) Leon Duray	(United States) Pete DePaolo
5	June 13	(United States) Spring Classic - 250	Altoona Speedway	Tyrone, Pennsylvania	Board	(United States) Leon Duray	(United States) Peter DePaolo
NC	July 4	(United States) Rockingham Race - 100	Rockingham Park	Salem, New Hampshire	Dirt	(United States) Ralph DePalma	(United States) Ralph DePalma
6	July 11	(United States) Laurel Race 1 - 250	Laurel Park	Laurel, Maryland	Board	(United States) Peter DePaolo	(United States) Peter DePaolo
7	September 7	(United States) Autumn Classic - 250	Altoona Speedway	Tyrone, Pennsylvania	Board	(United States) Bennett Hill	(United States) Bob McDonogh
NC	September 19	(United States) Syracuse Race - 100	New York State Fairgrounds	Syracuse, New York	Dirt	—	(United States) Ralph DePalma
NC	October 3	(United States) Fresno Race - 150	Fresno Speedway	Fresno, California	Board	(United States) Jerry Wunderlich	(United States) Fred Comer
8	October 26	(United States) Laurel Race 2 - 250	Laurel Park	Laurel, Maryland	Board	—	(United States) Bob McDonogh
9	October 31	(United States) Autumn Classic - 250	Rockingham Park	Salem, New Hampshire	Board	(United States) Peter DePaolo	(United States) Peter DePaolo
10	November 11	(United States) Charlotte Race - 250	Charlotte Speedway	Pineville, North Carolina	Board	(United States) Bennett Hill	(United States) Tommy Milton
11	November 29	(United States) Culver City Race 2 - 250	Culver City Speedway	Culver City, California	Board	(United States) Earl Cooper	(United States) Frank Elliott

Non-championship race
- Indianapolis 500 was AAA-sanctioned and counted towards the 1925 AIACR World Manufacturers' Championship title.

^A Shared drive

== Final points standings ==
Note: Drivers had to be running at the finish to score points. Points scored by drivers sharing a ride were split according to percentage of race driven. Starters were not allowed to score points as relief drivers; if a race starter finished the race in another car, in a points scoring position, those points were awarded to the driver who had started the car.
The final standings based on reference.

Pos	Driver	CUL1 (United States)	FRE (United States)	CHA1 (United States)	INDY (United States)	ALT1 (United States)	LAU1 (United States)	ALT2 (United States)	LAU2 (United States)	SAL (United States)	CHA2 (United States)	CUL2 (United States)	Pts
1	(United States) Peter DePaolo	2	1	5	1*	1	**1**	DNP	2	**1***	15	9	3260
2	(United States) Tommy Milton	1*	2	3	5	3	7		3	16	1	7	1745
3	(United States) Harry Hartz	3	6	2	4	4	3	2	9	4	2	2	1640
4	(United States) Bob McDonogh	4	9	6	14	7	2	1	1	5	16	4	1505
5	(United States) Earl Cooper	7	5	1	17	12	14	3	5	3	11	**5***	935
6	(United States) Frank Elliott	14	8	12	12	2	5	9	14	14	5	1	870
7	(United States) Dave Lewis	8			2	18						Wth	465
8	(United States) Fred Comer	17	7	4	11	5	4	4	8	15	6	3	459
9	(United States) Ralph Hepburn				16	9	8	10	4	2	7	12	380
10	(United States) Phil Shafer	16		7	3	17	9	7	6	9	Wth	DNS	340
11	(United States) Norman Batten				1			6		7	4	Wth	250
12	(United States) Leon Duray	13	3	11	**6**	**5**	12	5	11	13	8	8	221
13	(United States) Jerry Wunderlich	11	10	14	18	11	Wth	11	12	8	3	13	155
14	(United States) Pete Kreis RY	5		10	8	6	9		13	11	10		122
15	(United States) Bennett Hill	19	**4**	13	18	14	13	**15**	7	12	**13**	10	75
16	(United States) Earl Devore			DNP	13	8	8	12	15	6	14	15	55
17	(United States) Dave Evans R							8		Wth	9	6	46
18	(Kingdom of Italy) Pietro Bordino	6		9	10								46
19	(United States) Ralph DePalma	**18**			7		8						45
20	(United States) Jim Hill					10	6	14		17			40
21	(United States) W. E. Shattuc	10		DNP	9	15	DNQ	13	10	10	12	11	40
22	(United States) L. L. Corum			8	7								25
23	(France) Antoine Mourre				10								19
24	(United States) Vic Spooner R							8	DNS	DNQ			10
25	(United States) Reginald Johnson R	9		15	DNS	DNS					17	Wth	10
26	(United States) Wade Morton	12		DNQ	15	13	15	8					4
-	(United States) Ora Haibe				12								0
-	(United States) Glenn Shultz R				13								0
-	(United States) Ray Cariens				18							14	0
-	(United States) Eddie Hearne	15											0
-	(United States) Jimmy Gleason R				15								0
-	(United States) Herbert Jones R				19								0
-	(United Kingdom) Alfred Moss				19								0
-	(United States) Ira Vail				20								0
-	(United States) Fred Harder				21								0
-	(United States) Melville Jones R				21								0
-	(United States) Jules Ellingboe				22								0
-	(United States) Tom Alley				DNQ								0
-	(United States) Clarence Belt				DNQ								0
-	(United States) Nick Eckerle				DNQ								0
-	(United States) Carl Green				DNQ								0
-	(United States) Charles Shambaugh				DNQ								0
-	(United States) Harry Thicksten				DNQ								0
-	(United States) Lou Fink							DNQ					0
-	(United States) Cliff Durant	DNS			DNS								0
-	(United States) Stuart Wilkinson	DNS											0
-	(United States) Harold Skelly				DNS								0
-	(France) Albert Guyot				DNP								0
-	(United States) Steve Smith				DNP								0
-	(United States) Frank Lockhart	DSQ											0
Pos	Driver	CUL1 (United States)	FRE (United States)	CHA1 (United States)	INDY (United States)	ALT1 (United States)	LAU1 (United States)	ALT2 (United States)	LAU2 (United States)	SAL (United States)	CHA2 (United States)	CUL2 (United States)	Pts

Color	Result
Gold	Winner
Silver	2nd place
Bronze	3rd place
Green	4th & 5th place
Light Blue	6th-10th place
Dark Blue	Finished (Outside Top 10)
Purple	Did not finish (Ret)
Red	Did not qualify (DNQ)
Brown	Withdrawn (Wth)
Black	Disqualified (DSQ)
White	Did not start (DNS)
Blank	Did not participate (DNP)
Blank	Not competing

**In-line notation**
**Bold**	Pole position
Italics	Ran fastest race lap
*	Led most race laps
Rookie of the Year
Rookie

== See also ==
- 1925 Indianapolis 500
