= Wheeler-Schebler Trophy Race =

Former motor race in Indianapolis

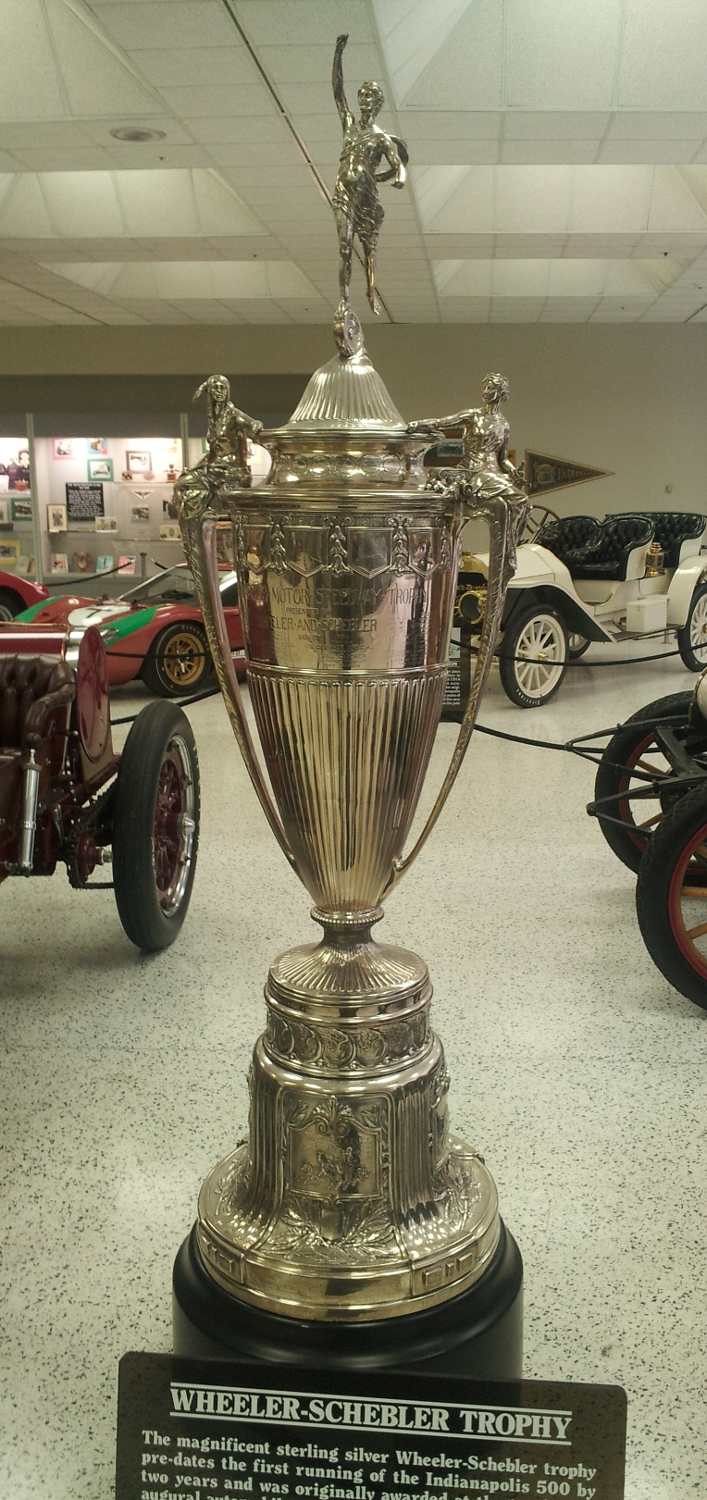
The trophy on display at the Indianapolis Motor Speedway Museum

The Wheeler-Schebler Trophy Race was an automobile race held at the Indianapolis Motor Speedway in each of the two years prior to the first Indianapolis 500. The trophy was sponsored by the Wheeler-Schebler Carburetor Company. Frank Wheeler, one of the four co-founders of the Speedway, was also the president and co-founder of Wheeler-Schebler. The 1909 race was originally scheduled for 300 miles, but was ended at 235 miles due to deteriorating track conditions.

== Race results ==
Year	Date	Winning Driver	Car	Race Distance		Time of Race	Winning Speed	Starting Cars
Year	Date	Winning Driver	Car	Miles	Laps	Time of Race	Winning Speed	Starting Cars
1909	Aug 21	(United States) Leigh Lynch	Jackson	235	94	04:13:31.40	57.907 mph	19
1910	May 28	(United States) Ray Harroun	Marmon	200	80	02:46:31.00	72.065 mph	19

== Wheeler-Schebler Trophy in later years ==
In 1911, the Indianapolis Motor Speedway management ceased holding multiple racing events per year, in favor of a single major race annually – the Indianapolis 500. As a result, the Wheeler-Schebler Trophy race was discontinued.

In 1914 the trophy reappeared, now as an award given to the owner of the car leading the Indianapolis 500 at the 400-mile mark (lap 160). On numerous occasions, the leader at lap 160 went on to win the race. For the 1916 race only, the trophy was presented to the leader at lap 100 (250 miles) since the race was scheduled for only 300 miles.

The trophy was retired and given permanently to car owner Harry Hartz after his cars claimed the trophy in three consecutive years (1930, 1931, 1932). The original rules in 1909 stipulated that the trophy became the permanent possession of the individual to win it three times. Many years later, in 1956, the trophy was re-acquired by the Indianapolis Motor Speedway Museum.

=== Trophy winners (1914–1932) ===
Year	Winning Owner	Winning driver	Finishing Position
1914	Louis Delâge	Rene Thomas	Race winner
1915	E.C. Patterson	Ralph DePalma	Race winner
1916	Peugeot Auto Racing Co.	Dario Resta	Race winner
1919	Howdy Wilcox	Howdy Wilcox	Race winner
1920	Ralph DePalma	Ralph DePalma	5th
1921	Louis Chevrolet	Tommy Milton	Race winner
1922	Jimmy Murphy	Jimmy Murphy	Race winner
1923	Harry C. Stutz	Tommy Milton	Race winner
1924	Earl Cooper	Earl Cooper	2nd
1925	Cliff Durant	Dave Lewis	2nd
1926	Pete Kreis	Frank Lockhart	Race winner
1927	Cooper Engineering Co.	Bob McDonogh/Pete DePaolo	6th
1928	J. R. Burgamy	Tony Gulotta	10th
1929	Maude "M. A." Yagle	Ray Keech	Race winner
1930	Harry Hartz	Billy Arnold	Race winner
1931	Harry Hartz	Billy Arnold	19th
1932	Harry Hartz	Fred Frame	Race winner
