= 1898 in motorsport =

The following is an overview of the events of 1898 in motorsport including the major racing events, motorsport venues that were opened and closed during a year, championships and non-championship events that were established and disestablished in a year, and births and deaths of racing drivers and other motorsport people.

== Births ==
Date	Month	Name	Nationality	Occupation	Note	Ref
6	April	Pete DePaolo	American	Racing driver	Indianapolis 500 winner (1925).	
9	June	Luigi Fagioli	Italian	Racing driver	1951 French Grand Prix winner	
