= 1925 Italian Grand Prix =

- Race 4 of 4 in the 1925 World Manufacturers' Championship

Race details
- Date: 6 September 1925
- Official name: V Gran Premio d'Italia
- Location: Monza, Italy
- Course: Autodromo Nazionale di Monza
- Course length: 10.00 km (6.21 miles)
- Distance: 80 laps, 800 km (496.8 miles)

Pole position
Driver	(Italy) Emilio Materassi	
- Grid positions set by car number

Fastest lap
Driver	(United States) Pete Kreis	Duesenberg
- Time: 3:36.7

Podium
First	(Italy) Gastone Brilli-Peri	Alfa Romeo
Second	(Italy) Giuseppe Campari; (Italy) Giovanni Minozzi	Alfa Romeo
Third	(Italy) Meo Costantini	Bugatti

The 1925 Italian Grand Prix was a combined Grand Prix and Voiturette motor race held at Monza on 6 September 1925. The voiturettes competed for their own trophy. It was the final race of the 1925 AIACR World Manufacturers' Championship season.

== Classification ==
Pos	No	Driver	Car	Laps	Time/Retired
1	14	(Italy) Gastone Brilli-Peri	Alfa Romeo P2	80	5h14m33
2	5	(Italy) Giuseppe Campari	Alfa Romeo P2	80	5h33m30
2	5	(Italy) Giovanni Minozzi	Alfa Romeo P2	80	5h33m30
2	5	(Italy) Carlo Sozzi	Alfa Romeo P2	80	5h33m30
3	19	(Italy) Meo Costantini	Bugatti 39 *	80	5h44m40
4	7	(United States) Tommy Milton	Duesenberg 122	80	5h46m40
5	10	(United States) Pete DePaolo	Alfa Romeo P2	80	5h48m10
6	23	(Spain) Ferdinand de Vizcaya	Bugatti 37 *	80	5h50m49
7	24	(Italy) Giulio Foresti	Bugatti 37 *	80	5h55m18
8	21	(Spain) Pierre de Vizcaya	Bugatti 37 *	80	6h01m37
Ret	22	(France) Jules Goux	Bugatti 39 *	64	Fuel tank
Ret	1	(Italy) Emilio Materassi	Diatto GP	39	Mechanical
Ret	17	(Italy) Ettore Santoleri	Chiribiri 12/16 *	38	Crash
Ret	6	(Italy) Alfieri Maserati	Diatto 20S	38	Mechanical
Ret	20	(Italy) Luigi Platé	Chiribiri 12/16 *	13	Mechanical
Ret	4	(France) Albert Guyot	Guyot Speciale GS25	8	Mechanical
Ret	18	(United Kingdom) Ernest Eldridge	Eldridge Special *	3	Magneto
Ret	11	(United States) Pete Kreis	Duesenberg 122	2	Crash
DNA	2	?	Duesenberg 122		Did not arrive
DNA	3	(France) Albert Divo	Delage 2LCV		Did not arrive
DNA	8	(France) Robert Benoist	Delage 2LCV		Did not arrive
DNA	9	?	Rolland-Pilain		Did not arrive
DNA	12	(France) René Thomas	Delage 2LCV		Did not arrive
DNA	13	?	Rolland-Pilain		Did not arrive
DNA	15	(France) Paul Torchy	Delage 2LCV		Did not arrive
DNA	16	?	Alfa Romeo P2		Did not arrive

* Voiturette

Grand Prix Race
Previous race: 1925 French Grand Prix	1925 Grand Prix season Grandes Épreuves	Next race: 1926 Indianapolis 500
Previous race: 1924 Italian Grand Prix	Italian Grand Prix	Next race: 1926 Italian Grand Prix
