= Ray Cariens =

American racing driver (1899–1925)

- Born: Raymond Lloyd Cariens; December 20, 1899 Cisne, Illinois, U.S.
- Died: December 1, 1925 (aged 25) Los Angeles, California, U.S.

Champ Car career
- 2 races run over 2 years
- Best finish: 19th (tie) (1924)
- First race: 1924 Fall Classic (Altoona)
- Last race: 1925 Culver City 250 #2 (Culver City)
Wins	Podiums	Poles
0	0	1

Raymond Lloyd Cariens (December 20, 1899 – December 1, 1925) was an American racing driver who competed in the AAA Championship Car series. He made his debut in 1924 at Altoona Speedway. He then was a relief driver for Bennett Hill in the 1925 Indianapolis 500. Later that year he was fatally injured on November 29, 1925, in an accident during his second Championship car start on the 1.25 mile (2.01 km) board oval in Culver City, California.
