= M. C. Jones =

M. C. Jones may refer to:

- Melville Jones (racing driver), (1893–1975), American racing driver
- Milton Jones (racing driver), (1894–1932), American racing driver
