= Melville Jones =

Melville Jones may refer to:

- Melville Jones (bishop), (1866–1941), New Zealander bishop
- Melville Jones (racing driver), (1901–1989), American racing driver
