= Carlo Sozzi =

Italian racing driver

- At the 1925 French Grand Prix, in the ill-fated Antonio Ascari Alfa

Carlo Sozzi was an Italian racing driver and businessman.

== Motor racing ==
Sozzi's first appearance of note came as a reserve driver for Alfa Romeo in the 1925 season; at the 1925 Italian Grand Prix, he drove a Tipo B for a dozen laps as relief to Giuseppe Campari and Giovanni Minozzi. Thanks to extensive attrition, the trio finished second to Gastone Brilli-Peri, and secured the world championship for the Portello marque.

It was Sozzi's only Grand Prix appearance; he drove in the Mille Miglia from 1927 to 1932, every time competing in an Alfa Romeo, and his best result - 7th (3rd in class) - was registered with a Alfa Romeo RL SS in his first tilt.

== Business career ==
Sozzi remained part of the world of racing outside the cockpit, as a manager for Shell Petroleum's operations in Italy.
