= Giovanni Minozzi =

Italian racing driver

- At the 1931 French Grand Prix

Giovanni Minozzi was an Italian Grand Prix driver, active before the Second World War.

== Career ==
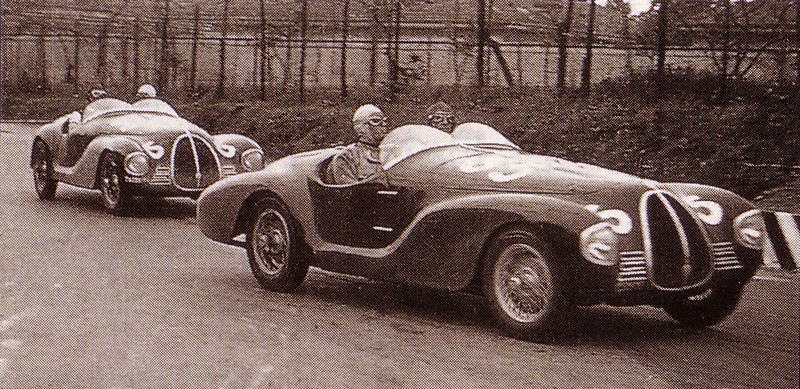
Auto Avio at the 1940 Mille Miglia; Minozzi is in the second car, alongside Alberto Ascari

The nephew of Antonio Ascari, Minozzi was recruited as the reserve driver for Alfa Romeo in the 1925 Grand Prix season. He made his Grande Epreuve debut at the 1925 Italian Grand Prix, replacing Giuseppe Campari after 33 laps (out of 80) when Campari had a problem which needed diagnosing. Minozzi pulled in after a lap for engine repairs, and a few laps later was swapped out for the other reserve driver (Carlo Sozzi) who drove for a dozen laps before Campari returned to the cockpit. Thanks to extensive attrition, the trio finished second to Gastone Brilli-Peri, and secured the world championship for the Portello marque.

It was technically Minozzi's best performance in a national Grand Prix, although, given his limited participation in that race, his greater achievement came in the 1931 AIACR European Championship series, which mandated 10 hour races, and saw Alfa promote him to Grand Prix team. He missed out on a drive in the 1931 Italian Grand Prix as during the race Alfa decided to switch the early-retiring Tazio Nuvolari to take his spot as relief driver for Campari, but he finished 3rd at the 1931 Belgian Grand Prix in one of the factory P2s, his co-driver Nando Minoia taking the European title as a result.

Minozzi was involved in a frightening accident at the 1934 Circuito d'Alessandria, when his Alfa left the road and six spectators were injured; the same race saw Carlo Pedrazzini killed in an accident. His final national Grand Prix was the 1938 Swiss, in his own Alfa Romeo Monza, and in which he was an early retirement.

Minozzi took part in the Mille Miglia from 1929 to 1950, his best result being 10th in 1930 in an Alfa Romeo 6C. His most notable appearance however came in the truncated 1940 event, which saw the first appearance of Enzo Ferrari's Auto Avio Costruzioni 815, sharing the drive with his young cousin Alberto Ascari; Minozzi - who, 15 years earlier, had been a pallbearer at Alberto's father's funeral, and who was by now 42 years old - was seen as a calming influence on the excitable Antonio. It was to no avail as the duo retired after leading their class.

== Results ==
- Single seaters
- Sportscars

=== Complete European Championship results ===
(key) (Races in bold indicate pole position) (Races in italics indicate fastest lap)

Year	Entrant	Chassis	Engine	1	2	3	EDC	Pts
1931	SA Alfa Romeo	Alfa Romeo 8C-2300	Alfa Romeo 2.3 L8	ITA; DND		**BEL**; 3	n/a	n/a
1931	SA Alfa Romeo	Alfa Romeo Monza	Alfa Romeo 2.3 L8		FRA; 11		n/a	n/a
