= Leigh Lynch =

American racing driver (1882–1945)

- Born: Leigh Berger Lynch Jr. August 18, 1882 Jackson, Michigan, U.S.
- Died: March 25, 1945 (aged 62) Pontiac, Michigan, U.S.

Champ Car career
- 3 races run over 2 years
- First race: 1909 Wheeler-Schebler Trophy (Indianapolis)
- Last race: 1910 Wheeler-Schebler Trophy (Indianapolis)
- First win: 1909 Wheeler-Schebler Trophy (Indianapolis)
| Wins | Podiums | Poles |
|---|---|---|
| 1 | 3 | 0 |

Leigh Berger Lynch Jr. (August 18, 1882 – March 25, 1945) was an American racing driver, who was active in the years 1906–1910.

== Racing career ==
Lynch won the 1909 Wheeler-Schebler Trophy Race at the Indianapolis Motor Speedway (IMS). This race which was shortened to 235 miles (378 km) from its originally-planned 300 miles (480 km), due to deteriorating track conditions. This was the final race of the track's first weekend of automobile races, and was also the last race held before the track's surface of crushed stone was replaced with brick. Lynch also started nine other races at IMS during 1909 and 1910, including a second-place finish in the 1910 Wheeler-Schebler Race. Little is known of Lynch's career outside of his appearances at IMS. He is known to have earned victories in two hill climb races at Box Springs Canyon in Riverside, California, and in a 20-mile (32 km) race at the Mardi Gras Track in New Orleans, Louisiana.

== Sources ==
- Scott, D. Bruce; INDY: Racing Before the 500; Indiana Reflections; 2005; ISBN 0-9766149-0-1.
- Galpin, Darren; A Record of Motorsport Racing Before World War I.
- http://www.motorsport.com/stats
- http://www.champcarstats.com
