= Herbert Jones (racing driver) =

American racing driver (1904–1926)

- Born: L. Herbert Jones; May 23, 1904 Indianapolis, Indiana, U.S.
- Died: May 28, 1926 (aged 22) Indianapolis, Indiana, U.S.

Champ Car career
- 1 race run over 2 years
- First race: 1925 Indianapolis 500 (Indianapolis)
Wins	Podiums	Poles
0	0	0

L. Herbert Jones (May 23, 1904 – May 28, 1926) was an American racing driver from Indianapolis.

Jones drove in the 1925 Indianapolis 500, one of only 25 drivers in the field, but crashed on lap 69 and finished 19th.

In 1926, Jones attempted to return to the race. However, he clipped the inside wall at the northwest turn on his second qualifying lap on May 27, flipping the car several times and fracturing his skull. He died of his injuries the following day.

== Motorsports career results ==
=== Indianapolis 500 results ===
Year	Car	Start	Qual	Rank	Finish	Laps	Led	Retired
1925	29	17	89.401	21	19	69	0	Crash T1
Totals						69	0	

Starts	1
Poles	0
Front Row	0
Wins	0
Top 5	0
Top 10	0
Retired	1

== Personal life ==
Jones was born in Indianapolis, Indiana on May 23, 1904. He died on May 28, 1926, and is buried in Crown Hill Cemetery and Arboretum in Section 53, Lot 380.
