= Jean Gras =

French automobile manufactured in the 1920s

The Jean Gras was a small scale French automobile manufactured by a concern based in Issy-les-Moulineaux, Paris from 1924 until 1927.

The company showed two cars at the Paris 1924 Salon, the Type A had a 1494 cc overhead camshaft engine and the Type B a 1200 cc pushrod overhead valve unit. Both engines were supplied by C.I.M.E.. Four wheel brakes using the Perrot system were fitted and the chassis carried a six-light saloon body.

In 1927 a six-cylinder model with 1557 cc engine was added to the range.

The cars were built in the former Philos factory at Lyon.

A Jean Gras took part in the 1925 300 mile race at Montlhéry, France, finishing fifth.
