= Jerry Wunderlich (racing driver) =

American racing driver (1889–1937)

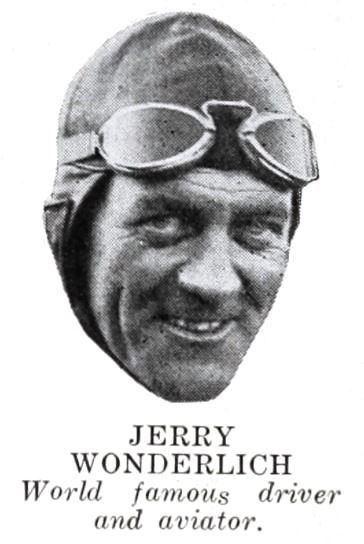
- Wunderlich, circa 1924
- Born: Gerald White Wunderlich; August 25, 1889 Chicago, Illinois, U.S.
- Died: April 9, 1937 (aged 47) Bloomington, Illinois, U.S.

Champ Car career
- 43 races run over 6 years
- Best finish: 7th (1922, 1923)
- First race: 1921 Universal Trophy (Uniontown)
- Last race: 1926 Carl G. Fisher Trophy (Fulford)
Wins	Podiums	Poles
0	5	0

Gerald White Wunderlich (August 25, 1889 – April 9, 1937) was an American racing driver.

== Motorsports career results ==
=== Indianapolis 500 results ===
Year	Car	Start	Qual	Rank	Finish	Laps	Led	Retired
1922	24	7	97.760	7	6	200	0	Running
1924	7	11	99.360	11	12	200	0	Running
Totals						400	0	

Starts	2
Poles	0
Front Row	0
Wins	0
Top 5	0
Top 10	1
Retired	0
