= Bob McDonogh =

American racing driver (1900–1945)

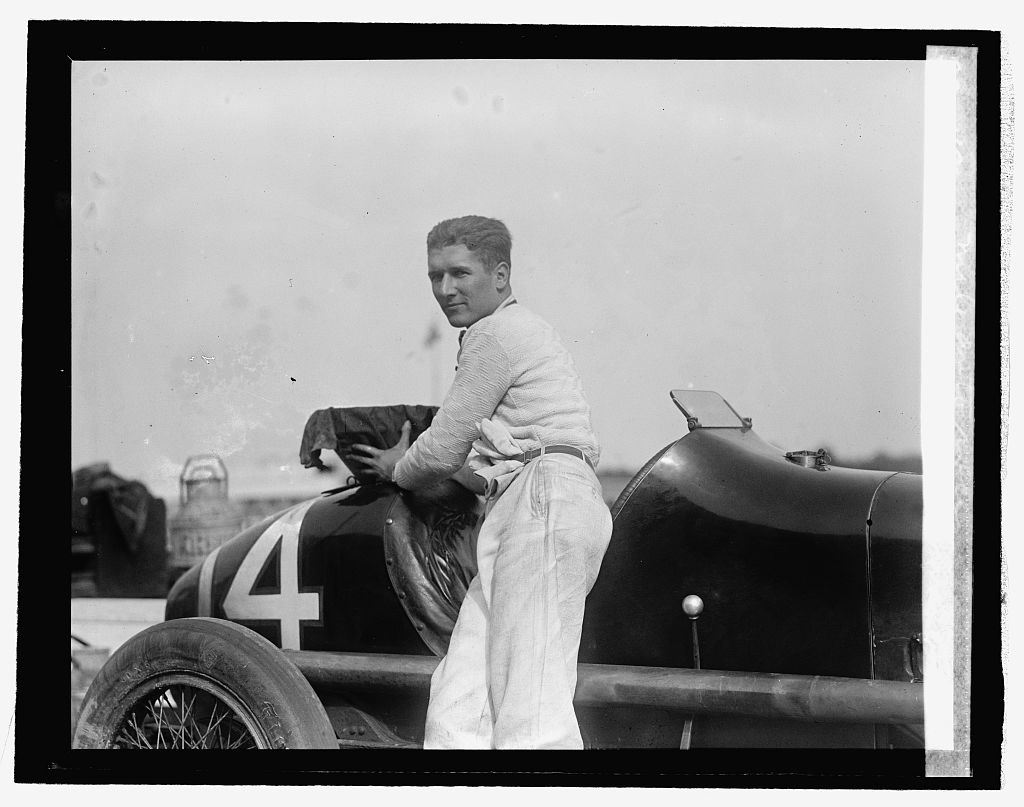
- McDonogh in 1925
- Born: Robert Webster McDonogh; March 5, 1900 San Francisco, California, U.S.
- Died: December 10, 1945 (aged 45) Columbus, Ohio, U.S.

Champ Car career
- 38 races run over 7 years
- Best finish: 4th (1925)
- First race: 1924 Indianapolis 500 (Indianapolis)
- Last race: 1932 Indianapolis 500 (Indianapolis)
- First win: 1925 Autumn Classic (Altoona)
- Last win: 1925 Laurel 250 #2 (Laurel)
| Wins | Podiums | Poles |
|---|---|---|
| 2 | 8 | 4 |

Robert Webster McDonogh (March 5, 1900 – December 10, 1945) was an American racing driver.

== Life and career ==
McDonogh made 38 starts in AAA Championship racing from 1924 through 1932. Most of McDonogh's career was during the board track era. Outside of Indianapolis, he only made two starts on tracks that weren't board tracks, both at Syracuse. McDonogh won three races on board tracks during the 1925 AAA Championship season, at (Culver City – a non-Championship event; Altoona and Laurel, Maryland). He finished the 1925 season ranked fourth in points. McDonogh did stunt work for movies and later worked as an airplane mechanic.

== Motorsports career results ==
=== Indianapolis 500 results ===
| Year | Car | Start | Qual | Rank | Finish | Laps | Led | Retired |
|---|---|---|---|---|---|---|---|---|
| 1924 | 19 | 18 | 91.550 | 19 | 10 | 200 | 0 | Running |
| 1925 | 14 | 20 | 101.931 | 18 | 14 | 188 | 0 | Truss rod |
| 1927 | 14 | 7 | 113.175 | 8 | 6 | 200 | 0 | Running |
| 1929 | 5 | 19 | 111.614 | 18 | 18 | 74 | 0 | Oil tank |
| 1932 | 58 | 24 | 113.276 | 10 | 38 | 17 | 0 | Oil line |
| Totals | | | | | | 679 | 0 | |

| Starts | 5 |
| Poles | 0 |
| Front Row | 0 |
| Wins | 0 |
| Top 5 | 0 |
| Top 10 | 2 |
| Retired | 3 |
