= Phil Shafer =

American racing driver (1891–1971)

- Born: Phil Earl Shafer; November 13, 1891 Des Moines, Iowa, U.S.
- Died: January 29, 1971 (aged 79) Des Moines, Iowa, U.S.

Champ Car career
- 30 races run over 18 years
- Best finish: 9th (1924)
- First race: 1923 Beverly Hills 250 #2 (Beverly Hills)
- Last race: 1952 Pikes Peak Hill Climb (Pikes Peak)
- First win: 1924 Syracuse 150 (Syracuse)
Wins	Podiums	Poles
1	2	1

Phil Earl "Red" Shafer (November 13, 1891 – January 29, 1971) was an American racing driver and constructor.

== Racing career ==
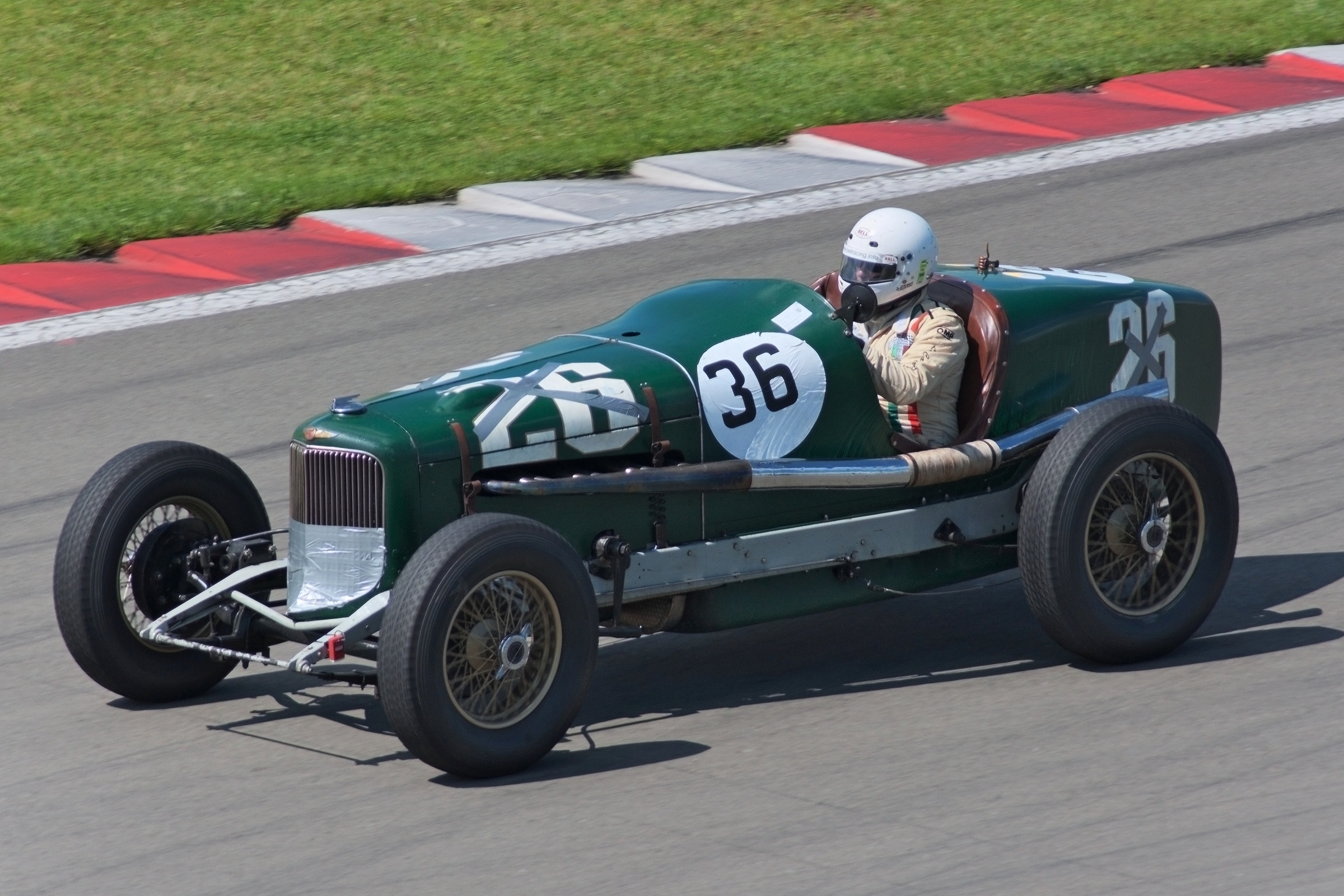
1932 Buick Shafer 8

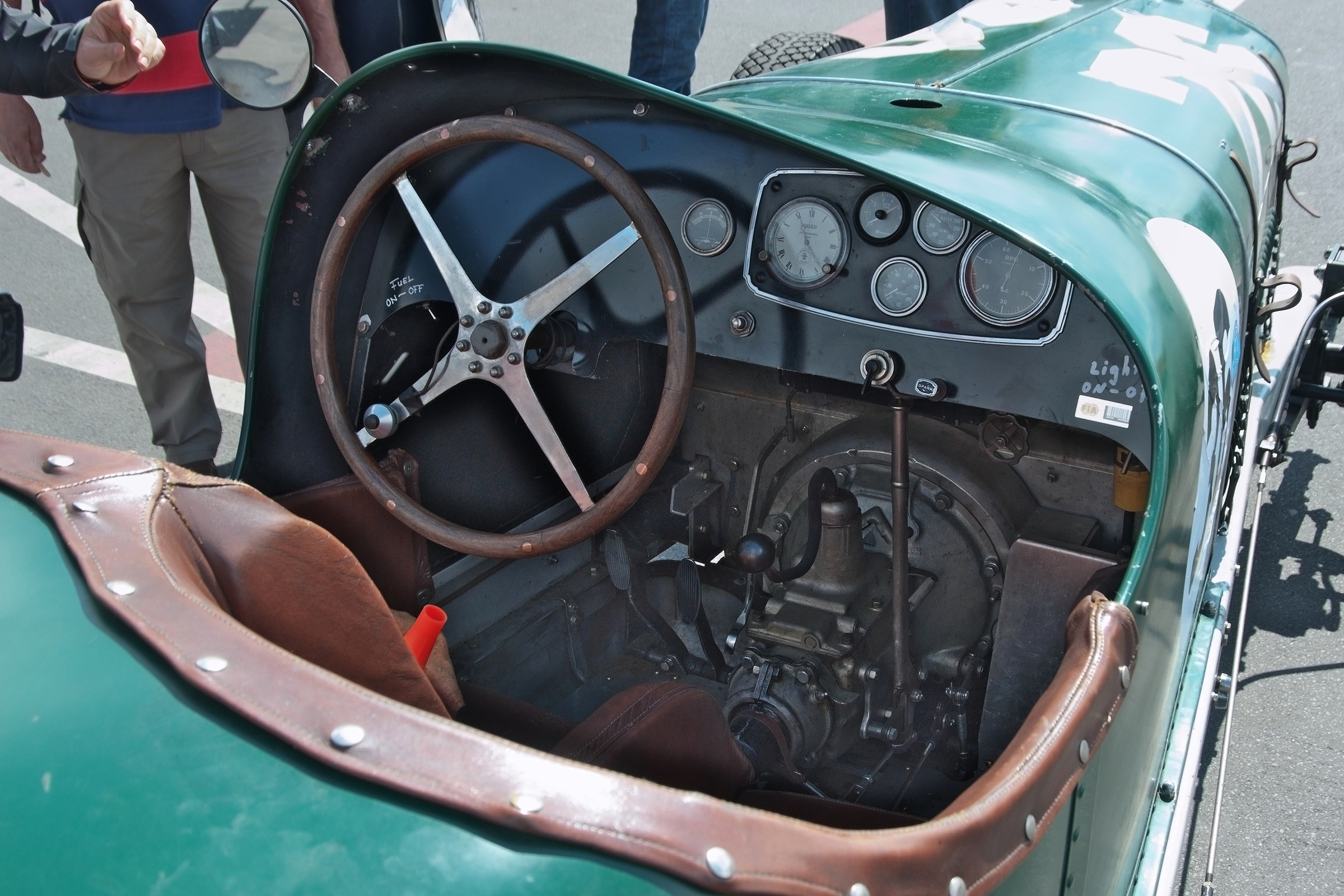
Dashboard of 1932 Buick Shafer 8

Shafer made 30 AAA Championship Car starts from 1923 to 1952. He captured one win in 1924 at the New York State Fairgrounds Raceway in Syracuse, New York. That year, he finished a career best ninth in the National Championship. Shafer won the 1933 Elgin National Trophy. His last oval or road course Championship Car start came in 1936 - afterwards the only Championship starts he made were in the Pikes Peak Auto Hillclimb. He later built his own racing chassis.

== Motorsports career results ==
=== Indianapolis 500 results ===
Year	Car	Start	Qual	Rank	Finish	Laps	Led	Retired
1925	9	22	103.523	16	3	200	13	Running
1926	4	5	106.647	5	10	146	16	Flagged
1929	17	18	111.628	17	12	150	0	Flagged
1930	15	8	102.279	13	7	200	0	Running
1931	12	23	105.103	28	12	200	0	Running
1932	33	26	110.708	25	11	197	0	Flagged
1934	26	6	113.816	12	16	130	0	Camshaft drive
Totals						1223	29	

Starts	7
Poles	0
Front Row	0
Wins	0
Top 5	1
Top 10	3
Retired	1
