= 1925 Indianapolis 500 =

American motor race

13th Indianapolis 500
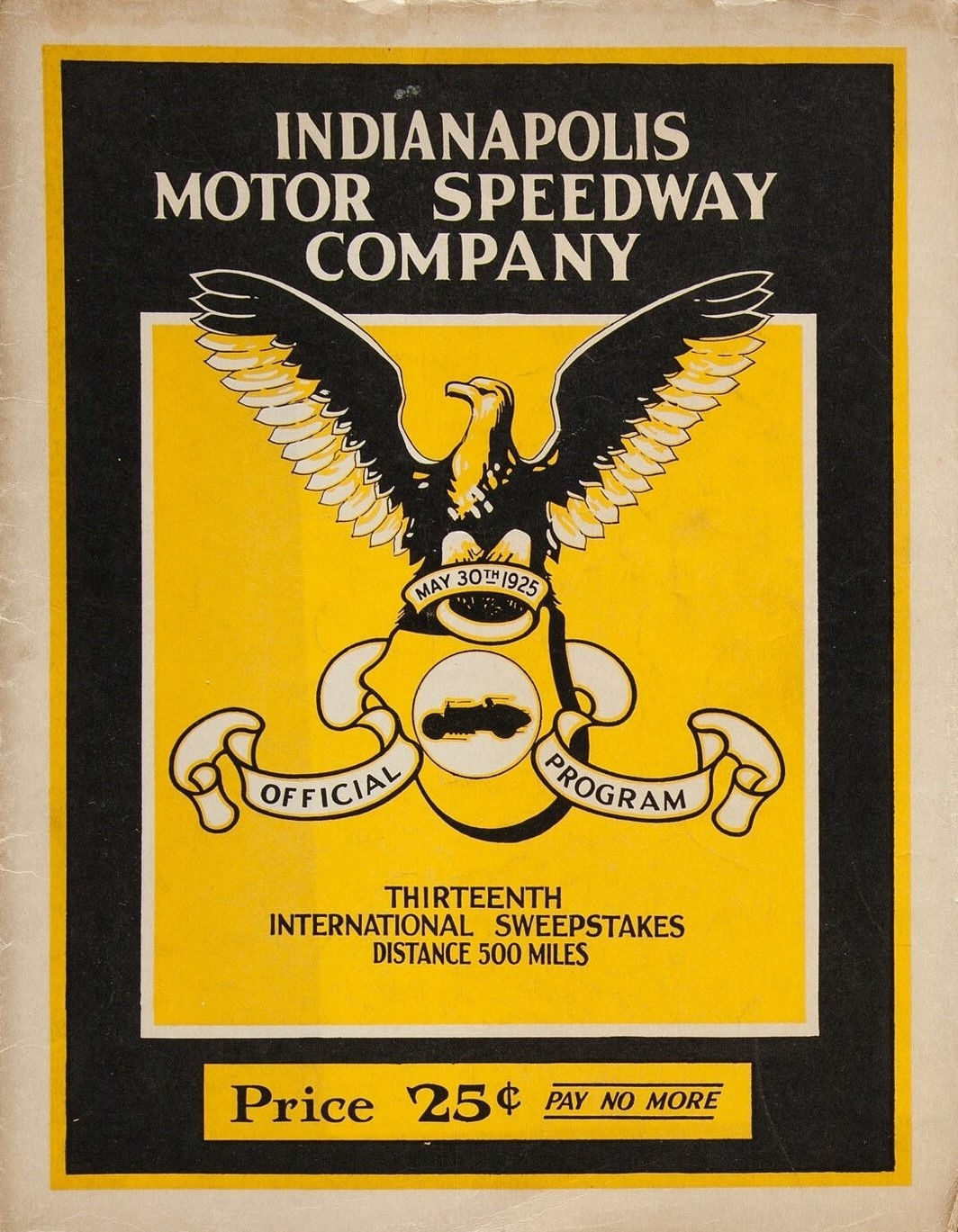

Indianapolis Motor Speedway

Indianapolis 500
- Sanctioning body: AAA
- Date: May 30, 1925
- Winner: Peter DePaolo
- Winning Entrant: Duesenberg
- Winning Chief Mechanic: Augie Duesenberg & Harry C. "Cotton" Henning
- Winning time: 4:56:39.47
- Average speed: 101.127 mph (162.748 km/h)
- Pole position: Leon Duray
- Pole speed: 113.196 mph (182.171 km/h)
- Most laps led: Peter DePaolo (115)

Pre-race
- Pace car: Rickenbacker 8
- Pace car driver: Eddie Rickenbacker
- Starter: Seth Klein
- Honorary referee: Charles M. Schwab
- Estimated attendance: 150,000

Chronology
Previous	Next
1924	1926

The 13th International 500-Mile Sweepstakes Race was held at the Indianapolis Motor Speedway on Saturday, May 30, 1925.

Race winner Peter DePaolo became the first driver to complete the 500 miles in under five hours, and have an average over 100 mph. Norman Batten drove 21 laps of relief (laps 106–127) while DePaolo had his hands bandaged due to blisters and bruises.

== Time trials ==
Four-lap (10 mile) qualifying runs were utilized. Leon Duray won the pole position with a 4-lap track record of 113.196 mph. Peter DePaolo, who qualified second, set the 1-lap track record at 114.285 mph.

Qualifying Results
Date	Driver	Lap 1 (mph)	Lap 2 (mph)	Lap 3 (mph)	Lap 4 (mph)	Average Speed (mph)
5/26/1925	Leon Duray	113.22	113.44	113.44	113.41	113.196

== Starting grid ==
Row	Inside		Middle		Outside	
1	28	(United States) Leon Duray	12	(United States) Pete DePaolo	6	(United States) Harry Hartz
2	2	(United States) Earl Cooper	1	(United States) Dave Lewis	17	(United States) Ralph Hepburn R
3	10	(United States) Jules Ellingboe	22	(Italy) Pietro Bordino R	38	(United States) Pete Kreis R
4	27	(United States) Frank Elliott	4	(United States) Tommy Milton W	5	(United States) Fred Comer
5	3	(United States) Bennett Hill	15	(United States) W. E. Shattuc R	24	(United States) Earl Devore R
6	23	(United States) Wade Morton	29	(United States) Herbert Jones R	8	(United States) Ralph DePalma W
7	19	(United States) Ira Vail	14	(United States) Bob McDonogh	7	(United States) Melville Jones R (*)
8	9	(United States) Phil Shafer R				

R Indianapolis 500 rookie
W Indianapolis 500 winner

Note: (*) Car qualified by Harold J. Skelly

== Race summary ==
The 1925 winning car

DePaolo jumped into the lead at the start, with Earl Cooper close behind. Phil Shafer led briefly, but DePaolo returned to the lead by half-distance. On lap 106, DePaolo came in for relief from Norman Batten while his bloody, blistered hands were bandaged. Dave Lewis then took over the lead in a front-wheel-drive Miller. The front wheels providing good grip in the turns, Lewis began to pull away. Batten soon pitted and DePaolo returned to the cockpit, and set his sights on Lewis.

At about 400 miles, Lewis began to slow, physically exhausted from the grind over the bricks. His crew called him in, but he overshot his pit stall and had to continue for another lap. When he finally stopped, crewmen lifted him out and Bennett Hill climbed in, now 1 1/2 laps behind DePaolo after the botched pit entry and eventual stop.

Hill sped after DePaolo, unlapping himself with about 25 laps to go and gaining several seconds with each lap. But DePaolo crossed the finish line with a record sub-5-hour 500 57 seconds ahead of Hill.

== Box score ==
Finish	Start	No	Name	Entrant	Car	Qual	Rank	Laps	Status
1	2	12	(United States) Peter DePaolo (Norman Batten Laps 106–127)	Duesenberg Brothers	Duesenberg	113.083	2	200	101.126 mph
2	5	1	(United States) Dave Lewis (Bennett Hill Laps 174–200)	R. Cliff Durant	Miller	109.061	5	200	+56.38
3	22	9	(United States) Phil Shafer R (Wade Morton Laps 160–200)	Duesenberg Brothers	Duesenberg	103.523	16	200	+2:47.32
4	3	6	(United States) Harry Hartz	Harry Hartz	Miller	112.433	3	200	+6:42.12
5	11	4	(United States) Tommy Milton W	Tommy Milton	Miller	104.366	13	200	+11:46.24
6	1	28	(United States) Leon Duray (Fred Comer Laps 105–155)	Harry Hartz	Miller	113.196	1	200	+12:54.64
7	18	8	(United States) Ralph DePalma W (L. L. Corum Laps 106–145)	Ralph DePalma	Miller	108.607	6	200	+13:06.59
8	9	38	(United States) Pete Kreis R (Norman Batten Laps 136–200)	Duesenberg Brothers	Duesenberg	106.338	10	200	+14:47.39
9	14	15	(United States) W. E. Shattuc R	Dr. W. E. Shattuc, M.D.	Miller	102.070	17	200	+16:41.01
10	8	22	(Italy) Pietro Bordino R (Antoine Mourre Laps 74–179)	Pietro Bordino	Fiat	107.661	9	200	+19:58.50
11	12	5	(United States) Fred Comer (Ira Vail Laps 86–132)	Harry Hartz	Miller	104.296	14	200	+23:36.13
12	10	27	(United States) Frank Elliott (Ora Haibe Laps 81–130)	Richard G. Doyle	Miller	104.910	11	200	+28:36.23
13	15	24	(United States) Earl Devore R (Glenn Shultz Laps 92–115) (L. L. Corum Laps 170–198)	Bancroft & Pope	Miller	97.799	19	198	Flagged
14	20	14	(United States) Bob McDonogh (Bennett Hill Laps 129–140)	Tommy Milton	Miller	101.931	18	188	Truss rod
15	16	23	(United States) Wade Morton (Jimmy Gleason Laps 110–156)	Duesenberg Brothers	Duesenberg	95.821	20	156	Crash BS
16	6	17	(United States) Ralph Hepburn R	Earl Cooper	Miller	108.489	7	144	Gas tank
17	4	2	(United States) Earl Cooper	R. Cliff Durant	Miller	110.487	4	127	Crash T1
18	13	3	(United States) Bennett Hill (Jules Ellingboe Laps 30–52) (Ray Cariens Laps 57–68) (Jerry Wunderlich Laps 69)	Harry A. Miller	Miller	104.167	15	69	Rear spring
19	17	29	(United States) Herbert Jones R (Alfred Moss Laps 13–58) (Alfred Moss Laps 66–68)	Herbert Jones	Miller	89.401	21	69	Crash T1
20	19	19	(United States) Ira Vail	R. J. Johnson	Miller	104.785	12	63	Rod
21	21	7	(United States) Melville Jones R (Fred Harder Laps 11–13)	H. J. Skelly	Fronty-Ford T	88.478	22	33	Transmission
22	7	10	(United States) Jules Ellingboe	Jerry Wunderlich	Miller	107.832	8	24	Steering

Note: Relief drivers in parentheses

W Former Indianapolis 500 winner

R Indianapolis 500 Rookie

=== Race statistics ===
Lap Leaders
Laps	Leader
1–54	Pete DePaolo
55–67	Phil Shafer
68–85	Pete DePaolo
86–88	Harry Hartz
89–104	Pete DePaolo
105–107	Dave Lewis
108–122	Ralph Hepburn
123–126	Earl Cooper
127–173	Dave Lewis
174–200	Pete DePaolo

Total laps led
Leader	Laps
Pete DePaolo	115
Dave Lewis	50
Ralph Hepburn	15
Phil Shafer	13
Earl Cooper	4
Harry Hartz	3

== Race details ==
- For 1925, riding mechanics were optional, however, no teams utilized them.
- First alternate: none
- Ralph DePalma would be the only driver in the race who had competed in the first Indy 500 in 1911.
- Though Pete DePaolo is widely recognized as the first driver to complete (and win) the Indianapolis 500 in under five hours (over 100 mph average speed), he was not eligible for the prestigious Champion Spark Plug 100 mph Club founded in 1935. Since DePaolo briefly received relief help from Norman Batten during the race, DePaolo failed the strict criteria for the club. He never managed to complete the full 500 miles again, and accomplish the feat solo.
- The race marked the first appearance of a front-wheel-drive car. Harry Miller built the car on the suggestion of driver Jimmy Murphy, who thought the concept would be quick on Indy's bricks while having less tire wear. The "Junior 8", without a driveshaft to the rear wheels, was only 36 inches tall, and a flyweight sub-1500 lbs. It showed its effectiveness and began a wave of front-drive cars for the next quarter-century. Murphy never got to drive it; he was killed in a crash at Syracuse the previous September. Miller hired Dave Lewis for the 500.

== Gallery ==
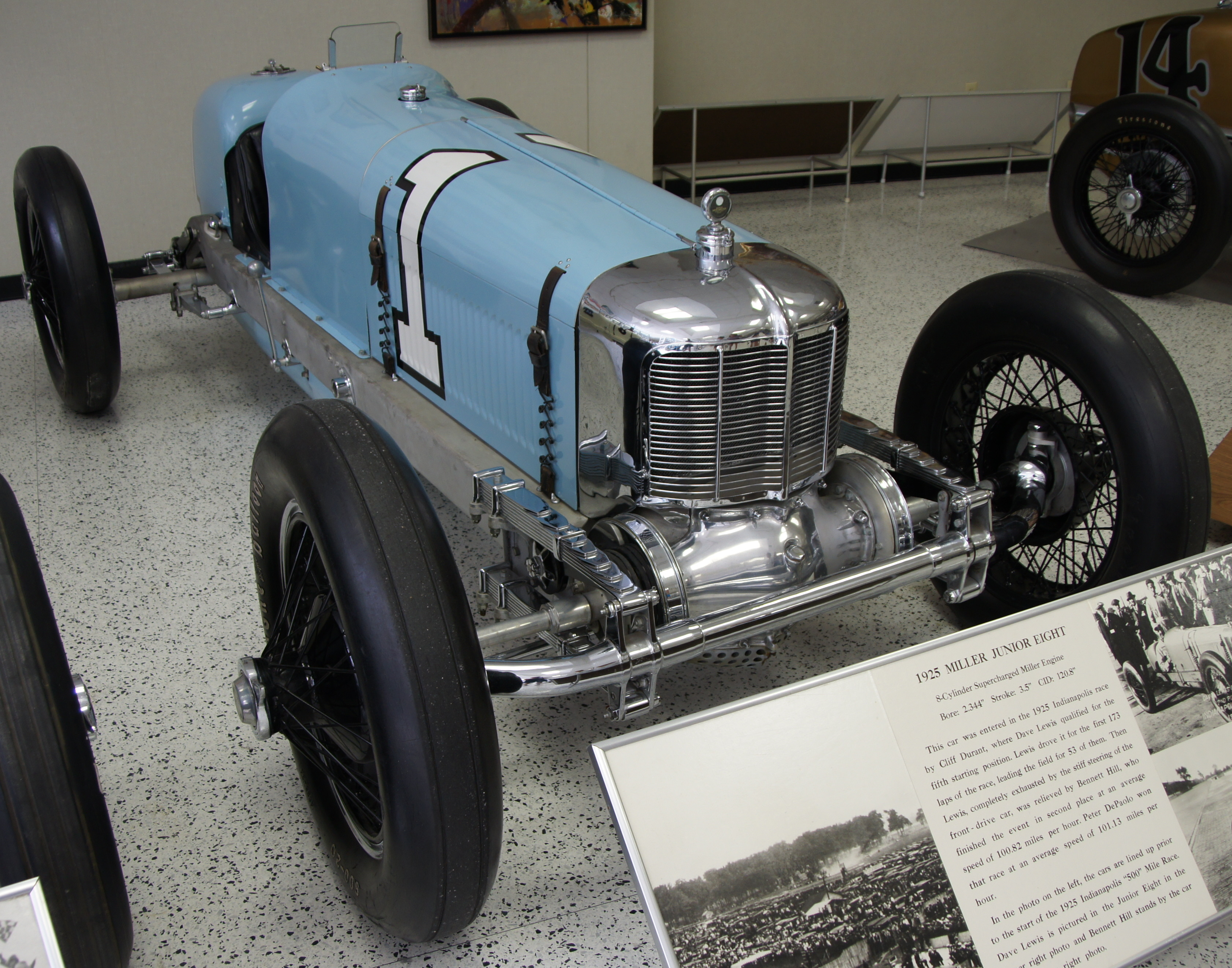
1925 Miller

1925 Indianapolis 500 pace car

Grand Prix Race
Previous race: 1924 Italian Grand Prix	1925 Grand Prix season Grandes Épreuves	Next race: 1925 Belgian Grand Prix
Previous race: 1924 Indianapolis 500	Indianapolis 500	Next race: 1926 Indianapolis 500

1924 Indianapolis 500; Lora L. Corum and Joe Boyer	1925 Indianapolis 500; Peter DePaolo	1926 Indianapolis 500; Frank Lockhart
Preceded by 98.234 mph (1924 Indianapolis 500)	Record for the fastest average speed 101.127 mph	Succeeded by 104.144 mph (1932 Indianapolis 500)
