= Melville Jones (racing driver) =

American racing driver (1901–1989)

- Born: Melville Corbidge Jones; April 26, 1901 Chicago, Illinois, U.S.
- Died: February 11, 1989 (aged 87) Elkhorn, Wisconsin, U.S.

Champ Car career
- 1 race run over 1 year
- First race: 1925 Indianapolis 500 (Indianapolis)
Wins	Podiums	Poles
0	0	0

Melville Corbidge Jones (often seen as M. C. Jones, April 26, 1901 – February 11, 1989) was an American racing driver.

== Motorsports career ==
Jones started in place of Harold J. Skelly in the 1925 Indianapolis 500. Skelly, the owner and qualifier of Jones' car, had planned to compete in the race himself, but was diagnosed with a heart ailment before the start of the race.

Jones took the start of the race, but was relieved twice by Fred Harder, the two drivers working to improve an ill-behaving car. Jones was driving the car when on Lap 33, its transmission failed.

== Motorsports career results ==
=== Indianapolis 500 results ===
Year	Car	Start	Qual	Rank	Finish	Laps	Led	Retired
1925	7	21	88.478	22	21	33	0	Transmission
Totals						33	0	

Starts	1
Poles	0
Front Row	0
Wins	0
Top 5	0
Top 10	0
Retired	1
