= Bennett Hill =

American racing driver (1893–1977)

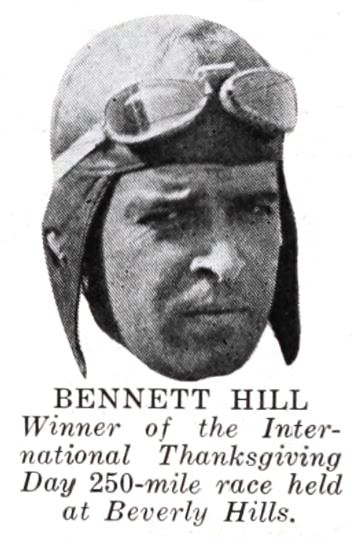
- Hill, circa 1924
- Born: John Bennett Hill; May 31, 1893 New York, New York, U.S.
- Died: December 9, 1977 (aged 84) Los Angeles, California, U.S.

Champ Car career
- 66 races run over 10 years
- Best finish: 3rd (1923, 1924)
- First race: 1919 Independence Auto Derby, Heat #1 (Uniontown)
- Last race: 1933 Indianapolis 500 (Indianapolis)
- First win: 1922 San Joaquin Valley Classic (Fresno)
- Last win: 1926 25-mile Heat #1 (Rockingham Park)
Wins	Podiums	Poles
5	16	7

John Bennett Hill (May 31, 1893 – December 9, 1977) was an American racing driver active in the 1920s and 1930s. In 1922, he won a 100-mile race in Berkeley. He made 66 AAA Championship Car starts, capturing five wins and seven poles.

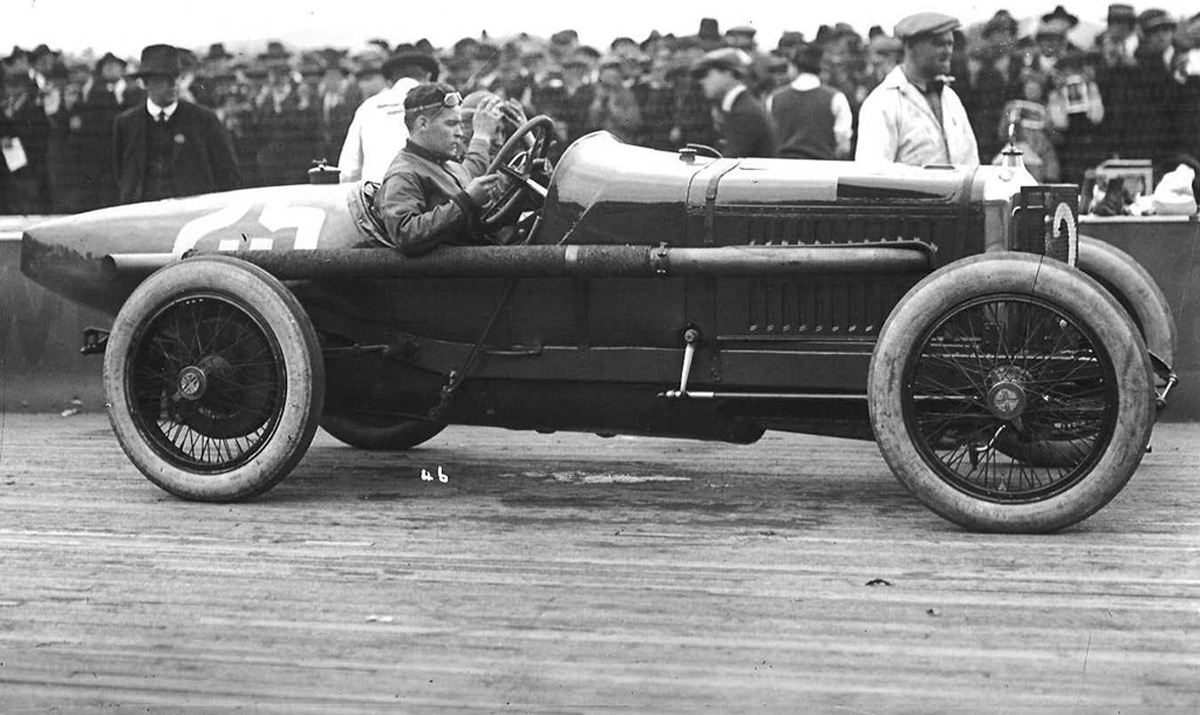
Hill at Beverly Hills Speedway in 1920

Hill was a specialist at board track racing — all his wins and poles were recorded on this type of track, which features a racing surface composed of wooden planks. He was credited with third place in the 1923 and 1924 national championships and fourth place in 1926. He started eight times in the Indianapolis 500 and started fifth in 1924 driving a Miller.

== Motorsports career results ==
=== Indianapolis 500 Results ===
Year	Car	Start	Qual	Rank	Finish	Laps	Led	Retired
1920	7	8	90.550	10	17	115	0	Crash T4
1921	21	15	79.13	15	8	200	0	Running
1923	35	18	91.200	16	19	44	0	Crankshaft
1924	9	5	104.840	5	18	176	0	Crash T1
1925	3	13	104.167	15	18	69	0	Rear spring
1926	16	7	105.876	7	12	136	0	Flagged
1927	4	9	112.013	10	28	26	0	Shackle bolt
1933	68	19	110.264	30	22	158	0	Rod
Totals						924	0	

Starts	8
Poles	0
Front Row	0
Wins	0
Top 5	0
Top 10	1
Retired	6

== Sources ==
Rick Popely with L. Spencer Riggs, Indianapolis 500 Chronicle
