= Pete Kreis =

American racing driver (1900–1934)

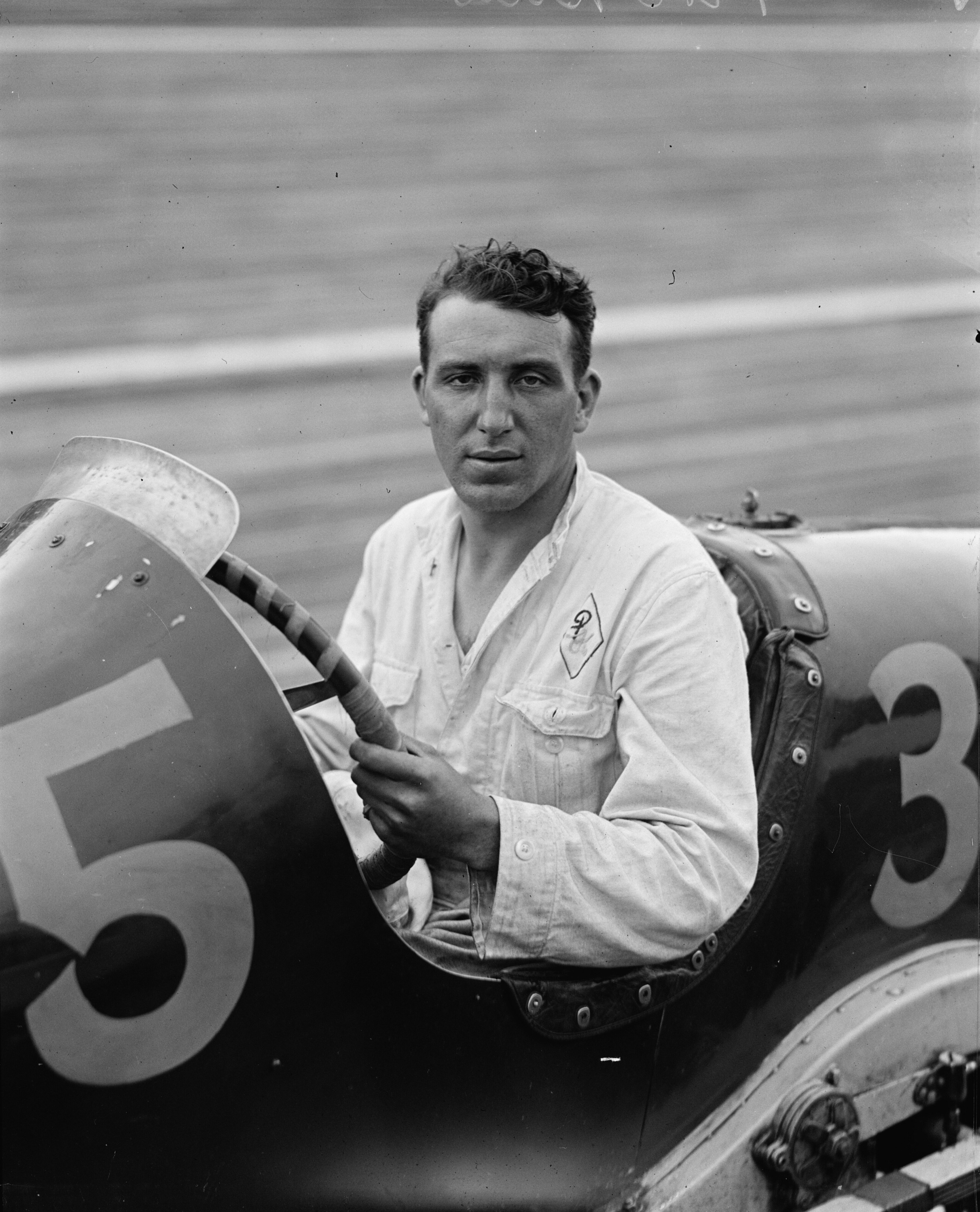
- Kreis, circa 1926
- Born: Albert Jacob Kreis; January 19, 1900 Knoxville, Tennessee, U.S.
- Died: May 25, 1934 (aged 34) Speedway, Indiana, U.S.

Champ Car career
- 27 races run over 10 years
- Best finish: 9th (1926)
- First race: 1925 Culver City 250 #1 (Culver City)
- Last race: 1933 Indianapolis 500 (Indianapolis)
Wins	Podiums	Poles
0	2	0

Albert Jacob "Pete" Kreis (January 19, 1900 – May 25, 1934) was an American racing driver. Kreis was a wealthy contractor who took a month off each year to drive in the 500.

== Death ==
Kreis and his riding mechanic Robert Hahn were killed while practicing for the 1934 Indianapolis 500. As they were coming out of the southwest turn, Kreis lost control of his front-drive car, which smashed into and mounted the outside wall and from there tumbled 15 feet (4.6 m) before hitting a tree. Kreis, who was thrown from the car, was killed instantly. Hahn died shortly thereafter.

== Motorsports career results ==
=== Indianapolis 500 results ===
Year	Car	Start	Qual	Rank	Finish	Laps	Led	Retired
1925	38	9	106.338	10	8	200	0	Running
1927	9	12	109.900	16	17	123	0	Front axle
1928	32	19	112.906	11	22	73	0	Rod bearing
1929	4	17	112.528	14	16	91	0	Engine seized
1932	18	17	110.270	29	15	178	0	Crash T1
1933	2	11	114.370	14	32	63	0	Universal joint
Totals						728	0	

Starts	6
Poles	0
Front Row	0
Wins	0
Top 5	0
Top 10	1
Retired	5
