= Pete DePaolo =

American racing driver (1898–1980)

Peter DePaolo
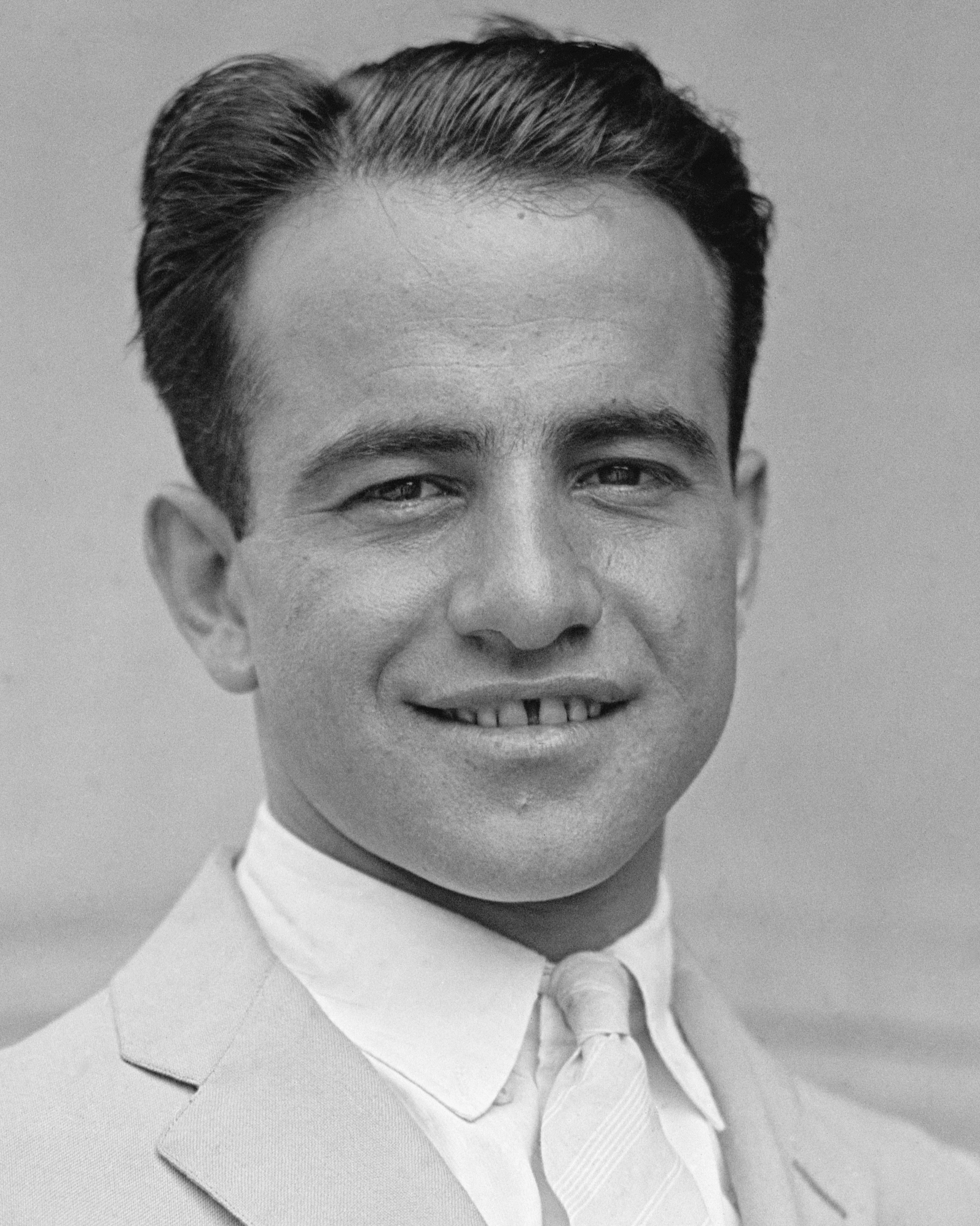
- DePaolo in 1925
- Born: Peter DePaolo; April 6, 1898 Philadelphia, Pennsylvania, U.S.
- Died: November 26, 1980 (aged 82) Laguna Hills, California, U.S.

Championship titles
- AAA Championship Car (1925, 1927); Major victories Indianapolis 500 (1925)

Champ Car career
- 55 races run over 10 years
- Best finish: 1st (1925, 1927)
- First race: 1922 Beverly Hills 250 #1 (Beverly Hills)
- Last race: 1930 Indianapolis 500 (Indianapolis)
- First win: 1925 Raisin Day Classic (Fresno)
- Last win: 1927 50-mile Semi-Final (Charlotte)
| Wins | Podiums | Poles |
|---|---|---|
| 10 | 21 | 5 |

Peter DePaolo (April 6, 1898 – November 26, 1980) was an American racing driver who is remembered as one of the greatest racers of his generation. He won the 1925 Indianapolis 500, and was a two-time National Champion, winning in 1925 and 1927.

== Early life ==
Peter DePaolo was born on April 6, 1898, in Philadelphia, Pennsylvania. Pete saw his first race in 1919, where he watched his uncle Ralph DePalma win from Pete's perch as DePalma's riding mechanic.

== Driving career ==
DePaolo drove in the 1922 Indianapolis 500, finishing fourth. He suffered his worst career injury at the Kansas City board track; his car rolled four times. He spent three weeks in the hospital with a severely cut up face and two lost teeth. Both men had been thrown from car and his riding mechanic Harry "Cotton" Henning pulled DePaolo from the car. Henning spent several months in the hospital with a broken ankle and broken ribs.

At the 1925 Indianapolis 500, DePaolo pulled out to a huge lead. DePaolo's strategy in the race was to run the left side tires in the oil slick on the middle the track for two laps then runs his right side tires in the oil slick for two laps. His fingers became badly blistered around the midpoint of the race, and car owner Fred Duesenberg pulled DePaolo out of the car in favor of Norman Batten. DePaolo had his hands repaired in the infield care center, and returned in the car after missing 21 laps. Although his car had dropped to fifth position, DePaolo won that race and was on his way to the series' driver's championship. It was the first Indianapolis 500 to average over 100 miles per hour (101.127 mph), and DePaolo became the first driver to average more than 100 miles per hour (160 km/h) at the Indianapolis 500, recording 101.13 miles per hour (162.75 km/h) in his Duesenberg, a record that would stand until 1932 when Fred Frame hit 104.14 miles per hour (167.60 km/h). DePaolo did not consider it his greatest win because he'd been relieved for 21 laps.

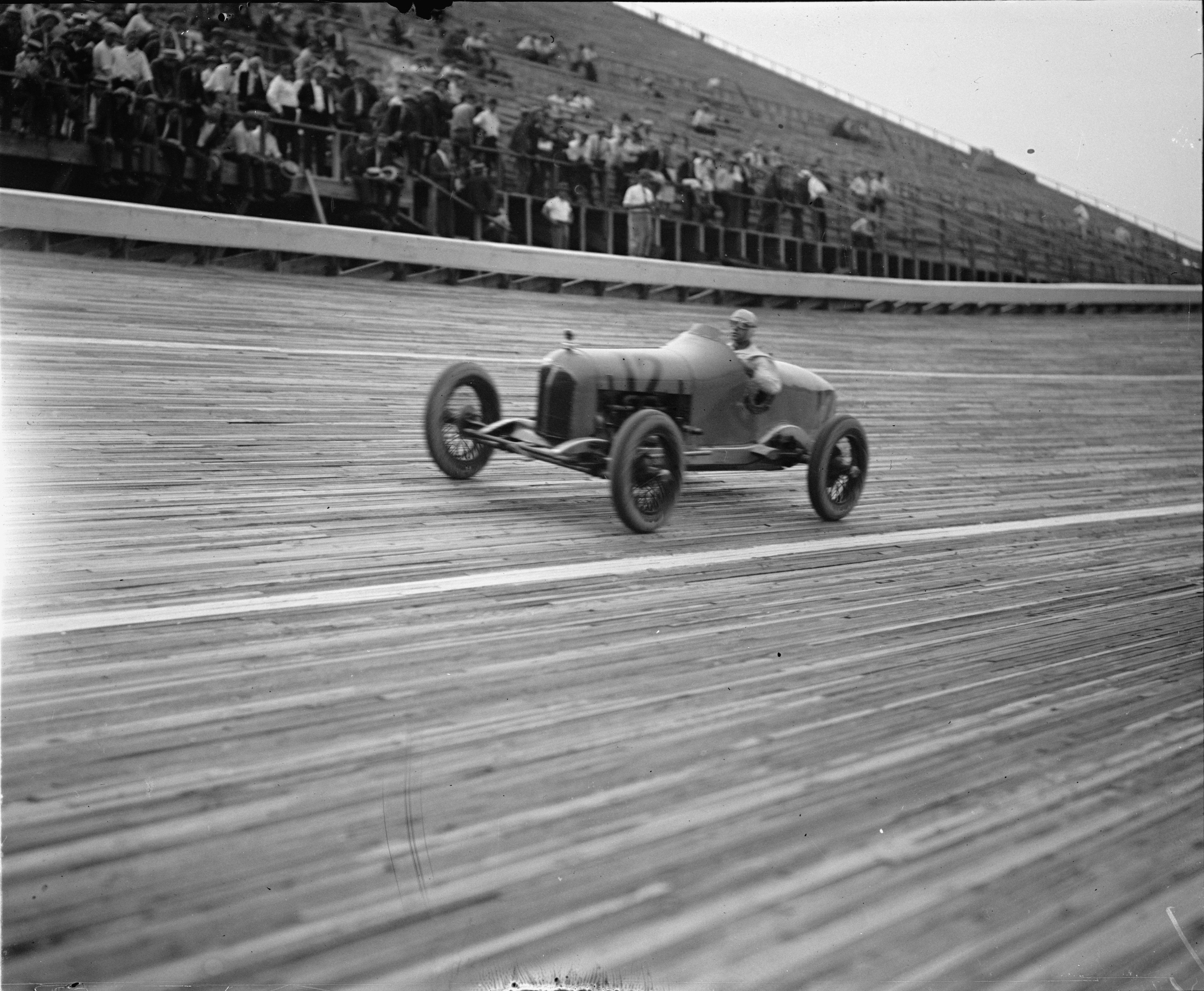
DePaolo racing in 1925

DePaolo founded his own team in 1927 and finished second in the 1927 Indianapolis 500, and added two wins on his way to the series' driver's championship.

In 1934, DePaolo drove the Harry Miller four-wheel-drive car in races throughout Europe and Africa. At the AVUS course, near Berlin, while leading the race in a downpour, his engine threw two connecting rods which narrowly missed hitting Adolf Hitler in his trackside box seat.

DePaolo announced his retirement on October 17, 1934 on the birthday of his son, Tommy. Following an accident at a race in Barcelona, Spain where he crashed into a curb rather than hit children playing in the streets, he fell unconscious. He remained unconscious for almost two weeks and on three occasions, it was believed he would not recover. He came through and decided to retire for his family rather than lose his life.

== Car owner ==
DePaolo was car owner and team manager for Kelly Petillo's 1935 Indianapolis 500 victory.

DePaolo was a successful NASCAR team owner from 1955 to 1957. His drivers finished second, third, and second in the final points standings during those seasons. His drivers accumulated 21 wins and 109 top-ten finishes in 178 starts. The team later became Holman-Moody.

== Writer ==
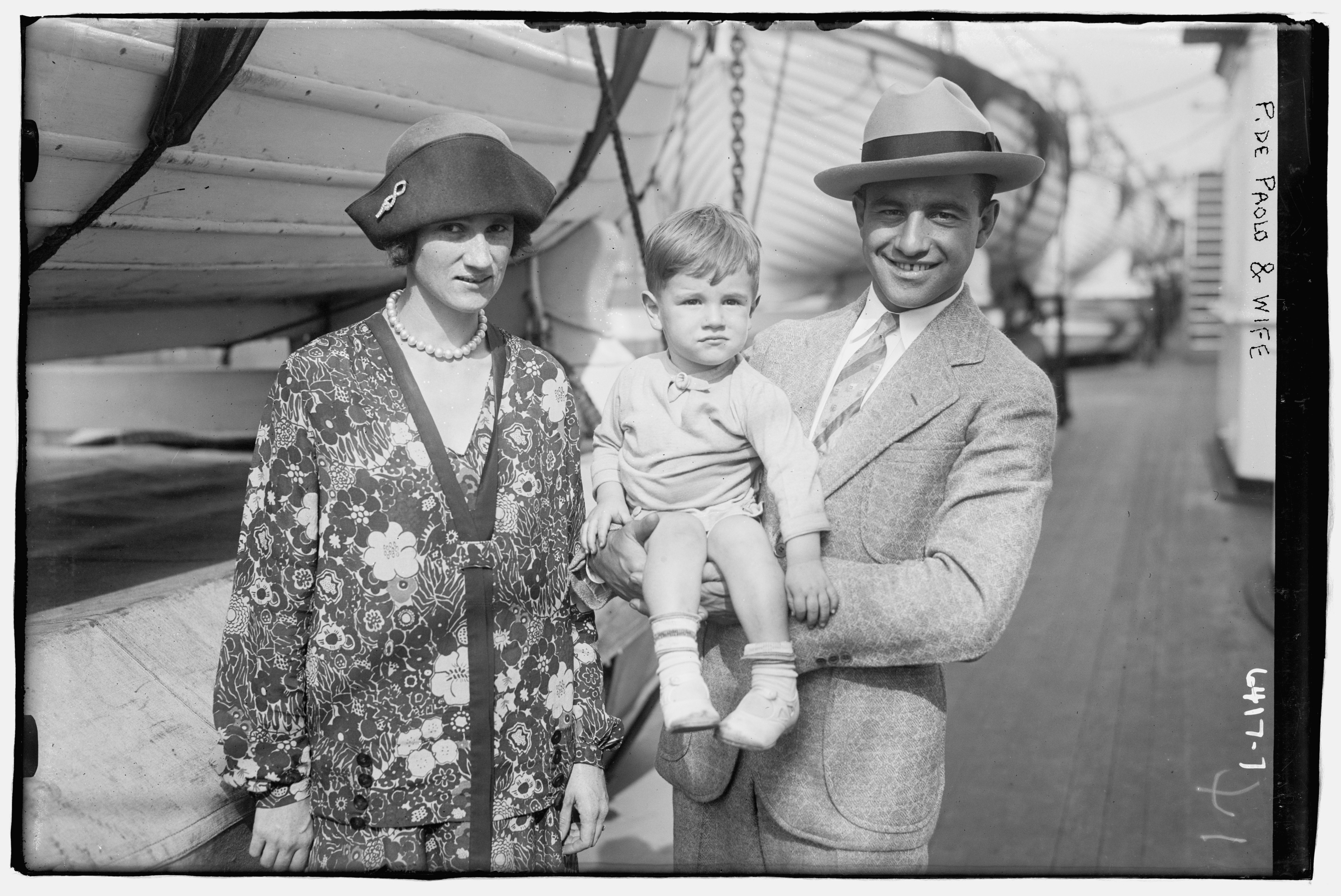
DePaolo with his wife

- DePaolo wrote his biography in the book Wall Smacker, published in 1935. In the book, he wrote that racing on a board track was "a great sensation, tearing around a board speedway dodging holes and flying timber."
- DePaolo was an Associate Editor at Speed Age magazine when he wrote an eight-part series "I Drove The Boards" from July 1951 through August 1952.

== Later life ==
DePaolo sang "Back Home Again in Indiana" prior to the start of the Indianapolis 500 in 1971, the only driver to do so as of 2025. He served as the Grand Marshall of the Bicentennial Parade in Roseland, New Jersey, in 1976, as he grew up in Roseland. DePaolo Court in Roseland is named after him.

DePaolo died on November 26, 1980, at age 82.

== Awards and honors ==
DePaolo has been inducted into the following halls of fame:

- Auto Racing Hall of Fame (1963)
- Motorsports Hall of Fame of America (1995)
- National Sprint Car Hall of Fame (1995)

DePaolo has been awarded the following honors:

- Automotive Hall of Fame Distinguished Service Citation (1969)

== Motorsports career results ==
=== Indianapolis 500 results ===
| Year | Car | Start | Qual | Rank | Finish | Laps | Led | Status |
|---|---|---|---|---|---|---|---|---|
| 1922 | 7 | 10 | 96.200 | 11 | 20 | 110 | 3 | Crash T3 |
| 1924 | 12 | 13 | 99.280 | 13 | 6 | 200 | 0 | Running |
| 1925 | 12 | 2 | 113.083 | 2 | 1 | 200 | 115 | Running |
| 1926 | 12 | 27 | 96.709 | 18 | 5 | 153 | 0 | Flagged |
| 1927 | 3 | 2 | 119.510 | 2 | 26 | 31 | 30 | Supercharger |
| 1928 | 1 | — | — | — | — | — | — | Practice crash |
| 1929 | 37 | 5 | 115.093 | 5 | 30 | 25 | 0 | Steering |
| 1930 | 5 | 21 | 99.956 | 19 | 33 | 19 | 0 | Crash T3 |
| Totals | | | | | | 738 | 148 | |

| Starts | 7 |
| Poles | 0 |
| Front Row | 2 |
| Wins | 1 |
| Top 5 | 2 |
| Top 10 | 3 |
| Retired | 4 |

| Preceded by Joe Boyer; L. L. Corum | Indianapolis 500 Winner; 1925 | Succeeded by Frank Lockhart |
