= 1924 AAA Championship Car season =

Auto racing season

- AAA National Championship Trail

Season
- Races: 9
- Start date: February 24
- End date: December 14

Awards
- National champion: (United States) Jimmy Murphy
- Indianapolis 500 winner: (United States) Joe Boyer (United States) L. L. Corum

The 1924 AAA Championship Car season consisted of 9 races, beginning at Beverly Hills, California on February 24, and concluding at Culver City, California on December 14. The AAA National Champion was posthumously won by Jimmy Murphy. The Indianapolis 500 co-winners were Joe Boyer and L. L. Corum - the first of two occasions where co-winners were awarded a victory.

The 1924 season suffered three fatal accidents. Joe Boyer at the Altoona Race on September 1. On September 15, Jimmy Murphy - winner of both the Indianapolis 500 and the National Championship in 1922 - perished at Syracuse. On October 16, Ernie Ansterburg died at Charlotte during a practice run. Murphy won the championship posthumously after Earl Cooper failed to win at Culver City, the final race of the season.

== Schedule and results ==
All races running on Dirt/Brick/Board Oval.

| Rnd | Date | Race name | Track | Location | Type | Pole position | Winning driver |
|---|---|---|---|---|---|---|---|
| 1 | February 24 | (United States) Beverly Hills Race - 250 | Los Angeles Motor Speedway | Beverly Hills, California | Board | (United States) Phil Shafer | (United States) Harlan Fengler |
| 2 | May 30 | (United States) International 500 Mile Sweepstakes | Indianapolis Motor Speedway | Speedway, Indiana | Brick | (United States) Jimmy Murphy | (United States) Joe Boyer |
| 2 | May 30 | (United States) International 500 Mile Sweepstakes | Indianapolis Motor Speedway | Speedway, Indiana | Brick | (United States) Jimmy Murphy | (United States) L. L. Corum^{A} |
| 3 | June 14 | (United States) Altoona Race - 250 | Altoona Speedway | Tyrone, Pennsylvania | Board | (United States) Ira Vail | (United States) Jimmy Murphy |
| 4 | July 4 | (United States) Kansas City Race - 150 | Kansas City Speedway | Kansas City, Missouri | Board | (United States) Tommy Milton | (United States) Jimmy Murphy |
| 5 | September 1 | (United States) Fall Classic - 250 | Altoona Speedway | Tyrone, Pennsylvania | Board | (United States) Ray Cariens | (United States) Jimmy Murphy |
| 6 | September 15 | (United States) Syracuse Race - 150 | New York State Fairgrounds | Syracuse, New York | Dirt | (United States) Norman Batten | (United States) Phil Shafer |
| 7 | October 3 | (United States) Raisin Day Classic - 150 | Fresno Speedway | Fresno, California | Board | (United States) Fred Comer | (United States) Earl Cooper |
| 8 | October 25 | (United States) Charlotte Race - 250 | Charlotte Speedway | Pineville, North Carolina | Board | (United States) Bennett Hill | (United States) Tommy Milton |
| 9 | December 14 | (United States) Culver City Race - 250 | Culver City Speedway | Culver City, California | Board | — | (United States) Bennett Hill |

^A Shared drive

== Final points standings ==
- Note 1: Joe Boyer started the No. 9 car during the Indianapolis 500, but dropped out early with mechanical issues. On lap 112, he relieved L. L. Corum in the No. 15 car, and went on to finish first. While both Boyer and Corum were recognized as co-winners - the first of two such occasions in Indianapolis 500 history - the winner's points went to Corum, who started and qualified the No. 15 car.
- Note 2: Drivers had to be running at the finish to score points. Points scored by drivers sharing a ride were split according to percentage of race driven. Starters were not allowed to score points as relief drivers, if a race starter finished the race in another car, in a points scoring position, those points were awarded to the driver who had started the car.
- Final standings based upon reference:

| Pos | Driver | BEV (United States) | INDY (United States) | ALT1 (United States) | KAN (United States) | ALT2 (United States) | SYR (United States) | FRE (United States) | CHA (United States) | CUL (United States) | Pts |
|---|---|---|---|---|---|---|---|---|---|---|---|
| 1 | (United States) Jimmy Murphy | 7 | **3** | 1* | 1 | 1* | 6 | | | | 1595 |
| 2 | (United States) Earl Cooper | 8* | 2 | 6 | 5 | 5 | 5 | 1* | 2 | 16 | 1240 |
| 3 | (United States) Bennett Hill | 4 | 5 | DNQ | 3 | 14 | 2 | 2 | **3** | 1 | 1214 |
| 4 | (United States) Tommy Milton | 5 | 21 | 7 | **2** | 3 | 8 | 3 | 1 | 3 | 1101 |
| 5 | (United States) Fred Comer | 14 | 7 | 2 | 12 | 2 | 4 | **4** | 8 | 4 | 725 |
| 6 | (United States) Harry Hartz | 3 | 4 | 5 | 6 | 10 | 11 | 8 | 5 | 2 | 666 |
| 7 | (United States) L. L. Corum | | 1 | 8 | 11 | | | | | | 570 |
| 8 | (United States) Harlan Fengler | 1* | DNQ | | 4 | 7 | | 10 | 12 | Wth | 563 |
| 9 | (United States) Phil Shafer | **11** | 13 | | | 4 | 1* | 7 | 7 | 7 | 430 |
| 10 | (United States) Jerry Wunderlich | 2 | 12 | DNQ | | | | 13 | 6 | 13 | 295 |
| 11 | (United States) Peter DePaolo | | 6 | DNQ | 10 | 12 | 3 | 11 | 4 | 12 | 230 |
| 12 | (France) Antoine Mourre RY | 16 | 9 | 3 | 7 | 6 | | 9 | | 15 | 225 |
| 13 | (United States) Bob McDonogh R | | 10 | 4 | 9 | 9 | 9 | 5 | 9 | 10 | 160 |
| 14 | (United States) W. E. Shattuc R | | | | | | | | | 5 | 50 |
| 15 | (United States) Eddie Hearne | 6 | 19 | Wth | | | | | | 9 | 45 |
| 16 | (United States) Stuart Wilkinson R | | | | | | | | | 6 | 35 |
| 17 | (United States) Ira Vail | 17 | 8 | **9** | 16 | | 10 | | | | 34 |
| 18 | (United States) Ernie Ansterburg | 12 | 22 | 10 | 15* | 13 | DNS | 6 | DNQ | | 25 |
| 19 | (United States) Ray Cariens R | | | | | **8** | | | | | 15 |
| 20 | (Kingdom of Italy) Pietro Bordino | | | | | | | | | 8 | 15 |
| 21 | (United States) Wade Morton | 17 | 7 | 11 | 8 | | | 12 | 10 | 14 | 14 |
| 22 | (United States) Joe Boyer | 9 | 18 | DNQ | 13 | 11 | | | | | 10 |
| 23 | (United States) Cornelius Van Ranst | | 8 | | | | | | | | 8 |
| 24 | (United States) Louis Wilson | | | 9 | 16 | | | | | | 8 |
| 25 | (United States) Cliff Durant | 10 | 13 | | | | | | | DNQ | 5 |
| - | (United States) Norman Batten R | | | | | | **7** | | | | 0 |
| - | (United States) Frank Elliott | 15 | 20 | DNQ | 14 | | | | 11 | DNQ | 0 |
| - | (United States) Jules Ellingboe | | 11 | | | | | | | | 0 |
| - | (United States) Ralph DePalma | | | | | | | | | 11 | 0 |
| - | (United States) Ralph Hepburn R | 13 | | | | | | | | | 0 |
| - | (United States) Bill Hunt R | | 14 | | | | | | | | 0 |
| - | (United States) Elmer Dempsey R | | 15 | | DNQ | | | | | | 0 |
| - | (United States) Ora Haibe | | 15 | | DNQ | | | | | | 0 |
| - | (United Kingdom) Alfred Moss R | | 16 | | | | | | | | 0 |
| - | (United States) Fred Harder R | | 17 | | | | | | | | 0 |
| - | (United States) Thane Houser | | 18 | | | | | | | | 0 |
| - | (United States) Tom Alley | | DNQ | DNS | | | | | | | 0 |
| - | (United States) Wally Butler | | DNQ | | | | | | | | 0 |
| - | (United States) Calvin Hartley | | DNQ | | | | | | | | 0 |
| - | (Denmark) C. J. Ramsey | | DNQ | | | | | | | | 0 |
| - | (Kingdom of Italy) Giovanni Rossi | | DNQ | | | | | | | | 0 |
| - | (United States) Charles Shambaugh | | DNQ | | | | | | | | 0 |
| - | (United States) Herbert Scheel | | DNQ | | | | | | | | 0 |
| - | (United States) Harry Thicksten | | DNQ | | | | | | | | 0 |
| - | (United States) Hollis Wells | | DNQ | | | | | | | | 0 |
| - | (United States) Pete Kreis | | | | | | | | | DNQ | 0 |
| - | (United States) Ralph Mulford | | | | | | | | | DNS | 0 |
| Pos | Driver | BEV (United States) | INDY (United States) | ALT1 (United States) | KAN (United States) | ALT2 (United States) | SYR (United States) | FRE (United States) | CHA (United States) | CUL (United States) | Pts |

| Color | Result |
|---|---|
| Gold | Winner |
| Silver | 2nd place |
| Bronze | 3rd place |
| Green | 4th & 5th place |
| Light Blue | 6th-10th place |
| Dark Blue | Finished (Outside Top 10) |
| Purple | Did not finish (Ret) |
| Red | Did not qualify (DNQ) |
| Brown | Withdrawn (Wth) |
| Black | Disqualified (DSQ) |
| White | Did not start (DNS) |
| Blank | Did not participate (DNP) |
| Blank | Not competing |

**In-line notation**
| **Bold** | Pole position |
| Italics | Ran fastest race lap |
| * | Led most race laps |
Rookie of the Year
Rookie

== See also ==
- 1924 Indianapolis 500
