= 1899 in motorsport =

The following is an overview of the events of 1899 in motorsport including the major racing events, motorsport venues that were opened and closed during a year, championships and non-championship events that were established and disestablished in a year, and births and deaths of racing drivers and other motorsport people.

== Births ==
Date	Month	Name	Nationality	Occupation	Note	Ref
6	January	Raymond Mays	British	Racing driver	One of the first British Formula One drivers.	
8	January	Lora L. Corum	American	Racing driver	Indianapolis 500 winner (1924).	
23	January	Glen Kidston	British	Racing driver	24 Hours of Le Mans winner (1930).	
3	August	Louis Chiron	Monegasque	Racing driver	The first Monegasque Formula One driver. 1931 French Grand Prix winner.	
