= Cotati Speedway =

Auto racing track (1921–1922)

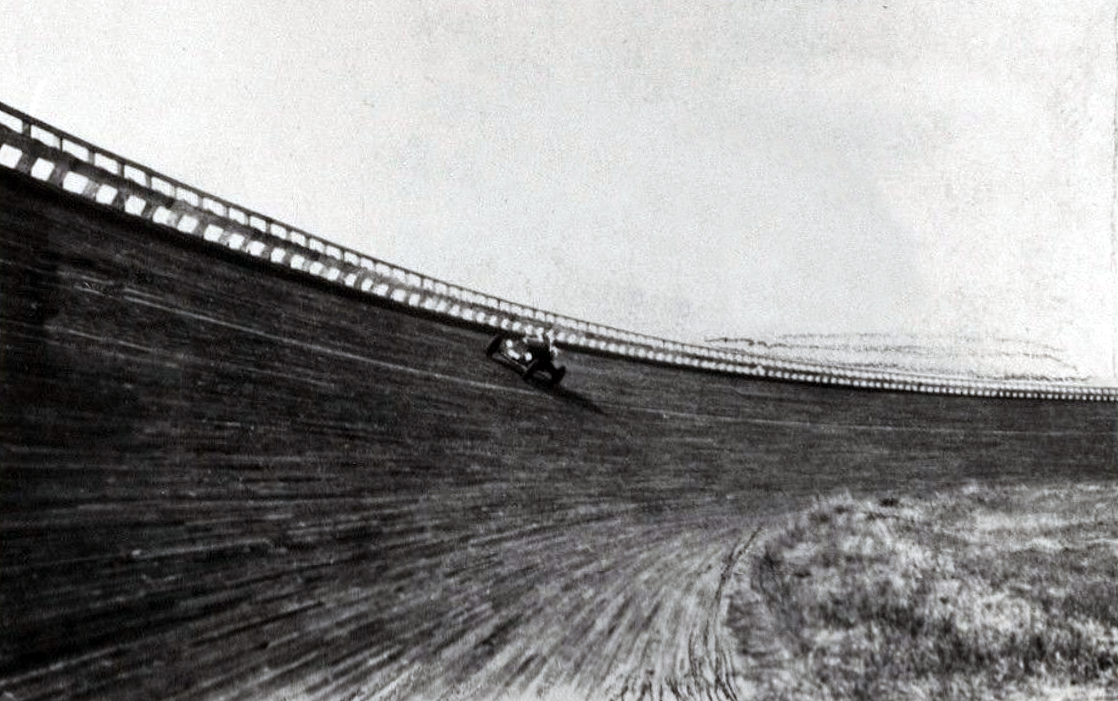
- A 1922 photograph, showing the steep banking on the track

- Circuit map
- Location: Cotati, California, United States
- Coordinates: 38.327°N 122.692°W
- Owner: Cotati Speedway Association
- Broke ground: April 24, 1921
- Opened: July 31, 1921
- Closed: December 1922
- Construction cost: c. $100,000

Oval
- Surface: Wooden boards
- Length: 1.25 miles (2.01 km)
- Turns: 4
- Banking: Turns: 41.5° Straights: 10°

The Cotati Speedway was a 1.25-mile (2.01 km) wooden board track for automobile racing in Cotati, California. The track was built and opened in 1921, and featured heavily banked turns, which were around 41.5° at their steepest. It hosted six AAA Championship Car races across 1921 and 1922. Despite the popularity of the sport, the Cotati Speedway failed to attract the size of crowds the organisers had hoped for, partly due to the track's location. In December 1922, primarily for financial reasons, the track was shut down. Despite attempts by some locals to save the track, it was dismantled the following year, with much of the timber reclaimed and sold for other projects.

== Development and construction ==
American motorsport boomed in the early twentieth century. Initially, most racing was conducted either on the streets, or on dirt tracks. In 1910, the Los Angeles Motordrome was built; a one-mile (1.6 km) wooden board race track, based on cycling velodromes. Racing on the track proved both fast and popular, and although the track burned down in 1913, many more wooden tracks followed over the next decade or so.

The Los Angeles Motordrome had been built by Jack Prince, who had advanced from building cycling velodromes that were typically no more than 1/6 mile (0.27 km) lap length, to motorcycle tracks going up to 1/3 mile (0.54 km) to tracks large enough for automobiles. After building the Los Angeles track, he was in high demand; between 1910 and 1926, Prince was involved in the construction of 17 wooden board tracks across the United States. In early 1921, the North Bay Counties Fair Association purchased 135 acres (55 ha) of land in Cotati, California and contracted Prince to build a speedway at the site. The plans, which also included buildings to host county fairs, were expected to cost $250,000 (roughly equivalent to $4.4 million in 2024), and were hoped to be ready for races in June that year.

The site chosen for the race track was next to the Northwestern Pacific Railroad (now Sonoma–Marin Area Rail Transit) to the south of East Cotati Avenue, which provided the main access. The location met Prince's key criteria for placement of a track; it was near a railway, had a local supply of timber, and a local community willing to fund the project. To raise money for the construction, the Fair Association applied to local government for money and also sold life membership tickets for $100 ($1,520) each, which entitled the holder to free entry to all events at the track. A groundbreaking ceremony was held on Sunday April 24, 1921, which featured a range of entertainments and attracted around 8,000 attendees. Work began on the track the next day; around 150 carpenters were employed for the construction, which used over 3,000,000 feet (910,000 m) of timber, and 68 short tons (62 t) of nails. The track surface consisted of 2 by 3 ft (61 by 91 cm) planks laid on their sides to create a smooth finish.

To allow fast racing, the track was banked throughout. On the straights, the track had a 10° slope, while it was reported to be as steep as 41.5° on the bends. In comparison, the steepest banking on the 2023 IndyCar Series calendar is the Texas Motor Speedway, which has 24° banking, partly because IndyCar has moved away from ovals with steep banking due to safety concerns. The Talladega Superspeedway, used for NASCAR races, features 33° banking, while the Circuit Zandvoort, used in Formula One, has 18° banking. Steeper banking did feature at AVUS, another track used in Formula One, where the notoriously dangerous Nord Kehre was 43°. Some of Prince's other board tracks, such as the Atlantic City Speedway, featured banking as steep as 45°.

== Operational history ==
Initially, the first race at the track was planned for August 7, but just over a month before, it was rescheduled by a week to August 14. The race received sanctioning from the American Automobile Association (AAA), and promotional articles in the local press listed famous racing drivers who might take part, and an oft-repeated claim from Prince that the track would be so fast that new world records would be set on it. Cars started arriving for the race in early July, before the track had even been finished. On July 27, Joe Thomas, who had won two championship races earlier that season, drove some laps of the track, achieving a speed of 111 miles per hour (179 km/h). A few days later, on Sunday July 31, elimination trials were carried out. The local press reported that between 10,000 and 15,000 people attended, to watch seven drivers attempt to achieve the 100 miles per hour (160 km/h) speed required to qualify for the race. Two weeks later, the inaugural race took place in front of a crowd of between 20,000 and 30,000 people. Eddie Hearne won the 150 miles (240 km) event in a time of 1:21:19.2, setting new records over 25, 100 and 150 miles (40, 161 and 241 km).

The Speedway subsequently hosted the North Bay County Fair in late August 1921, which closed with a series of motorcycle races on the track, during which Otto Walker set a 25-mile (40 km) record.

== Race history ==
=== Winners ===
AAA Championship Car race winners at Cotati Speedway
Season	Date	Driver	Car	Distance
1921	August 14	(United States) Eddie Hearne	Duesenberg	150 miles (240 km)
1921	October 23	(United States) Roscoe Sarles	Duesenberg	150 miles (240 km)
1922	May 7	(United States) Jimmy Murphy	Duesenberg–Miller	100 miles (160 km)
1922	May 7	(Italy) Pietro Bordino	Fiat 802	50 miles (80 km)
1922	August 6	(United States) Frank Elliott	Miller	100 miles (160 km)
1922	August 6	(United States) Frank Elliott	Miller	50 miles (80 km)

== Bibliography ==
- Ball, Larry L. Jr (2003). "John Shillington "Jack" Prince" (PDF). Knoxville, Iowa: National Sprint Car Hall of Fame.
- Borgeson, Griffith (1998). The Golden Age of the American Racing Car. Warrendale, Pennsylvania: Society of Automotive Engineers. ISBN 0-7680-0023-8.
- Draper, Prue (2002). "The Cotati Speedway". Sonoma Historian. 2. Sonoma County Historical Society: 12–16.
