= Antoine Mourre =

French racing driver (1888–1953)

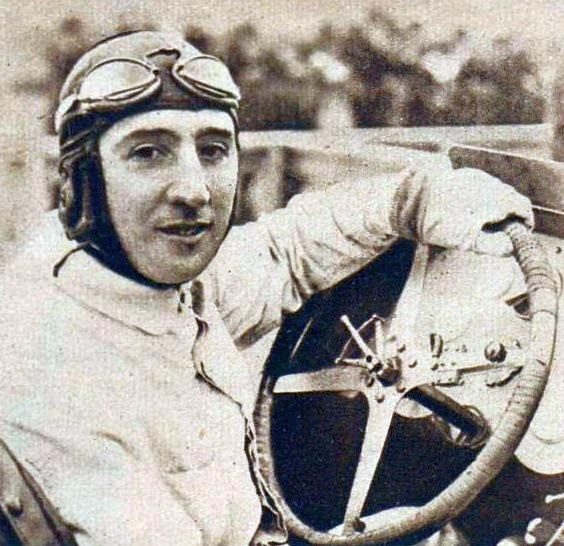
- Mourre in the 1920s
- Born: Justin Louis Antoine Vital Mourre; 26 September 1888 Menton, Alpes-Maritimes, France
- Died: 8 October 1953 (aged 65) Givry, Yonne, France

Champ Car career
- 7 races run over 1 year
- Best finish: 12th (1924)
- First race: 1924 Beverly Hills 250 (Beverly Hills)
- Last race: 1924 Culver City 250 (Culver City)
Wins	Podiums	Poles
0	1	0

Justin Louis Antoine Vital Mourre (26 September 1888 – 8 October 1953) was a French racing driver. One of the few European drivers of the period to compete on the regular American Indy car circuit, consisting largely of board ovals, he competed in seven events during the 1924 U.S. racing season.

== Motorsports career results ==
=== Indianapolis 500 results ===
Year	Car	Start	Qual	Rank	Finish	Laps	Led	Retired
1924	32	9	99.490	9	9	200	0	Running
Totals						200	0	

Starts	1
Poles	0
Front Row	0
Wins	0
Top 5	0
Top 10	1
Retired	0
