= Ernie Ansterburg =

American racing driver (1891–1924)

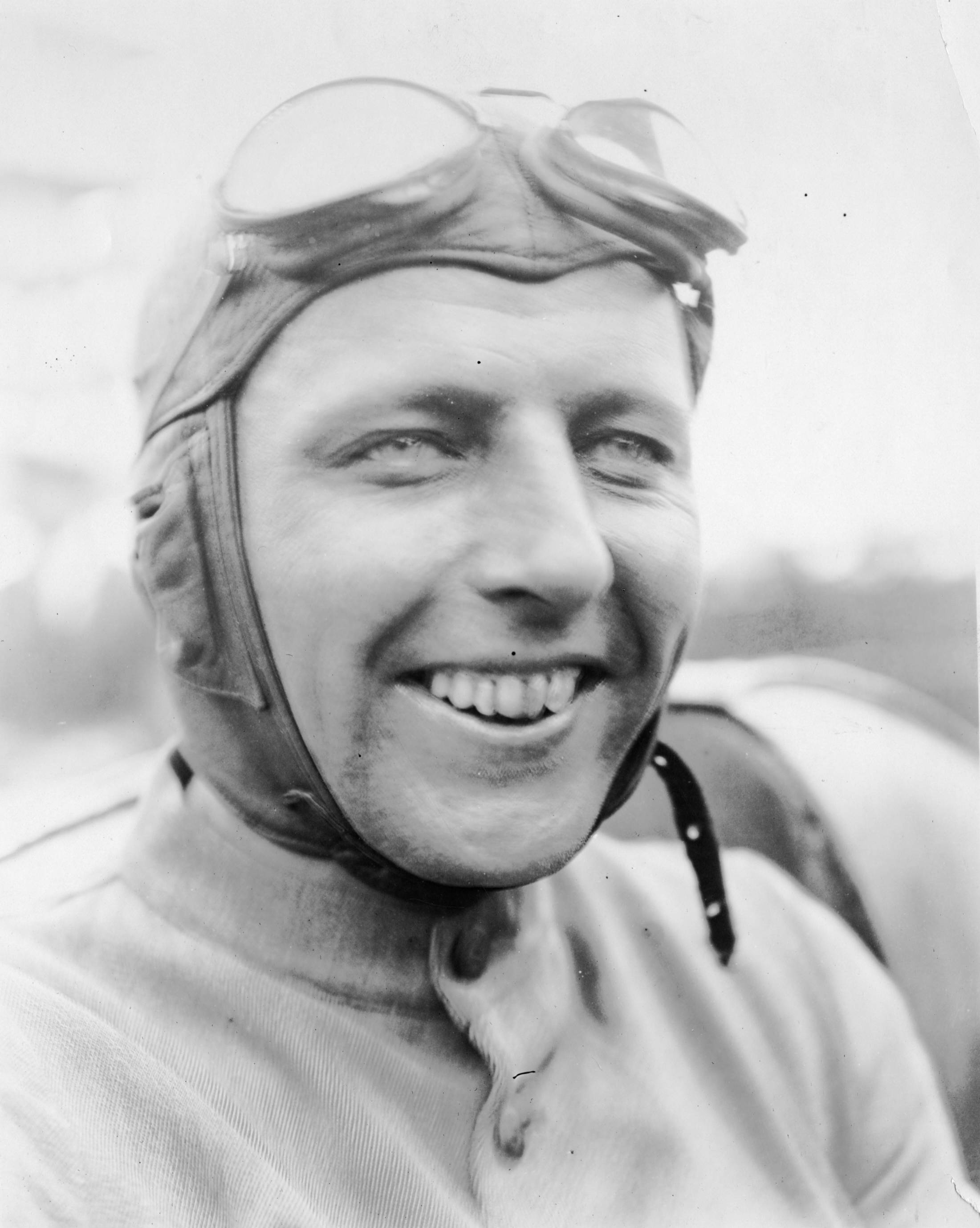
- Ansterburg at Tacoma Speedway in 1922
- Born: Ernest Putnam Ansterburg; October 1, 1891 Concord, Michigan, U.S.
- Died: October 16, 1924 (aged 33) Charlotte, North Carolina, U.S.

Champ Car career
- 7 races run over 2 years
- Best finish: 18th (1924)
- First race: 1923 Beverly Hills 250 #2 (Beverly Hills)
- Last race: 1924 Raisin Day Classic (Fresno)
Wins	Podiums	Poles
0	0	0

Ernest Putnam Ansterburg (October 1, 1891 – October 16, 1924) was an American racing driver.

== Death ==
Ansterburg was fatally injured on a practice lap at Charlotte Speedway in North Carolina on October 16, 1924. He was ejected from his car when it crashed into the upper guardrail ahead of the track's inaugural race. Mechanical investigation showed the accident was caused by a broken front suspension. Ansterburg died on the way to the hospital.

== Motorsports career results ==
=== Indianapolis 500 results ===
Year	Car	Start	Qual	Rank	Finish	Laps	Led	Retired
1924	10	10	99.400	10	22	2	0	Crash T2
Totals						2	0	

Starts	1
Poles	0
Front Row	0
Wins	0
Top 5	0
Top 10	0
Retired	1
