= 1922 AAA Championship Car season =

Auto racing season

- AAA National Championship Trail

Season
- Races: 18
- Start date: March 5
- End date: December 13

Awards
- National champion: (United States) Jimmy Murphy
- Indianapolis 500 winner: (United States) Jimmy Murphy

The 1922 AAA Championship Car season consisted of 18 races, beginning in Beverly Hills, California on March 5 and concluding in the same location on December 13. There were also 2 non-championship races. The AAA National Champion and Indianapolis 500 winner was Jimmy Murphy.

Roscoe Sarles died at Kansas City Speedway on September 17.

== Schedule and results ==
All races running on Dirt/Brick/Board Oval.

| Rnd | Date | Race name | Track | Location | Type | Pole position | Winning driver |
|---|---|---|---|---|---|---|---|
| 1 | March 5 | (United States) Beverly Hills Race 1 - 250 | Los Angeles Motor Speedway | Beverly Hills, California | Board | — | (United States) Tommy Milton |
| 2 | April 2 | (United States) Beverly Hills Heat 1 - 25 | Los Angeles Motor Speedway | Beverly Hills, California | Board | — | (Italy) Pietro Bordino |
| 3 | April 2 | (United States) Beverly Hills Heat 2 - 25 | Los Angeles Motor Speedway | Beverly Hills, California | Board | — | (United States) Tommy Milton |
| 4 | April 2 | (United States) Beverly Hills Heat 3 - 25 | Los Angeles Motor Speedway | Beverly Hills, California | Board | (United States) Frank Elliott | (United States) Jimmy Murphy |
| 5 | April 2 | (United States) Beverly Hills Heat 4 - 25 | Los Angeles Motor Speedway | Beverly Hills, California | Board | — | (United States) Frank Elliott |
| 6 | April 2 | (United States) Beverly Hills Main - 50 | Los Angeles Motor Speedway | Beverly Hills, California | Board | (United States) Frank Elliott | (United States) Tommy Milton |
| 7 | April 16 | (United States) Golden State Motor Derby - 150 | San Francisco Speedway | San Carlos, California | Board | — | (United States) Harry Hartz |
| 8 | April 27 | (United States) Raisin Day Classic - 150 | Fresno Speedway | Fresno, California | Board | — | (United States) Jimmy Murphy |
| 9 | May 7 | (United States) Cotati Race 1 - 100 | Cotati Speedway | Santa Rosa, California | Board | — | (United States) Jimmy Murphy |
| 10 | May 7 | (United States) Cotati Race 2 - 50 | Cotati Speedway | Santa Rosa, California | Board | — | (Italy) Pietro Bordino |
| 11 | May 30 | (United States) International 500 Mile Sweepstakes | Indianapolis Motor Speedway | Speedway, Indiana | Brick | (United States) Jimmy Murphy | (United States) Jimmy Murphy |
| NC | June 14 | (United States) San Carlos Race - 150 | San Francisco Speedway | San Carlos, California | Board | — | (United States) Joe Thomas |
| 12 | June 17 | (United States) 7th Annual Universal Trophy Race - 225 | Uniontown Speedway | Hopwood, Pennsylvania | Board | (United States) Jimmy Murphy | (United States) Jimmy Murphy |
| 13 | July 4 | (United States) Tacoma Montamarathon - 250 | Tacoma Speedway | Tacoma, Washington | Board | (United States) Jimmy Murphy | (United States) Tommy Milton |
| 14 | August 6 | (United States) Cotati Race 3 - 100 | Cotati Speedway | Santa Rosa, California | Board | — | (United States) Frank Elliott |
| 15 | August 6 | (United States) Cotati Race 4 - 50 | Cotati Speedway | Santa Rosa, California | Board | — | (United States) Frank Elliott |
| NC | September 16 | (United States) Syracuse Race - 50 | New York State Fairgrounds | Syracuse, New York | Dirt | — | (United States) Tom Alley |
| 16 | September 17 | (United States) Kansas City Race - 300 | Kansas City Speedway | Kansas City, Missouri | Board | (United States) Bennett Hill | (United States) Tommy Milton |
| 17 | September 30 | (United States) San Joaquin Valley Classic - 150 | Fresno Speedway | Fresno, California | Board | (United States) Art Klein | (United States) Bennett Hill |
| 18 | December 3 | (United States) Beverly Hills Race 7 - 250 | Los Angeles Motor Speedway | Beverly Hills, California | Board | (United States) Al Melcher | (United States) Jimmy Murphy |

Non-championship race

== Final points standings ==
- Note 1: Pietro Bordino was not eligible for points.
- Note 2: Drivers had to be running at the finish to score points. Points scored by drivers sharing a ride were split according to percentage of race driven. Starters were not allowed to score points as relief drivers, if a race starter finished the race in another car, in a points scoring position, those points were awarded to the driver who had started the car.
- The final standings based on reference.

| Pos | Driver | BEV1 (United States) | BEV2 (United States) | BEV3 (United States) | BEV4 (United States) | BEV5 (United States) | BEV6 (United States) | SCA (United States) | FRE1 (United States) | COT1 (United States) | COT2 (United States) | INDY (United States) | UNI (United States) | TAC (United States) | COT3 (United States) | COT4 (United States) | KAN (United States) | FRE2 (United States) | BEV7 (United States) | Pts |
|---|---|---|---|---|---|---|---|---|---|---|---|---|---|---|---|---|---|---|---|---|
| 1 | (United States) Jimmy Murphy | 2 | 3 | 2 | 1 | | 2 | 2 | 1* | 1* | 3 | **1*** | **1*** | **1** | 3 | 9 | 14 | 8 | 1 | 3420 |
| 2 | (United States) Tommy Milton | 1* | 2* | 1 | | | 1* | DNS | | | | 24 | 10 | 2* | 2 | 2 | 1* | 2 | 5 | 1910 |
| 3 | (United States) Harry Hartz | 3 | 8 | 4 | 2 | 4 | 3 | 1* | 3 | 3 | 2 | 2 | 6 | 6 | 7 | 8 | 2 | 3 | 3 | 1788 |
| 4 | (United States) Frank Elliott | 4 | 4 | 3* | **4*** | 1* | **6** | 7 | 2 | 2 | 5 | 16 | 7 | DNP | 1* | 1* | 3 | 5 | 8 | 905 |
| 5 | (United States) Bennett Hill | DNP | | | | | | | | | | | | DNP | 4 | 5 | **6** | 1* | 4 | 459 |
| 6 | (United States) Eddie Hearne | 5 | 5 | 8 | 8 | 5 | | | 10 | | 10 | 3 | | 11 | 6 | 3 | 10 | 6 | 10 | 390 |
| 7 | (United States) Jerry Wunderlich | | 6 | 7 | 6 | 6 | | 6 | 6 | 10 | 8 | 6 | 3 | 4 | 8 | 4 | 5 | 4 | 15 | 372 |
| 8 | (United States) Roscoe Sarles | 11 | 7 | 5 | 3 | 2 | 5 | 3 | 9 | 4 | 4 | 23 | | 3 | | 10 | 11 | | | 280 |
| 9 | (United States) Earl Cooper | | | | | | | | | | | | | | | | | | 2 | 260 |
| 10 | (United States) Ralph Mulford | | | | | | | | | | | 19 | 2 | 9 | | | 4 | | | 255 |
| 11 | (United States) Art Klein | 10 | 10 | DNS | 5 | 3 | 7 | 4 | 4 | 5 | 6 | 21 | | 7 | 5 | 6 | | **7** | 6 | 227 |
| 12 | (United States) Ralph DePalma | 8 | | | | | | | DNS | 7 | 7 | 4 | | DNP | | | | | 11 | 150 |
| 13 | (United States) Joe Thomas | 6 | 9 | 6 | 7 | DNS | | 5 | 8 | 8 | 9 | 10 | | 8 | DNQ | | 9 | | 7 | 135 |
| 14 | (United States) Ora Haibe | | | | | | | | | | | 5 | 5 | | | | DNQ | | | 109 |
| 15 | (United States) I. P. Fetterman | | | | | | | | | | | 7 | 4 | | | | 7 | | | 108 |
| 16 | (United States) Howdy Wilcox | | | | | | | | | | | 27 | | 5 | | | 8 | | | 50 |
| 17 | (United States) Peter DePaolo RY | 12 | | | | | | 8 | 7 | 6 | DNS | 20 | | Wth | | | 12 | | | 50 |
| 18 | (United States) Tom Alley | | | | | | | | | | | 9 | | | | | | | | 35 |
| 19 | (United States) Eddie Miller | 7 | | | | | | DNS | | | | | | | | | | | | 25 |
| 20 | (United States) Ira Vail | | | | | | | | | | | 8 | | | | | | | | 21 |
| 21 | (United States) David Koetzla R | | | | | | | | | | | 8 | | | | | | | | 19 |
| 22 | (United States) Phil Shafer R | | | | | | | | | | | 7 | | | | | | | | 17 |
| 23 | (United States) Wade Morton | | | | | | | | | | | 10 | | | | | | | 17 | 15 |
| 24 | (United States) Al Melcher | DNP | | | | | | | | | | | | | 9 | 7 | DNP | 9 | **16** | 5 |
| - | (Kingdom of Italy) Pietro Bordino R | 9 | 1 | | | | 4 | | 5 | 9 | 1* | | | | | | | | | 0 |
| - | (United States) Jack Curtner R | | | | | | | | | | | 14 | 8 | | | | | | | 0 |
| - | (United States) Leon Duray R | | | | | | | | | | | 22 | 9 | DNP | | | 13 | | 14 | 0 |
| - | (United States) Cliff Durant | | | | | | | | | | | 12 | | 10 | | | DNS | | 13 | 0 |
| - | (United States) Erwin Baker R | | | | | | | | | | | 11 | | | | | | | | 0 |
| - | (United States) Ray Howard | | | | | | | | | | | | 11 | | | | | | | 0 |
| - | (United States) Dave Lewis | | | | | | | | | | | 12 | | | | | | | | 0 |
| - | (United States) Earl Devore | | | | | | | | | | | | | | | | | | 12 | 0 |
| - | (United States) Ralph Snoddy R | 13 | | | | | | | | | | | | | | | | | | 0 |
| - | (United Kingdom) Douglas Hawkes R | | | | | | | | | | | 13 | | | | | | | | 0 |
| - | (United States) Homer Ormsby R | | | | | | | | | | | 14 | | | | | | | | 0 |
| - | (United States) Wilbur D'Alene | | | | | | | | | | | 15 | | | | | | | | 0 |
| - | (United States) Riley Brett | | | | | | | | | | | | | | | | 15 | | | 0 |
| - | (United States) L. L. Corum R | | | | | | | | | | | 17 | | | | | | | | 0 |
| - | (United States) Glenn Howard R | | | | | | | | | | | 18 | | | | | | | | 0 |
| - | (France) Jules Goux | | | | | | | | | | | 25 | | | | | | | | 0 |
| - | (United States) Jules Ellingboe | | | | | | | | | | | 26 | | | | | | | | 0 |
| - | (United States) Leo Nordenschuld | | | | | | | DNQ | | | DNS | | | | | | | | | 0 |
| - | (United States) Jim Crosby | DNP | | | | | | DNQ | | | | | | | | | | | | 0 |
| - | (United States) Frank Davidson | | | | | | | | | | | DNQ | | | | | | | | 0 |
| - | (United States) William Gardner | | | | | | | | | | | DNQ | | | | | | | | 0 |
| - | (United Kingdom) Tom Mulligan | | | | | | | | | | | DNQ | | | | | | | | 0 |
| - | (United States) Rudolph Wehr | | | | | | | | | | | DNQ | | | | | | | | 0 |
| - | (United States) Allen Mulford | | | | | | | | | | | | | | | | DNQ | | | 0 |
| - | (United States) Louis Hansen | | | | | | | | | | | | | | | | | | DNQ | 0 |
| - | (United States) Herschell McKee | | | | | | | | | | | | | | | | | | DNQ | 0 |
| - | (United States) Wallace Reid | | | | | | | | | | | Wth | | | | | | | | 0 |
| - | (United States) Charles Shambaugh | | | | | | | | | | | Wth | | | | | | | | 0 |
| - | (United States) W. W. Brown | | | | | | | | | | | | | | | | DNS | | | 0 |
| Pos | Driver | BEV1 (United States) | BEV2 (United States) | BEV3 (United States) | BEV4 (United States) | BEV5 (United States) | BEV6 (United States) | SCA (United States) | FRE1 (United States) | COT1 (United States) | COT2 (United States) | INDY (United States) | UNI (United States) | TAC (United States) | COT3 (United States) | COT4 (United States) | KAN (United States) | FRE2 (United States) | BEV7 (United States) | Pts |

| Color | Result |
|---|---|
| Gold | Winner |
| Silver | 2nd place |
| Bronze | 3rd place |
| Green | 4th & 5th place |
| Light Blue | 6th-10th place |
| Dark Blue | Finished (Outside Top 10) |
| Purple | Did not finish (Ret) |
| Red | Did not qualify (DNQ) |
| Brown | Withdrawn (Wth) |
| Black | Disqualified (DSQ) |
| White | Did not start (DNS) |
| Blank | Did not participate (DNP) |
| Blank | Not competing |

**In-line notation**
| **Bold** | Pole position |
| Italics | Ran fastest race lap |
| * | Led most race laps |
Rookie of the Year
Rookie

== See also ==
- 1922 Indianapolis 500
