= Gwenda Hawkes =

British auto and motorcycle racing driver (1894–1990)

- Hawkes in 1934
- Born: Gwenda Mary Glubb; 1 June 1894; Fulwood, Preston, England
- Died: 27 May 1990 (aged 95); Marousi, Athens, Greece
- Occupations: Auto race driver; motorcycle race driver
- Spouses: Sam Janson (m. 1920; div. 1923); Robert Neil Stewart (m. 1924); Douglas Hawkes (m. 1937, died)
- Father: Frederic Manley Glubb
- Relatives: John Bagot Glubb (brother)
- Awards: Cross of St. Stanislaus

Gwenda Mary Hawkes (née Glubb, formerly Janson and Stewart; 1 June 1894 – 27 May 1990) was a British auto and motorcycle racing driver. During the First World War, Hawkes served in the Scottish Women's Hospitals for Foreign Service as a motor ambulance driver.

== Early life and education ==
Hawkes was born Gwenda Mary Glubb on 1 June 1894 in Fulwood, Preston to Frederic Manley Glubb, a captain and later major general in the Royal Engineers, and Frances Letitia Glubb (née Bagot; c. 1861 – c. 1862–1959), who was from Roscommon, Ireland. The eldest of two siblings, Glubb was the elder sister of the army officer and Arabist John Bagot Glubb.

In January 1913, Glubb began a library science course at St Hilda's Hall, a residential college attached to Cheltenham Ladies' College. In April 1915. following the outbreak of the First World War, Glubb left St Hilda's in order to contribute to the war effort.

== War record ==
Glubb initially worked for the War Office intelligence department, but later joined the Scottish Women's Hospitals for Foreign Service as a volunteer. Working a motor ambulance driver and as a result of her skill and endeavours on both the Russian Front and Rumanian Front from 1914 to 1918, she was awarded both the George Cross and the Cross of St. Stanislaus and was also mentioned in despatches.

== Motorcycle racing ==
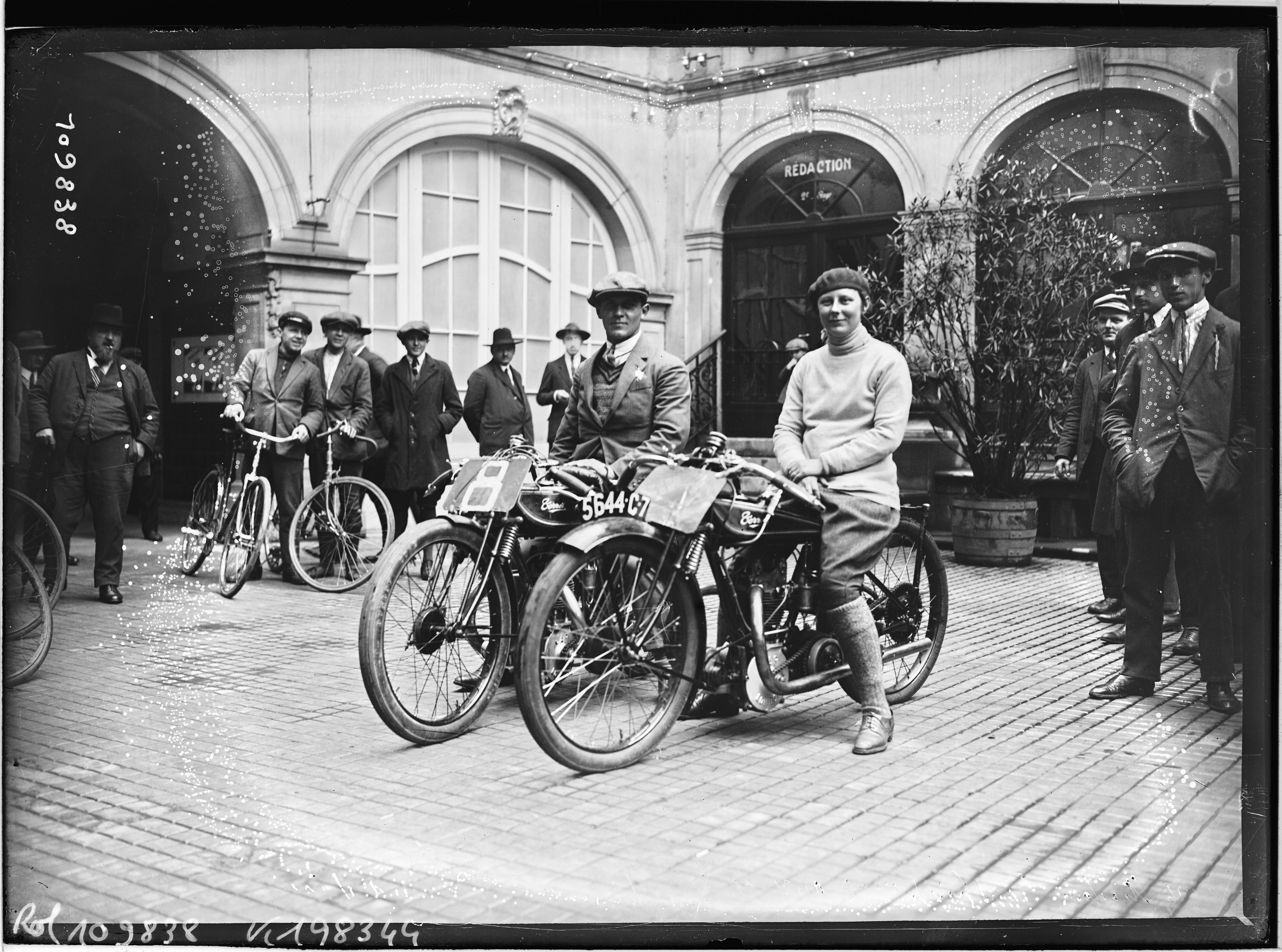
Gwenda on a Terrot with Gaston Durand (also on a Terrot) at a race in Strasbourg on 29 May 1926.

Following her marriage to Colonel Sam Janson, a director of the Spyker car company, on 17 February 1920 in Brompton, Gwenda became interested in motor-cycle racing, competing in events at Brooklands.

In the winter of 1921, Gwenda established the 1000-mile record on a Ner-A-Car motor-cycle and in 1922 took the Double-12-hour record at Brooklands on a Trump-JAP.

Gwenda spent time away from home whilst participating in motor-cycling events, and the close relationship that she developed with Colonel Neil Stewart, who was involved with the company who provided her motor-cycles, resulted in Janson divorcing her in 1923.

Gwenda and Stewart married, and, as a result of night-time restrictions on the use of the circuit at Brooklands interfering with Glenda's motor-cycle record breaking activities, the pair moved to France to be closer to the unrestricted circuit at Montlhéry. At the Montlhéry circuit, Gwenda broke the world 24-hour motor-cycle speed record on a Terrot-JAP.

At Montlhéry, Gwenda met Douglas Hawkes, who became one of her mechanics.

In 1930, Gwenda turned in a speed of 113 mph (182 km/h) in a race-tuned British 3-wheeler created by Morgan Super Sports.

== Motor-car racing ==
Douglas Hawkes was a director of the Derby engine and car company and was able to source a Miller Special from the United States. In the period between 1930 and 1933, in the Miller-derived car specially prepared by Derby and designated as a Derby-Miller, Gwenda broke the one-mile speed record several times at Montlhéry.

Gwenda also competed on two occasions, with little success, in the 24 Hours of Le Mans event, at the wheel of a Derby car using a Maserati engine. In 1935 she became the fastest woman ever at Brooklands, with a lap speed of 135.95 miles per hour which bettered the previous lap record set by Kay Petre.

Gwenda's affair with Douglas Hawkes resulted in her divorce from Stewart, and her marriage in 1937 to Hawkes as her third husband.

== Later life ==
In 1940, after the start of the World War II (WWII), Gwenda and Douglas Hawkes moved to England, where Mrs Hawkes took up work in an armaments factory to help the war effort.

After World War II, they moved to the small Greek island of Poros.

Douglas Hawkes died in 1974, and Gwenda died in May 27, 1990, aged 95.
