= Ora Haibe =

American racing driver (1887–1970)

- Born: Ora Frederic Haibe; September 27, 1887 Guilford, Indiana, U.S.
- Died: December 10, 1970 (aged 83) Fort Worth, Texas, U.S.

Champ Car career
- 18 races run over 8 years
- Best finish: 14th (1922)
- First race: 1915 Minneapolis 500 (Twin City)
- Last race: 1924 Indianapolis 500 (Indianapolis)
Wins	Podiums	Poles
0	0	0

Ora Frederic Haibe (September 27, 1887 – December 10, 1970) was an American racing driver.

Haibe made his first Indianapolis 500 start in 1916, driving a car constructed by auto dealer and driver Swan Ostewig. Ostewig relieved Haibe mid-way through the race after Haibe complained about handling, and finished in tenth place.

Haibe had a best finish of fifth at the Indianapolis 500, in 1921 and 1922, in a Sunbeam and a Duesenberg respectively. He finished a best of fourth in AAA Championship car races; at Phoenix in 1915, and Uniontown in 1917.

== Motorsports career results ==
=== Indianapolis 500 results ===
Year	Car	Start	Qual	Rank	Finish	Laps	Led	Retired
1916	9	13	87.080	15	10	120	0	Running
1919	17	26	92.800	25	14	200	0	Running
1921	16	13	93.500	10	5	200	0	Running
1922	31	14	92.900	18	5	200	0	Running
1924	31	17	92.810	18	15	182	0	Flagged
Totals						902	0	

Starts	5
Poles	0
Front Row	0
Wins	0
Top 5	2
Top 10	3
Retired	0
