= Jack Curtner =

American racing driver (1893–1959)

- Born: John Curtner; February 9, 1893 Van Buren, Ohio, U.S.
- Died: December 18, 1959 (aged 66) Greenville, Ohio, U.S.

Champ Car career
- 2 races run over 1 year
- First race: 1922 Indianapolis 500 (Indianapolis)
- Last race: 1922 Universal Trophy (Uniontown)
Wins	Podiums	Poles
0	0	0

John Curtner (February 9, 1893 – December 18, 1959) was an American racing driver.

== Motorsports career results ==
=== Indianapolis 500 results ===
Year	Car	Start	Qual	Rank	Finish	Laps	Led	Retired
1922	18	21	—	—	14	160	0	Flagged
Totals						160	0	

Starts	1
Poles	0
Front Row	0
Wins	0
Top 5	0
Top 10	0
Retired	0
