= Fred Harder =

American racing driver (1892–1956)

- Born: Fred John Harder; August 9, 1892 Detroit, Michigan, U.S.
- Died: March 17, 1956 (aged 63) Dayton, Ohio, U.S.

Champ Car career
- 1 race run over 1 year
- First race: 1924 Indianapolis 500 (Indianapolis)
Wins	Podiums	Poles
0	0	0

Fred John Harder (August 9, 1892 – March 17, 1956) was an American racing driver.

== Motorsports career results ==
=== Indianapolis 500 results ===
Year	Car	Start	Qual	Rank	Finish	Laps	Led	Retired
1924	27	22	82.770	22	17	177	0	Flagged
Totals						177	0	

Starts	1
Poles	0
Front Row	0
Wins	0
Top 5	0
Top 10	0
Retired	0
