= Frederic Manley Glubb =

Major-General Sir Frederic Manley Glubb KCMG CB DSO
- Glubb c.1915
- Born: 19 August 1857
- Died: 31 July 1938 (aged 80)

Major-General Sir Frederic Manley Glubb KCMG CB DSO (19 August 1857 – 31 July 1938) was a British Army officer, who was a senior figure in the Royal Engineers during the First World War. He was the father of the army officer Sir John Bagot Glubb ("Glubb Pasha") and of the racing driver Gwenda Hawkes.

Glubb was born in 1857, the son of Orlando Manley Glubb, an officer in the 37th Bengal Native Infantry. He attended Wellington College and then studied at the Royal Military Academy, Woolwich, from where he entered the Royal Engineers in 1877. He was promoted to captain in 1888, and married Frances Bagot, daughter of an Irish rural landowner, the following year . In 1895 he was promoted to major, and in November 1900 he was awarded the Distinguished Service Order (DSO) for his services in the Boer War in South Africa (1899-1900).

After the war, Glubb was promoted to lieutenant-colonel on 16 April 1903, and appointed Commanding Royal Engineer at Mauritius. He was promoted to colonel in April 1908, and in 1912 he became the Chief Engineer of Southern Command. In January 1914 he was made a CB in the 1914 New Year Honours.

On the outbreak of war, he was given a posting in the newly mobilised British Expeditionary Force, as the Commander Royal Engineers (CRE) of III Corps; this made him the senior engineering officer in the Corps, responsible for the defences and support of two infantry divisions. He served with the corps until February 1915, when he was promoted to major-general and made CRE of Second Army. He remained in this post for the remainder of the war, being mentioned in despatches eight times and awarded a knighthood.
