= Bill Hunt (racing driver) =

American racing driver (1890–1950)

- Born: Wilbert Lee Hunt; August 22, 1890 Connersville, Indiana, U.S.
- Died: December 15, 1950 (aged 60) Wickenburg, Arizona, U.S.

Champ Car career
- 1 race run over 1 year
- First race: 1924 Indianapolis 500 (Indianapolis)
Wins	Podiums	Poles
0	0	0

Wilbert Lee "Bill" Hunt (August 22, 1890 – December 15, 1950) was an American racing driver active during the 1920s. Better known for running the Craig-Hunt engine manufacturing company, that also made racing and road parts. Later became an aviator and rancher, but remained close to engineering all his life. Despite numerous reports listing him as William, his first name was Wilbert.

== Motorsports career results ==
=== AAA Championship car ===
Season	Class	Team	Race	Win	Podium	Pole	FLap	Pts	Plcd
1924	AAA National Championship	Barber-Warnock	1	0	0	0	0	0	NC

=== Indianapolis 500 results ===
Year	Car	Start	Qual	Rank	Finish	Laps	Led	Retired
1924	26	19	85.040	21	14	191	0	Flagged

Starts	1
Poles	0
Front Row	0
Wins	0
Top 5	0
Top 10	0
Retired	0
