= Douglas Hawkes =

British racing driver (1893–1974)

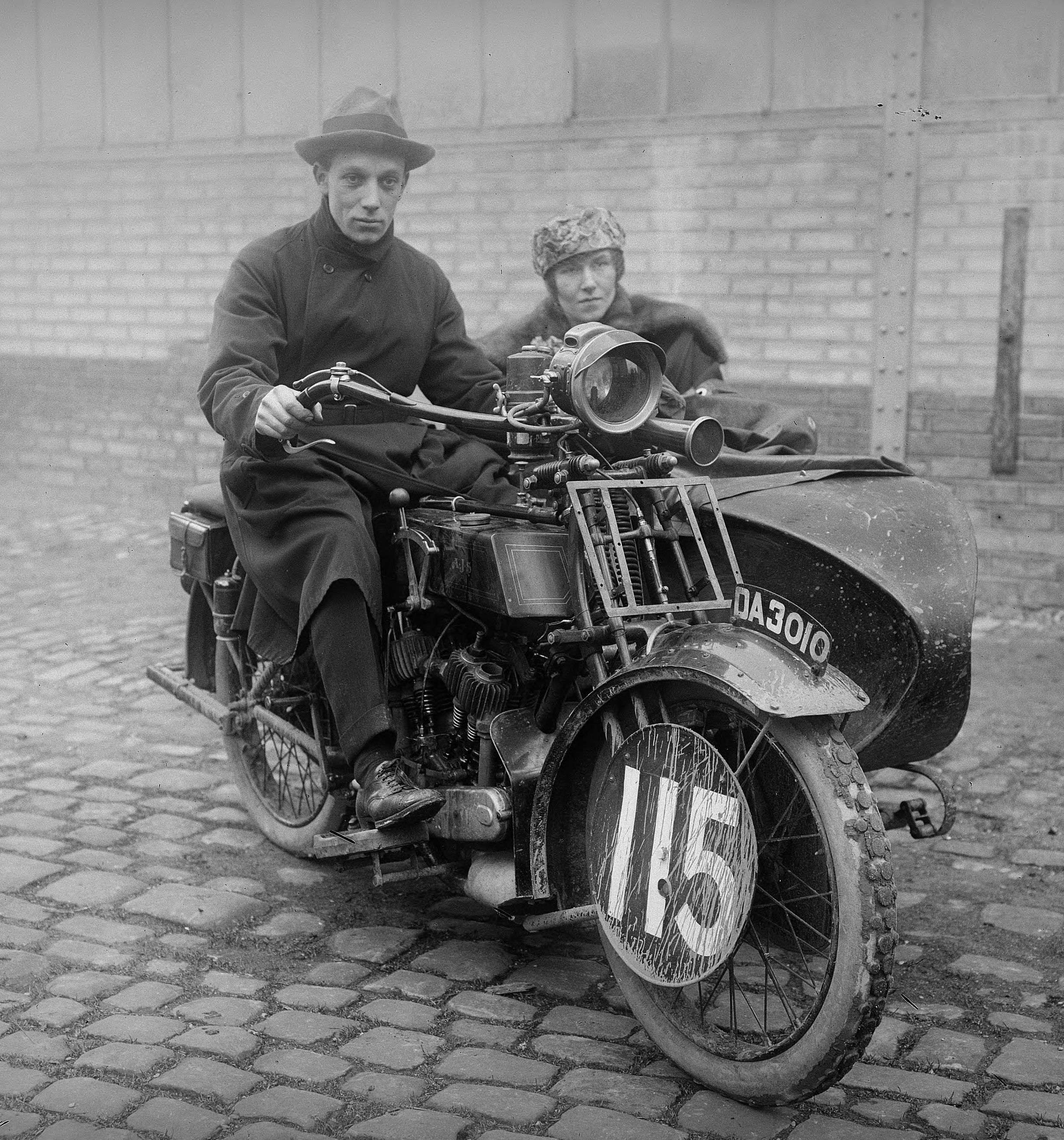
- Hawkes, circa 1920
- Born: Wallace Douglas Hawkes; 11 September 1893 Barton, Gloucestershire, England
- Died: 2 August 1974 (aged 80) Athens, Attica, Greece

Champ Car career
- 2 races run over 2 years
- First race: 1922 Indianapolis 500 (Indianapolis)
- Last race: 1926 Indianapolis 500 (Indianapolis)
Wins	Podiums	Poles
0	0	0

24 Hours of Le Mans career
- Years: 1928–1929
- Teams: Lagonda, S.A.R.A.
- Best finish: 11th (1928)
- Class wins: 0

Wallace Douglas Hawkes (11 September 1893 – 2 August 1974) was a British motor car designer, businessman and racing driver. He was born in Barton, Gloucestershire, married Gwenda Stewart in 1937, and died, aged 80, in Athens, Greece.

== Motorsports career results ==
=== Indianapolis 500 results ===
Year	Car	Start	Qual	Rank	Finish	Laps	Led	Retired
1922	22	19	81.900	26	13	200	0	Running
1926	27	17	94.977	21	14	91	0	Camshaft
Totals						291	0	

Starts	2
Poles	0
Front Row	0
Wins	0
Top 5	0
Top 10	0
Retired	1

=== 24 Hours of Le Mans results ===
Year	Team	Co-Driver	Car	Class	Laps	Pos.	Class Pos.
1928	(United Kingdom) Lagonda Motor Company	(France) Baron André d'Erlanger	Lagonda 2 Litre Speed Model	2.0	126	11th	2nd
1929	(France) Société des Applications à Refroidissements par Air	(France) Gaston Mottet	S.A.R.A. SP7	2.0	22	DNF	DNF
