= Alfred Moss =

British racing driver (1896–1972)

- Born: Alfred Ethelbert Moss; 30 May 1896 Stratford, Essex, England
- Died: 23 April 1972 (aged 75) Stoke Mandeville, Buckinghamshire, England

Champ Car career
- 1 race run over 1 year
- First race: 1924 Indianapolis 500 (Indianapolis)
Wins	Podiums	Poles
0	0	0

Alfred Ethelbert Moss (30 May 1896 – 23 April 1972) was a British dentist and racing driver. He was the father of British racing driver Stirling Moss.

== Biography ==
Born in Stratford, at the time part of the county of Essex, Moss was the son of Sarah Jane and Abraham Moses Moss. His father was Jewish, while his mother was a Christian.

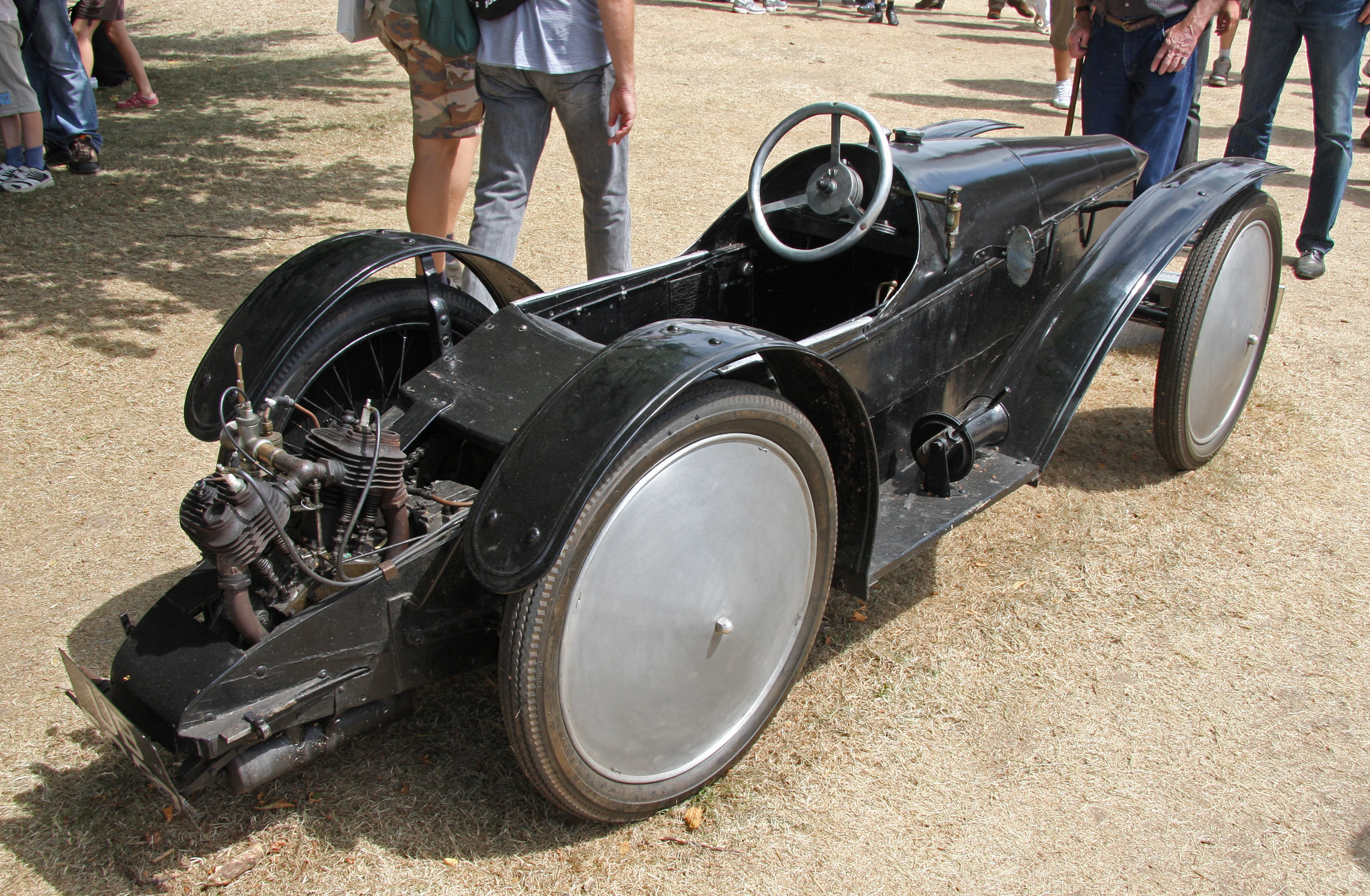
A 1919 AV

Moss became a successful London dentist, and from his mid-twenties he was also an enthusiastic competition driver, beginning his racing career at the Essex Motor Club's Winter Trial in 1921 driving a 1000 cc AV cyclecar. He was disqualified for seeking help after his rear tyres had burst twice. His AV later caught fire in Park Lane, and Moss then acquired a GN cyclecar, with which he enjoyed success in trials and hillclimbs, and which he raced at Brooklands. In 1922, he bought and began to race a Crouch Le Mans sports car which had no front brakes. In the 1924 Indianapolis 500, he placed 14th or 16th (sources differ) in a Fronty Ford.

Moss met his future wife, Aileen Craufurd, at Brooklands. She had been an ambulance driver in the First World War, and also did some racing. They were married at St Marylebone in 1928 and were the parents of the Formula One driver Stirling Moss and the rallying champion Pat Moss.

In 1957, Moss and his son's manager Ken Gregory established the Formula One team British Racing Partnership with the objective to run cars for Stirling, when not under contract with other firms, along with other up-and-coming drivers.

Moss died aged 75 in Stoke Mandeville, Aylesbury, Buckinghamshire, on the 10th anniversary of his son being seriously injured in a car racing crash at Goodwood.

== Motorsports career results ==
=== Indianapolis 500 results ===
Year	Car	Start	Qual	Rank	Finish	Laps	Led	Retired
1924	28	20	85.270	20	16	177	0	Flagged
Totals						177	0	

Starts	1
Poles	0
Front Row	0
Wins	0
Top 5	0
Top 10	0
Retired	0
