= Lora L. Corum =

American racing driver (1899–1949)

- Corum, circa 1924
- Born: Lora Lawrence Corum; January 8, 1899 Jonesville, Indiana, U.S.
- Died: March 7, 1949 (aged 50) Indianapolis, Indiana, U.S.

Championship titles
- Major victories Indianapolis 500 (1924 (co-winner))

Champ Car career
- 11 races run over 13 years
- Best finish: 7th (1924)
- First race: 1922 Indianapolis 500 (Indianapolis)
- Last race: 1933 Indianapolis 500 (Indianapolis)
- First win: 1924 Indianapolis 500 (Indianapolis)
Wins	Podiums	Poles
1	1	0

Lora Lawrence Corum (January 8, 1899 – March 7, 1949) was a co-winner of the 1924 Indianapolis 500.

== Biography ==
Corum was born on January 8, 1899, in Jonesville, Indiana to Margaret Hannah Marquette and William Cecil Corum.

During the 1924 Indianapolis 500 Corum, in third place, was replaced by the more well-known Joe Boyer on lap 109 on orders of the head of the team after Boyer's car developed trouble. While Corum received the prize money and was credited with the victory (later this was changed to the two drivers being co-winners), Boyer received most of the credit from the racing community. Corum qualified for the 1928 Indianapolis 500, but suffered a crash during a practice run on the morning of the race.

Corum left racing in 1933, but returned in 1938 as a mechanic, working for Harry Miller's five car team at the Indianapolis 500.

Corum died on March 7, 1949, at age 50.

== Motorsports career results ==
=== Indianapolis 500 results ===
Year	Car	Start	Qual	Rank	Finish	Laps	Led	Retired
1922	27	15	89.650	19	17	169	0	Engine trouble
1923	23	7	86.650	23	5	200	0	Running
1924	15	21	93.330	16	1	109	0	Relieved
1926	23	24	88.849	26	20	44	0	Shock absorbers
1930	27	17	94.130	29	10	200	0	Running
1933	47	18	110.465	29	12	200	0	Running
Totals						902	0	

Starts	6
Poles	0
Front Row	0
Wins	1
Top 5	2
Top 10	3
Retired	2

Preceded by Tommy Milton	Indianapolis 500 Winner; 1924	Succeeded by Peter DePaolo
