= Bannister Federal Complex =

Federal office complex

- Kansas City, Missouri, US
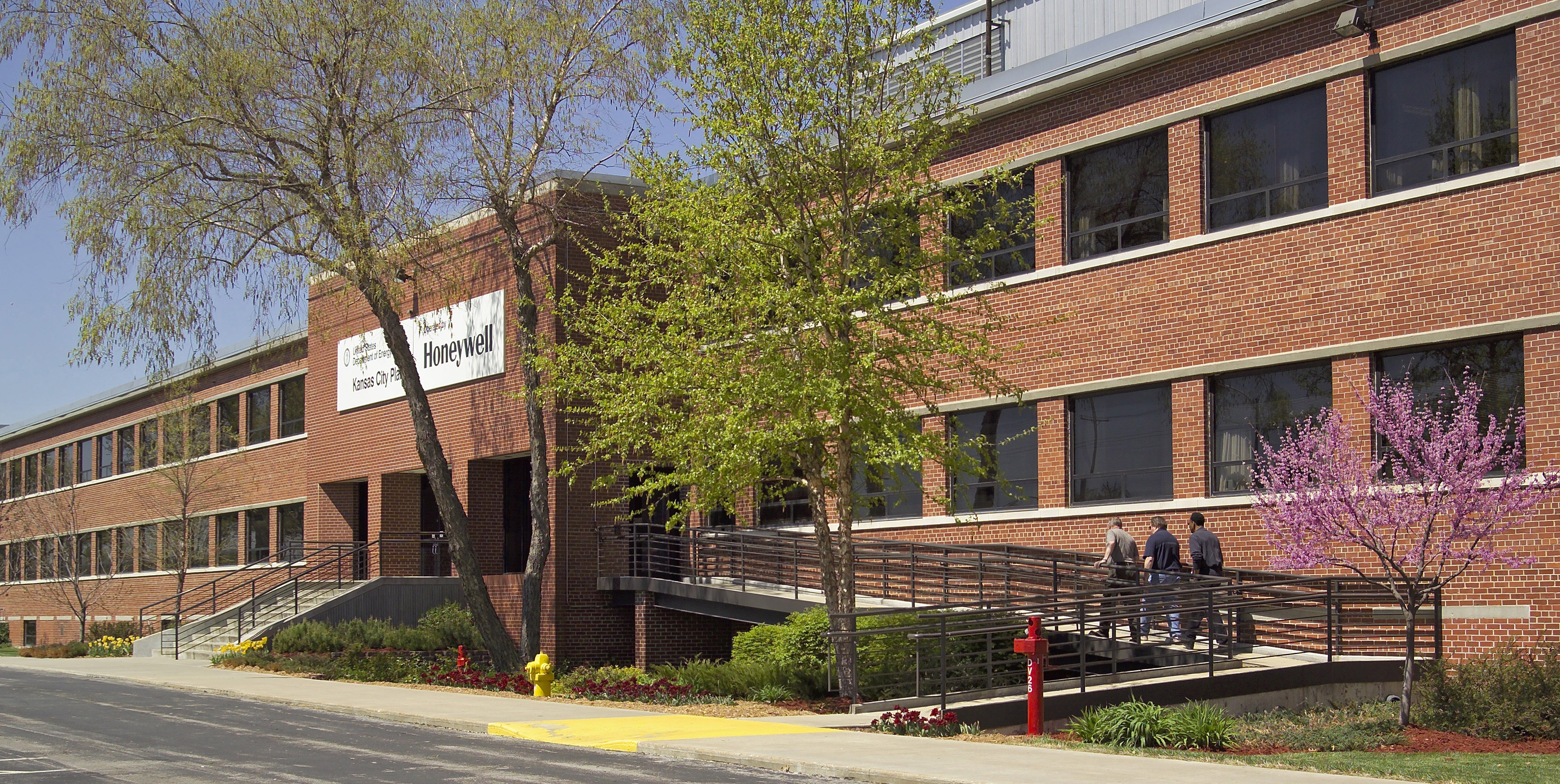
- Kansas City Plant

Site information
- Controlled by: Department of Energy (NNSA); General Services Administration

Location
- Coordinates: 38.958°N 94.569°W

Site history
- Built: 1942
- In use: 1942 – 2017

Garrison information
- Occupants: NNSA, operated by Honeywell; GSA Regional Headquarters; United States Marine Corps; Department of Veterans Affairs; Department of Commerce; Department of Agriculture (USDA)

The Bannister Federal Complex was a United States federal government complex at 1500 E. Bannister Road in Kansas City, Missouri. The 310-acre (125.5 ha) complex consisted of 10 buildings at the corner of Troost Avenue and Bannister Road. The complex was occupied primarily by the General Services Administration and the Department of Energy. Ownership of the property was transferred to Bannister Transformation and Development LLC in November 2017.

The largest component was the Kansas City Plant, which was moved in 2014 and renamed the "Kansas City National Security Campus". It produced and assembled non-nuclear components of the United States nuclear weapon arsenal. The Bannister Federal Complex was added to the National Register of Historic Places in 2013.

== Site history ==
=== Kansas City Speedway ===
The site was originally home to the Kansas City Speedway, not to be confused with the modern Kansas Speedway. Jack Prince and Art Pillsbury (who also built several such tracks including the Beverly Hills Speedway) built the track in 1922 at a cost of $500,000. The 1.25 mile wood oval track had high banked turns, two grandstands, and parking for 20,000 automobiles, including 5,000 in the infield. The racetrack itself was located near what is now 95th and Troost, and the main entrance was located at 94th and Holmes Rd.

The first race was scheduled for September 16, 1922, but rain delayed the race until the following day. More than 50,000 people attended the first of only four auto races that would ever be held at the Kansas City Speedway, which also hosted motorcycle racing. Notable attendees at the first race included the Mayor of Kansas City, Missouri Governor Arthur M. Hyde, and great race car drivers, including Ray Harroun, and Barney Oldfield. Seventeen drivers participated in the first race, including Tommy Milton, Leon Duray, and Cliff Durant. The race was won by Tommy Milton, who was also the first driver to win the Indianapolis 500 twice. The first race also saw the only fatality at the track when the race claimed the life of 27-year-old Roscoe Sarles who collided with Peter DePaolo on the 110th lap. The average speed for the first race was 107 mph, which was significantly faster than Indianapolis 500 races of that time. In fact, the average speed at Indianapolis did not exceed 100 mph until 1925.

In 1924, the last race, a 250-mile event, was stopped after about 150 miles because large holes had appeared in the wood track. The nearby Blue River caused the untreated lumber used in constructing the track to warp. Jimmy Murphy won the fourth and final auto race on July 4, 1924. The speedway was sold on March 24, 1925, for only $97,500.

=== World War II ===
On July 4, 1942, following the World War II attack on Pearl Harbor, then-Senator (later President) Harry S. Truman broke ground on the site for construction of a large facility that became home to Pratt and Whitney. The famous Double Wasp airplane engines were manufactured for the Navy at the facility through the duration of the war effort. Following the victory in Japan, the facility was closed and remained vacant until 1947.

A Department of Defense landfill was established in 1942 on a portion of the area, as a disposal site for the Bannister Federal Complex. From 1942 to 1964, when the landfill was closed, several government contractors, including Pratt and Whitney and Westinghouse, disposed of waste in the landfill. Disposal activities at the landfill resulted in contamination to soil and groundwater by solvents, metals and petroleum contaminants.

=== Post-war ===
In 1947, the Internal Revenue Service moved facilities onto the site, and in 1949 the largest portion of the plant was leased to a division of Westinghouse Electric Corporation. The plant again began producing aircraft engines, this time jet engines for the McDonnell F2H Banshee naval fighter jet, and others to be used in the Korean War. At that time, the Fairfax Storage Company also began using part of the complex as a warehouse for tires, raw rubber, sugar, and lumber. Westinghouse also subleased part of the plant to Bendix beginning in 1949, which later became Allied Signal. Bendix began operating the facility for the Atomic Energy Commission and building nonnuclear components for nuclear weapons. This portion of the complex became known as the Kansas City Plant. The Kansas City Plant occupied the greatest portion of the complex, and in 1958 Westinghouse moved out and Bendix expanded operations at the Kansas City Plant.

The Kansas City Plant portion of the Bannister Federal Complex, which was operated and managed by Honeywell Federal Manufacturing & Technologies, LLC for the National Nuclear Security Administration (NNSA), provided high-tech production services to government agencies. As one of the most secure production facilities in the country, the plant produced nonnuclear mechanical, electronic and engineered material components for U.S. national defense systems, such as high-energy laser ignition systems, microwave hybrid microcircuit production, and miniature electromechanical devices. The plant also provided technical services such as metallurgical/mechanical analysis, analytical chemistry, environmental testing, nondestructive testing, computer-based training, simulations and analysis, and technical certification. The nonnuclear components produced at the Kansas City Plant comprise 85 percent of the parts manufactured within the nuclear weapons complex, as well as 85 percent of the components that constitute a nuclear weapon. The Kansas City Plant was the NNSA's highest rated production facility As of fiscal year 2007, the Kansas City Plant had 2,711 employees. Gross operating cost for KCP in FY07 was $501 million.

The Internal Revenue Service once occupied 474,000 square feet (44,000 m^{2}) in two buildings of the complex, but the IRS moved into a new facility near Union Station in October 2006, taking about 2,500 jobs out of the Bannister complex. The National Archives and Records Administration, which occupied 153,000 square feet (14,200 m^{2}) of space at the complex, began operating in a new location, also near Union Station on Memorial Day 2009. The Defense Finance and Accounting Service was also removed from the complex, leaving about 300,000 square feet (30,000 m^{2}) vacant.

GSA relocated its regional office operations to 2300 Main Street, near Union Station, in 2015.

=== Health issues ===
Many employees at the Bannister Federal Complex developed health problems seemingly traced to environmental contamination there. Maurice Copeland, who had been a manager there, said that, "often times safety measures were not taken, nor personal protective gear provided." Walter Smith, an interviewer for the Building Trades National Medical Screening Program, said, "Certain particles or particulars you can only get at the DOE site. It's hard to get them anywhere else." The "Energy Employees Occupational Illness Compensation Program" (EEOICP) was enacted by the US Congress and signed by then-President Clinton in 2000 in recognition of this problem. By 12 January 2023, EEOICP had provided almost $23 billion in compensation and payment of medical bills to almost 140,000 workers and their families. Senator Josh Hawley (R-MO) supported expanding the coverage of the Radiation Exposure Compensation Act and extending it beyond its July 2024 expiration date, but that measure was deleted from the budget approved in 2023.

== See also ==
- Hardesty Federal Complex - Another abandoned federal complex with environmental mass contamination in Kansas City
