= Roscoe Sarles =

American racing driver (1892–1922)

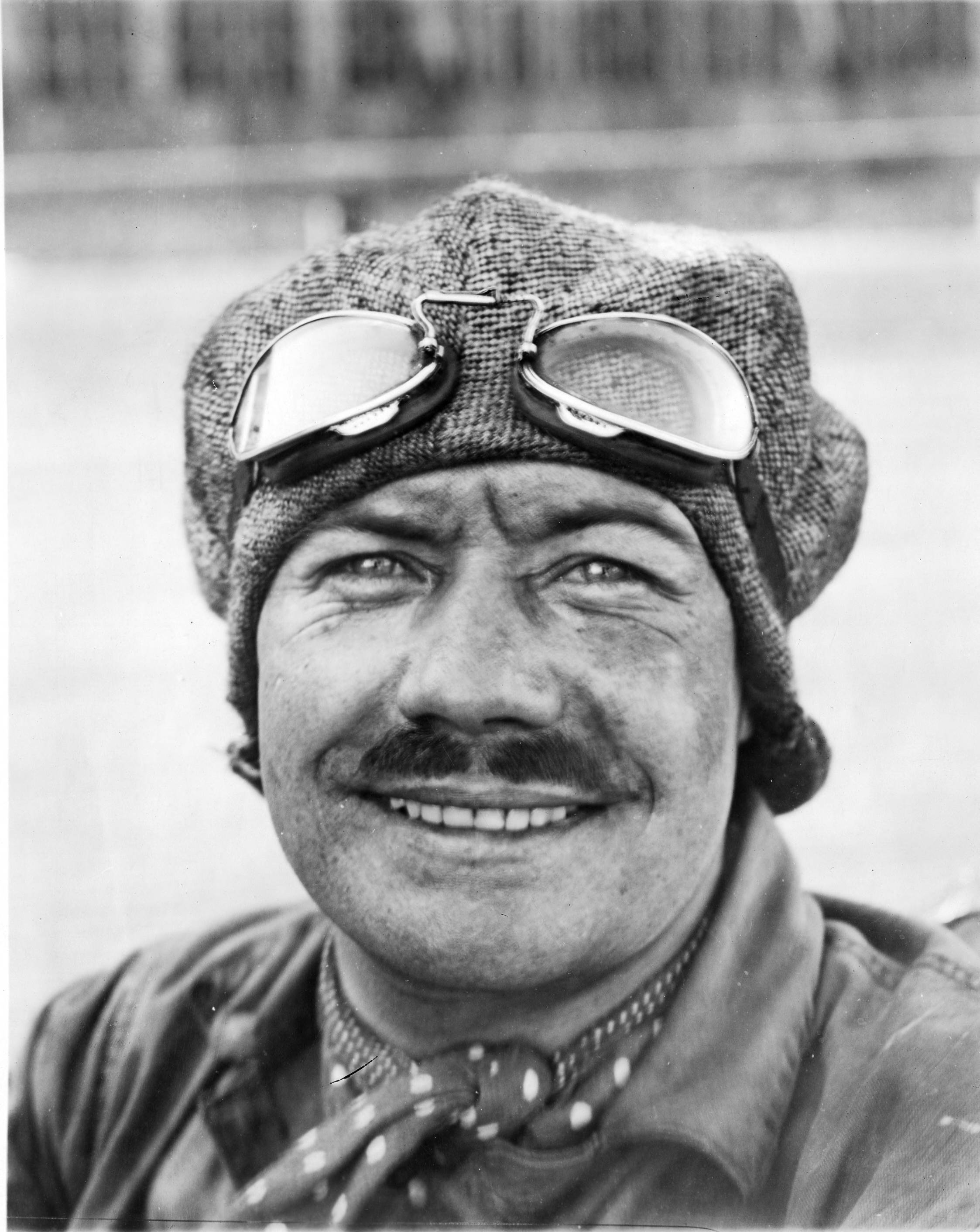
- Sarles at Tacoma Speedway in 1920
- Born: Roscoe Conkling Sarles; January 4, 1892 New Albany, Indiana, U.S.
- Died: September 17, 1922 (aged 30) Kansas City, Missouri, U.S.

Champ Car career
- 47 races run over 5 years
- Best finish: 2nd (1921)
- First race: 1917 Minneapolis 100 (Twin City)
- Last race: 1922 Kansas City 300 (Kansas City)
- First win: 1919 All-Star Sweepstakes (Ascot Speedway)
- Last win: 1921 Cotati 150 #2 (Cotati)
Wins	Podiums	Poles
6	25	2

Roscoe Conkling Sarles (January 4, 1892 – September 17, 1922) was an American racing driver active in the formative years of auto racing.

== Biography ==
Sarles was born on January 4, 1892, in New Albany, Indiana.

Sarles died on September 17, 1922, when his car crashed at the Kansas City Speedway.

== Motorsports career results ==
=== Indianapolis 500 results ===
Year	Car	Start	Qual	Rank	Finish	Laps	Led	Retired
1919	28	19	97.700	12	33	8	0	Rocker arm
1920	5	7	90.750	9	20	58	0	Crash T4
1921	6	2	98.350	2	2	200	1	Running
1922	2	6	98.000	6	23	88	0	Rod
Totals						354	1	

Starts	4
Poles	0
Front Row	1
Wins	0
Top 5	1
Top 10	1
Retired	3

Finishing Positions in AAA Championships: 1920 5th, 1921 2nd, 1922 6th
