= Pietro Bordino =

Italian racing driver (1887–1928)

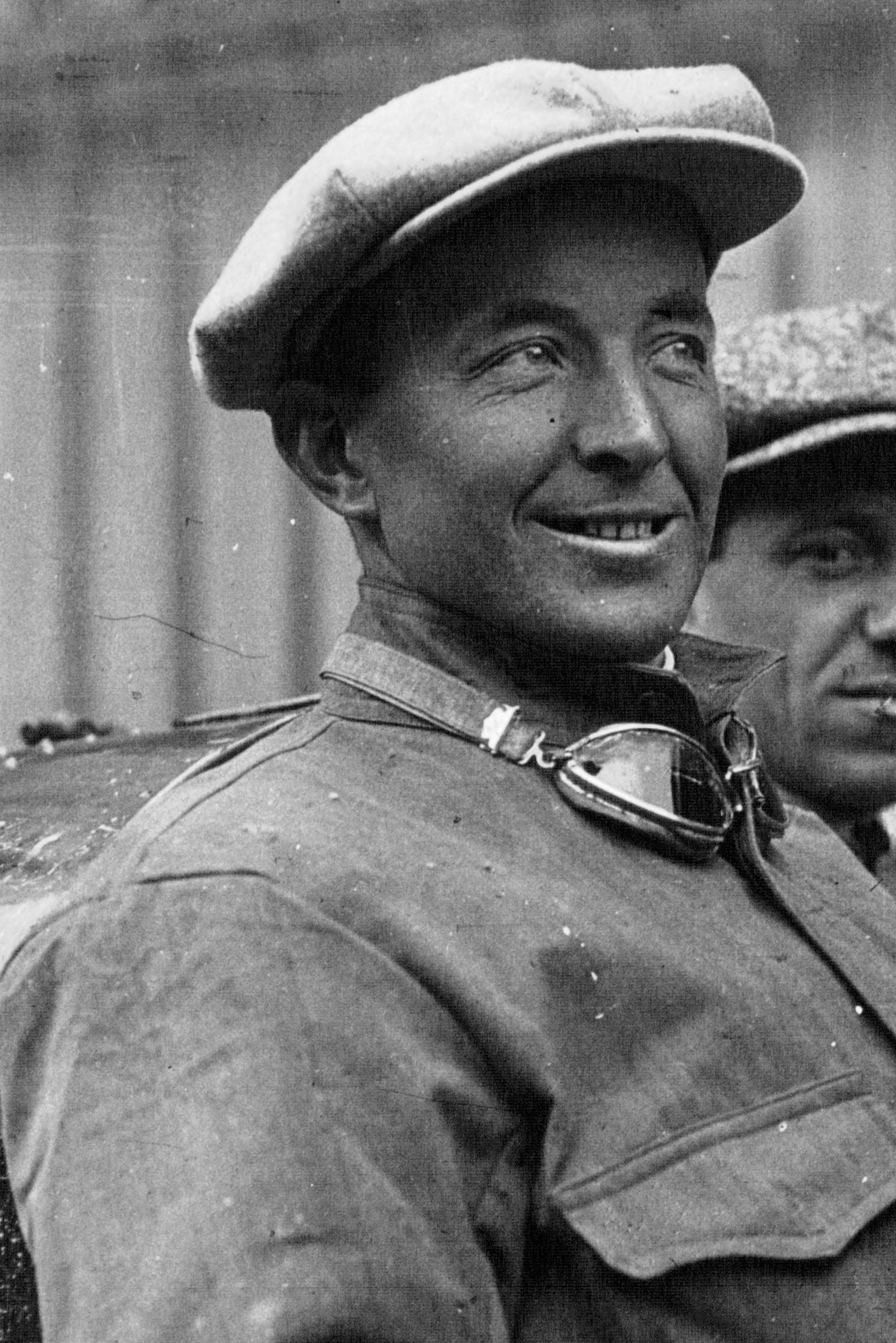
- Bordino in 1922
- Born: 22 November 1887 Turin, Piedmont, Italy
- Died: 15 April 1928 (aged 40) Alessandria, Piedmont, Italy

Champ Car career
- 10 races run over 3 years
- Best finish: 17th (tie) (1925)
- First race: 1922 Beverly Hills 250 #1 (Beverly Hills)
- Last race: 1925 Indianapolis 500 (Indianapolis)
- First win: 1922 25-mile Heat #1 (Beverly Hills)
- Last win: 1922 50-mile Race (Cotati)
Wins	Podiums	Poles
2	2	0

Pietro Bordino (22 November 1887 – 15 April 1928) was an Italian racing driver. One of Italy's top racing drivers of the 1920s, Bordino won the 1922 Italian Grand Prix. One of the few European drivers of the period to compete on the regular American Indy car circuit, composed largely of board ovals, he won twice during the 1922 U.S. racing season.

Bordino died in 1928 during practice for a race at Alessandria after he hit a dog, causing his car to overturn and land in a river, drowning him. Sir Henry Segrave described him as “the finest road race driver in the world.” He was renowned for his speed and courage, although his race successes did not necessarily meet that promise.

== Racing career ==
Bordino was born on 22 November 1887 in Turin, His father got work as a caretaker at the new FIAT factory. In 1904, as a 17-year old, he started his racing career as a riding mechanic with Vincenzo Lancia and Felice Nazzaro. He accompanied Lancia in the 1905 Gordon Bennett Cup, finishing second, and they were second to Nazzaro in the 1907 Targa Florio. In 1908, he again accompanied Lancia in the FIAT works team at the French Grand Prix at Dieppe, where they retired, and the Coppa Florio, where they came fifth and Nazzaro won. In the same year he got to drive a FIAT for himself, winning the French hill-climb at Château-Thierry. Again in 1910, he won his class in the Modena speed-trial for FIAT, which was also the final race for Vincenzo Lancia. He continued with speed record attempts the next year, driving a FIAT using a 300 bhp engine of an airship at Brooklands and the Saltburn sands. The 1913 Targa Florio was a 2-day lap of Sicily and for the first time he broke away from FIAT to drive one of his former team-mate's own cars. After nearly 14 hours driving, he brought his Lancia home in third.

Bordino returned to Sicily after the Great War for the 12th Targa Florio in 1921. Driving a 3-litre Fiat 801 he retired on the second lap. Later in the year, he drove for Fiat in the first Italian Grand Prix, held near Brescia. Taking the lead from the start, he set the early pace, including the fastest lap of the race of over 150 mph, until forced to retired with a broken oil-pump. Ineligible for the new 2-litre formula coming in the next year, Bordino and his Fiat 801 traveled across the Atlantic to race in America. Out of six starts at the beginning of the 1922 AAA Championship Car season, he won two short, sprint races on wooden-board ovals at the Beverly Hills and Cotati Speedways in California.

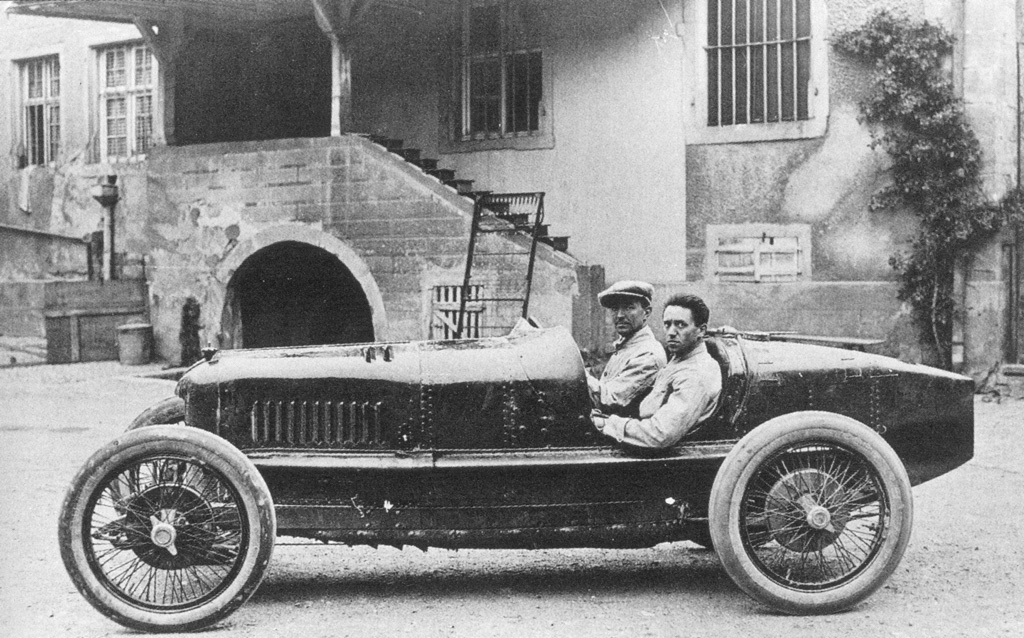
Bordino at the 1922 French Grand Prix

In 1922, the new Italian racing circuit was opened at the Autodromo Nazionale di Monza. Bordino and Nazzaro completed the first test laps on July 28 in a Fiat 501, with construction completed in a remarkable 100 days. In September, Bordino won the inaugural race, for sports cars, in a Fiat. He won the Italian Voiturette Grand Prix in a Fiat 502 – a new 1.5-litre design using half the engine of the 801. For the second Italian Grand Prix, at Monza a few days later, despite heavy rain 100000 spectators turned out (arriving in almost 25% of Italy’s complete automobile fleet of 41000 cars at the time). Fiat had introduced their new 804 model for the 2-litre formula, and were the strong favourites on their home track. They had dominated the recent, blue riband French Grand Prix, won by Nazzaro. In that race the suspension of Bordino's Fiat had collapsed while he was leading, fortunately without significant injury. But an almost identical accident earlier in the race had killed Nazzaro's nephew.

The race was diminished, as most of the other works teams had cancelled their attendance. From a promising 38 entries, only six started, including Bordino, Nazzaro and Enrico Giaccone for Fiat. Once again, Bordino took the lead from the start. By the 50th of 80 laps there were only three cars left running, and Bordino could ease off to take a comfortable victory from Nazzaro. Overnight, Bordino became a national celebrity, and his hard-driving style in the red Fiats earned him the nickname of Diavolo Rosso (Red devil).

In the 1923 Grand Prix, Fiat had its ground-breaking, supercharged Tipo 805. Earlier in practice, Bordino and teammate Giaccone had been out testing together when the suspension on their Fiat broke, throwing them off the track. Giaccone died of his wounds later in hospital, while Bordino injured his neck and dislocated his shoulder (or broke his wrist). He drove the race with his arm in a sling, and his riding mechanic helping to change gears. He set the fastest lap before retiring from the excessive pain. Fellow Fiat team-member, Carlo Salomano, took victory, the first Grand Prix win for a supercharged car.

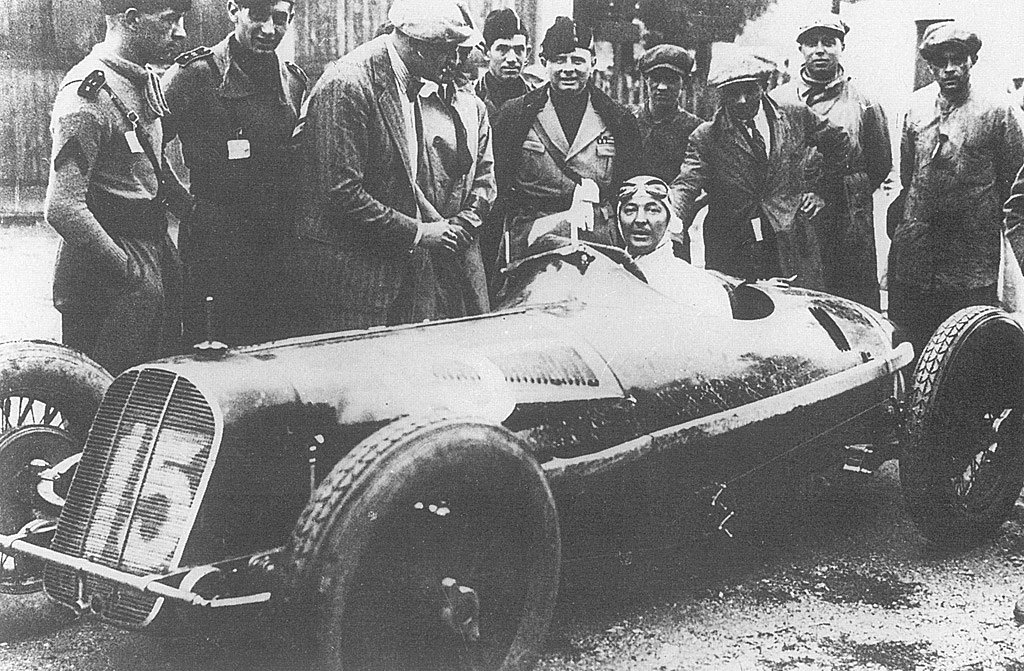
Pietro Bordino and the Fiat 806 at the 1927 Milan GP

The 1924 Targa Florio was to be a race between the Alfa Romeo and Mercedes works teams. Fiat entered Bordino in a smaller, 1.5-litre supercharged 501SS model. Despite giving away a power advantage, his consistency gave him third place and winning his class. The Fiats were outmatched at the French Grand Prix by the new Alfa Romeos. Though Bordino duelled for the lead with Antonio Ascari's Alfa Romeo initially, his brakes soon faded. Victory went to Giuseppe Campari's Alfa. In 1925, Bordino took a Fiat 805 across to America to run in the Indianapolis 500. Adapted into a single-seater, he ran several races in the lead-up without great success. In the main race itself he qualified eighth on the grid. He had to stop early in the race to change spark-plugs that cost him two laps. He then injured his hand during a pit-stop. His relief driver, Frenchman Antoine Mourne, took over and brought the Fiat home to finish tenth.

Fiat had retired its works team for several years, but in 1927 surprised the racing world with the powerful new Tipo 806, and its V12 supercharged 1.5-litre engine. Too new to endure the four-hour Italian Grand Prix, the team gave the prototype to Bordino to race in the Milan Grand Prix supporting race at the same meeting. Despite heavy rain, he dominated the race and easily won the car's first and only race.

When Fiat chose to stop its racing program for good, Bordino bought a new Bugatti Type 35B to race in the 1928 Italian Driver's Championship. The third round at the end of March, the Circuito del Pozzo, was one of the fastest tracks, but the heavy rain made driving conditions very difficult. Bordino led at the start, but after getting a puncture and falling two laps behind, he retired. The next weekend, he competed in the second Mille Miglia in a Bugatti Type 43 tourer. The 1000-mile race went from Brescia to Rome and back. The race was won by the veteran Campari in an Alfa Romeo, while Bordino finished two hours behind in sixteenth, after over 21 hours racing.

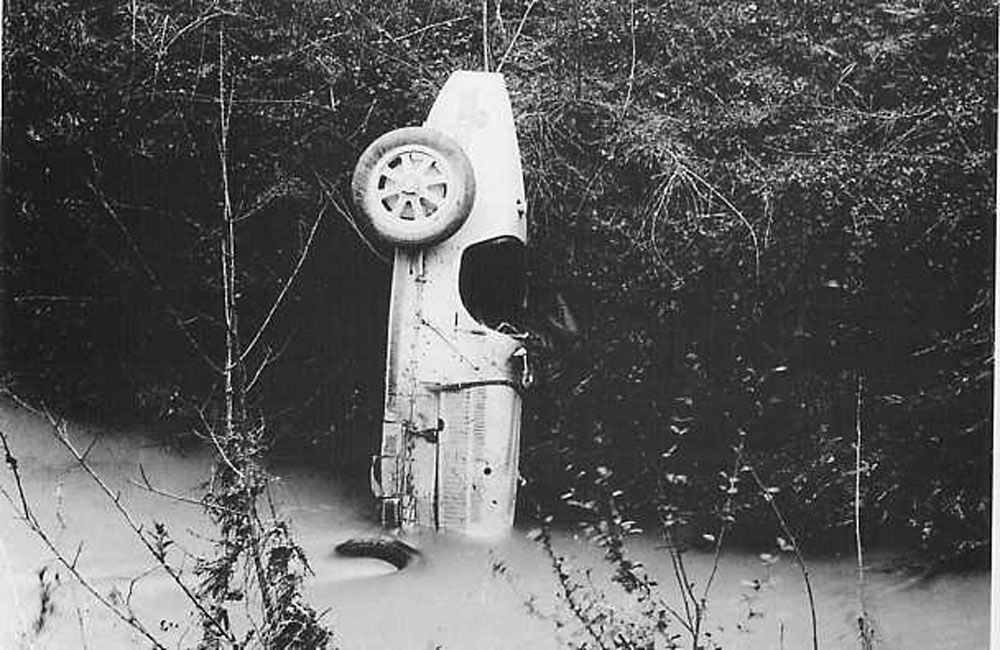
The fatal crash of Pietro Bordino in Alessandria

A fortnight later was the Circuito di Alessandria, next race in the Italian Championship. Bordino took the opportunity in the intervening weekend for some race testing. He had been offered a works drive by Bugatti for that race and the following Targa Florio. He was just completing a lap, coming back into the city when a dog ran into the street in front of the car. Hitting the animal at 70 km/h, the suspension and steering were wrecked. Despite his best efforts, Bordino lost control as the car spun off the road, got airborne and tumbled down the roadside cliff to the Tanaro River. Bordino was thrown from the car and found dead a few hundred metres downstream. His mechanic, Giovanni (or Pietro) Lasagna, was crushed by the car and critically injured but eventually recovered. In commemoration, the race would be thereafter renamed the Circuito Pietro Bordino.

Bordino was buried in the Cimitero Monumentale di Torino.

== Motorsports career results ==
=== Indianapolis 500 results ===
Year	Car	Start	Qual	Rank	Finish	Laps	Led	Retired
1925	22	8	107.661	9	10	200	0	Running
Totals						200	0	

Starts	1
Poles	0
Front Row	0
Wins	0
Top 5	0
Top 10	1
Retired	0
