= Frank Elliott (racing driver) =

American racing driver (1890–1959)

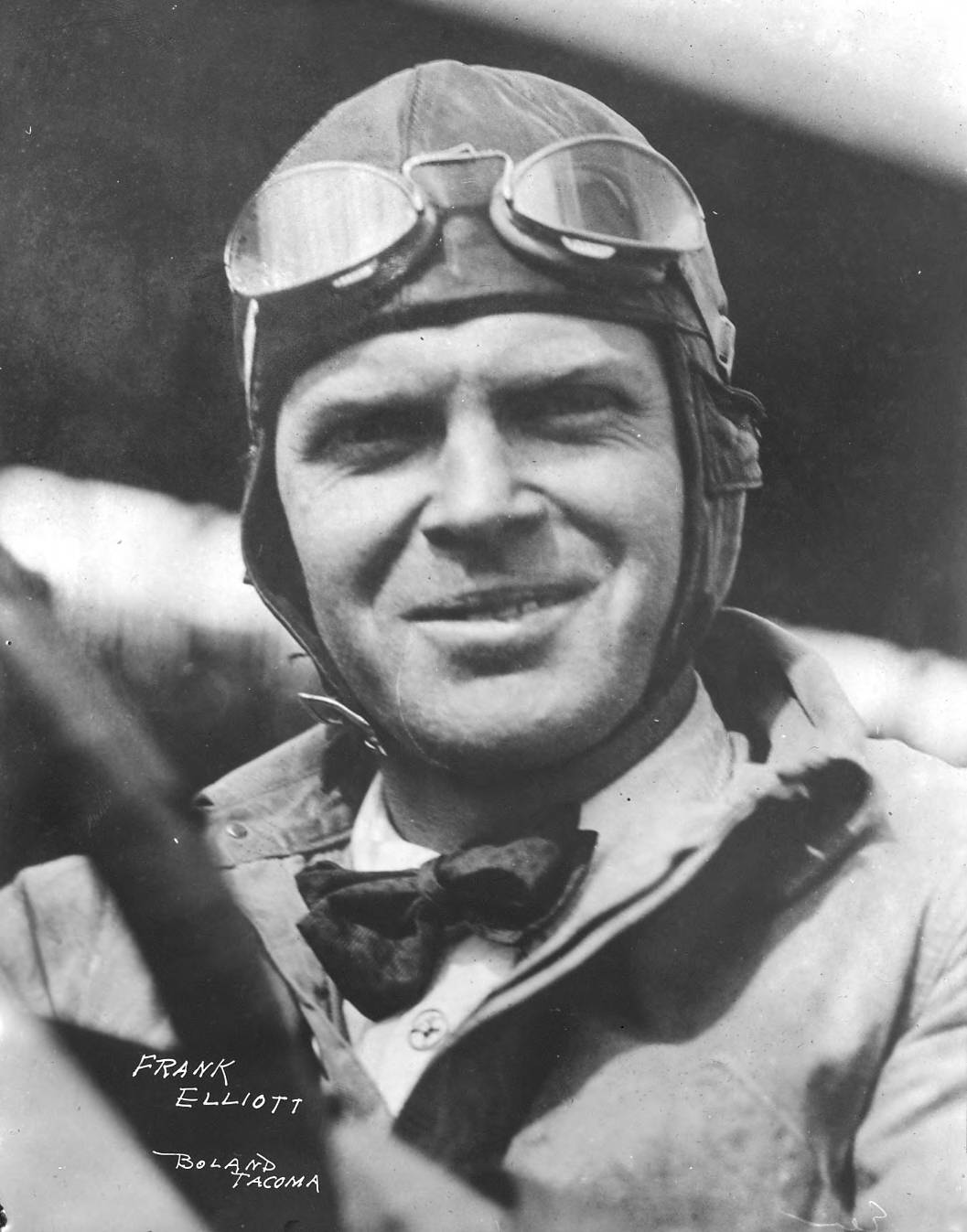
- Elliott at Tacoma Speedway in 1921
- Born: Frank Rollin Elliott; September 6, 1890 Mirabile, Missouri, U.S.
- Died: March 15, 1959 (aged 68) Seattle, Washington, U.S.

Champ Car career
- 85 races run over 11 years
- Best finish: 4th (1922)
- First race: 1915 Tropico Road Race (Tropico)
- Last race: 1927 75-mile Race (Rockingham Park)
- First win: 1917 Autumn Classic (Uniontown)
- Last win: 1925 Culver City 250 #2 (Culver City)
Wins	Podiums	Poles
5	16	3

Frank Rollin Elliott (September 6, 1890 – March 13, 1959) was an American racing driver. In addition to six appearances in the Indianapolis 500, Elliott also competed on board tracks, such as the Beverly Hills Speedway.

== Motorsports career results ==
=== Indianapolis 500 results ===
Year	Car	Start	Qual	Rank	Finish	Laps	Led	Retired
1922	9	8	97.750	8	16	195	0	Rear axle
1923	31	16	93.250	12	6	200	0	Running
1924	21	12	99.310	12	20	149	0	Gas tank
1925	27	10	104.910	11	12	200	0	Running
1926	6	8	105.873	8	6	152	0	Flagged
1927	5	13	109.682	17	10	200	0	Running
Totals						1096	0	

Starts	6
Poles	0
Front Row	0
Wins	0
Top 5	0
Top 10	3
Retired	2
