= 1924 Indianapolis 500 =

American motor race

12th Indianapolis 500
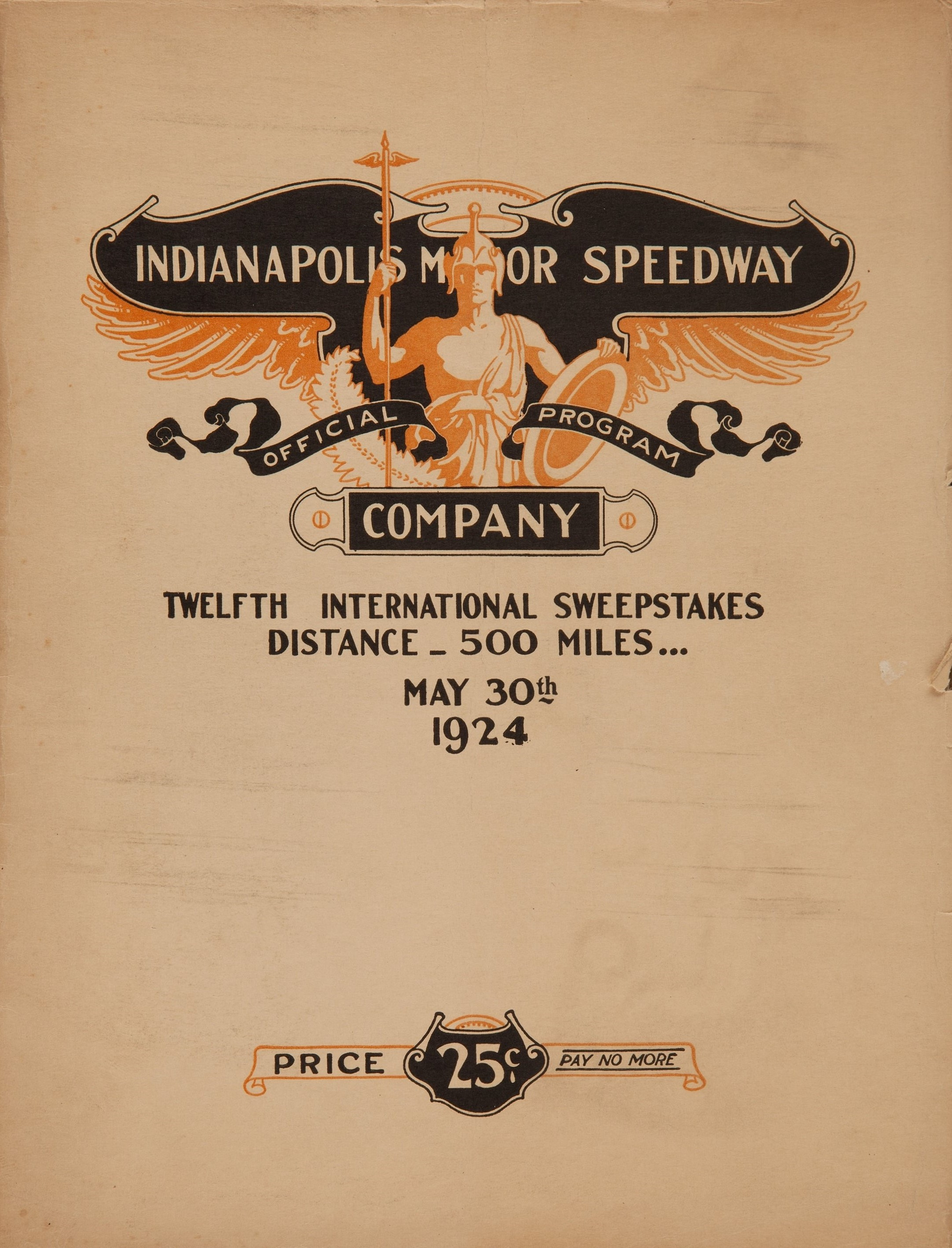

Indianapolis Motor Speedway

Indianapolis 500
- Sanctioning body: AAA
- Date: May 30, 1924
- Winner: L. L. Corum and Joe Boyer (co-winners)
- Winning Entrant: Duesenberg
- Winning Chief Mechanic: John Starost
- Winning time: 5:05:23.21
- Average speed: 98.234 mph (158.092 km/h)
- Pole position: Jimmy Murphy
- Pole speed: 108.037 mph (173.869 km/h)
- Most laps led: Earl Cooper (119)

Pre-race
- Pace car: Cole V8
- Pace car driver: Lew Pettijohn
- Starter: W. S. Gilbreath
- Honorary referee: Henry Ford
- Estimated attendance: 135,000-140,000

Chronology
Previous	Next
1923	1925

The 12th International 500-Mile Sweepstakes Race was held at the Indianapolis Motor Speedway on Friday, May 30, 1924.

L. L. Corum started the race in the #15 entry, and was relieved during the race by Joe Boyer. Boyer proceeded to drive the car to victory, and both drivers were credited as "co-winners" for the 1924 race.

Boyer led the first lap of the race in his original #9 entry. After Boyer got out of the car and took over the #15, the #9 entry continued in the race, taken over by Ernie Ansterburg, Corum, and later Thane Houser. Houser crashed the car after 176 laps, and Boyer's original car was credited with 18th place.

== Time trials ==
Four-lap (10 mile) qualifying runs were utilized. Jimmy Murphy won the pole position with a speed of over 108 mph.

== Starting grid ==
Row	Inside		Middle		Outside	
1	2	(United States) Jimmy Murphy W	4	(United States) Harry Hartz	5	(United States) Tommy Milton W
2	9	(United States) Joe Boyer	3	(United States) Bennett Hill	8	(United States) Earl Cooper
3	18	(United States) Jules Ellingboe	16	(United States) Cliff Durant	32	(France) Antoine Mourre R
4	10	(United States) Ernie Ansterburg R	7	(United States) Jerry Wunderlich	21	(United States) Frank Elliott
5	12	(United States) Pete DePaolo	1	(United States) Eddie Hearne	6	(United States) Ira Vail
6	14	(United States) Fred Comer R	31	(United States) Ora Haibe	19	(United States) Bob McDonogh R
7	26	(United States) Bill Hunt R	28	(United Kingdom) Alfred Moss R	15	(United States) L. L. Corum
8	27	(United States) Fred Harder R				

R Indianapolis 500 rookie
W Indianapolis 500 winner

== Race summary ==
The 1924 winning car

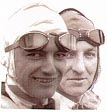
Co-winners L. L. Corum (left) and Joe Boyer (right)

After Joe Boyer, in his original car, led the first lap, Jimmy Murphy took the lead. By half-distance, Murphy led while Earl Cooper held 2nd. Fred Duesenberg, incensed that his lead car was behind four Miller vehicles, called Boyer into the pits, as his car had fallen behind with unscheduled pit stops. He then waved in his 5th-place car, driven by L. L. Corum, and installed Boyer in it. Duesenberg reportedly told him, "Catch them," referring to the Millers, "or burn this ship!"

Boyer re-entered the race with Corum's car and soon passed Bennett Hill and Harry Hartz. With 40 laps to go, he was about 1 mile behind leader Jimmy Murphy and Earl Cooper, turning laps at up to 104 mph.

Murphy was signaled that Boyer was rapidly closing and upped his pace, but he soon cut a tire and had to pit. Cooper assumed the lead but suffered the same fate after pushing harder. Cooper sped out of the pits and closed on Boyer. With 12 laps to go, Cooper made a passing attempt in turn 1, but skidded and again cut a tire, prompting another pit stop. Boyer then eased his pace to win the 500 with a record average speed of over 98 mph.

== Box score ==
Finish	Start	No	Name	Entrant	Car	Qual	Rank	Laps	Status
1	21	15	(United States) L. L. Corum (Laps 1–111) (United States) Joe Boyer (Laps 112–200)	Duesenberg	Duesenberg	93.330	16	200	98.236 mph
2	6	8	(United States) Earl Cooper	Earl Cooper	Miller	103.900	6	200	+1:23.97
3	1	2	(United States) Jimmy Murphy W	Jimmy Murphy	Miller	108.030	1	200	+3:02.18
4	2	4	(United States) Harry Hartz	R. Cliff Durant	Miller	107.130	2	200	+5:21.18
5	5	3	(United States) Bennett Hill	Harry A. Miller	Miller	104.840	5	200	+5:36.86
6	13	12	(United States) Peter DePaolo	Duesenberg Brothers	Duesenberg	99.280	13	200	+12:45.34
7	16	14	(United States) Fred Comer R (Wade Morton Laps 99–120)	R. Cliff Durant	Miller	92.880	17	200	+15:43.70
8	15	6	(United States) Ira Vail (C. W. Van Ranst Laps 162–200)	Ira Vail	Miller	96.400	15	200	+19:06.86
9	9	32	(France) Antoine Mourre R	Antoine Mourre	Miller	99.490	9	200	+21:32.41
10	18	19	(United States) Bob McDonogh R	Harry A. Miller	Miller	91.550	19	200	+26:03.52
11	7	18	(United States) Jules Ellingboe	Harry A. Miller	Miller	102.600	7	200	+26:13.38
12	11	7	(United States) Jerry Wunderlich (Wade Morton Laps 31–90) (Wade Morton Laps 158–187)	R. Cliff Durant	Miller	99.360	11	200	+45:33.61
13	8	16	(United States) Cliff Durant (Phil Shafer Laps 91–110) (Eddie Hearne)	R. Cliff Durant	Miller	101.610	8	199	Out of gas
14	19	26	(United States) Bill Hunt R	Barber-Warnock	Fronty-Ford T	85.040	21	191	Flagged
15	17	31	(United States) Ora Haibe (Elmer Dempsey Laps 101–121)	Albert Schmidt	Mercedes	92.810	18	182	Flagged
16	20	28	(United Kingdom) Alfred Moss R	Barber-Warnock	Fronty-Ford T	85.270	20	177	Flagged
17	22	27	(United States) Fred Harder R	Barber-Warnock	Fronty-Ford T	82.770	22	177	Flagged
18	4	9	(United States) Joe Boyer (Ernie Ansterburg Laps 93–158) (Thane Houser Laps 176)	Duesenberg Brothers	Duesenberg	104.840	4	176	Crash T1
19	14	1	(United States) Eddie Hearne (Cliff Durant Laps 123–137)	R. Cliff Durant	Miller	99.230	14	151	Fuel line
20	12	21	(United States) Frank Elliott	Frank R. Elliott	Miller	99.310	12	149	Gas tank
21	3	5	(United States) Tommy Milton W	Tommy Milton	Miller	105.200	3	110	Gas tank
22	10	10	(United States) Ernie Ansterburg R	Duesenberg	Duesenberg	99.400	10	2	Crash T2

Note: Relief drivers in parentheses

W Former Indianapolis 500 winner

R Indianapolis 500 Rookie

=== Race statistics ===
Lap Leaders
Laps	Leader
1	Joe Boyer
2–41	Jimmy Murphy
42	Earl Cooper
43	Jimmy Murphy
44–105	Earl Cooper
106–120	Jimmy Murphy
121–176	Earl Cooper
177–200	Joe Boyer

Total laps led
Leader	Laps
Earl Cooper	119
Jimmy Murphy	56
Joe Boyer	25

== Race details ==
- For 1924, riding mechanics were optional, however, no teams utilized them.
- First alternate: none
- Eddie Hearne was the lone entry in the race who competed in the inaugural Indy 500

Grand Prix Race
Previous race: 1923 Italian Grand Prix	1924 Grand Prix season Grandes Épreuves	Next race: 1924 French Grand Prix
Previous race: 1923 Indianapolis 500	Indianapolis 500	Next race: 1925 Indianapolis 500

1923 Indianapolis 500; Tommy Milton	1924 Indianapolis 500; L. L. Corum and Joe Boyer	1925 Indianapolis 500; Peter DePaolo
Preceded by 94.484 mph (1922 Indianapolis 500)	Record for the fastest average speed 98.234 mph	Succeeded by 101.127 mph (1925 Indianapolis 500)
