= Beverly Hills Speedway =

Auto racing track (1919-1924)

Beverly Hills Speedway (Los Angeles Speedway)
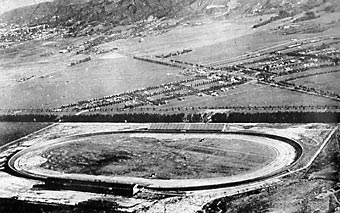
- Location: Beverly Hills, California, United States
- Coordinates: 34°03′58″N 118°24′8″W
- Owner: Beverly Hills Speedway Association
- Broke ground: 1919
- Opened: February 28, 1920
- Closed: 1924

Oval
- Surface: Wood
- Length: 1.25 mi (2.01 km)
- Turns: 4
- Banking: 37°

The Beverly Hills Speedway (also called the Los Angeles Speedway) was a 1.25-mile (2.01 km) wooden board track for automobile racing in Beverly Hills, California. It was built in 1919 on 275 acres (1.11 km^{2}) of land that includes the site of today's Beverly Wilshire Hotel, just outside the "Golden Triangle". The former site is bounded by Wilshire Boulevard, South Beverly Drive, Olympic Boulevard and Lasky Drive. The project was financed by a group of racers and businessmen that called itself the Beverly Hills Speedway Association. The track was the first in the United States to be designed with banked turns incorporating an engineering solution known as a spiral easement.

The Speedway operated for four years and attracted many historically significant competitors including Ralph DePalma, Jimmy Murphy, and Tommy Milton. It was also the site of a racing accident that killed National Champion (posthumous) and Indianapolis 500 winner Gaston Chevrolet in 1920.

Because of rapidly increasing real estate values, the Speedway became an uneconomical use of property. The track was torn down and the Association moved its racing operation a few miles away to Culver City, California in 1924.

== History ==
Wooden board tracks were already established in the United States prior to World War I, and such a track had already been successful in Southern California. The Los Angeles Motordrome in nearby Playa del Rey was the first-ever wooden track purpose-built for motorized competition. The Motordrome created a sensation when it was built in 1910, attracting large crowds of paying spectators for two years before it was destroyed by a fire.

The Speedway Association consisted of eleven members around a nucleus of racer Cliff Durant (son of General Motors' William C. Durant) and William Danziger of the Rodeo Land and Water Company, and included future three-time Indianapolis 500 winner Louis Meyer. The group purchased land from a bean farmer at $1,000 per acre (0.40 ha) in 1919 and began work once the farmer had harvested his crop.

The circular Motordrome in Playa del Rey had been built by contractor Jack Prince, a British former bicycle racer who was given the work on the strength of his experience building velodromes. Prince had subsequently built a number of oval tracks, many of which suffered from badly designed transitions between the straightaways and curves. The Association's civil engineer, Art Pillsbury, turned to Prince for consultation, found that he was a capable builder but was "quite innocent of any engineering knowledge," and so resorted to a method used by railroads, called the Searle Spiral Easement Curve, to design the track's layout and contours.

Prince and Pillsbury had set out to build the fastest race track in the nation, and they may have succeeded. At the inaugural event for the brand new facility, which was also the opening race of the 1920 Championship season, victorious Jimmy Murphy averaged more than 103 miles per hour (166 km/h) in the 250-mile (400 km) contest, a pace that was not seen in time trials at the much larger Indianapolis Motor Speedway until 1923. The race was attended by 50,000 fans.

In addition to racing, the Speedway hosted other events such as horse shows, and was used as a movie location. The Speedway hosted the opening and closing rounds of the Championship for its first three years, and only hosted a single contest in 1924. The final race was held February 24, 1924, before a crowd of 85,000. On that day Harlan Fengler broke the world record for a 250-mile (400 km) race, averaging 116.6 miles per hour (187.6 km/h).

After just four years, the 70,000-seat stadium was disassembled to make room for other improvements, as the land was deemed more valuable than the track that lay atop it. The property was sold to a developer for $10,000 per acre. The track closed in 1924. By 1928, the Beverly Wilshire hotel was built on the site of the track's north-west turn. The Speedway Association later opened a new track in Culver City, just south of MGM studios.

== Races ==
Statistics for winners of each race.

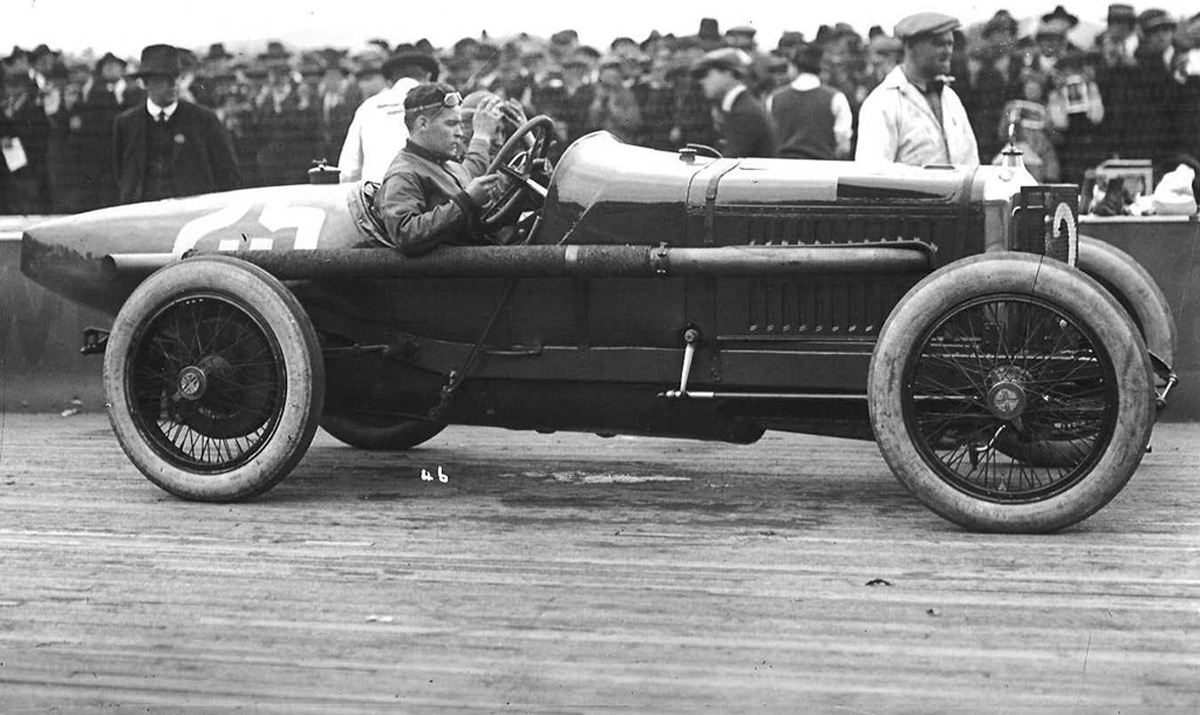
Bennett Hill at Beverly Hills in 1920

Date	Driver	Distance (miles)^{1}	Car	Average speed	
Date	Driver	Distance (miles)^{1}	Car	mph	km/h
February 28, 1920	Jimmy Murphy	250	Duesenberg	103.2	166.1
March 28, 1920	Art Klein	50	Peugeot	110.8	178.3
March 28, 1920	Jimmy Murphy	50	Duesenberg	110.3	177.5
March 28, 1920	Tommy Milton	50	Duesenberg	111.8	179.9
November 25, 1920^{2}	Roscoe Sarles	250	Duesenberg	103.2	166.1
February 27, 1921	Ralph DePalma	25	Ballot	106.46	171.33
February 27, 1921	Roscoe Sarles	25	Duesenberg	107.27	172.63
February 27, 1921	Jimmy Murphy	25	Duesenberg	103.75	166.97
February 27, 1921	Tommy Milton	25	Miller	104.30	167.85
February 27, 1921	Ralph DePalma	50	Ballot	107.39	172.83
April 10, 1921	Ralph DePalma	25	Ballot	106.3	171.1
April 10, 1921	Eddie Pullen	25	Duesenberg	107.9	173.6
April 10, 1921	Joe Thomas	25	Duesenberg	105.8	170.3
April 10, 1921	Jimmy Murphy	25	Duesenberg	107.3	172.7
April 10, 1921	Jimmy Murphy	50	Duesenberg	109.26	175.84
November 24, 1921	Eddie Hearne	250	Duesenberg	109.7	176.5
March 5, 1922	Tommy Milton	250	Durant-Miller	110.8	178.3
April 2, 1922	Pietro Bordino	25	Fiat	114.84	184.82
April 2, 1922	Tommy Milton	25	Durant-Miller	115.17	185.35
April 2, 1922	Jimmy Murphy	25	Duesenberg	114.22	183.82
April 2, 1922	Frank Elliott	25	Miller	114.52	184.30
April 2, 1922	Tommy Milton	50	Durant-Miller	115.24	185.46
December 3, 1922	Jimmy Murphy	250	Miller	114.6	184.4
February 25, 1923	Jimmy Murphy	250	Miller	115.65	186.12
November 29, 1923	Bennett Hill	250	Miller	112.42	180.92
February 24, 1924	Harlan Fengler	250	Miller	116.6	187.6

1. 500 mi ≈ 800 km, 250 mi ≈ 400 km and 25 mi ≈ 40 km
2. Gaston Chevrolet and Eddie O'Donnell collided and crashed into one another during the Thanksgiving Day Beverly Hills Speedway Classic race. Chevrolet and O'Donnell died in the crash, and Lyall Jolls, Chevrolet's riding mechanic, died the next day.

== See also ==
- AAA Contest Board
- American Championship car racing
