= Maserati 420M/58 =

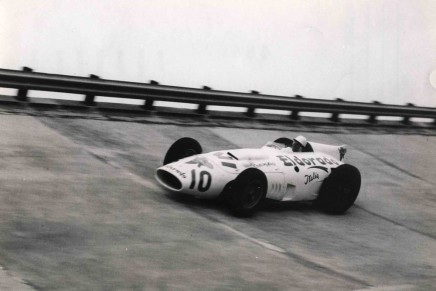
- Maserati 420M/58 "Eldorado"
- Constructor: Maserati
- Designer: Giulio Alfieri

Technical specifications
- Chassis: Tubular steel spaceframe
- Suspension (front): Independent double wishbones, coil springs, Houdaille hydraulic dampers
- Suspension (rear): De Dion axle, transverse leaf spring, Houdaille hydraulic dampers
- Length: 4,800 mm (189.0 in)
- Width: 1,200 mm (47.2 in)
- Height: 1,100 mm (43.3 in)
- Wheelbase: 2,400 mm (94.5 in)
- Engine: 4,190 cc (255.7 cu in) 90° V8 naturally-aspirated front-engine, longitudinally mounted
- Transmission: 2-speed manual transmission
- Weight: 758 kg (1,671.1 lb)
- Tyres: Firestone

Competition history
- Notable entrants: Officine Alfieri Maserati; Eldorado Racing
- Notable drivers: (United Kingdom) Stirling Moss (United States) Ralph Liguori
- Debut: 1958 Race of Two Worlds
- Last event: 1959 Indianapolis 500
Entries	Races	Wins	Podiums
2	1	0	0

The Maserati 420M/58 Eldorado was a single-seater manufactured by Maserati in 1958. It was a one-off race car purpose-built for the second edition of the 500 Miles of Monza. It was the first single-seater in Europe to be sponsored by a brand not attached to an automobile industry. The internal Maserati classification was the Tipo 4, behind the 250F variants, and also referred to as the 420/M/58 for 4.2-litre displacement, Monoposto or a single-seater in Italian and 1958 year, or simply as the "Eldorado".

In 2020, Maserati paid homage to Sir Stirling Moss, who died on 12 April 2020 at the age of 90, by decorating a prototype of the Maserati MC20 with the 'Stirling Moss' script from the "Eldorado" single seater.

Currently the Maserati "Eldorado", with bodywork and livery restored to its 1958 specification, is part of the Umberto Panini's Maserati collection in Modena.

== Development ==
Maserati was the last manufacturer from Europe to win Indianapolis 500 races in 1939 and 1940. In 1957 and 1958 Tony Parravano entered Maserati-engined racers in this race. Their engine, based on the V8 from 450S was also a basis for the Race of Two Worlds Maserati race car but with a shorter stroke to fit the Indy regulations.

By the end of the 1957 Formula One season, after securing World Championship won with Juan Manuel Fangio, Maserati withdrew from racing as a factory entrant. This decision was mainly dictated by financial situation but allowed Maserati to pursue building road and racing cars for private customers. For the second edition of the 500 Miles of Monza, Maserati was commissioned the creation of a suitable car to compete against American entries. This lucrative order was an idea of Eldorado Sud, ice-cream company as a sponsorship venture. The race car was built from parts of already existing racing projects, mainly the Maserati 250F. Within a space of a couple months, the chief-engineer Giulio Alfieri was responsible for creating the "Eldorado". It would use the modified Maserati 250F chassis with 450S-sourced engine.

=== Sponsorship ===
The change towards race cars commissions was ideal for privateer such as Gino Zanetti as it would allow him to promote his business and meant a lucrative deal for Maserati. Zanetti was the owner of the Eldorado Sud ice-cream company and had pioneered a racing world sponsorship. He would become the first major sponsor of a European racing team that was not related to any automobile industry.

The race car was not only adorned with a sponsor's logo but the entire car was painted in desired, company colours with the company trademarks added along the sides and front, with the company names and young cowboy logos featured in multiple locations on the car. Also a bright racing red "Italia" script was added to denote the nationality of the sponsor and that of the car's manufacturer.

This was the first instance when a sponsorship colours replaced the traditional, national colour assigned by the International Federation. This decision was monumental in motorsport history and would soon open the flood-gates for sponsorship deals and financial backers from outside the race car world.

=== Bodywork ===
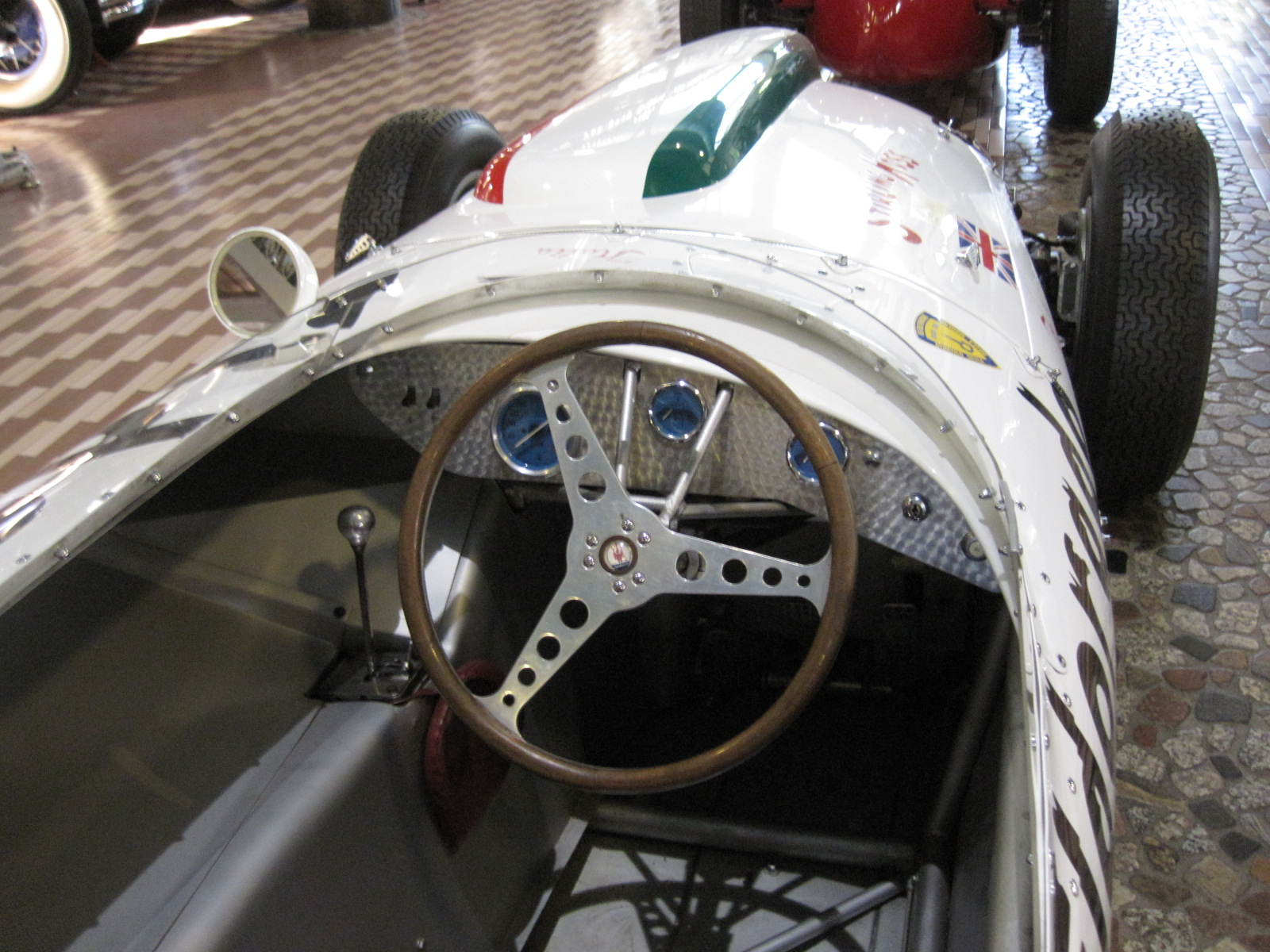
A spartan cabin for the driver with only rudimentary instruments and controls. Visible chassis frame tubes.

The bodywork was created out of aluminium as an open-wheel single-seater and was hand-crafted by Medardo Fantuzzi at his Carrozzeria in Modena. The characteristic vertical tail-fin was added, just behind the driver's head for stability as the speeds achieved could reach 350 km/h (217 mph). Also the bodywork featured an additional offset hood scoop for carburetors and a long and low nose. The small deflector was installed to serve as a windshield.

The bodywork was later modified after the first race and the original fin and the headrest were removed. Further the hood scoop was reduced and an additional, mandatory roll bar installed when the car raced at the Indianapolis 500.

== Specifications ==
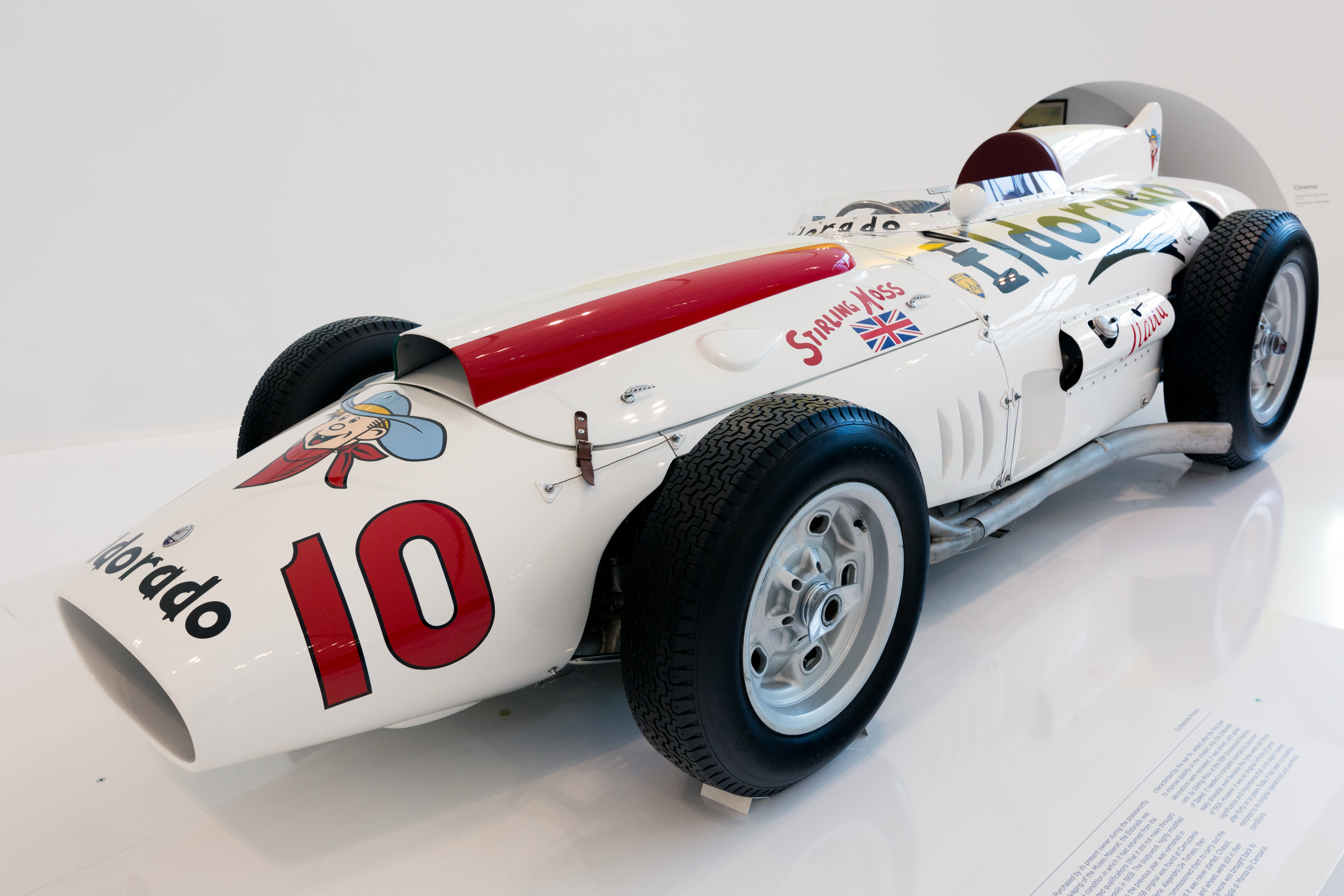
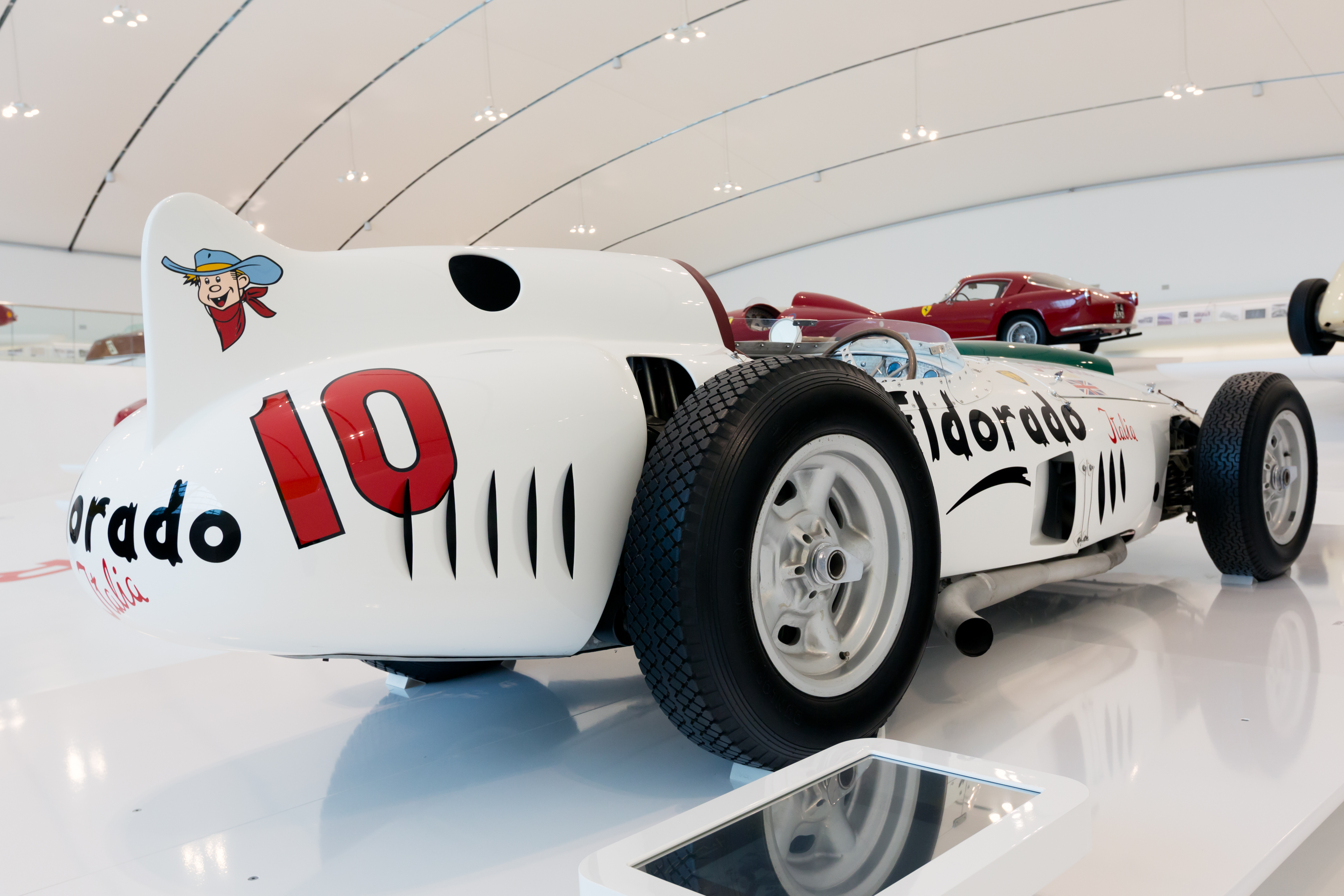
Maserati 420M/58 "Eldorado" in Enzo Ferrari Museum

=== Engine and transmission ===
The 420M/58 engine was derived from the Maserati 450S sports car. The twin cam 90° V8 was modified with a shorter stroke to reduce the displacement to 4,190 cc (4.2 L; 255.7 cu in) so it could also meet the Indy 500 technical regulations. The fuel was fed by four twin-choke Weber carburetors to produce 410 PS (302 kW; 404 hp) at 8,000 rpm with 12:1 compression ratio. The engine was lubricated via dry sump system and was equipped with twin spark plugs per cylinder.

The engine produced so much power and torque that only a two-speed gearbox was used. The first gear was only used to start from the pits. Additionally, the De Dion rear axle had no differential at all, as the final drive was solid.

Both the engine and transmission were offset to the left by 90 mm (3.5 in), with a better weight distribution in mind, taking into account the high banked corners at Monza.

=== Chassis and suspension ===
The chassis was derived from the final evolution of the highly successful Maserati 250F Formula One racer. The tubular steel space frame construction was further reinforced to withstand the high-speed cornering on the concrete banks at Monza. The car received the chassis number 4203.

The typical wire wheels were replaced by Halibrand alloys to withstand the high cornering forces. To reduce the weight, the alloy used was magnesium, along with Firestone 18-inch braided tread tires filled with helium to save as much weight as possible.

The front suspension consisted of double wishbones, taken from the Maserati 450S race car, and the rear of a De Dion axle. The hydraulic drum brakes were identical as those on the 250F. The whole car weighed 758 kg (1,671 lb).

== Racing ==
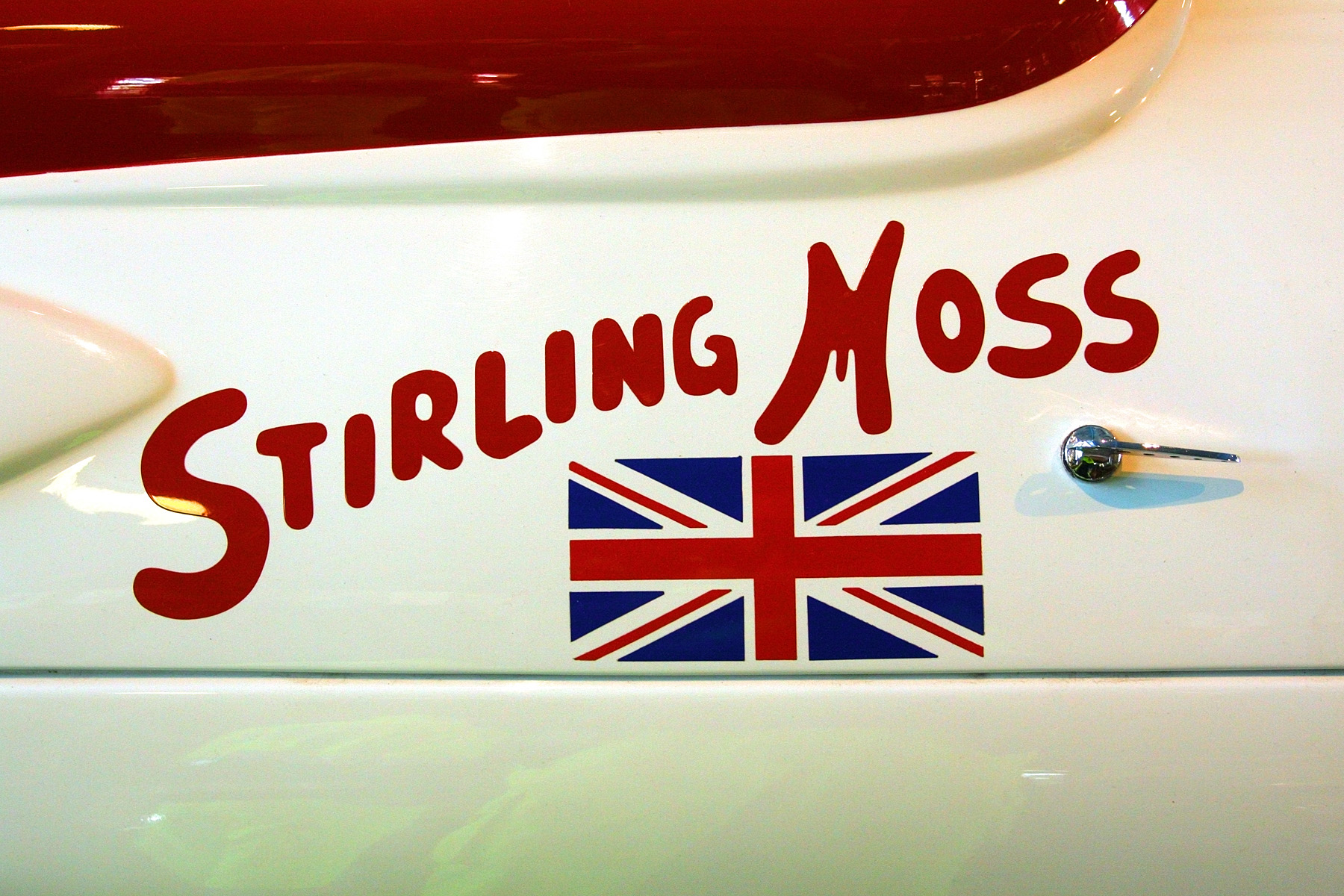
Closeup of the 'Stirling Moss' script adorning both sides of the bonnet. The very same was printed on the Maserati MC20 prototype in honour of the driver.

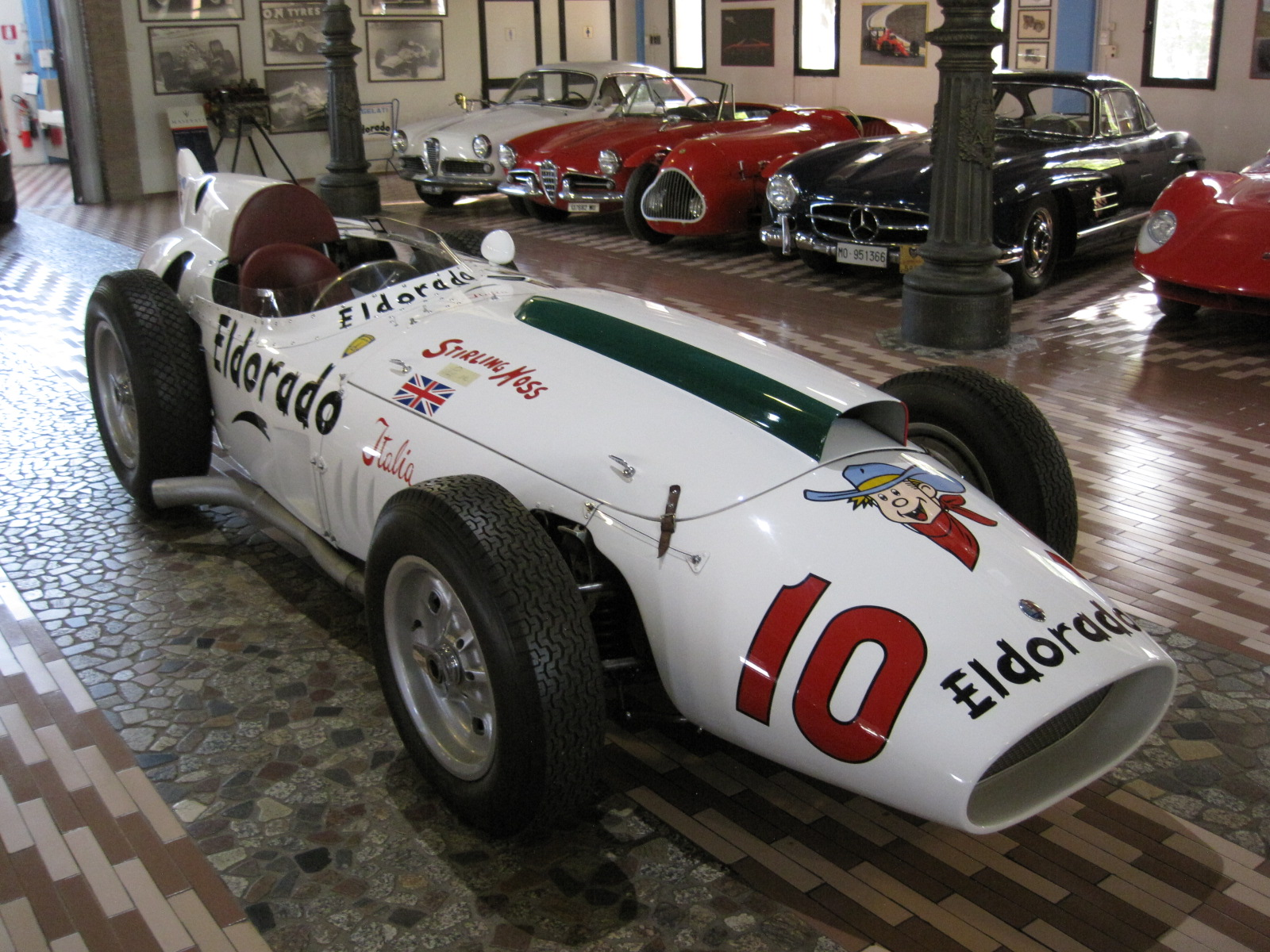
The "Eldorado" residing at the Panini Motor Museum in Modena, Italy.

=== Race of Two Worlds ===
The Race of Two Worlds (Trofeo dei Due Mondi in Italian) was first held in 1957, as an attempt for the European and American race cars to compete on the same track. Even though the Indianapolis 500 had been part of the World Championship, not many European entries were seen there. After 1955, the Monza circuit had been reconfigured and new concrete oval banking erected in an image of Indy 500. The race was run under the Indianapolis 500 regulations and the first edition was dominated by American entries. The unique Maserati 420M/58 was to be driven by a former works driver Stirling Moss. His opposition for the race was made up mainly of American Indy racers with three Ferraris, a pair of Jaguar D-Types and the unique Lister–Jaguar.

The Race of Two World would be the first outing for the 420M/58, but not as factory entry but under privateer Eldorado racing team. During the qualification the Maserati, driven by Stirling Moss ended up in eleventh place for the start. The actual race held on 29 June 1958, at the Monza track, was divided into three heats.

After the first heat Moss elevated his position to a fourth place. The second heat he finished as the fifth driver. During the final heat, being fourth overall, his steering broke on 41st lap and the car went into the rails at around 250–260 km/h (155–162 mph). Luckily Moss walked away from the accident and the car was only lightly damaged. He would later describe it as the "scariest motor racing accident of his career". Even though he could achieve a third place on the podium the overall score was a seventh place overall, taking into account all the heats and the total number of laps finished.

Once again the American cars proved superior on the oval track. The race itself was partially a success in terms of a spectator numbers but it was not organised for the 1959 season.

=== Indianapolis 500 ===
The 1939 and 1940 Indianapolis 500 races were won by Maserati with 8CTF 'Boyle Special'. Wilbur Shaw almost scored a victory for the third time in 1941, but was forced to withdraw with a broken wheel. Maserati would return to Indy 500 with a 420M/58 for its 1959 edition. The car, previously damaged, was repaired and slightly rebodied to fit a different race requirements. The Carrozzeria Allegretti e Gentilini removed the rear fin and lowered the hood scoop. The engine oil tank was repositioned to the left for better weight balance. The livery was finished in Italian racing red but still retained the Eldorado sponsorship name and logos. The intended driver was Ralph Liguori representing a privateer Eldorado Racing team.

The car had problems during qualifying stage and set the 36th fastest time out of only the first 33 qualifying. The faulty fuel pick-up prevented it from entering the actual race. This also proved to be the car's last outing.

== See also ==
Other Race of Two Worlds race cars:

- Ferrari 412 MI
- Ferrari 326 MI
- Ferrari 375 Indianapolis
- Jaguar D-Type
