= Lister-Jaguar Monza =

Lister-Jaguar Coupe (Lister Le Mans Coupe)
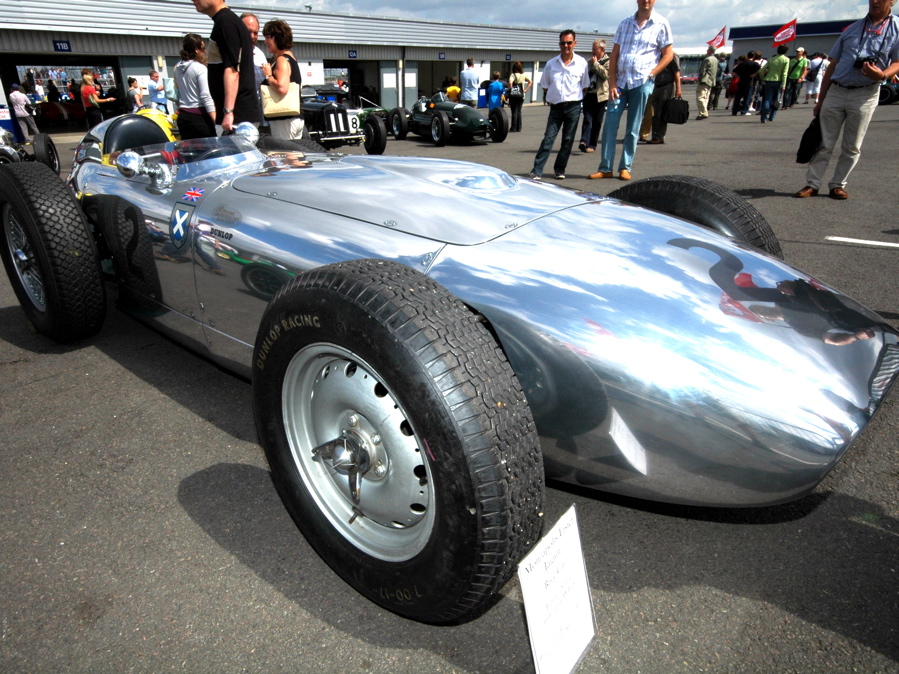
- Category: U.S.A.C. IndyCar/Formula Libre
- Constructor: Lister

Technical specifications
- Chassis: Steel-reinforced tubular space frame covered in aluminum panels
- Suspension (front): Double wishbones, coil springs over telescopic shock absorbers
- Suspension (rear): De Dion axle, twin trailing arms, coil springs over telescopic shock absorbers
- Engine: Front-engine, longitudinally mounted, 3.8 L (232 cu in), Jaguar XK, Straight-six engine, NA
- Transmission: 4-speed manual
- Power: 306 hp (228 kW)

Competition history

The Lister Jaguar Monza, nicknamed the Monzanapolis, was an open-wheel race car, designed, developed and built by British manufacturer Lister Motor Company, and raced by Scottish team Ecurie Ecosse at the special Race of Two Worlds, in 1958.
