= Edgar Elder =

American race car driver and car builder

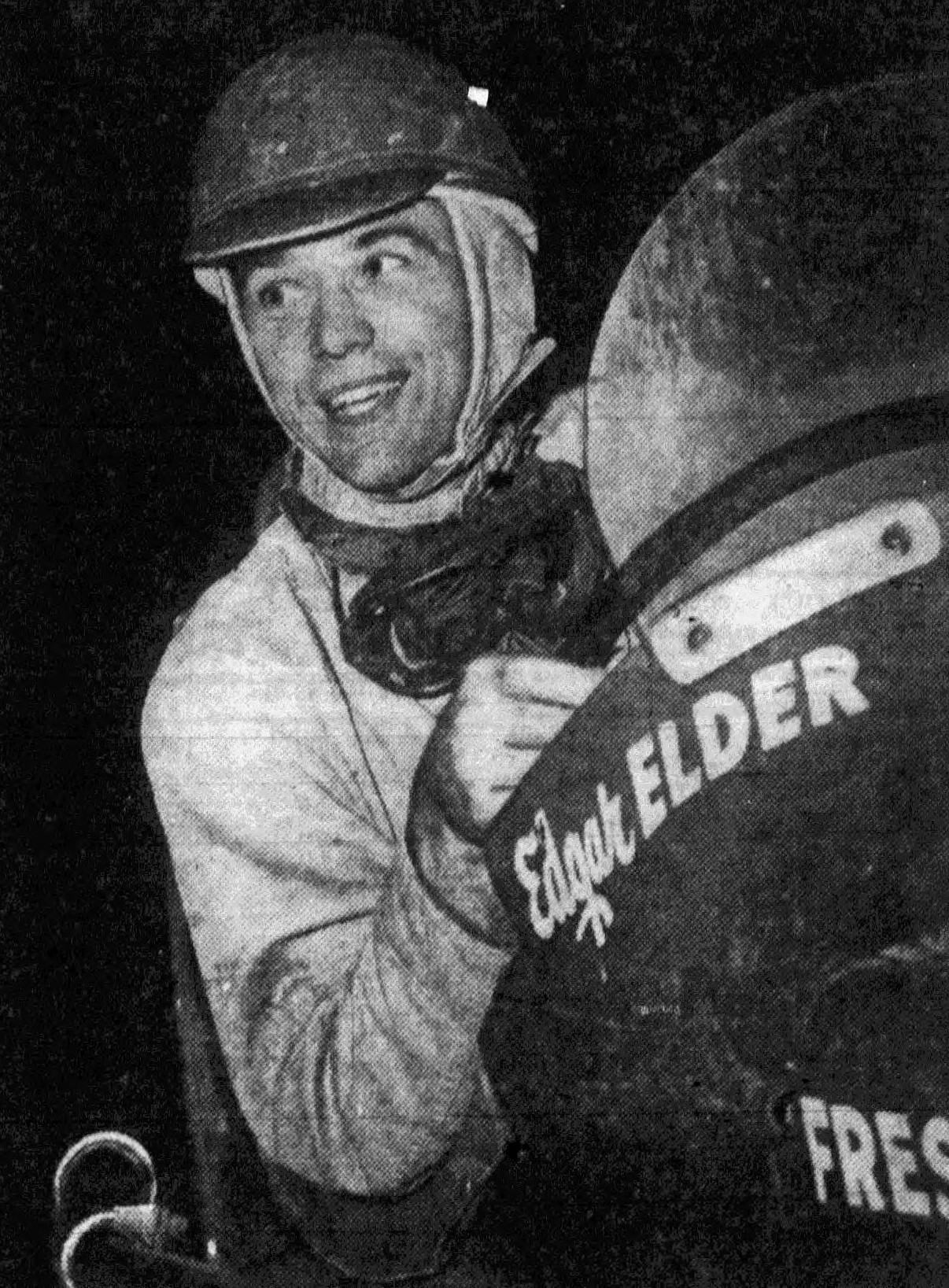
Elder, circa 1951

Edgar Elder was an American race car driver and racing car builder. A car built by Elder competed in one FIA World Championship race - the 1959 Indianapolis 500.

== World Championship Indianapolis 500 results ==
Season	Driver	Grid	Classification	Points	Note	Race Report
1959	Ray Crawford	32	23		Transmission	Report
