= Ferrari 412 MI =

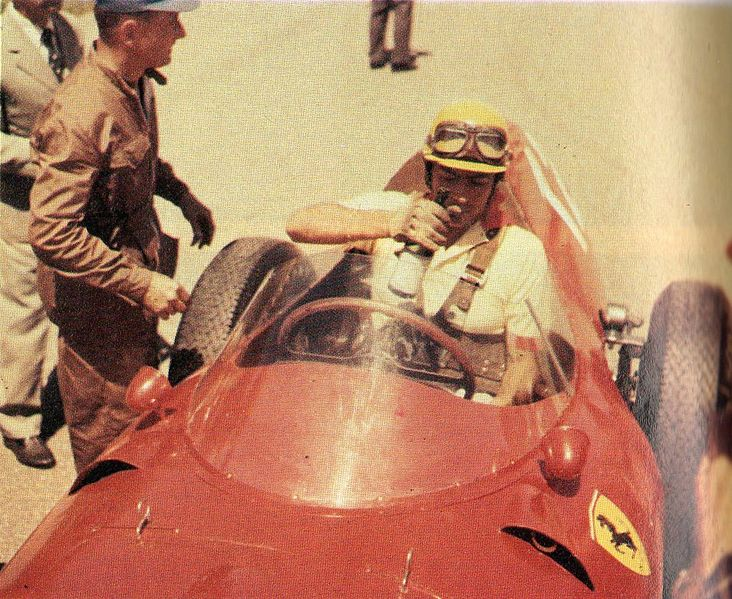
- Constructor: Ferrari
- Designer(s): Carlo Chiti; Vittorio Jano

Technical specifications
- Chassis: Tubular steel spaceframe
- Suspension (front): independent double wishbones, coil springs, hydraulic shock absorbers, anti-roll bar
- Suspension (rear): De Dion axle, twin radius arms, transverse leaf spring, hydraulic shock absorbers
- Axle track: F: 1,296 mm (51.0 in); R: 1,310 mm (51.6 in)
- Wheelbase: 2,300 mm (90.6 in)
- Engine: Jano Tipo 141 4,023.32 cc (245.5 cu in) 60° V12 naturally-aspirated front-engine, longitudinally mounted
- Transmission: 3-speed manual transmission
- Tyres: F: 6.70 x 16; R: 8.00 x 18; Firestone

Competition history
- Notable entrants: Scuderia Ferrari
- Notable drivers: (Italy) Luigi Musso (United Kingdom) Mike Hawthorn (United States) Phil Hill
- Debut: 1958 Race of Two Worlds
Entries	Races	Wins	Podiums	Poles
1	1	0	1	1

The Ferrari 412 MI was a single-seater produced by Italian manufacturer Ferrari in 1958. It was a one-off purpose-built racer for the second edition of the 500 Miles of Monza to compete against American race cars. The 412 MI scored a pole position and finished the race on a third place, which was the best European-entry result. As per naming convention "412" stood for 4-litre, 12-cylinder engine. The "MI" suffix stood for "Monza-Indianapolis".

== Development ==
At the Autodromo Nazionale Monza in 1958, the second race between European single seaters and sports cars and the American purpose-built racers was held. The track was prepared in 1955 in the Indianapolis oval circuit style with banked curves. The race was divided into 3 267 km (165.9 mi) legs, for a total of 804.7 km (500 mi). It was the fastest race at that time with a highest speeds recorded at 284 km/h (176.5 mph), compared to a record of 235.0 km/h (146 mph) at the 1958 Indianapolis 500. Ferrari entered three cars in this race to Indycar regulations.

The 412 MI was the most powerful Ferrari entry in the Race of Two Worlds. The car combined an older 375 F1-sourced chassis with new bodywork and a modified 4.0-litre V12 engine from the 335 S sports car. High capacity engines were superfluous in light of the 3-litre cap regulations instilled for the 1958 season. Ferrari chose to use the same Firestone tyres as American teams, rather than the Belgian Englebert tyre supplier the company had used at that time. This decision was due to the fear that they were not suitable for a high-speed track and might throw threads.

The Ferrari 412 MI prepared for this race was to be driven by Luigi Musso and Mike Hawthorn duo.

== Specifications ==
=== Engine and transmission ===
The 412 MI had a 60° Jano V12 engine mounted longitudinally in the front. The engine was sourced from the 335 S sports car that ran in the 1957 Mille Miglia. The internal measurements remained the same as the donor-engine at 77 by 72 mm (3.0 by 2.8 in) of bore and stroke. The resulting total displacement was 4,023.32 cc (4.0 L; 245.5 cu in). The much higher compression ratio of 9.9:1 and higher redline resulted in a significant increase of power, now producing 447 PS (329 kW; 441 hp) at 7700 rpm. It was the most powerful engine Ferrari had produced to that time. The engine had a DOHC configuration to actuate two valves per cylinder. Fuel and air mixture was fed by six Weber 42DCN carburettors, slightly smaller than the 335 S had. A dry-sump lubrication system was standard on all Jano V12s. Racing transmission was a three-speed only.

=== Chassis and suspension ===
The tubular steel spaceframe chassis was based on an older Formula One Ferrari 375, modified to accommodate new engine. The front suspension was independent with double wishbones, coil springs instead of A-leaf springs and hydraulic shock absorbers. The rear suspension had a De Dion axle with twin radius arms, transverse leaf spring and hydraulic shock absorbers. Anti-roll bars were installed as they were not originally present on the 1950-made 375 F1 chassis. Brakes were of a drum type and the fuel tank had a capacity of 204 litres.

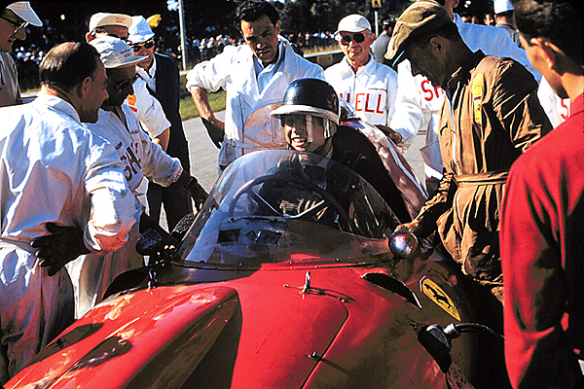
Mike Hawthorn during practice.

== Racing ==
Initially Mike Hawthorn was assigned to drive the Ferrari 412 MI #12 for the 1958 edition of the Race of Two Worlds. But when he felt unwell, his teammate Luigi Musso had to run the race. Hawthorn and Phil Hill drove the car later, as relief drivers. Qualifying began late on Friday when the track had dried up. Luigi Musso recorded the fastest time of all the European entries, with a 55.3 second lap in the 412 MI. He was only 0.1 seconds slower than Fangio in the Kuzma-Offy racer. But since the qualifying was determined by an average speed of three laps, and Musso was able to improve on his previous performance and recorded an average speed of 280.8 km/h (174.5 mph) to earn pole position for the race.

Heat one began with a rolling start of eighteen cars, as Fangio withdrew early with a cracked piston. Musso traded off the lead position with Eddie Sachs, with Jimmy Bryan also taking second place. As Jim Rathmann took the lead from the Sachs, the latter retired with a broken connecting rod. This allowed Musso to jump to a second place, but after a methanol fumes inhalation, he dropped back a couple of places and had to be relieved by Hawthorn on lap 27. Hawthorn gave the car back to Musso on the last lap of the first heat and Musso had secured sixth place and 60 laps.

During heat two of the race, Musso was once again among the top drivers. After only nineteen laps he had to be replaced by Phil Hill whose Ferrari 326 MI #14 had retired with a broken magneto in the first heat. Hill drove the car till the end of the heat, managed to secure another 60 laps but dropped to ninth place.

Heat three was started by Mike Hawthorn in the 412 MI, in place of Luigi Musso. After 24 laps Hawthorn succumbed to methanol fumes as Musso in heat one and had to be relieved by Phil Hill. Hill brought the team up to the third place. He gave the car back to Hawthorn, who secured yet another 60 laps and finished the race for third overall for Ferrari.

Because of the very high speeds and safety issues, the Race of Two Worlds for the 1959 season was cancelled and had never returned. Ferrari, unlike Maserati, did not pursue this form of racing and did not participate in the 1959 Indianapolis 500 race.

== See also ==
Other Race of Two Worlds race cars:

- Ferrari 326 MI
- Ferrari 375 Indianapolis
- Maserati 420M/58
- Jaguar D-Type
