= Race of Two Worlds =

Italian automobile race

The trophy awarded to Jimmy Bryan for winning the 1957 running of the Race of Two Worlds.

The Race of Two Worlds (Trofeo dei Due Mondi in Italian), also known as the 500 Miglia di Monza (500 Miles of Monza), was an automobile race held at the Autodromo Nazionale Monza, Italy in 1957 and again in 1958. It was intended as an exhibition event, allowing American teams from the United States Auto Club (USAC) National Championship to compete directly against teams from the Formula One World Championship based in Europe. The two types of cars competed on the banked oval at Monza which had been completed in 1955. Due to the similarity to the Indianapolis Motor Speedway, where the USAC teams ran the Indianapolis 500, the event earned the nickname Monzanapolis.

American drivers and teams won the event in both the years in which it was run. Jimmy Bryan won the 1957 event, and Jim Rathmann swept the 1958 race. Although some Formula One teams did participate and even built special cars specifically for the event, several withdrew over safety concerns. Continued concern over the speeds on the track and the cost of the event led to the race being canceled after the 1958 running.

== Initial concept ==
In 1954, redevelopment of the Autodromo Nazionale Monza circuit began for the first time since 1948, concentrating on rebuilding the oval portion of the track which had been abandoned during World War II. The 4.5 kilometres (2.8 mi) banked oval, which had last been used in 1933, was dismantled. The southern Sud Alta Velocita corner was relocated, moving it northward by several meters, shortening the lap distance length to 4.25 km (2.64 mi). Both banked corners were rebuilt on a curving gradient which reached 80 degrees, replacing the flat banking which had been previously used. The reconstruction was completed in August 1955, in time for the Formula One Italian Grand Prix, which combined the new oval with the Monza road course for a full 9.8 km (6.1 mi).

The Monza oval (highlighted), as situated over the rest of the road course circuit. In that race, cars ran in an anticlockwise direction like on US ovals, opposite that primarily used by Formula One as indicated with red arrows.

The following year, Giuseppe Bacciagaluppi, then president of the Automobile Club of Milan and chairman of the Autodromo Nazionale Monza, invited Duane Carter, competition director of USAC, to attend the second running of the Italian Grand Prix on the new circuit. The two discussed the similarities between Monza's new oval and the Indianapolis Motor Speedway, which also held a round of the 1957 Formula One season, the Indianapolis 500. Although the 500 counted as part of the championship, only a few Europeans attempted to participate in the event since the formation of the World Championship. Ferrari's Alberto Ascari in 1952 was the only European competitor to actually qualify for the race. Bacciagaluppi and Carter believed that an oval race held in Europe instead of the United States could attract Formula One teams, and USAC and the Automobile Club of Italy began work on making such an event possible.

A race was scheduled for June 1957, running just the 4.25 km oval at Monza. Volunteering USAC teams were to be transported from the United States, while Formula One teams were also free to participate if they chose. In preparation, Firestone Tire and Rubber Company transported a USAC Kurtis Kraft–Chrysler to Monza in April 1957 in order to conduct tests on tyres made for the event. American driver Pat O'Connor completed 364 km (226 mi) on the oval, setting a best lap speed of 273 km/h (170 mph), nearly 48 km/h (30 mph) faster than lap speeds reached at Indianapolis.

=== Format ===
The rules for the race were based on those used by USAC in North America. Engines were limited to 4,200 cubic centimetres (260 cu in) in naturally aspirated form, 2,800 cm^{3} (170 cu in) for supercharged engines. A USAC rolling start was also used, instead of Formula One's usual standing start. The race was planned for a distance of 500 miles (800 km), similar to the Indianapolis 500. However, unlike Indianapolis, the 500 miles would not be run continuously. Instead, three separate 63-lap heats were planned, with an hour break for repairs and rest between each heat, for a total of approximately 500 miles. The overall race winner would be determined by the driver which finished all three heats with the highest average speed. The circuit would be run in an anti-clockwise direction, the same used at Indianapolis, but opposite the direction used by Formula One at Monza.

== 1957 ==
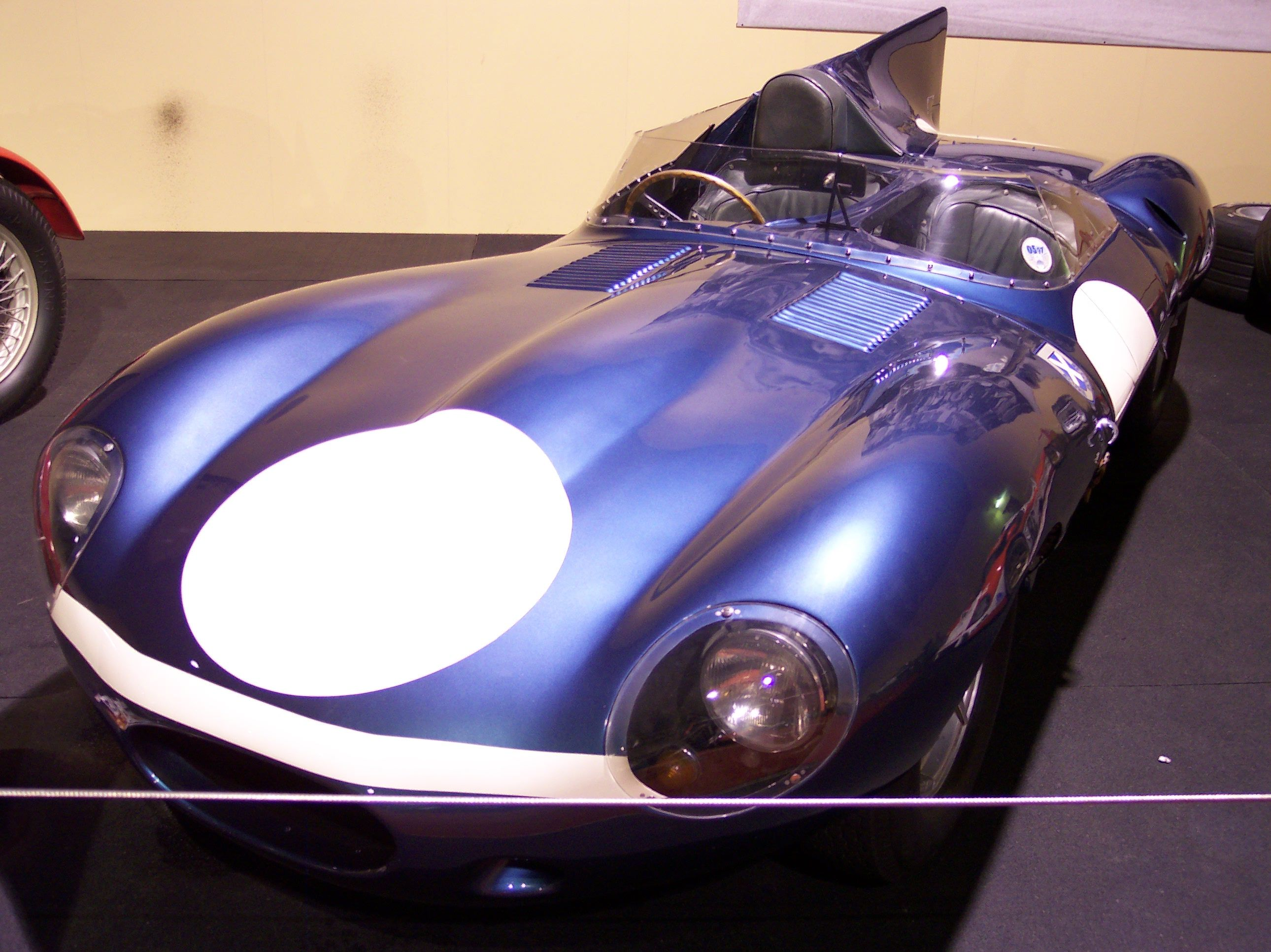
An Ecurie Ecosse Jaguar D-Type

The inaugural running of the Race of Two Worlds was scheduled for Sunday, June 29, shortly after the running of the Indianapolis 500, and a few weeks before the running of the French Grand Prix. USAC's entries in the event traveled from Indianapolis to New York City, whence they were shipped to Genoa. The drivers and personnel traveled separately from their cars, arriving by plane. The teams and equipment were then transported from Genoa to Monza, where teams began practice on Tuesday the 18th.

=== Entrants ===
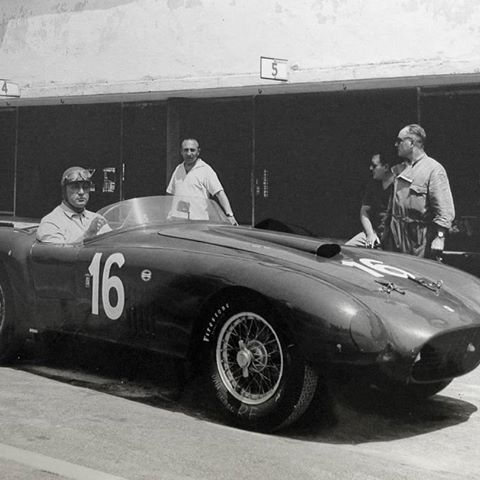
Mario Borniggia in Ferrari 275 S/340 America.

Fifteen cars were entered for the event. Ten cars traveled across the Atlantic from USAC, while only two teams arrived with Formula One equipment. Mario Bornigia used a privateer Ferrari, while Maserati entered their factory driver Jean Behra. The rest of the Formula One teams however chose to boycott the event. The Union des Pilotes Professionnels Internationaux (International Union of Professional Pilots), which had been formed only a few months prior, cited the dangers of the speeds able to be obtained on the Monza banking and the wear on tires posing threats to safety. A further three entries arrived from the World Sportscar Championship, thanks to the Scottish Ecurie Ecosse Jaguar team, who had just won the 24 Hours of Le Mans the weekend before.

Number	Driver	Entrant	Chassis	Engine	Tyre
1	(United States) Jimmy Bryan	Dean Van Lines	Kuzma	Offenhauser	F
2	(United Kingdom) John Lawrence	Ecurie Ecosse	Jaguar D-Type	Jaguar	D
4	(United Kingdom) Jack Fairman	Ecurie Ecosse	Jaguar D-Type	Jaguar	D
6	(United Kingdom) Ninian Sanderson	Ecurie Ecosse	Jaguar D-Type	Jaguar	D
7	(United States) Bob Veith	Bob Estes	Phillips	Offenhauser	F
8	(France) Jean Behra	Maserati	Maserati 250F	Maserati	F
8	(France) Jean Behra	Maserati	Maserati 450S^{1}	Maserati	F
12	(United States) Pat O'Connor	Sumar	Kurtis Kraft 500G	Offenhauser	F
16	(Italy) Mario Borniggia	Scuderia Cottione	Ferrari	Ferrari	?
27	(United States) Tony Bettenhausen	Novi Auto Air Conditioning	Kurtis Kraft 500F	Novi (s/c)	F
35	(United States) Eddie Sachs	Jim Robbins	Kurtis Kraft 500G	Offenhauser	F
49	(United States) Ray Crawford	Meguiar Mirror Glaze	Kurtis Kraft 500G	Offenhauser	F
52	(United States) Troy Ruttman	John Zink	Watson	Offenhauser	F
52	(United States) Jim Rathmann^{2}	John Zink	Watson	Offenhauser	F
54	(United States) Paul Russo	Novi Auto Air Conditioning	Kurtis Kraft 500F	Novi (s/c)	F
73	(United States) Andy Linden	McNamara Veedol	Kurtis Kraft 500G	Offenhauser	F
98	(United States) Johnnie Parsons	Agajanian	Kuzma	Offenhauser	F

Key
Colour	Car Type
Gray	USAC
Red	Formula One
Blue	Sportscar

=== Practice and qualifying ===
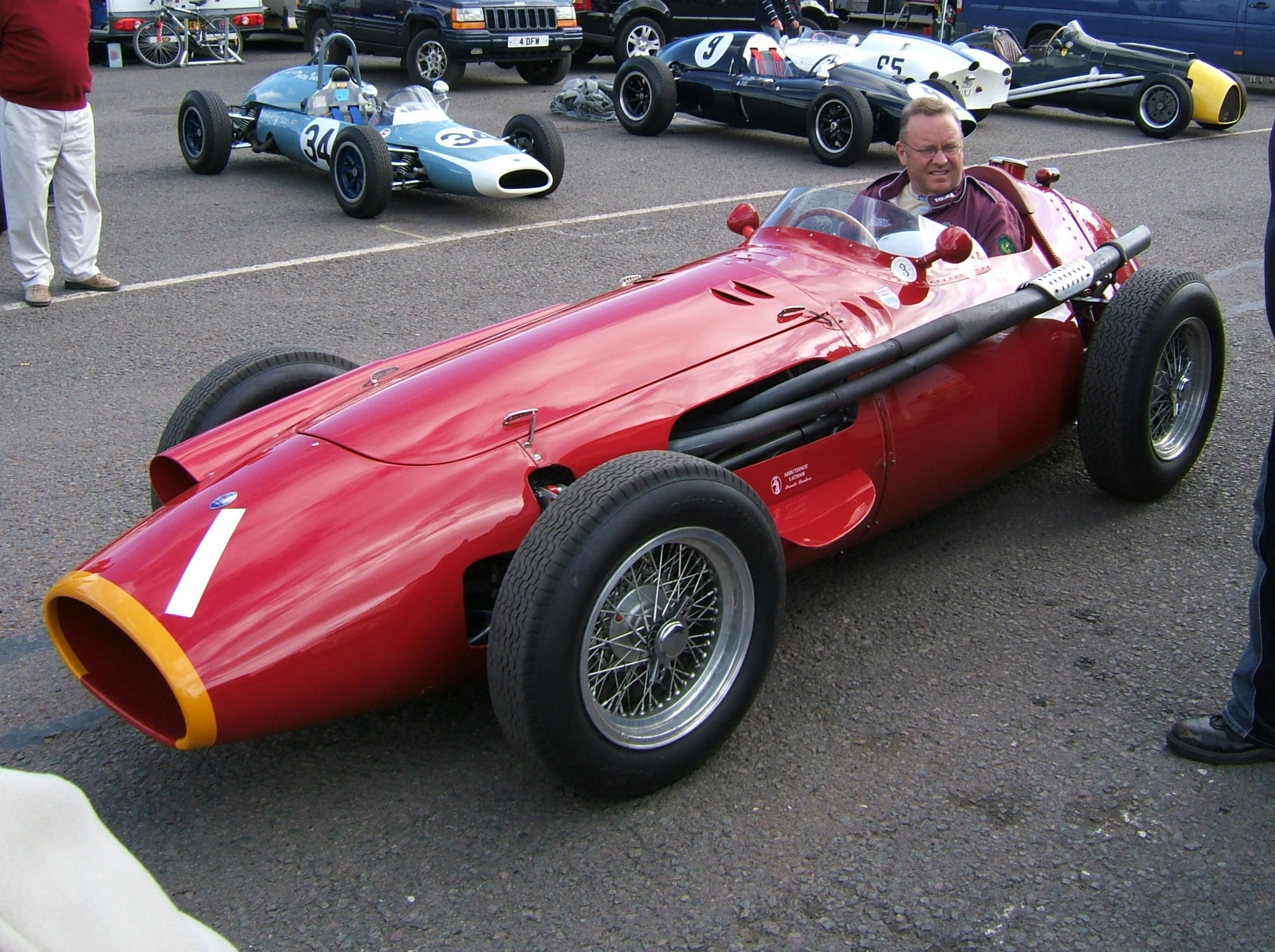
An example of a Maserati 250F as was used in Formula One. The 250F was unable to handle the Monza banking when equipped with larger Firestone tyres.

Although several American teams ran laps on Tuesday, official practice did not begin until Wednesday. All drivers were required to meet speed requirements to qualify: three laps at 185 km/h (115 mph), three laps at 200 km/h (120 mph), and another three laps at 225 km/h (140 mph). All drivers in attendance passed, and began to set their cars for top speed. Eddie Sachs led the first day's practice with a lap time of 56.4 seconds, one of few drivers to lap under a minute. On Thursday, Maserati arrived to enter Jean Behra in the event, but the two cars which Behra practiced with suffered handling problems when they were fitted with larger diameter Firestone tyres, recording a best lap time of 1:03.2 in the team's Formula One car. Maserati chose to not return the following day, joining the already withdrawn Ferrari, and leaving the race without any Formula One machinery.

Qualification was held on Friday, and the USAC teams continued to lower their lap times. Tony Bettenhausen, in the Novi Special, took pole position with a lap time of 53.7 seconds, averaging a speed of 284.927 km/h (177.045 mph), over 50 km/h faster than the pole speed at that year's Indianapolis 500. Eight other USAC cars also qualified, with Paul Russo in the other Novi Special suffering a terminal flywheel failure during its qualification attempt and withdrawing. The three Ecurie Ecosse Jaguars also qualified, but all slower than the USAC entries, due in part to being limited to their Dunlop road racing tyres, which were smaller than the Firestones. The best Ecurie Ecosse time was earned by Jack Fairman, lapping in 59.8 seconds.

=== Race ===
==== Heat one ====
The first heat started on Sunday, with temperatures at the circuit reaching 40 °C (104 °F). Bettenhausen slowly led the field to the starting line where an official waved the Italian flag to begin the race. The trio of Jaguars, although starting at the back, managed to jump to an early lead due to their use of a four-speed gearbox, allowing them to out-accelerate the USAC roadsters with two-speed gearboxes. Fairman led the first of 63 laps before the roadsters were able to build enough speed to catch and eventually pass the Jaguars. Bettenhausen returned to the front of the field, but was forced to relinquish the lead during the fourth lap with a broken throttle linkage. Pat O'Connor and Jimmy Bryan moved to the front and traded off the lead for half of the heat.

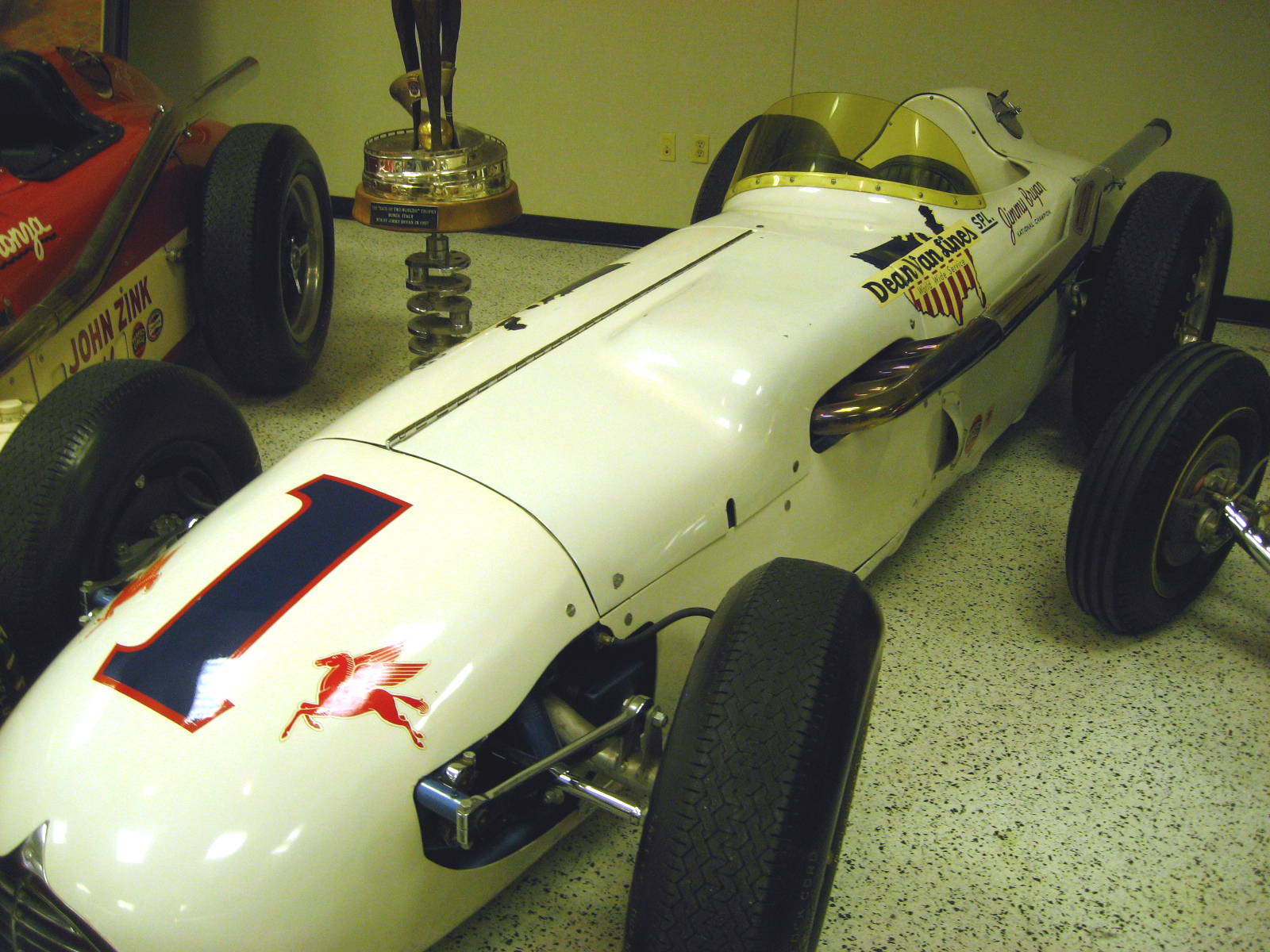
Jimmy Bryan's Kuzma–Offenhauser, known as the Dean Van Lines Special

Bryan eventually took command of the lead, pulling away from O'Connor and followers Eddie Sachs and Andy Linden. By the end of the 63 laps, Bryan was leading O'Connor by three seconds, with Linden the only other driver finishing on the lead lap. Bettenhausen, having rejoined the race after repairing the throttle linkage, was the only retirement after a sway bar broke on Lap 45. The USAC entries dominated, earning the first seven positions. Only Bob Veith's Phillips-Offy was unable to finish ahead of the trio of Jaguars.

Heat One Results
Pos.	No.	Driver	Chassis-Engine	Laps	Notes
1	1	(United States) Jimmy Bryan	Kuzma–Offy	63	
2	12	(United States) Pat O'Connor	Kurtis Kraft–Offy	63	
3	73	(United States) Andy Linden	Kurtis Kraft–Offy	63	
4	35	(United States) Eddie Sachs	Kurtis Kraft–Offy	62	
5	52	(United States) Troy Ruttman	Watson–Offy	61	
6	98	(United States) Johnnie Parsons	Kuzma–Offy	59	
7	49	(United States) Ray Crawford	Kurtis Kraft–Offy	58	
8	4	(United Kingdom) Jack Fairman	Jaguar	58	
9	2	(United Kingdom) John Lawrence	Jaguar	57	
10	6	(United Kingdom) Ninian Sanderson	Jaguar	53	
11	7	(United States) Bob Veith	Phillips–Offy	51	
DNF	27	(United States) Tony Bettenhausen	Kurtis Kraft–Novi	45	Broken sway bar

==== Heat two ====
Following an hour of repairs, the field began a rolling start for the second heat. In preparation for the Jaguar's ability to accelerate at the start, the lead USAC entries attempted to block the front stretch by running alongside one another. Troy Ruttman took the early lead, followed closely by O'Connor, Sachs, Bryan, and the Jaguar of Fairman. O'Connor soon retired with a broken fuel tank, followed several laps later by Sachs with broken cam house bolts. Ruttman was eventually caught and passed by Bryan, and the two finished in first and second at the end of the 63 laps. Only seven cars were still running at the end of the race, including the three Jaguars running in fifth, sixth, and seventh places.

Heat Two Results
Pos.	No.	Driver	Chassis-Engine	Laps	Notes
1	1	(United States) Jimmy Bryan	Kuzma–Offy	63	
2	52	(United States) Troy Ruttman	Watson–Offy	63	
3	98	(United States) Johnnie Parsons	Kuzma–Offy	61	
4	49	(United States) Ray Crawford	Kurtis Kraft–Offy	59	
5	4	(United Kingdom) Jack Fairman	Jaguar	59	
6	2	(United Kingdom) John Lawrence	Jaguar	57	
7	6	(United Kingdom) Ninian Sanderson	Jaguar	53	
DNF	35	(United States) Eddie Sachs	Kurtis Kraft–Offy	45	Broken cam house bolts
DNF	73	(United States) Andy Linden	Kurtis Kraft–Offy	27	Cracked frame
DNF	12	(United States) Pat O'Connor	Kurtis Kraft–Offy	16	Split fuel tank
DNF	7	(United States) Bob Veith	Phillips–Offy	1	Steering problems

==== Heat three ====
Another hour for repairs allowed for O'Connor to repair his fuel tank, bringing the entry to eight cars for the final heat. Only seven managed to begin the rolling start, as Ray Crawford remained in his pits to finish repairs. Bryan and Ruttman took the early lead once again as O'Connor was once again forced to retire, his repairs to the fuel tank not holding up to the bumps of the Monza banking. Jack Fairman's Jaguar managed to lead Johnnie Parsons' Kuzma-Offy early, but eventually the three remaining USAC cars led the three Jaguars to the finish line. Ruttman finished ahead of Bryan, while Fairman once more led the Jaguar trio.

Heat Three Results
Pos.	No.	Driver	Chassis-Engine	Laps	Notes
1	52	(United States) Troy Ruttman	Watson–Offy	63	
2	1	(United States) Jimmy Bryan	Kuzma–Offy	63	
3	98	(United States) Johnnie Parsons	Kuzma–Offy	62	
4	4	(United Kingdom) Jack Fairman	Jaguar	60	
5	2	(United Kingdom) John Lawrence	Jaguar	57	
6	6	(United Kingdom) Ninian Sanderson	Jaguar	55	
DNF	12	(United States) Pat O'Connor	Kurtis Kraft–Offy	9	Split fuel tank
DNF	49	(United States) Ray Crawford	Kurtis Kraft–Offy	1	Retired

==== Final result ====
With two heat wins, and being the only driver to complete all 189 laps, Jimmy Bryan was declared the winner in front of a crowd of 20,000. For his victory, he won US$35,000 in prize money, as well as a unique trophy created for the event. Bryan averaged 257 km/h (160 mph) over the full race distance, making it the fastest race in history, while Tony Bettenhausen also earned a world record by recording a lap speed of 284.561 km/h (176.818 mph) breaking a closed circuit speed record.

== 1958 ==
Following a successful running of the first Race of Two Worlds, the Automobile Club of Italy and USAC announced a second running in 1958, to be held on Sunday, June 29. Several Formula One teams, impressed by the speeds achieved by the USAC teams but also enticed by the large prize sum, promised to attend the event. Ferrari, initially reluctant, entered their own team after the Automobile Club of Italy announced that the Race of Two Worlds was a required event for teams vying for club's cash award for most successful Italian constructor.

Once again, USAC teams were transported from New York City on ships shortly after the Indianapolis 500. Alfa Romeo provided trucks for transport of the teams once they arrived in Genoa.

=== Entrants ===
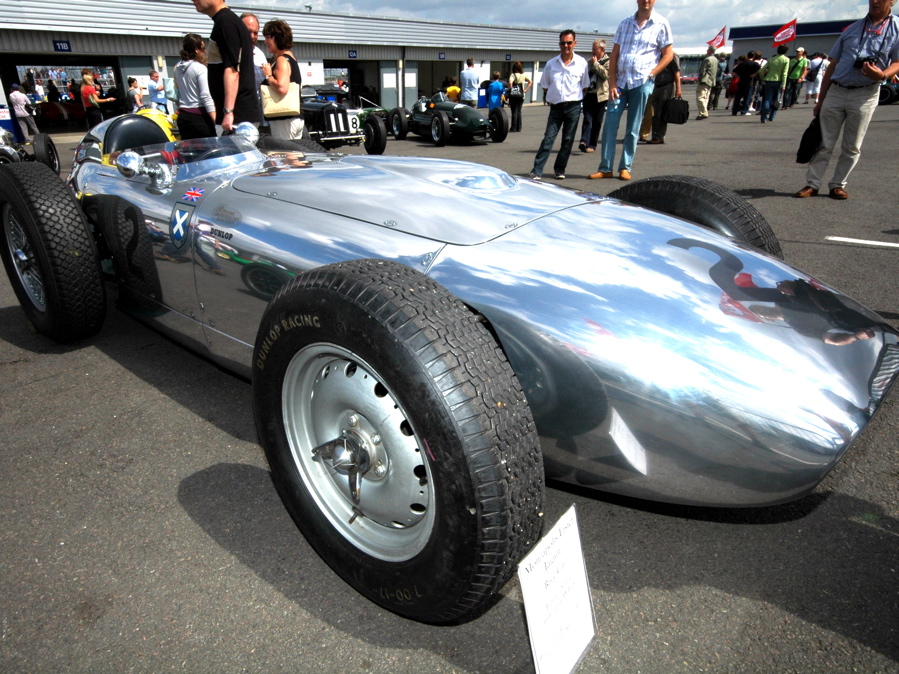
The unique Lister–Jaguar entered by Ecurie Ecosse

Once again, ten drivers and cars traveled from the United States to represent USAC. A further two USAC cars were also in attendance, to be driven by Formula One drivers Juan Manuel Fangio and Maurice Trintignant, but set up and run by the American crews. Ferrari, as part of their requirement with the Automobile Club of Italia, brought two unique cars. The first was an older 375 F1 chassis using a modified 4,023 cubic centimetres (245.5 cu in) V12 engine from 335 S sports car, and renamed the 412 MI. The second was a modified 246 featuring a Ferrari-built Dino V6 engine, enlarged to 3,210 cubic centimetres (196 cu in) and equally renamed the 326 MI. Luigi Chinetti's new North American Racing Team also entered a third Ferrari in the event, using an older V12 car which had originally attempted to qualify for the 1952 Indianapolis 500. Ferrari also chose to use the Firestone tires which USAC teams used, rather than the Englebert tires the company had a contract with.

Maserati also built a custom car, their only entry in the event. Based on the design of USAC's cars, the car (designated the 420M/58) featured an alcohol-fueled V8 engine which was placed off-center to counteract centripetal force of running on an oval. Learning from their problems the previous year, the car was specifically designed to use the larger Firestone tyres. A two-speed gearbox was also used. The Italian Eldorado Ice Cream Company helped fund the effort and so the entire car was painted white with their logo written across the side.

Jaguar also had a custom-built car entered, thanks to Lister Cars. A Lister sports car chassis was purchased by the team, modified into a single-seater body style, and fitted with a Jaguar Straight-6 engine from the D-Type. The bodywork was aluminium, and remained unpainted for the event, giving it a near mirror finish. Dunlop tyres remained on the front, but the rear was adapted to handle the larger Firestone tyres. The team also entered two standard Jaguar D-Types as they had done the previous year, although these were also altered to adapt to Monza's oval. Air scoops were added to the rear fenders in an attempt to help keep the cars' Dunlop tyres from overheating.

Number	Driver	Entrant	Chassis	Engine	Tyre
1	(United States) Jimmy Bryan	Belond AP	Salih	Offenhauser	F
2	(United Kingdom) Jack Fairman	Ecurie Ecosse	Lister^{3}	Jaguar	D F
4	(United States) Masten Gregory	Ecurie Ecosse	Jaguar D-Type	Jaguar	D
5	(United States) Jim Rathmann	Zink Leader Card	Watson	Offenhauser	F
6	(United Kingdom) Ivor Bueb	Ecurie Ecosse	Jaguar D-Type	Jaguar	D
8	(United States) Rodger Ward	Wolcott Fuel Injection	Lesovsky	Offenhauser	F
9	(United States) Bob Veith	Bowes Seal Fast	Kurtis Kraft 500G	Offenhauser	F
10	(United Kingdom) Stirling Moss	Eldorado Italia	Maserati 420M/58	Maserati	F
12	(Italy) Luigi Musso	Scuderia Ferrari	Ferrari 412 MI	Ferrari	F
12	(United States) Phil Hill^{5}	Scuderia Ferrari	Ferrari 412 MI	Ferrari	F
14	(United Kingdom) Mike Hawthorn^{4}	Scuderia Ferrari	Ferrari 326 MI	Dino	F
14	(Italy) Luigi Musso^{4}	Scuderia Ferrari	Ferrari 326 MI	Dino	F
14	(United States) Phil Hill^{4}	Scuderia Ferrari	Ferrari 326 MI	Dino	F
16	(United States) Harry Schell	North American Racing Team	Ferrari 375 Indianapolis	Ferrari	F
24	(United States) Jimmy Reece	Hoyt Machine	Kurtis Kraft 500C	Offenhauser	F
26	(United States) Don Freeland	Bob Estes	Phillips	Offenhauser	F
29	(Argentina) Juan Manuel Fangio	Dean Van Lines	Kuzma	Offenhauser	F
35	(United States) Eddie Sachs	Jim Robbins	Kurtis Kraft 500G	Offenhauser	F
49	(United States) Ray Crawford	Meguiar's Mirror Glaze	Kurtis Kraft 500G	Offenhauser	F
55	(France) Maurice Trintignant	Sclavi & Amos	Kuzma	Offenhauser	F
55	(United States) A. J. Foyt^{6}	Sclavi & Amos	Kuzma	Offenhauser	F
75	(United States) Johnny Thomson	D-A Lubricants	Kuzma	Offenhauser	F
98	(United States) Troy Ruttman	Agajanian	Kuzma	Offenhauser	F

Key
Colour	Car Type
Gray	USAC
Red	Modified Formula One
Blue	Sportscar
Green	Custom-built

=== Practice and qualifying ===
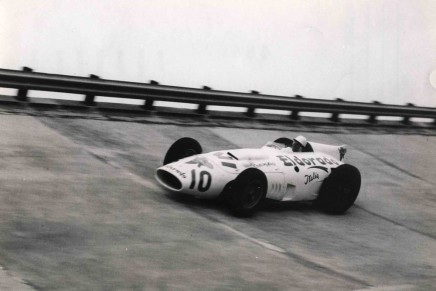
Stirling Moss in a Maserati 420M/58 during the race

Juan Manuel Fangio started practice early by setting one of the first laps around the circuit on Wednesday in a USAC entry loaned to him. Jim Rathmann set the fastest lap of the day with a time of 54.4 seconds, or 280 km/h (170 mph). Monza was drenched by rain on Thursday when official practice began, but Fangio chose to use the circuit anyway and set a lap speed over 233 km/h (145 mph), while the American teams chose to not run.

Qualifying began on a dry track late on Friday, with Fangio once again setting early laps, and increasing his pace to record a 55.2 second lap. Luigi Musso recorded the fastest time for the European entries, with a 55.3 second lap in a 412 MI. Qualifying continued again on Saturday, with the Americans quickly jumping to the top of the time charts. Bob Veith recorded a 54.0 second lap at a speed of 283 km/h (176 mph), however qualifying was determined by an average of three laps. Musso was able to improve on his previous day's performance in the Ferrari and recorded an average speed of 280.8 km/h (174.5 mph) to earn pole position. Veith qualified second, and Fangio ended the day third. Stirling Moss' Maserati qualified eleventh, while Phil Hill's Ferrari was fourteenth. Masten Gregory led the Jaguar trio in sixteenth with the older D-Type.

=== Race ===
==== Heat one ====
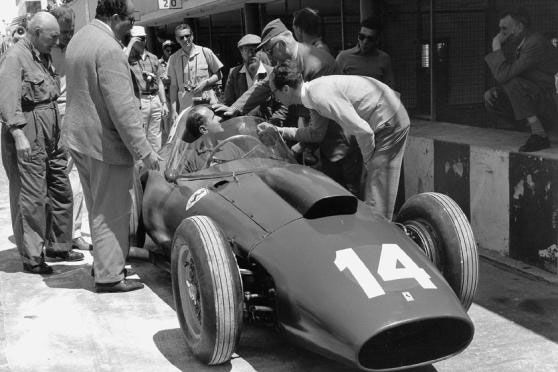
Phil Hill in Ferrari 326 MI #14

Sunday was race day, once again running as three 63-lap heats. Problems occurred early for Fangio as he was forced to withdraw from the first heat after his team discovered that his Offenhauser engine had a cracked piston. The other eighteen cars took the rolling start and, as in the year before, the Jaguars' gearing allowed them to jump to the early lead before Ferrari's Musso and several USAC drivers reclaimed it before the end of the first lap of the race. Eddie Sachs and Musso traded off the lead over the next several laps before Sachs remained in the lead, Jimmy Bryan also slipping into second. Rathmann worked his way through the field and took the lead from Sachs on Lap 11. Sachs was forced to drop from second place a few laps later when he broke a connecting rod, giving second to Musso. Musso however also dropped back after being overcome by methanol fumes, pitting on Lap 27 and handing the car to Mike Hawthorn. Rathmann continued to lead until the finish, followed by Bryan, Veith, and the Moss Maserati in fourth. Musso, who returned to his Ferrari on the final lap, brought the car home in sixth, three laps behind.

Heat One Results
Pos.	No.	Driver	Chassis-Engine	Laps	Notes
1	5	(United States) Jim Rathmann	Watson–Offy	63	
2	1	(United States) Jimmy Bryan	Salih-Offy	63	
3	9	(United States) Bob Veith	Kurtis Kraft–Offy	62	
4	10	(United Kingdom) Stirling Moss	Maserati	62	
5	75	(United States) Johnny Thomson	Kuzma–Offy	61	
6	12	(Italy) Luigi Musso	Ferrari	60	Hawthorn relieved Musso from Laps 27 to 60
6	12	(United Kingdom) Mike Hawthorn	Ferrari	60	Hawthorn relieved Musso from Laps 27 to 60
7	98	(United States) Troy Ruttman	Kuzma–Offy	60	
8	24	(United States) Jimmy Reece	Kurtis Kraft–Offy	59	
9	55	(France) Maurice Trintignant	Kuzma–Offy	59	
10	49	(United States) Ray Crawford	Kurtis Kraft–Offy	58	
11	2	(United Kingdom) Jack Fairman	Lister–Jaguar	57	
12	16	(United States) Harry Schell	Ferrari	56	
13	4	(United States) Masten Gregory	Jaguar	55	
14	6	(United Kingdom) Ivor Bueb	Jaguar	45	
DNF	35	(United States) Eddie Sachs	Kurtis Kraft–Offy	20	Broken connecting rod
DNF	26	(United States) Don Freeland	Phillips–Offy	16	Broken cam gear
DNF	8	(United States) Rodger Ward	Lesovsky–Offy	16	Broken torsion bar
DNF	14	(United States) Phil Hill	Ferrari–Dino	11	Broken magneto

==== Heat two ====
Heat two began with 13 of the 14 cars which had completed the first heat, Masten Gregory chose to not return with the Jaguar, but Rodger Ward was able to repair his car and compete. Fangio planned to race, but his team had not completed engine repairs by the end of the hour and a half break. Maurice Trintignant, who had completed the first heat in the Sclavi & Amos Kuzma-Offenhauser, chose to be relieved by rookie A. J. Foyt for the rest of the race. Rathmann led the field to the start and remained in the lead throughout. Musso once again remained with the top drivers, but pitted after only nineteen laps to be replaced, this time by Phil Hill whose Ferrari had retired in the first heat. Moss, Veith, Bryan, and Troy Ruttman all fought for second place, eventually led to the finish by Veith, nearly 20 seconds behind winner Rathmann. Moss' Maserati suffered engine trouble and dropped back at the finish, earning fifth.

Heat Two Results
Pos.	No.	Driver	Chassis-Engine	Laps	Notes
1	5	(United States) Jim Rathmann	Watson–Offy	63	
2	9	(United States) Bob Veith	Kurtis Kraft–Offy	63	
3	1	(United States) Jimmy Bryan	Salih-Offy	63	
4	98	(United States) Troy Ruttman	Kuzma–Offy	63	
5	10	(United Kingdom) Stirling Moss	Maserati	62	
6	55	(United States) A. J. Foyt	Kuzma–Offy	61	
7	24	(United States) Jimmy Reece	Kurtis Kraft–Offy	60	
8	49	(United States) Ray Crawford	Kurtis Kraft–Offy	60	
9	12	(Italy) Luigi Musso	Ferrari	60	Hill relieved Musso from Laps 20 to 60
9	12	(United States) Phil Hill	Ferrari	60	Hill relieved Musso from Laps 20 to 60
10	2	(United Kingdom) Jack Fairman	Lister–Jaguar	57	
11	6	(United Kingdom) Ivor Bueb	Jaguar	51	
DNF	8	(United States) Rodger Ward	Lesovsky–Offy	31	Retired
DNF	16	(United States) Harry Schell	Ferrari	15	Retired
DNF	75	(United States) Johnny Thomson	Kuzma–Offy	4	Broken crankshaft

==== Heat three ====
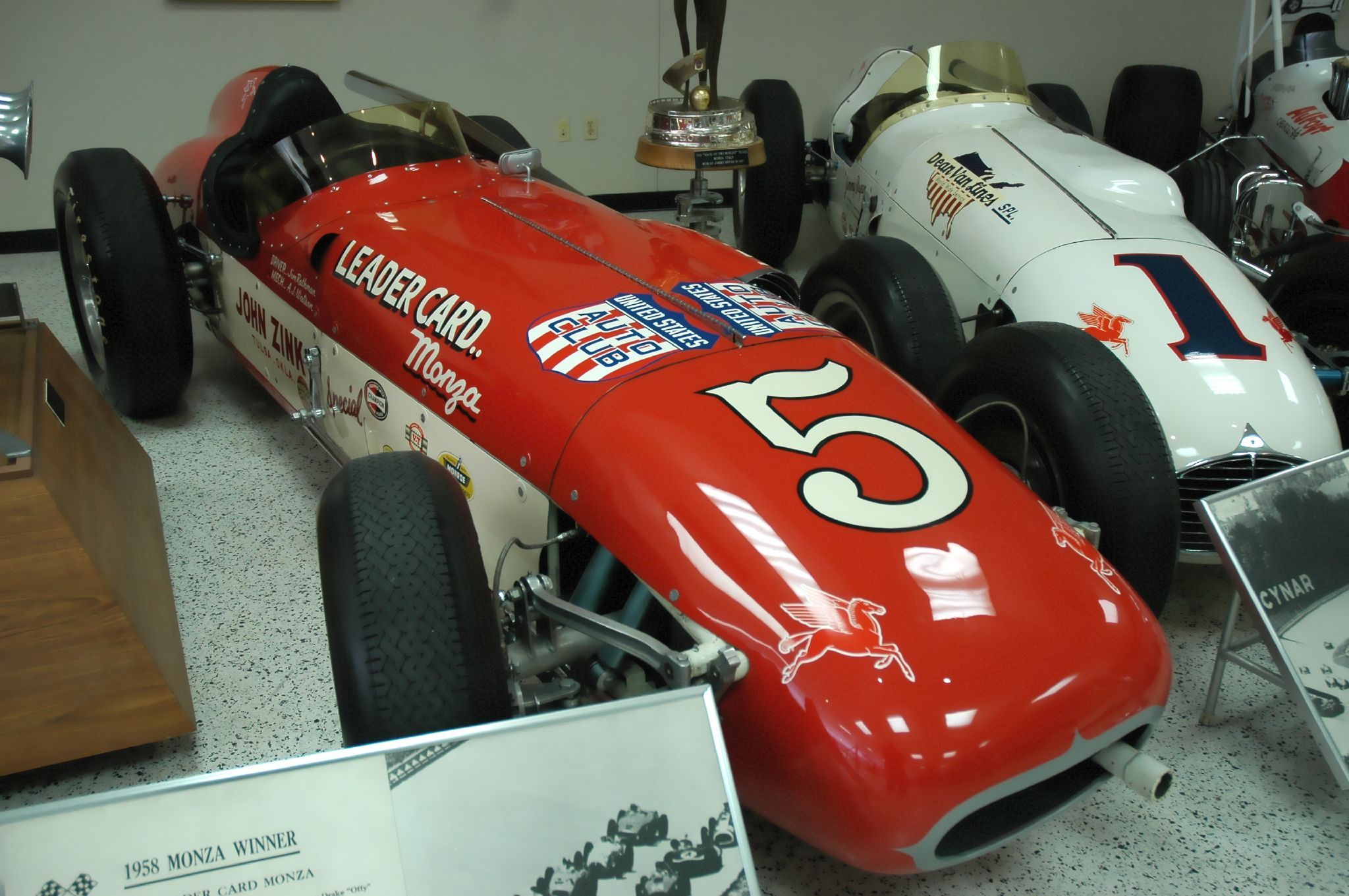
The Zink Leader Card Monza Special, Jim Rathmann's race winning Watson–Offenhauser

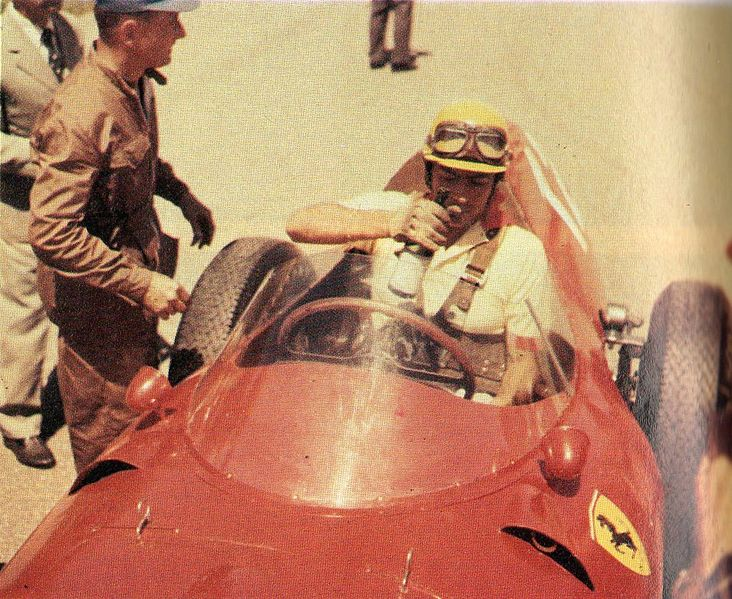
Ferrari 412 MI finished third overall

Eleven cars were entered for the final heat, joined by Fangio and Gregory who had both repaired their cars. Fairman chose not to continue in the Lister-Jaguar, while Hawthorn started the #12 Ferrari in place of Musso. Rathmann once again led at the start, followed by Bryan and Foyt. Fangio's car lasted only two laps before his fuel pump failed and he was forced to retire. Hawthorn suffered the same methanol inhalation problems as Musso and relinquished his car to Phil Hill after 24 laps. Moss, after bringing his Maserati up to fourth place, suffered steering failure on Lap 41, crashing into the guard rails at the top of the banking. Rathmann led straight to the finish, ahead of Bryan. Hill brought the Ferrari up to third before giving the car back to Hawthorn, who finished the race in third.

Heat Three Results
Pos.	No.	Driver	Chassis-Engine	Laps	Notes
1	5	(United States) Jim Rathmann	Watson–Offy	63	
2	1	(United States) Jimmy Bryan	Salih-Offy	63	
3	12	(United Kingdom) Mike Hawthorn	Ferrari	60	Hill relieved Hawthorn from Laps 25 to 60
3	12	(United States) Phil Hill	Ferrari	60	Hill relieved Hawthorn from Laps 25 to 60
4	49	(United States) Ray Crawford	Kurtis Kraft–Offy	60	
5	24	(United States) Jimmy Reece	Kurtis Kraft–Offy	59	
DNF	55	(United States) A. J. Foyt	Kuzma–Offy	54	Broken crankshaft
7	6	(United Kingdom) Ivor Bueb	Jaguar	52	
DNF	4	(United States) Masten Gregory	Jaguar	44	Retired
DNF	10	(United Kingdom) Stirling Moss	Maserati	40	Accident
DNF	9	(United States) Bob Veith	Kurtis Kraft–Offy	28	Lost a wheel
DNF	98	(United States) Troy Ruttman	Kuzma–Offy	12	Broken fuel line
DNF	29	(Argentina) Juan Manuel Fangio	Kuzma–Offy	2	Broken fuel pump

==== Final result ====
Jim Rathmann, winning all three heats, was declared the race winner, although Jimmy Bryan had finished only a minute and a half behind Rathmann on aggregate time. Rathmann averaged a speed of 268.367 km/h (166.756 mph) over the 500 miles. Several thousand more spectators attending the 1958 running of the event than had attended the previous year.

== Cancellation ==
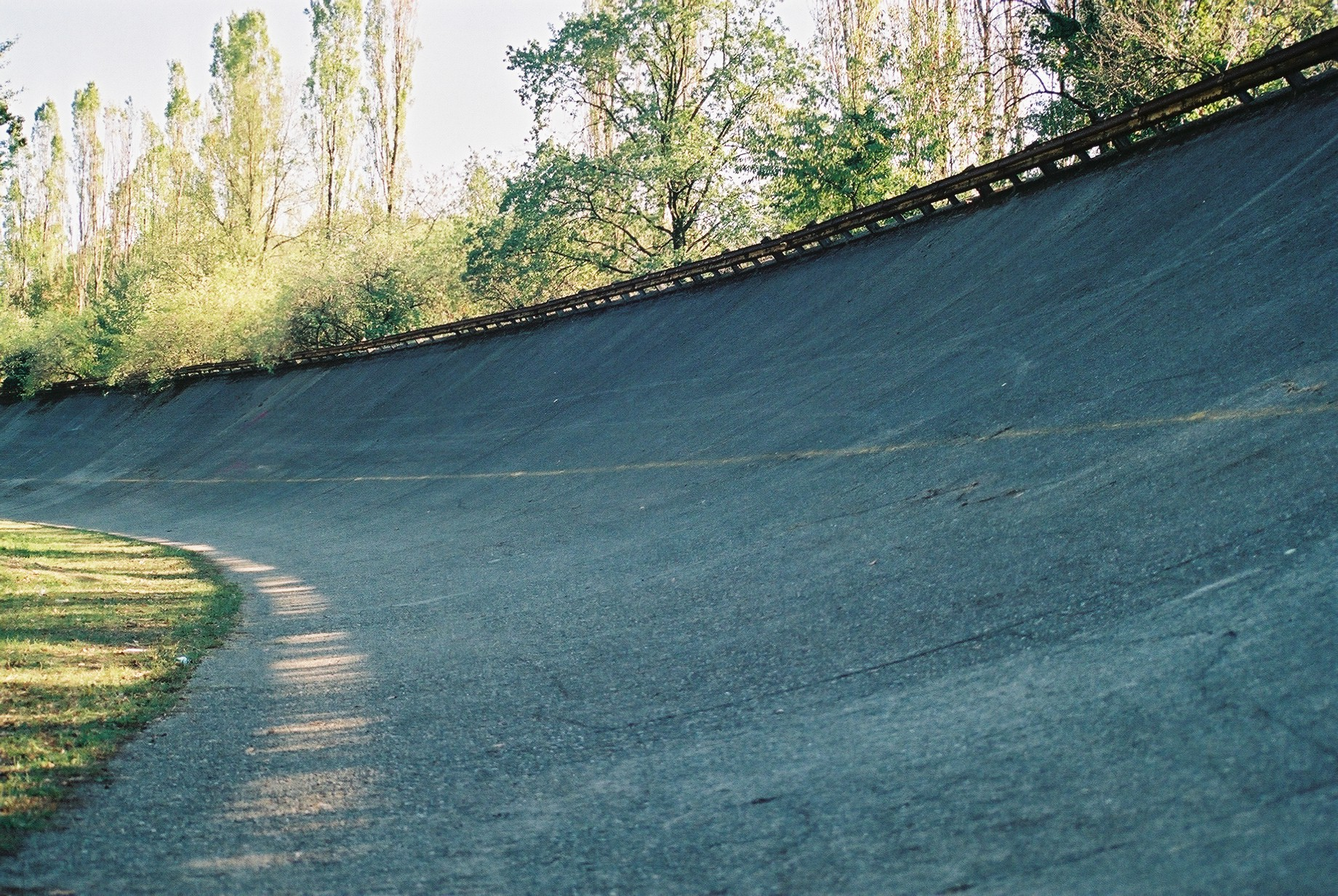
The decaying banking of the Monza oval

Although the Race of Two Worlds attracted several European teams over its two years, the Automobile Club of Milan was unable to make a profit on the event. Unable to agree on funding a third running, the Club did not organize a Race of Two Worlds for 1959 and the event never returned. The banked oval at Monza remained part of the full Formula One circuit until 1961, and ceased to be used for any motorsports activities in 1969. It has since been abandoned and left to decay, and at times threatened with demolition.
