= Ferrari 326 MI =

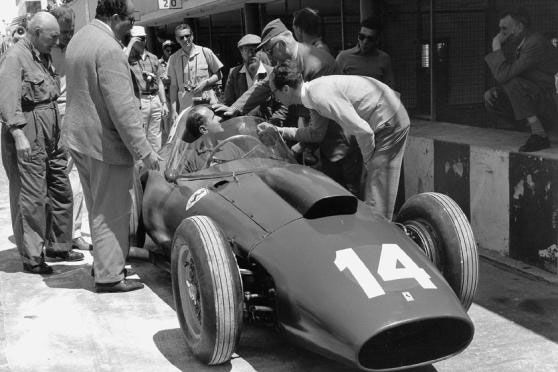
- Constructor: Ferrari
- Designer(s): Carlo Chiti; Vittorio Jano

Technical specifications
- Chassis: Tubular steel spaceframe
- Suspension (front): independent double wishbones, coil springs, hydraulic shock absorbers, anti-roll bar
- Suspension (rear): De Dion axle, twin radius arms, coil springs, telescopic shock absorbers
- Axle track: F: 1,240 mm (48.8 in); R: 1,240 mm (48.8 in)
- Wheelbase: 2,220 mm (87.4 in)
- Engine: Dino 3,210.12 cc (195.9 cu in) 65° V6 naturally-aspirated front-engine, longitudinally mounted
- Transmission: 3-speed manual transmission
- Tyres: F: 6.00 x 16; R: 8.00 x 16; Firestone

Competition history
- Notable entrants: Scuderia Ferrari
- Notable drivers: (United States) Phil Hill
- Debut: 1958 Race of Two Worlds
Entries	Races	Wins	Podiums
1	1	0	0

The Ferrari 326 MI (also known as the 296 MI) was a single-seater manufactured by Ferrari in 1958. It was a one-off race car purpose-built for the second edition of the 500 Miles of Monza. It was one of the two special cars created to compete with American race cars on an Italian race track. Following the naming convention, "326" stood for 3.2-litre, 6-cylinder engine. The "MI" suffix stood for "Monza-Indianapolis".

== Development ==
The Race of Two Worlds was a short-lived race where the European and American single seaters and sports cars could compete. At Autodromo Nazionale Monza, the organisers prepared special banked curves on a paved oval track in the Indianapolis 500 style. It was the fastest race at that time with a highest speed recorded at 284 km/h (176.5 mph), compared to a record of 235 km/h (146 mph) at the 1958 Indianapolis 500.

Ferrari entered three cars in this race to Indycar regulations. Two of them were specially engineered for the 500 Miles of Monza. The second purpose-built racer after the 412 MI used a modified 246 F1 chassis, featuring a Ferrari-built Dino V6 engine, enlarged to 3.2-litres and was named the 326 MI. The engine was derived from the Dino race car with the largest capacity possible by its crankshaft at 90 mm (3.5 in) of stroke. Ferrari also chose to use the Firestone tyres, just as Americans did. Ferrari was in contract with Belgian Englebert but those tyres were not suitable for a high speed Monza track.

== Specifications ==
=== Engine and transmission ===
The 326 MI used a Dino 65° V6 engine, mounted longitudinally in the front. The internal measurements were 87 by 90 mm (3.4 by 3.5 in) of bore and stroke and the resulting total capacity was 3,210.12 cc (3.2 L; 195.9 cu in). It was the biggest capacity and the longest stroke of any Dino V6 in history. With a compression ratio of 10:1, it could produce a maximum power of 330 PS (243 kW; 325 hp) at 7250 rpm. The engine was of a DOHC configuration with two valves per cylinder. Fuel feed was by three Weber 50DCN carburettors. The lubrication system was of a dry sump type. Racing transmission had only three forward speeds.

=== Chassis and suspension ===
The 326 MIs tubular steel chassis was derived from the contemporary Ferrari 246 F1 race car with necessary modifications. The front suspension was independent with double unequal-length wishbones, coil springs and hydraulic shock absorbers. At the rear there was a De Dion tube with twin radius arms and coil springs, aided by telescopic shock absorbers. Brakes were of a drum type and fuel tank had a capacity of 166 litres.

== Racing ==
For the 1958 edition of the Race of Two Worlds the Ferrari 326 MI #14 was initially assigned Luigi Musso as a driver. But because Musso had to relieve Mike Hawthorn in the 412 MI #12, Phil Hill was reassigned as a replacement for the 326 MI. Phil Hill's Ferrari was decidedly underpowered and could not match the leading cars. The 326 MI qualified at fourteenth place for the starting grid with a qualification average speed of 259.1 km/h (161 mph).

In the first heat of the actual race, after completing only eleven laps, Phil Hill had to retire due to ignition problems. The sole race of the 326 MI was cut short by a broken magneto. Phil Hill then served as a support for the other Ferrari team with the 412 MI, and in the two remaining heats relieved both drivers. That team finished the race at a third place overall.

The Race of Two Worlds was cancelled and not organised again for the 1959 season.

== See also ==
Other Race of Two Worlds race cars:

- Ferrari 412 MI
- Ferrari 375 Indianapolis
- Maserati 420M/58
- Jaguar D-Type
