= Ray Crawford (racing driver) =

American pilot, racing driver and businessman (1915–1996)

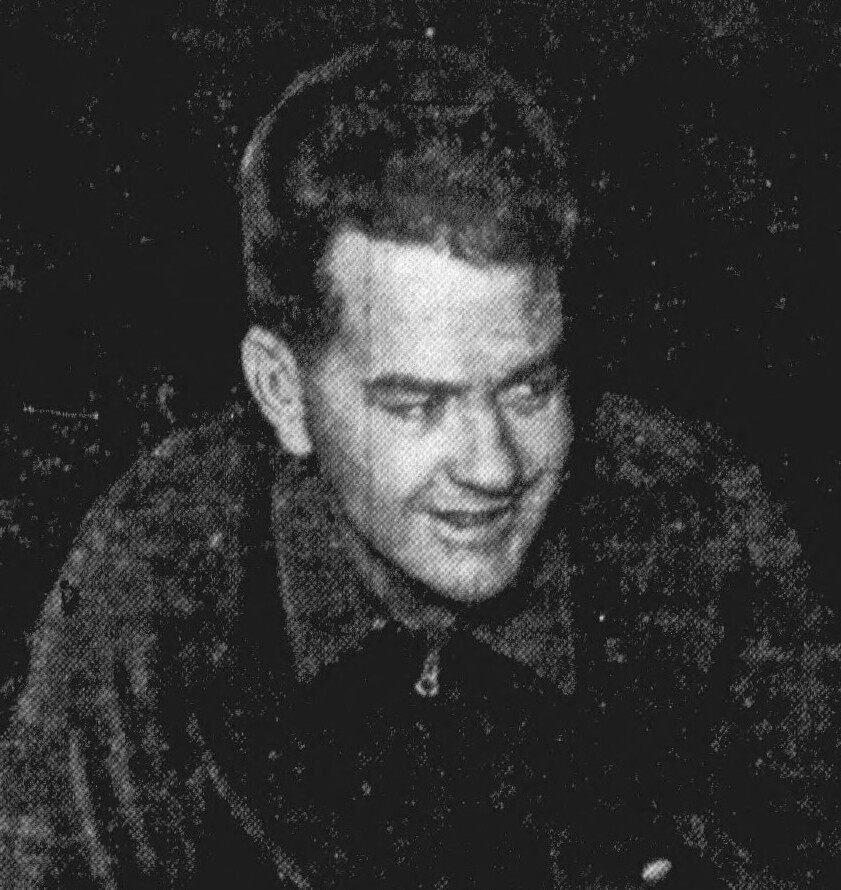
- Crawford, circa 1949
- Born: 26 October 1915; Roswell, New Mexico, U.S.
- Died: 1 February 1996 (aged 80); Los Angeles, California, U.S.

Formula One World Championship career
- Nationality: (United States) American
- Active years: 1955–1959
- Team(s): Elder, Kurtis Kraft
- Entries: 5 (3 starts)
- Championships: 0
- Wins: 0
- Podiums: 0
- Career points: 0
- Pole positions: 0
- Fastest laps: 0
- First entry: 1955 Indianapolis 500
- Last entry: 1959 Indianapolis 500

Ray Crawford (October 26, 1915 – February 1, 1996) was an American fighter ace, test pilot, race-car driver and businessman.

== Biography ==
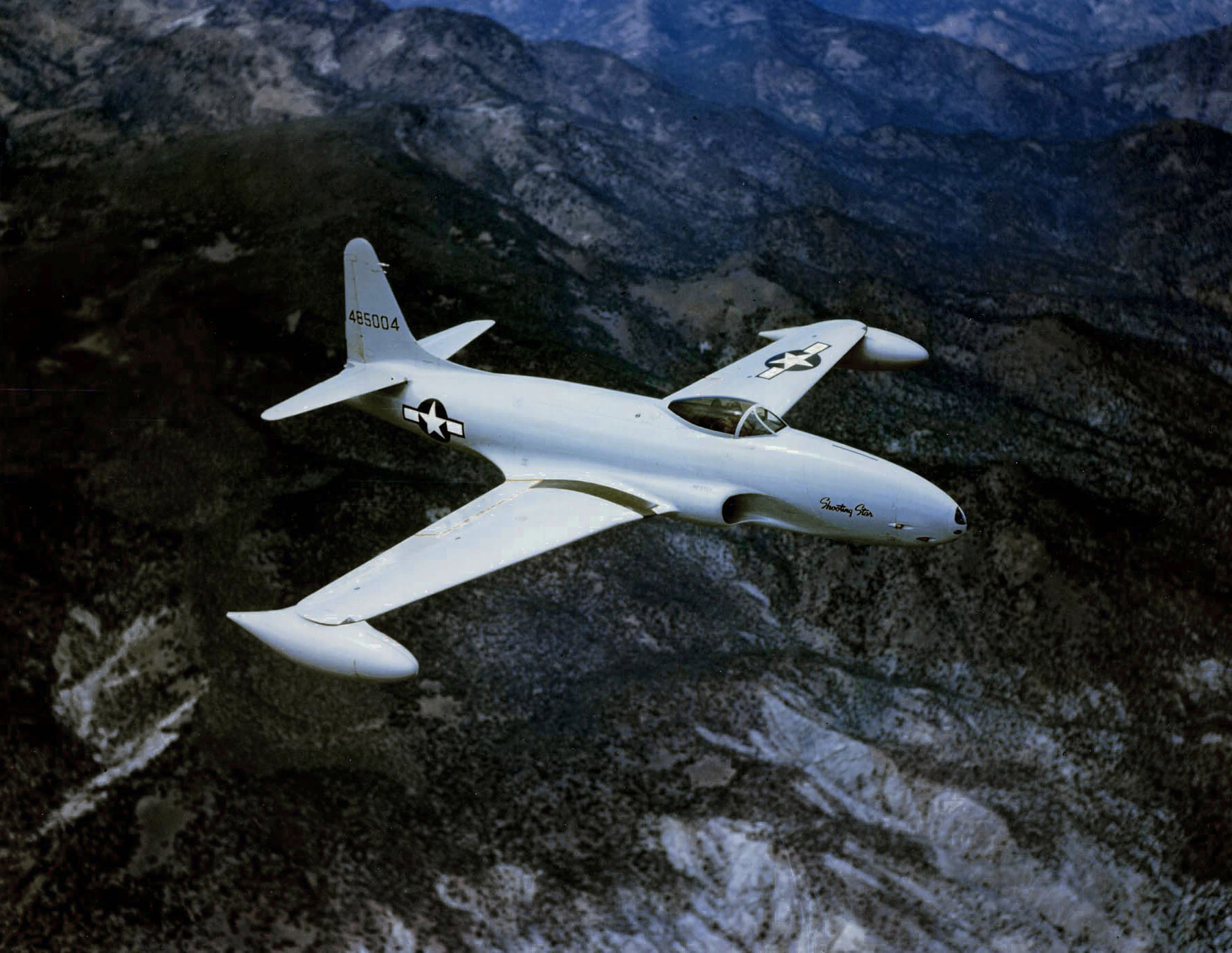
Crawford was one of the first pilots certified on the P-80 Shooting Star.

Born in Roswell, New Mexico, Crawford served as a U.S. Army Air Corps fighter pilot and flew the P-38 Lightning in combat over North Africa in 1943. He was tied as the top-ranking fighter ace of the 97th Fighter Squadron with six enemy aircraft confirmed destroyed and one probably destroyed. Rotated home, he eventually became an early jet pilot. At war's end Crawford was evaluating the Lockheed P-80 Shooting Star at Burbank, California and was to have flown the very aircraft that fighter ace Richard Bong was eventually killed in. He was awarded the Distinguished Flying Cross and the Air Medal with fourteen Oak Leaf Clusters before separating from active duty as a Captain in February, 1946. Crawford remained in the Air Force Reserves until April 1953.

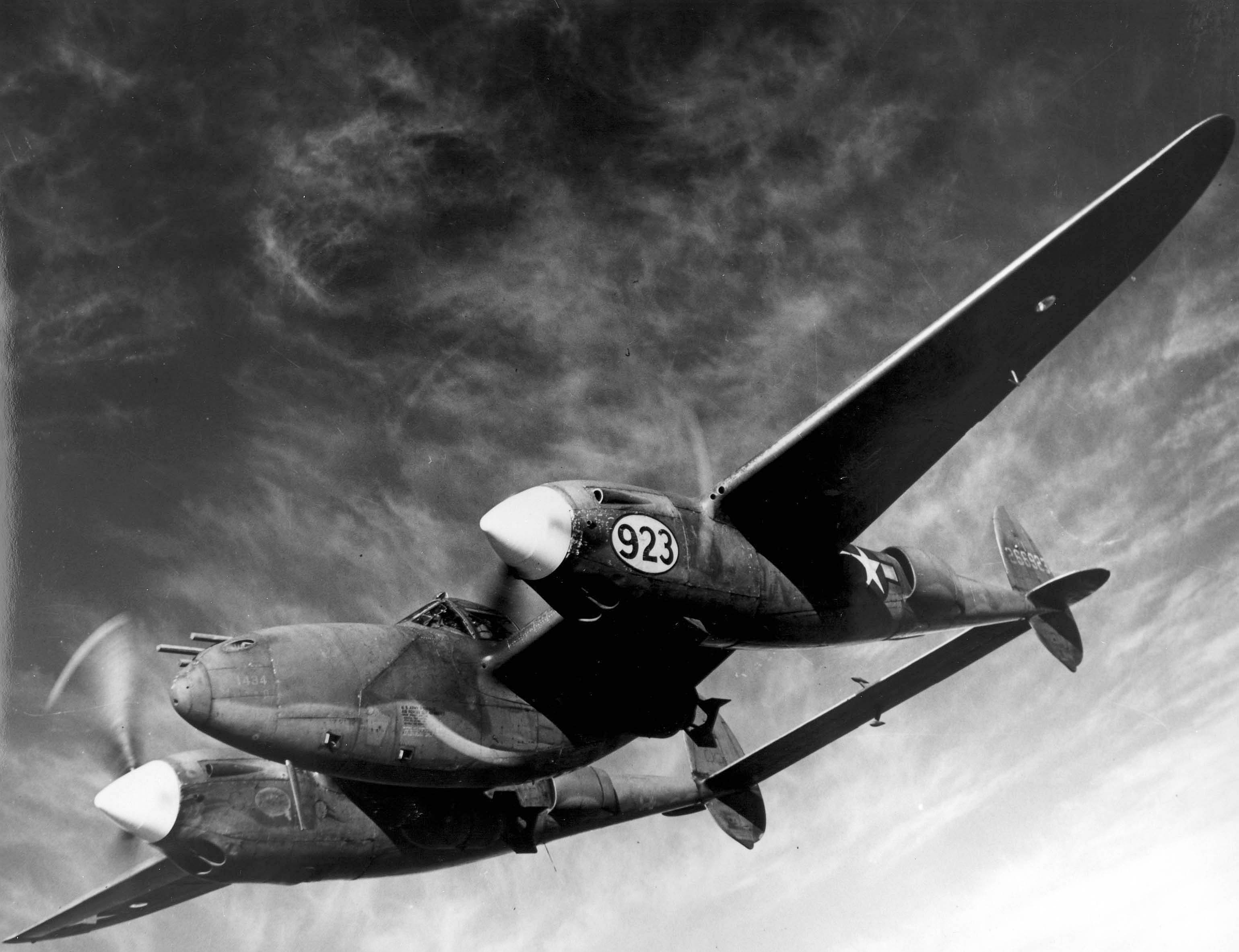
A P-38 Lightning, similar to Crawford's.

Crawford was introduced to racing by Sam Hanks, a former high school classmate, and competed notably with unlimited hydroplanes and automobiles. He drove in the AAA and USAC Championship Car series, racing in the 1954-59 seasons with 9 starts, including the Indianapolis 500 races in 1955-56, and 1959. In 1954, he won the stock-car class of the Carrera Panamericana (a nine-stage, five-day race across Mexico) in a Lincoln. He also finished 7th and 4th in the invitational "Race of Two Worlds" events held at Monza Autodrome, Italy in 1957 and 1958, respectively.

In 1955, Crawford drove a Lincoln-Kurtis sports car at the 12 Hours of Sebring and finished the race in thirteenth position after running the entire length without a co-driver. To date, he is the only driver to have completed the race without relief of any kind.

Crawford's family owned a successful supermarket chain based in El Monte, California which led to his nickname, "The Flying Grocer." Crawford was one of the first owner-drivers of the post-war era at the Indianapolis Motor Speedway and raced his own privately funded cars throughout his career. The only exception came in 1956, when Crawford raced the 12 Hours of Sebring for Chevrolet's inaugural Corvette team. He was also the driver of Corvette's experimental SR-2 at the Bahamas Speedweeks event that December. Cars owned by Crawford also qualified for the Indianapolis 500 with other drivers in 1953, 1954 and 1962.

Serious injuries received during a crash at the 1959 Indianapolis 500 curtailed Crawford's driving career.

Speed legend Mickey Thompson cites Crawford as an early influence in his autobiography, Challenger. Crawford provided Thompson with his first exposure to the Indianapolis 500 as a member of his pit crew.

Crawford died in Los Angeles, California on February 1, 1996 after battling Alzheimer's disease and is buried at Riverside National Cemetery in Riverside, California. He is the subject of a 2015 biography by Andrew Layton titled Ray Crawford - Speed Merchant. Dick Wallen, a noted auto racing photographer and publisher, also contributed to the book.

== World War II aerial victory credits ==
Date	Kills	Location/Comment
March 1, 1943	2	Messerschmitt Bf 109s; On bomber escort
March 22, 1943	1	Messerschmitt Bf 109 (Probably destroyed)
April 5, 1943	1	Messerschmitt Bf 109
April 11, 1943	2	Junkers Ju 52 Transports; Ace status
June 15, 1943	1	Macchi C.202

== Awards and decorations ==
Crawford's ribbons as they appeared upon separation from the armed forces in 1953.

From top, and from left to right:

- Row 1: Distinguished Flying Cross, Air Medal, with 14 oak leaf clusters,
- Row 2: Air Medal, continued, American Defense Service Medal, American Campaign Medal,
- Row 3: European-African-Middle Eastern Campaign Medal, World War II Victory Medal, National Defense Service Medal

== Indy 500 results ==
Year	Car	Start	Qual	Rank	Finish	Laps	Led	Retired
1955	49	23	139.206	20	23	111	0	Valve
1956	49	17	140.884	29	29	49	0	Crash T4
1959	49	32	141.348	32	23	115	0	Crash T3
Totals						275	0	

Starts	3
Poles	0
Front Row	0
Wins	0
Top 5	0
Top 10	0
Retired	3

== Complete Formula One World Championship results ==
(key)

Year	Entrant	Chassis	Engine	1	2	3	4	5	6	7	8	9	10	11	WDC	Points
1955	Ray Crawford	Kurtis Kraft 500B	Offenhauser L4	ARG	MON	500; 23	BEL	NED	GBR	ITA					NC	0
1956	Ray Crawford	Kurtis Kraft 500B	Offenhauser L4	ARG	MON	500; 29	BEL	FRA	GBR	GER	ITA				NC	0
1957	Meguiar's Mirror / Crawford	Kurtis Kraft 500G	Offenhauser L4	ARG	MON	500; DNQ	FRA	GBR	GER	PES	ITA				NC	0
1958	Meguiar's Mirror / Crawford	Kurtis Kraft 500G	Offenhauser L4	ARG	MON	NED	500; DNQ	BEL	FRA	GBR	GER	POR	ITA	MOR	NC	0
1959	Meguiar's Mirror / Crawford	Elder	Offenhauser L4	MON	500; 23	NED	FRA	GBR	GER	POR	ITA	USA			NC	0
