= Lister Motor Company =

British sports car manufacturer

Lister Motor Company Ltd
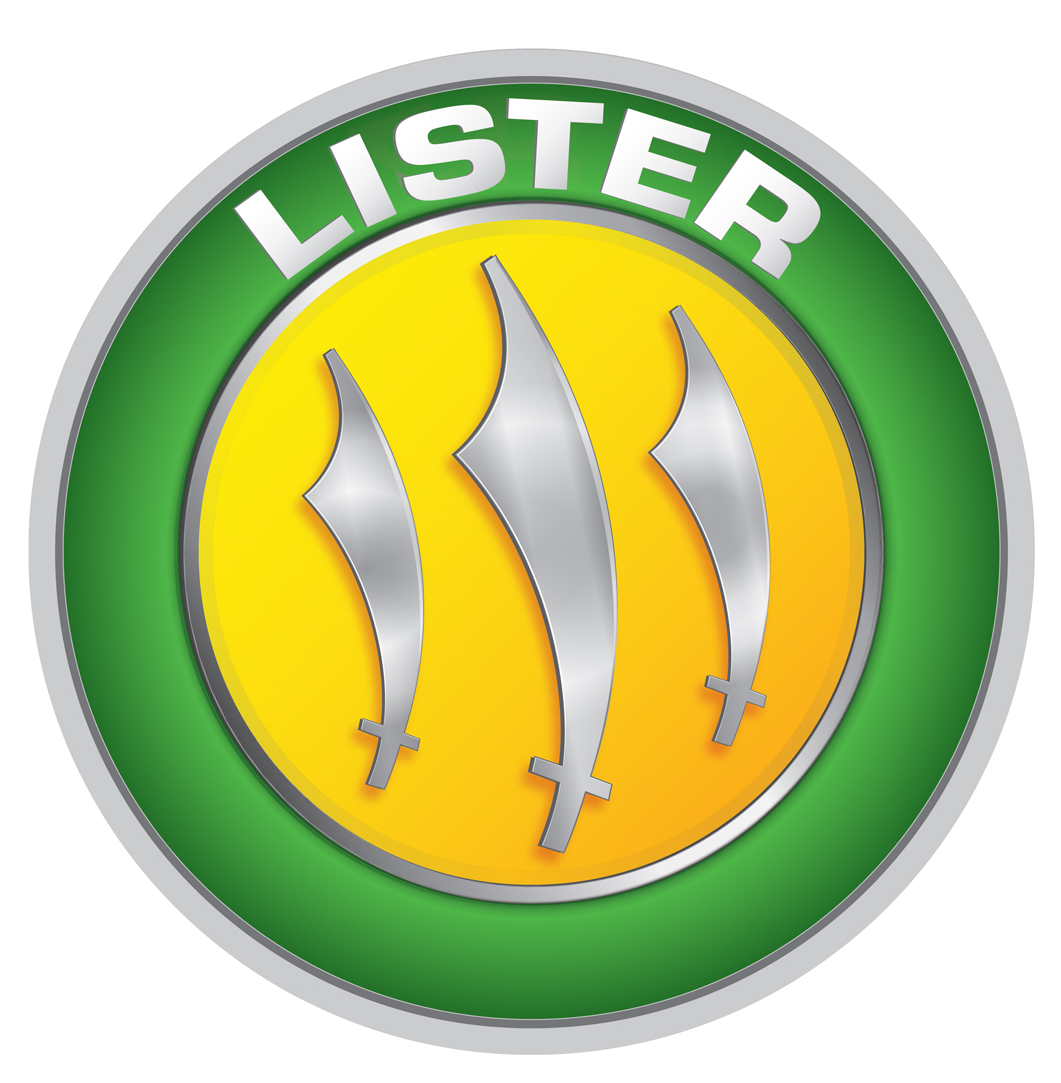
- Type: Private limited company
- Industry: Automotive
- Founded: July 30, 1954; 72 years ago (George Lister Engineering Limited); May 20, 2013; 13 years ago (Lister Motor Company Ltd)
- Founder: Brian Lister
- Headquarters: Cambridge, United Kingdom
- Key people: Andrew Whittaker (Chairman); Lawrence Whittaker (Managing Director)
- Products: sports cars
- Owners: George Lister Engineering Ltd (1954–1986); Laurence Pearce (1986–2013); Warrantywise (2013–present)
- Website: www.lister.com

Lister Motor Company Ltd is a British sports car manufacturer founded by Brian Lister in 1954 in Cambridge, England, which became known for its involvement in motorsport. After buying the company in 1986, Laurence Pearce produced variants of the Jaguar XJS before producing a bespoke sports car, the Lister Storm. In 2013, Lister Cars was acquired by Lawrence Whittaker's company Warrantywise. Production of the original sports car restarted in 2014 and ten continuation Lister Jaguar Knobblys were built to celebrate Lister's 60th Anniversary. In 2016, the company announced the build and sale of the Lister Knobbly Stirling Moss. On 31 January 2018, the Lister LFT-666 (previously called the Lister Thunder) based on the Jaguar F-Type was announced.

== History ==
=== George Lister and sons ===
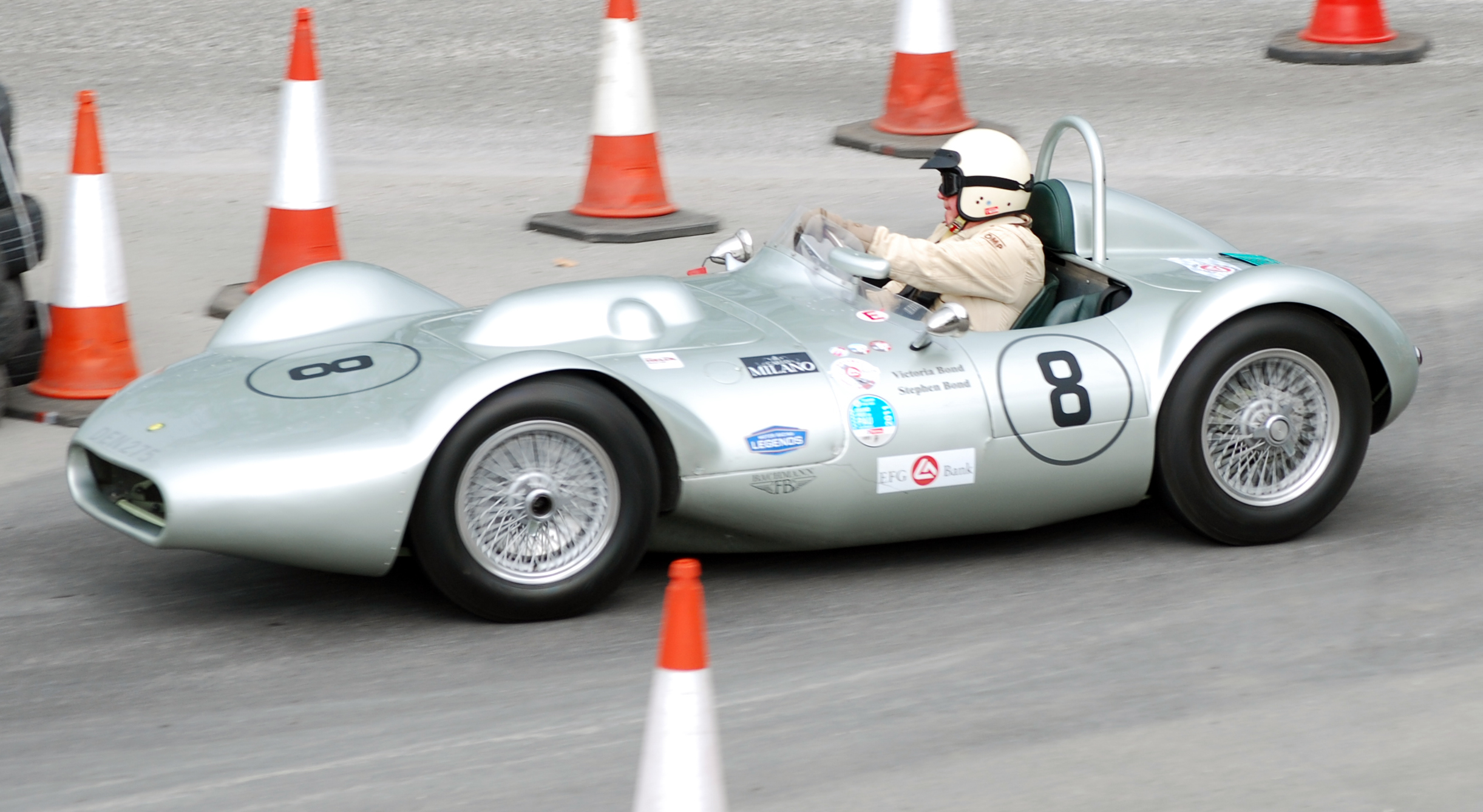
1955/57 Lister-Bristol (BHL9)

Beginning in 1954, company manager and racing driver Brian Lister brought out the first in a series of sports cars from a Cambridge iron works. Inspired by Cooper, he used a tubular ladder chassis, de Dion rear axle and inboard drum brakes. Like others, he used a tuned MG engine and stock gearbox. It made its debut at the British Empire Trophy at Oulton Park in 1954, with former MG driver Archie Scott Brown at the wheel. Later, Lister swapped in a Moore-tuned Bristol two-litre engine and knockoff wire wheels in place of the MG's discs to improve performance. For the sports car race supporting the 1954 British Grand Prix at Silverstone, Scott Brown won the two-litre class and placed fifth overall behind only works Aston Martins.

In 1955, a handful of Lister-Bristols were built with a new body built by an ex-Bristol employee with the aid of a wind tunnel. Despite its new fins and strakes, it was less successful than the original Lister-Bristol of 1954. Lister moved up to a six-cylinder motor from a Formula 2 Maserati A6GCS for their own car, while customers continued to receive the Bristol motor, sold for £3900. Lister also attempted single-seater racing with a multi-tube chassis powered by a Coventry-Climax motor and using an MG gearbox, but the car was a failure.

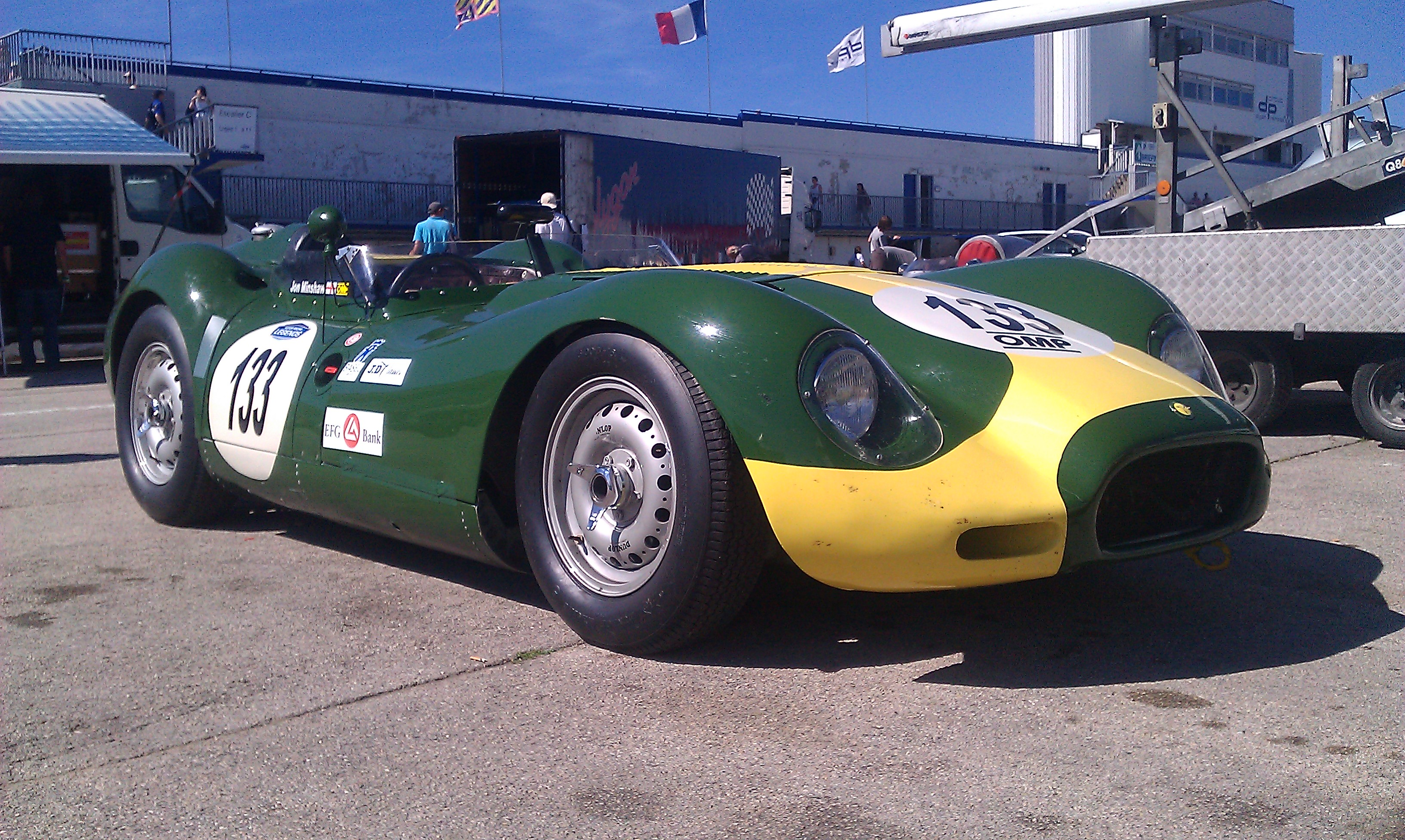
A Lister Jaguar powered by a 3.4 litre Jaguar D-type XK inline-six

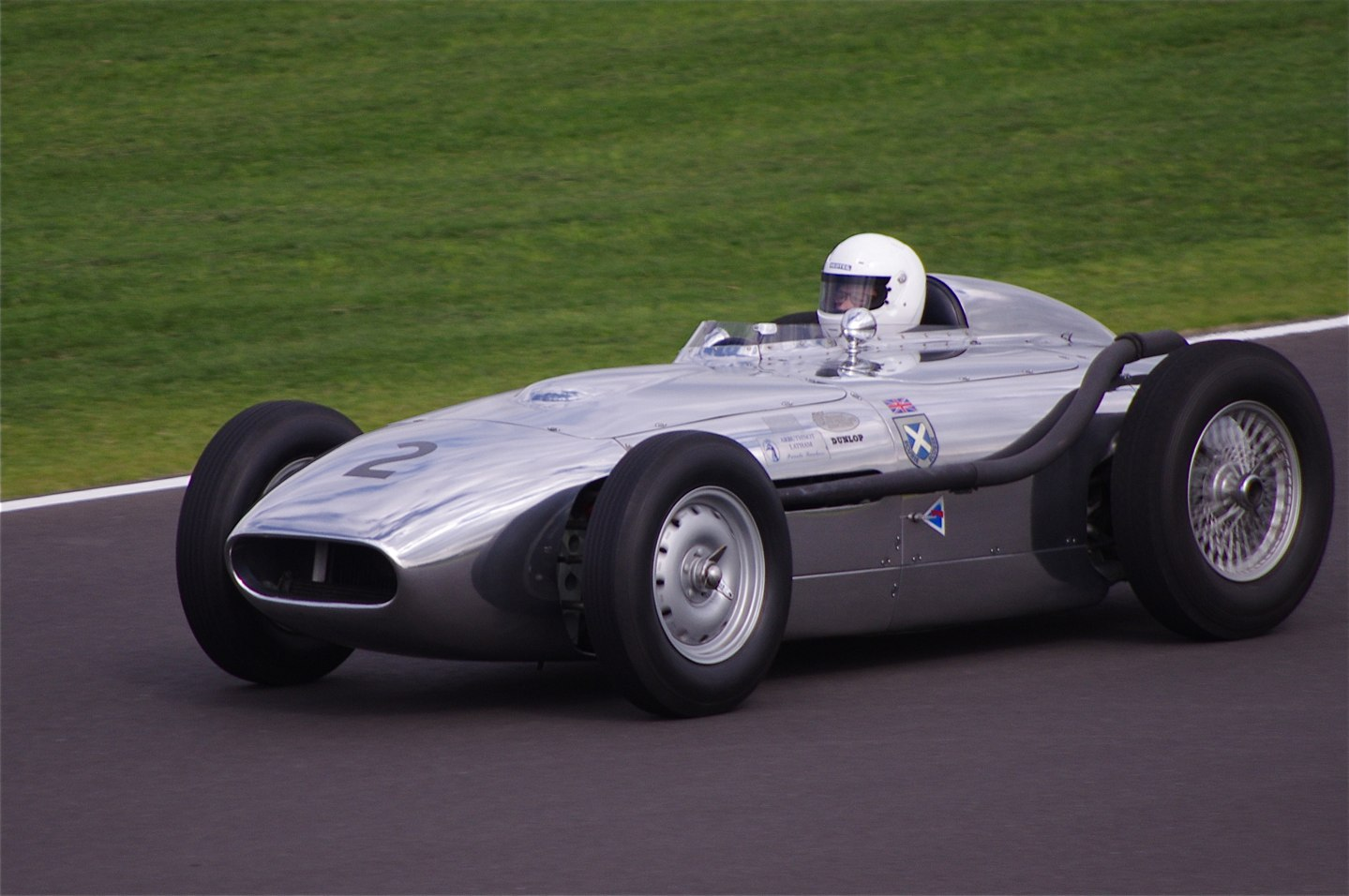
The unique Lister–Jaguar entered by Ecurie Ecosse

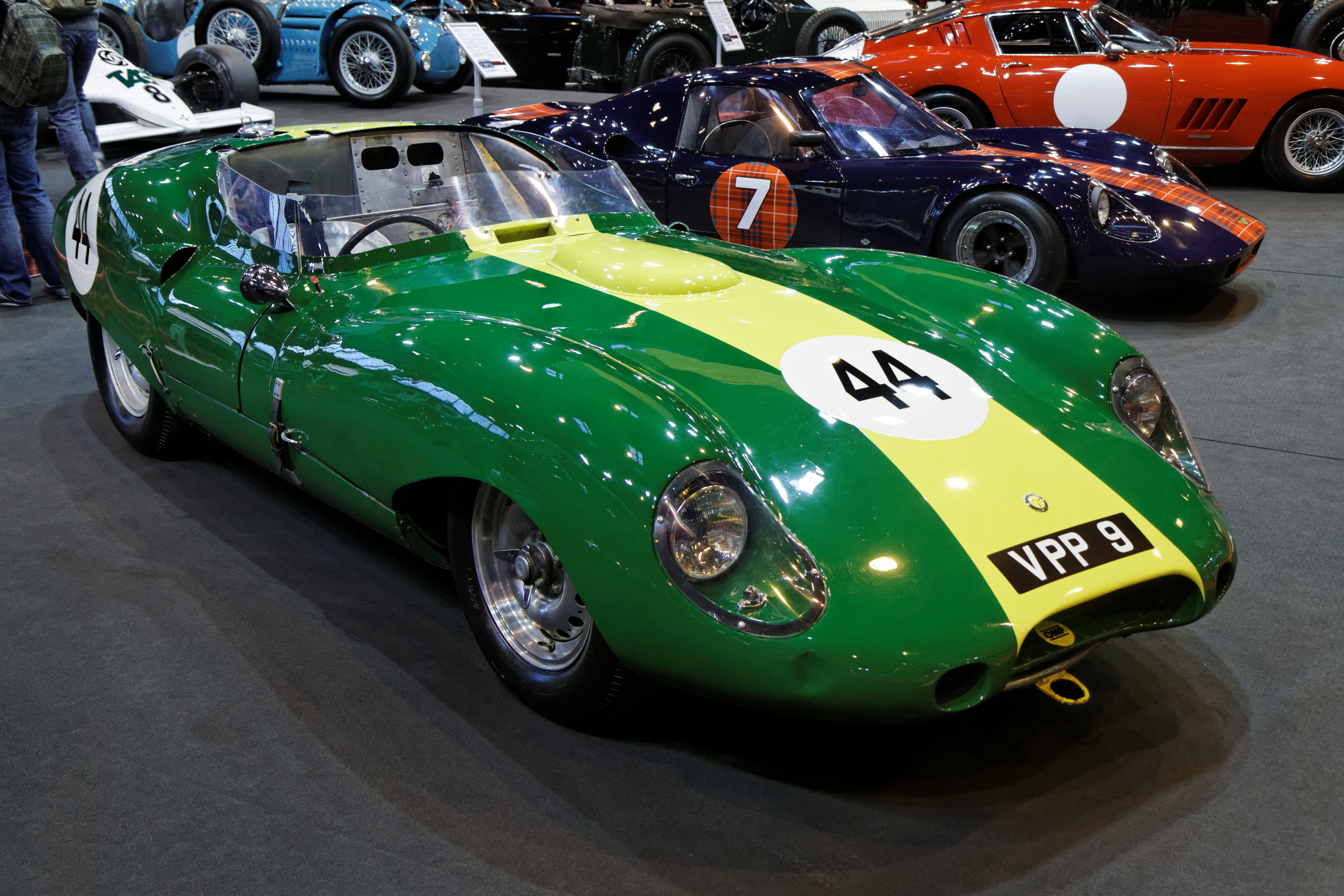
1959 Lister-Jaguar Costin

For 1957, Lister redesigned the car around a 3.4 litre Jaguar D-type XK inline-six, with an aerodynamic aluminium body. It was tested by racing journalist John Bolster, performing a 0–100 mph (0–160 km/h) run in 11.2 seconds. Driver Archie Scott Brown won the 1957 British Empire Trophy in the new Lister-Jaguar. Refined again in 1958, the Lister-Jaguar entered international competitions. Brown was killed that season when he crashed the Lister-Jaguar at Spa-Francorchamps. Lister also developed another single-seater car based on the Lister-Jaguar, for use in the unique Race of Two Worlds at Monza. Cars from this era are affectionately known as the "Lister Knobbly" cars, due to their curved bodywork.

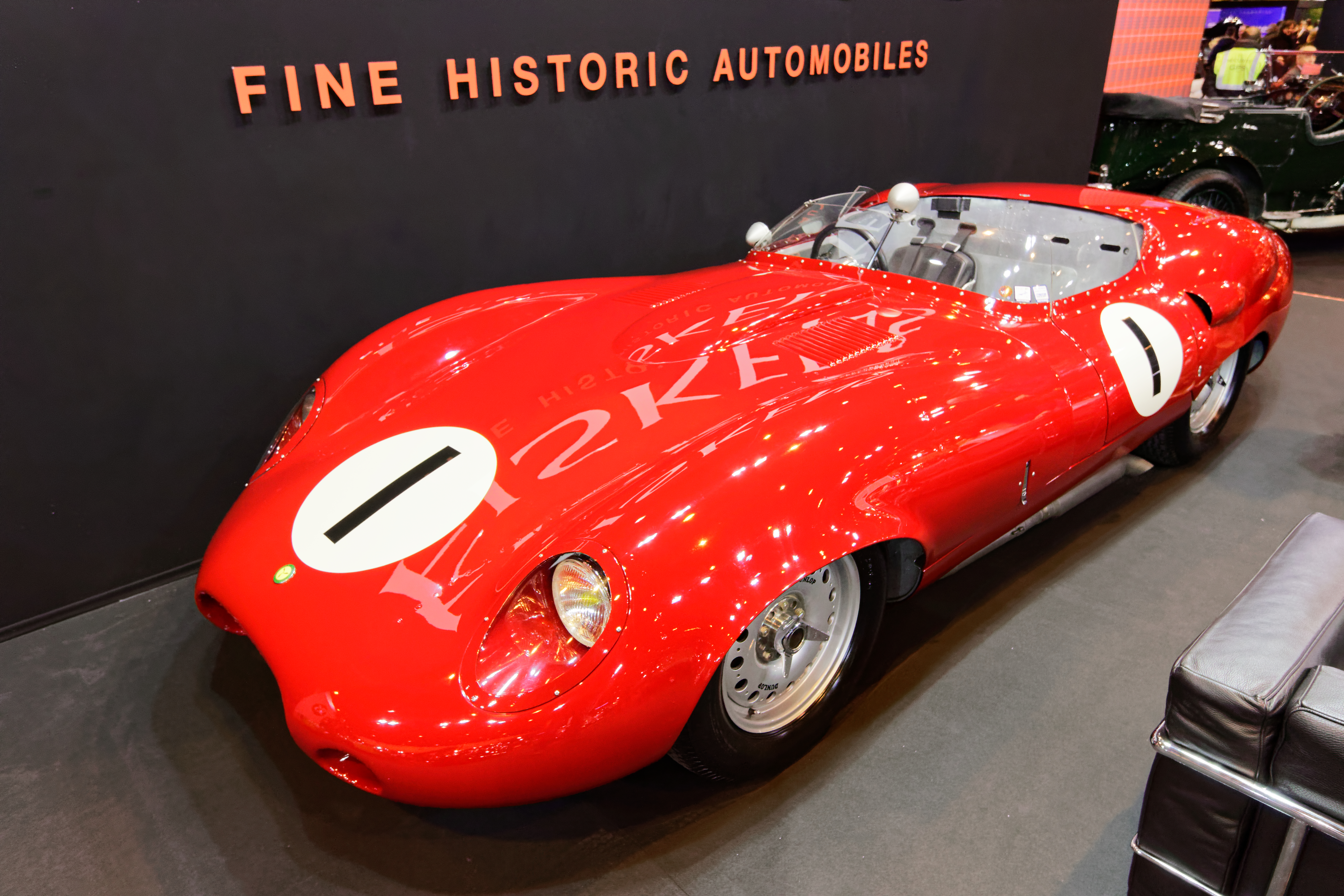
The Lister-Chevrolet, designed by Frank Costin

For 1959, Lister hired aerodynamicist Frank Costin who produced entirely new bodywork built around a new Chevrolet Corvette power plant. However, the front-engine layout of the new Lister-Chevrolet was quickly eclipsed by the rear-engine layout of the new Cooper sports car. By the end of 1959 Lister withdrew from competition although production of sports cars continued for customers.

In 1963, Brian Lister was chosen by the Rootes Group to prepare the Sunbeam Tiger for the prototype category of the 24 Hours of Le Mans. The Ford V8-powered Tiger was still in the early stages of development while Lister was constructing the chassis at the Jensen factory. Lister upgraded the suspension and brakes, added an aerodynamic fastback hardtop with a more sloping windscreen and a Kamm tail. The 260 cu in (4,300 cc) Ford V8 engine was tuned by Carroll Shelby in order to allow it to produce 275 hp (205 kW) instead of the 160 hp (120 kW) in standard specification. The car was designed with a top speed of 170 mph (270 km/h) in mind, but were developed in a short time frame and suffered engine failures. Rootes later received a refund for the engines. The two cars and one prototype mule still exist. The failure of the cars and Rootes' bankruptcy led to the demise of Lister's tuning work as well.

=== Pearce ownership ===
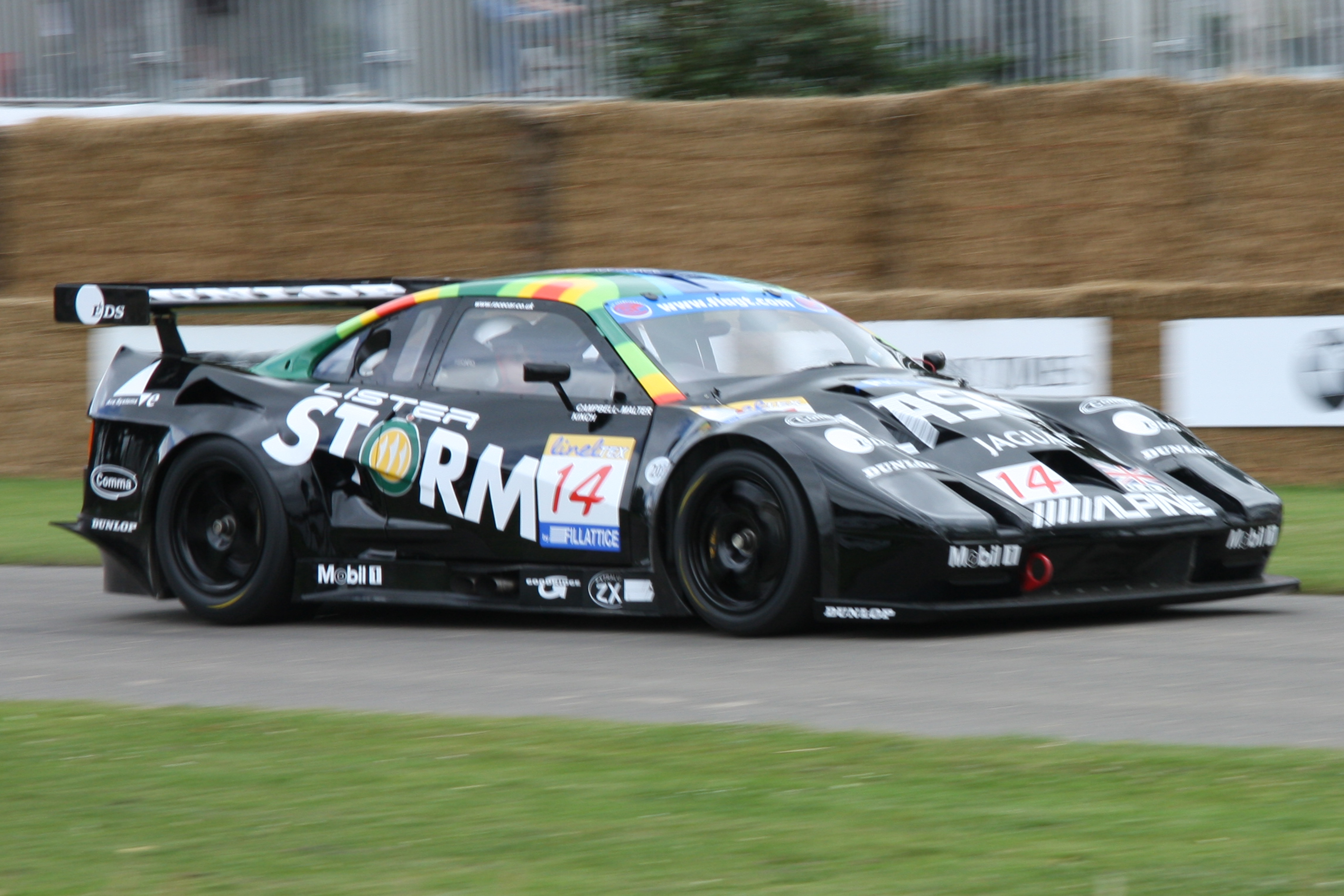
A Lister Storm race car

The Lister company returned in 1986 as Lister Cars Ltd. based in Leatherhead, Surrey, with engineer Laurence Pearce tuning approximately 90 Jaguar XJSs and improving their top speed to over 200 mph (322 km/h), with an asking price of over £100,000. Success at this endeavour led the newly formed company to design a new sports car, the Lister Storm. Launched in 1993, it would use the largest displacement V12 engine ever fitted to a production car at that time, a 7.0L unit derived from the Jaguar XJR9. The Storm was later developed for motorsport in various guises, winning the FIA GT Championship in 2000. Lister later developed a bespoke Le Mans Prototype, the Storm LMP in 2003.

== Whittaker ownership ==
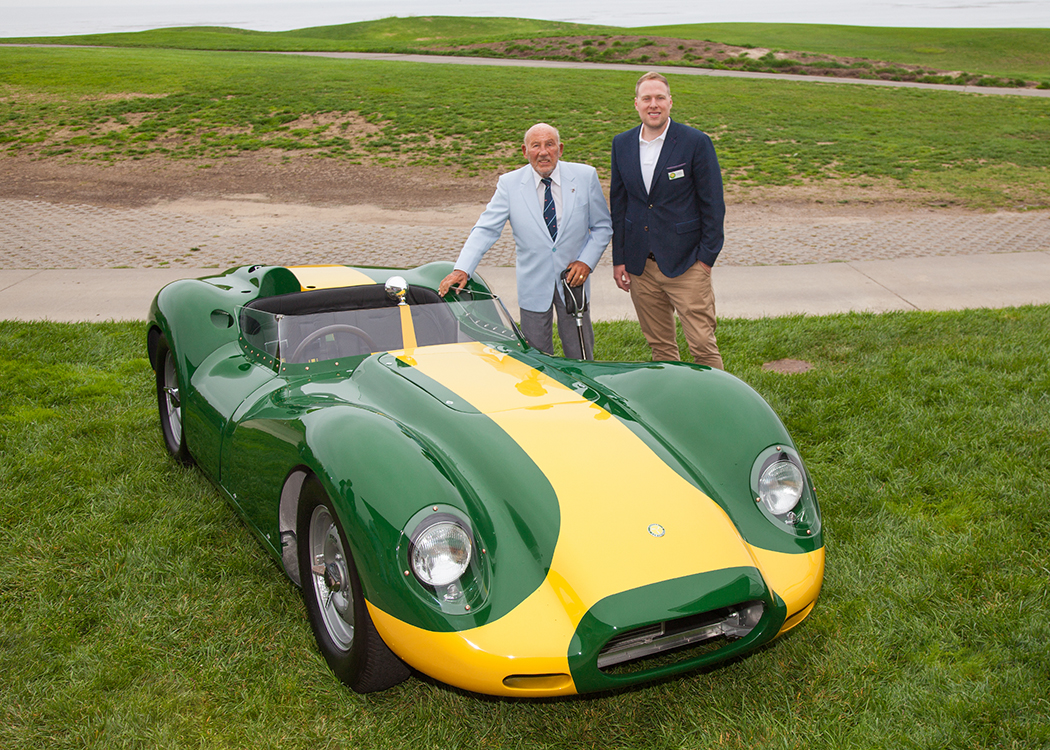
Lister CEO Lawrence Whittaker and Sir Stirling Moss with a Knobbly continuation car

In 2012, Lawrence Whittaker and his father visited the Lister factory to source parts when restoring a Lister Knobbly, and the opportunity to purchase the Lister Motor Company arose. In 2013, ownership of George Lister Engineering Limited of Cambridge, original intellectual property rights, the plans and drawings for all original Lister cars, as well as the property rights of Pearce's Lister Cars were bought by father and son Andrew and Lawrence Whittaker, who also own car warranty company Warrantywise. The new company, along with its associated partners, was rebranded as the Lister Motor Company Ltd. Ten months later, the Lister Motor Company announced the build and sale of the Lister Knobbly to mark 60 years since the first Lister Racing Car was built.

== Current Products ==
=== 60th Anniversary Lister Knobbly ===
The new company started building of the original Lister designs in 2014. To celebrate the 60th Anniversary of The Lister Motor Company, the release of the Lister Knobbly was announced, described as the most successful racing car of the late 1950s. The Lister Knobbly was driven by some of the most notable racing car drivers of the 50s including: Archie Scott Brown, Stirling Moss, Ivor Bueb, Bruce Halford and Innes Ireland amongst many others. Within a matter of weeks half of the 60th Anniversary Lister race cars were sold out. Soon after, the order book was completely full and Lister had orders for £5m.

=== Lister Knobbly Sir Stirling Moss Edition ===
In June 2016, The Lister Motor Company announced the build and sale of the Lister Knobbly Stirling Moss at the Royal Automobile Club in London. The car is built to the exact specification of the 1958 model and is the only magnesium-bodied car in the world and only the second car in history endorsed by legendary racing driver Sir Stirling Moss. Brian Lister invited Stirling Moss to drive for Lister on three separate occasions, at Goodwood in 1954, Silverstone in 1958 and at Sebring in 1959, and to celebrate these races, 10 special edition lightweight Lister Knobbly cars are being built and priced at £1 Million each. The company announced that the cars will be available for both road and race use and Sir Stirling Moss will personally be handing over each car.

=== Lister LFT-666 ===
In January 2018, Lister announced the LFT-666. The car, which is a modified Jaguar F-Type R has a modified variant of the 5.0-litre supercharged V8 engine as utilised in the Jaguar F-Type SVR, generating 666 bhp (497 kW) at 6,000 rpm and a peak torque of 976 N⋅m (720 lb⋅ft) achieved by dual modified supercharger pulleys, a modified intercooler, an improved air intake system and a different ECU. The car is capable of accelerating from 0–100 km/h (0–62 mph) in 3.2 seconds and attaining a maximum speed of 335 km/h (208 mph). The four-wheel drive layout and the 8-speed ZF automatic transmission with torque converter are retained from the F-Type while a Quicksilver titanium exhaust system saves 10 kg (22 lb) of weight. The car has light weight 21-inch alloy wheels, acid green accents and brake callipers. The car has a Bridge of Weir Nappa leather interior that is available in 36 colour combinations, with the Lister logos stitched into the headrests and seat pattern to match the front grille. The car was unveiled at the Historic Motorsport International show, at London's ExCeL. The LFT-666 will be built in limited numbers, with only 99 cars to be produced in total having a base price of £141,155 while a carbon fibre bonnet adds £14,850 more to the base price. The owners will also receive access to the exclusive Lister driver's club.

=== The Lister Stealth ===
In August 2020, the Lister Motor Company launched Britain's fastest SUV - the Lister Stealth. Based on the Jaguar F-Pace, the Stealth uses a Lister-modified version of the 5.0-litre supercharged V8 engine found in the factory F-Pace SVR, to achieve a power output of 666 bhp (497 kW) and 881 N⋅m (650 lb⋅ft) of torque. The Stealth accelerates from 0–97 km/h (0–60 mph) in 3.6 seconds and boasts a top speed of 314 km/h (195 mph).

== See also ==
- List of car manufacturers of the United Kingdom
- Lister-Jaguar Monza
