= Scarab Mark I and Scarab Mark II =

Sports racing car

Scarab Mk. I
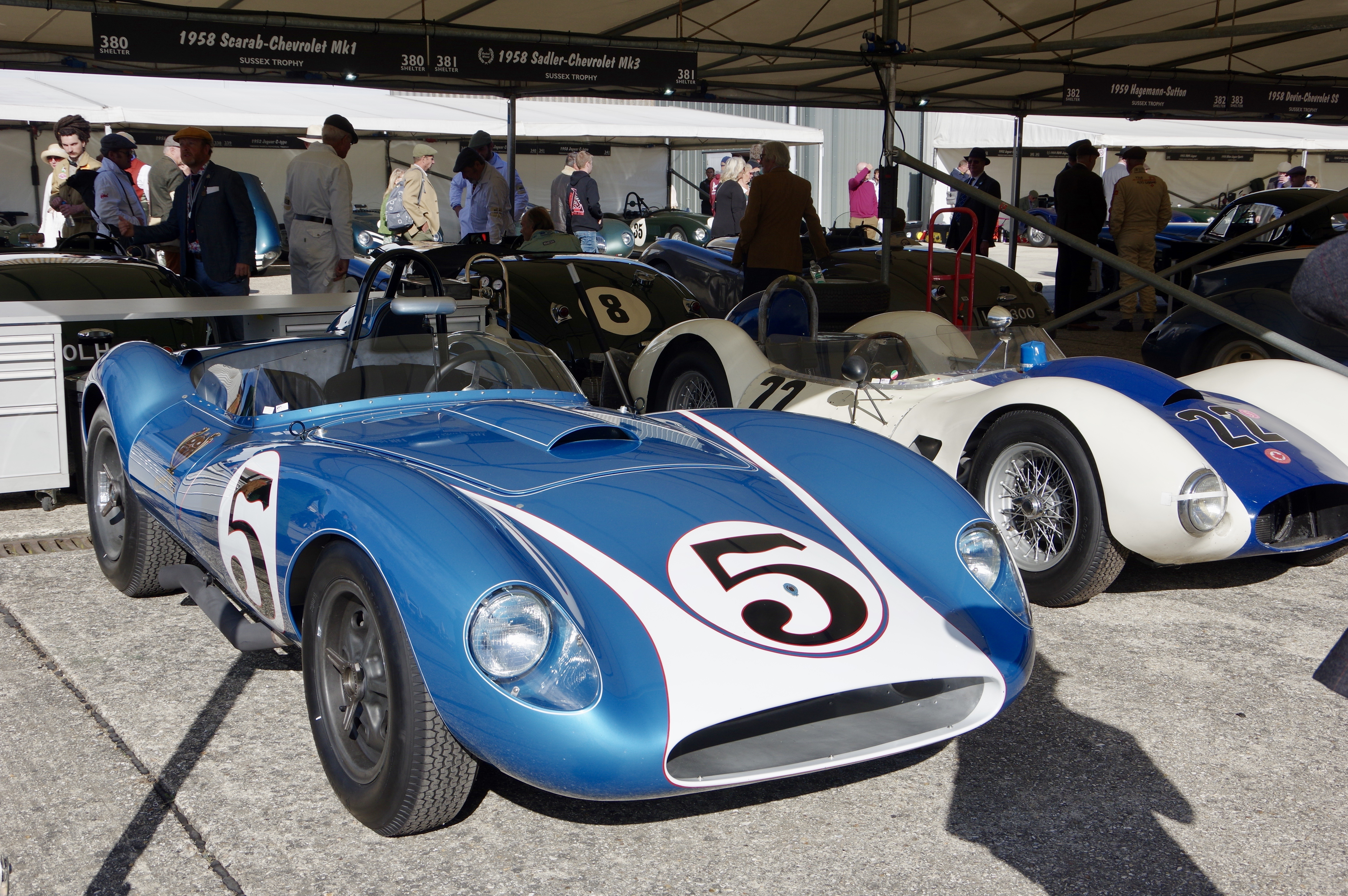
- Category: Sports car racing
- Constructor: Scarab
- Successor: Scarab Mark II

Technical specifications
- Chassis: aluminum body on chrome-moly tubular spaceframe
- Suspension: double wishbones, coil springs, tubular shock absorbers (front); DeDion axle, radius rods, Watts linkage, coil springs, tubular shock absorbers (rear)
- Length: 168 in (4,300 mm)
- Width: 59.5 in (1,510 mm)
- Height: 38 in (970 mm)
- Axle track: Front: 52 in (1,300 mm); Rear: 49 in (1,200 mm)
- Wheelbase: 92 in (2,300 mm)
- Engine: Front engine, longitudinally mounted, 339 cu in (6 L), Chevrolet OHV V8, NA
- Transmission: BorgWarner T10 4-speedmanual
- Power: 385 hp (287 kW) @ 6000 rpm 380 lb⋅ft (520 N⋅m) @ 6000 rpm
- Weight: 1,900 lb (860 kg)
- Brakes: Drum brakes, all-round

Competition history

Scarab Mk. II
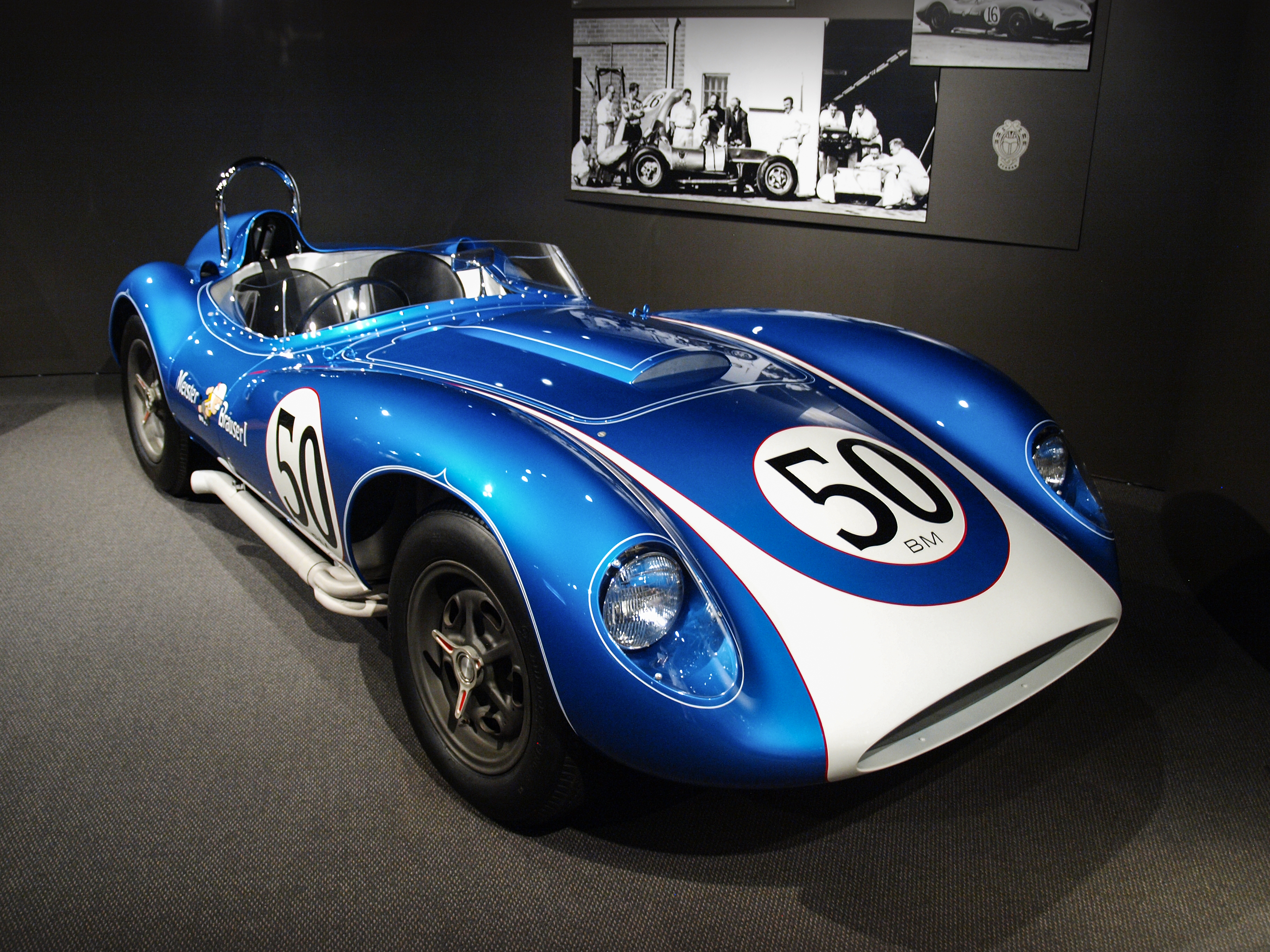
- Category: Sports car racing
- Constructor: Scarab
- Predecessor: Scarab Mark I

Technical specifications
- Chassis: aluminum body on chrome-moly tubular spaceframe
- Suspension: double wishbones, coil springs, tubular shock absorbers (front); DeDion axle, radius rods, Watts linkage, coil springs, tubular shock absorbers (rear)
- Length: 168 in (4,300 mm)
- Width: 59.5 in (1,510 mm)
- Height: 38 in (970 mm)
- Axle track: Front: 52 in (1,300 mm); Rear: 49 in (1,200 mm)
- Wheelbase: 92 in (2,300 mm)
- Engine: Mid-engine, longitudinally mounted, 283–339 cu in (5–6 L), Chevrolet OHV V8, NA
- Transmission: BorgWarner T10 4-speedmanual
- Power: 350–446 hp (261–333 kW); 380–406 lb⋅ft (515–550 N⋅m)
- Weight: 1,900 lb (860 kg)
- Brakes: Drum brakes, all-round

Competition history
- Debut: 1958 SCCA National Montgomery

The Scarab Mk. I was a sports racing car, designed, developed and built by American manufacturer Scarab, between 1957 and 1958, while the Scarab Mk. II was designed, developed and built between 1958 and 1959.

Both models were driven by several notable racers, including Carroll Shelby, Chuck Daigh and Bruce Kessler.

== Background ==
Born in Winfield House, London, on February 24, 1936, Lance Reventlow was the only child of Danish nobleman Count Kurt Haugwitz-Hardenberg-Reventlow and American socialite Barbara Hutton. Hutton had inherited the Woolworth fortune, thus making Lance Reventlow heir to it.

Reventlow began racing in 1955 at 19 years old with a Mercedes 300SL. In 1957, he travelled to Europe with Warren Olson, a distributor for Cooper in Los Angeles, and a Formula Two Cooper T43. Most of the races he attempted to enter rejected him, and during a race at Snetterton Circuit he flipped his Maserati 200S, launching him from the cockpit. By that time, he'd been joined by Bruce Kessler, a friend from when Reventlow was in school, who had won the 500cc Club of America Championship the year prior.

The two planned to build an American car that could race and beat European sports cars in European racing. They travelled to several British companies including Lotus, Cooper and British Racing Motors, before reaching the Lister Motor Company in Cambridge. They met with Brian Lister, getting a tour around the workshop while Reventlow questioned Lister on the vehicles being made there, which were dominant at the time in Britain. Despite how impressed Kessler was by the vehicles, Reventlow was not, believing that they could do better.

Incorporating Reventlow Automobiles in 1957, he hired Olson to manage the Scarab team. The team hired Dick Troutman and Tom Barnes to help build the car, Chuck Daigh as a development engineer, Jim Travers and Frank Coon (founders of Traco Engineering, the best-known racing engine company in the country at the time) Phil Remington (who was later hired as by Carroll Shelby for the Ford GT program), Emil Diedt (who formed the aluminum body of the cars around the around the space-frame chassis), Leo Goossen and Kenneth Howard (who developed the Scarab’s blue metallic paint scheme).

== 1958–1960 ==
The cars were funded by Lance Reventlow and built by Barnes and Troutman in Warren Olson's sports car shop in West Los Angeles, featuring a small block Chevrolet engine from Traco Engineering.

Despite aiming to race and beat European sports cars of the time, during construction European sports car rules were changed so that engine displacement could be no more than 3,000 cubic centimetres (3.0 litres of displacement). Despite trialling the third of the three front engine Scarabs with a four cylinder Meyer-Drake Offenhauser engine to bring it into compliance, the results were described by Daigh as "100 pounds heavier than the Chevy and had 100 horsepower less." As such, they replaced the Offenhauser with the same small block Chevrolet engine as the other two.

After the first was finished in early 1958, it became immediately competitive. At its first test at Willow Springs on January 16, 1958, Daigh broke the lap record, beating it by four seconds a week later. A month later at its official debut at a Sports Car Club of America (SCCA) regional in Phoenix, Arizona, Kessler beat the lap record by six seconds. In May, Reventlow won with it at Santa Barbara. A second was built for Daigh, the right-hand drive Mk. II, and for the rest of the year the two cars won every race they finished in, setting lap records at every track they raced on.

At that year's United States Grand Prix for Sports Cars, the fourth and final round of the United States Auto Club's Road Racing Championship season, two Scarab Mk. IIs and one Mk. I were submitted. In qualifying, Daigh came second in the Mk. II with a time of two minutes and 4.8 seconds, while Reventlow came third in the other Mk. II with a time of two minutes and 8.14 seconds. Reventlow attempted to qualify with the Mk. I as well, but failed.

During the race, Reventlow was hit by a Ferrari 412 S driven by Phil Hill, resulting in damage to the rear of his vehicle and a punctured fuel tank. Despite this, Reventlow carried on, reaching third place by lap seven, but was given a black flag so that the punctured fuel tank could be repaired. Once repaired, officials refused to let the car, now driven by Kessler who had taken over from Reventlow, back on the track, resulting in an "irate outburst" from Reventlow. The "punch up" that followed resulted in him and the car being disqualified.

A fierce battle occurred between Daigh and Hill through the majority of the race, which ended after, on lap 20, Hill's Ferrari started to suffer from fuel vaporisation due to the 100 °F (38 °C) heat, eventually forcing him to retire later in the race. Daigh's Mk. II suffered as well, with a damaged differential, brakes that were overheating and worries about the fuel consumption of the car. Despite this, he still won the race. As the year ended, the Scarabs also won at Laguna Seca and Nassau Speed Week, where Reventlow won the Governor’s Cup and he and Daigh drove in the Nassau Trophy feature, winning it.

Even after the Mk IIs were sold, the cars continued to win races under Nickey Nouse and Meister Bräuser, where it was driven by Augie Pabst for the 1960 Pacific Grand Prix, a part of the USAC Road Racing Championship. As of 2008, Augie Pabst still owned the Mk. II he raced with. Another Mk. II was also driven by Shelby during the 1960 USAC Road Racing Championship, where on June 26 he broke the lap record twice, winning the race.

== Post-closure of Scarab ==
=== Originals ===
Despite shutting down the company in 1962 Reventlow kept the original prototype, the left-hand drive Mk. I, Chassis 001, which his friend Raoul Balcaen converted into a street-legal car. Reventlow later sold it, and as of 2016 the owner was Rob Walton.

Augie Pabst, as of 2008, still owned the same Mk. II, Chassis 002, that he drove under Meister Bräuser.

=== Replicas ===
An exact replica of the Chassis 002 Mk. II was built using the original plans by Troutman and Barnes in 1983 for the 25th anniversary of the car by Reventlow's brother, Richard Reventlow. Funded by a collector, Augie Pabst was approached to see if they could have access to his car, to which he agreed, allowing his car to be photographed and documented, which took over three years.

Following its construction, the car was presented to some of the original team at Scarab, all of which said that it was an exact replica of Chassis 002. The team at Meister Bräuser also signed a certificate of authenticity stating that it was an exact replica. It later gained an FIA certification, with which it gained its Historical Technical Passport, valid until 2027, allowing it to drive in races around the world.

In 2017, an FIA certification was given to a set of 20 replicas of the Mk. II.

=== 50th anniversary ===
In July 2008, several Scarabs were raced at the Kohler International Challenge at Road America, marking the 50th anniversary of the first race a Scarab took part in, with said replica in attendance. Several members of the original team were also in attendance, including Olson and his wife, Simone (who managed the bookkeeping), Remington, Chuck Pelly, Kessler and Balcaen. Kessler said of the event "If he were here, Lance would be smiling from ear to ear. Nobody ever thought at the time that these cars would still be racing 50 years later."
