= Ferrari 412 S =

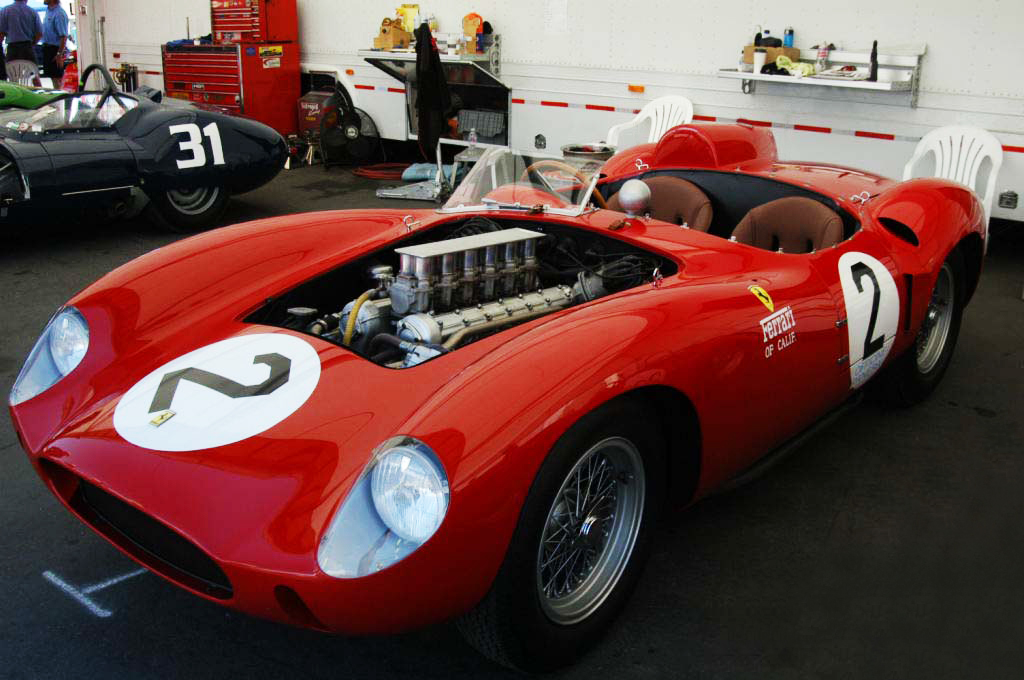

Overview
- Manufacturer: Ferrari
- Also called: Ferrari 412 MI
- Production: 1958; 1 converted from 312 S
- Designer: Carrozzeria Scaglietti

Body and chassis
- Body style: Spyder
- Layout: Front mid-engine, rear-wheel-drive

Powertrain
- Engine: 4.0 L (4023.32 cc) Tipo 141 Jano V12
- Power output: 432 PS
- Transmission: 4-speed manual

Dimensions
- Wheelbase: 2,350 mm (92.5 in)
- Curb weight: 880 kg (1,940 lb)

Chronology
- Predecessor: Ferrari 335 S

The Ferrari 412 S was a unique sports racing car produced by Ferrari in 1958. The 412 S combined Ferrari's most powerful V12 engine to date with a one-off experimental sportscar racing chassis. The two-seater was also incorrectly called 412 MI due to being built around an engine from the 412 MI single-seater used in the June 1958 "500 Miles of Monza" Race of Two Worlds between European and Indy-500-cars on the fast Monza oval. The car was created specifically for a Ferrari dealer in California to take on the Chevy V8-powered American racing cars of Scarab in SCCA racing. Its famed drivers included Phil Hill and Richie Ginther.

== 312 S ==
The Ferrari 312 S was an experimental prototype sports car, created in 1958 by Ferrari to comply with 3.0-litre cap imposed by FIA/CSI on the 1958 World Sportscar Championship after the tragic 1957 Mille Miglia events. Only one chassis was ever built, s/n 0744. It was powered by a new 3.0-litre Tipo 142 Jano V12 engine with twin overhead camshafts per bank. The internal measurements were identical to the 250 Colombo engine as were the total displacement of 2,953.21 cc (3.0 L; 180.2 cu in). The maximum power output was 20 PS higher than the 250 TR at 320 PS (235 kW; 316 hp) at 8400 rpm. Fuel was fed by six Weber 42DCN carburettors. Ignition was by a single spark plug per cylinder, served by two magnetos.

The tubular steel chassis design was of an experimental Type 524. The chassis featured a rear-mounted, transverse gearbox en bloc with the differential. The front suspension was independent with upper and lower A-arms. The rear suspension consisted of De Dion axle with twin radius arms and transverse leaf spring. The whole car weighed in at 750 kg (1,653 lb), while the 250 TR was 800 kg (1,764 lb).

Its single non-championship race was the Grand Prix Spa one hour sprint race for sports cars on 18 May 1958 at Spa-Francorchamps. The car was entered by Scuderia Ferrari and driven by Olivier Gendebien. He retired after only four laps with a faulty transmission. After this race the car was modified, reengined and renamed as the 412 S.

== Development ==
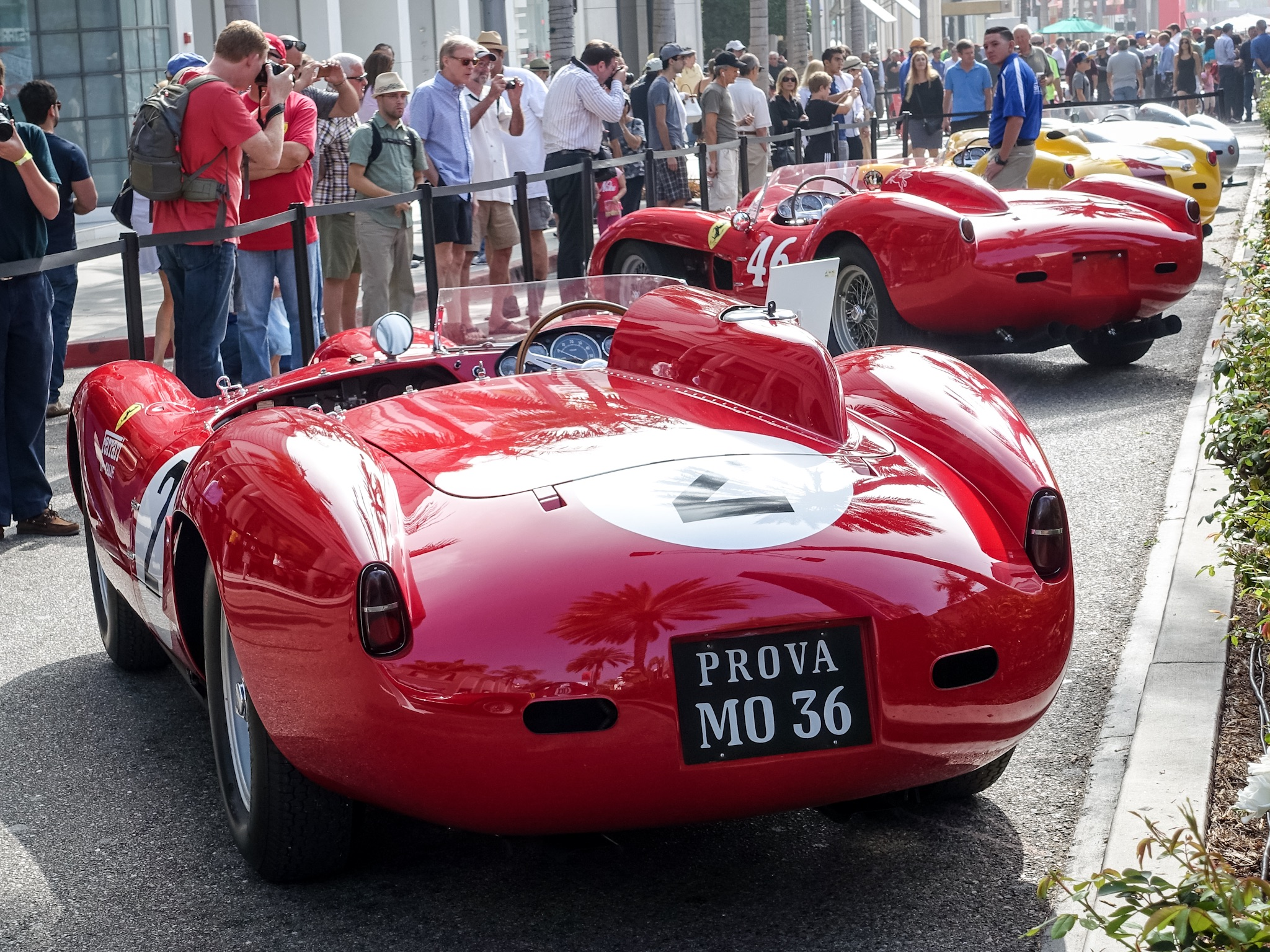
Ferrari 412 S rear view, next to 250 TR.

The only example of the Ferrari 412 S was created on the 312 S' experimental chassis, combined with the 412 MI-sourced engine. The car retained the s/n 0744 from its predecessor. The engine installed was the Tipo 141 with twin overhead cams as used aboard the 412 MI single-seater in the 500 Miles of Monza in June 1958, and because of this the car is also erroneously known as the 412 MI. The engine type was even earlier used in Alfonso de Portago's Ferrari 335 S racer from the ill-fated 1957 Mille Miglia.

The car, delivered in September 1958, was built exclusively for Ferrari of California distributor John von Neumann (1921–2003), an Austrian who in 1948 started „Competition Motors“ in North Hollywood and in 1951 purchased a Porsche 356, thus not to be confused with scientist John von Neumann (1903 – 1957). Von Neumann paid twice the price of the new Ferrari 250 TRs as it was created expressly to be able to compete against Reventlow's Scarabs of American SCCA racing series.

The 412 S was clothed in a Scaglietti two-seater, spyder body.

This one-off race car was sold on RM Sotheby's auction in Monterey in August 2006 for US$5.6 million.

== Specifications ==
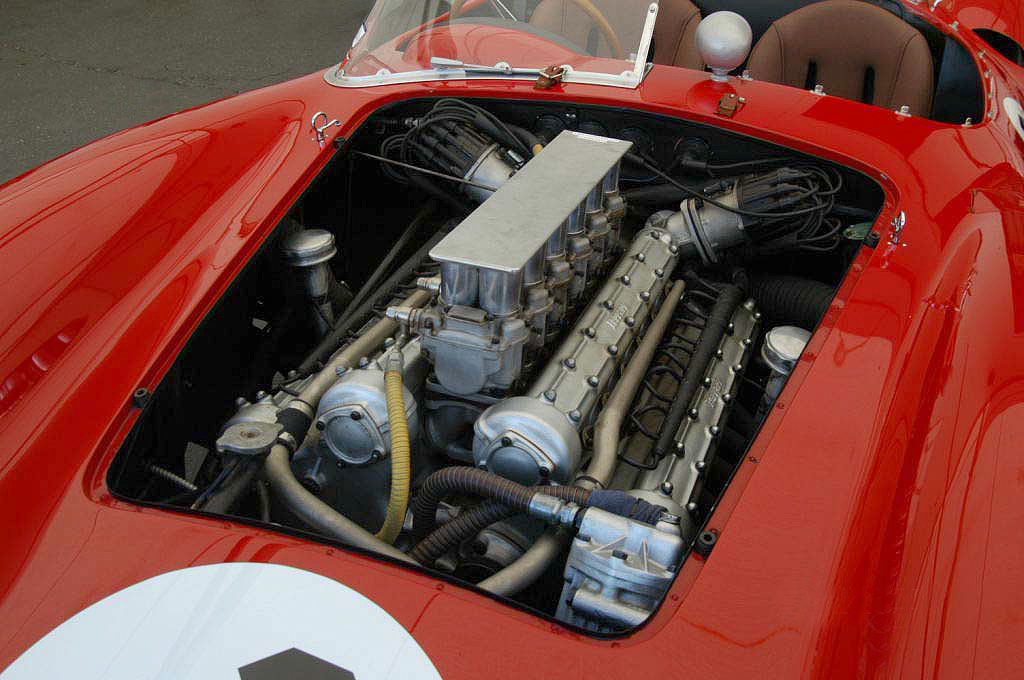
4.0-litre Jano V12 engine.

=== Engine and transmission ===
The Ferrari 412 S was powered by a 4.0-litre Tipo 141 Jano V12 engine with twin overhead camshaft per bank and two valves per cylinder. The internal measurements were identical to those of 335 S and the total displacement of 4,023.32 cc (4.0 L; 245.5 cu in). The maximum poweroutput was 432 PS (318 kW; 426 hp) at 8000 rpm, detuned from the original 412 MI. Compression ratio was 9.9:1 and fuel was fed by six Weber 42DCN carburettors. The engine used twin spark plugs per cylinder, served by two coils and a dry sump lubrication system. Manual transmission had four forward speeds.

=== Chassis and suspension ===
The front suspension was independent with dual wishbones, coil springs and hydraulic shock absorbers. At the rear the 412 S had De Dion axle with twin radius arms, transverse leaf spring and hydraulic shock absorbers. Originally the car had hydraulic drum brakes, but those were replaced by the factory in 1959 for disc brakes. Fuel tank had a capacity of 196 litres.

== Racing ==
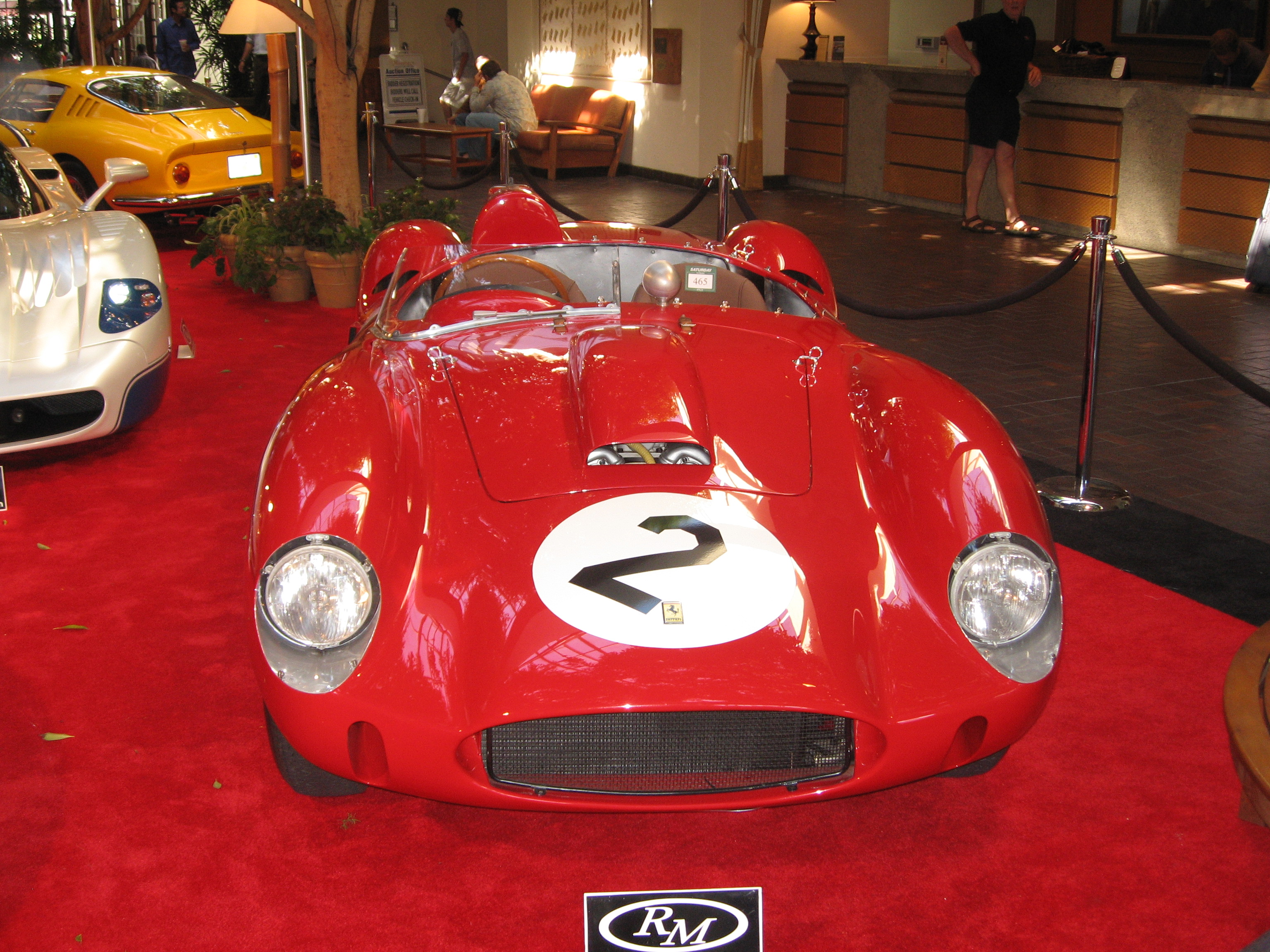
412 S front view.

John von Neumann took the delivery of the 412 S in 1958, in USA, and campaigned the car in the September-October 1958 USAC Road Racing Championship under Ferrari Representatives of California team. The car was painted silver with a dark strip. By 28 September the 412 S had its first outing in USAC International Formula Libre Grand Prix at Watkins Glen. Car was driven by Phil Hill who reported handling problems, and ultimately retired with a broken driveshaft.

In October 1958, the car was entered in Los Angeles Times Grand Prix, a championship race at Riverside. Phil Hill qualified on second position for the race, two seconds behind the Reventlow's Scarab Mk. II-Chevrolet and four seconds quicker than von Neumann's Ferrari 335 S. The start of the race Hill and Chuck Daigh traded the leading position many times. The high temperatures caused problems with a fuel pump and fuel vapors. When the mechanical fuel pump overheated the electric one failed to work in time and forced Hill to pit on his 21st lap. When Ferrari pitted twice more, the Scarab secured the lead. Hill finally retired on 58th lap, just four laps before finish. The 1958 United States Grand Prix for Sports Cars was ultimately won by the Reventlow's Scarab with Ferrari 375 Plus, driven by a future champion Dan Gurney, on second place.

By 1959, Eleanor von Neumann, took possession of the 412 S as a part of her divorce settlement. The car was fielded in 1959 USAC Road Racing Championship, with its first race the Kiwanis Grand Prix at Riverside. This time the car was driven by Richie Ginther and repainted silver and red. Ginther scored the fastest qualifying time and in the race won against smaller engined Porsche 718 RSKs. This would remain the only 412 S' victory. The next race, also at Riverside, was a 200 miles long Los Angeles Times Grand Prix. Richie Ginther qualified on pole for the race but had to retire on lap 35 with a faulty fuel feed. After that the car was sent back to the factory for a disc brake conversion and became one of the first Ferraris with this improvement. In December, Ginther scored a second place in the 5 Lap Governor's Trophy over 2-litres at Nassau, Bahamas. Over the same week, at the 12 Lap Governor's Trophy race, Ginther retired on the fifth lap. During the final race, the Nassau Trophy, Englebert tires degraded quickly on the coral surface and failed after 15 laps. Ten laps later the car retired with a broken gearbox. The last race of Richie Ginther behind the wheel of the 412 S was at the 1960 Los Angeles Times Grand Prix. The car retired again with gearbox problems. In 1961, Frederick Knoop continued to campaign the car in SCCA racing, scoring third place at Riverside preliminary heat and second at main event. Skip Hudson then raced a couple more races during that same year, but to no avail.
