= 1958 United States Grand Prix for Sports Cars =

Riverside International Raceway

The 1958 United States Grand Prix for Sports Cars was a sports car race held at Riverside International Raceway on October 12, 1958. It was the fourth and final round of the 1958 USAC Road Racing Championship season, the seventeenth round of the Sports Car Club of America's Pacific Coast Championship, the second running of the Riverside Grand Prix, and the first post-World War II running of the United States Grand Prix. The race was held over 62 laps of Riverside's 3.3-mile (5.3 km) circuit, for a total of 203.1 miles (326.9 km). Chuck Daigh won the race overall, driving one of Lance Reventlow's Scarab-Chevrolets. The race is also noteworthy in the annals of international racing, as the strong second-place finish by a local driver named Dan Gurney earned him a test drive in a factory Ferrari Formula 1 car, effectively launching the Californian's legendary racing career.

The weather at this event was very warm, even for a desert climate that routinely saw daytime temperatures of 100F plus during the summer. On race day the temperature reached an extraordinary high for the era 95 °F (35 °C); with winds gusting up to 9.9 miles per hour (15.9 km/h) on race day. Even with the global warming that emerged decades after the late 1950s, the maximum temperature of Riverside, California never exceeded 79.2 °F (26.2 °C) for the month of October 2013.

== Entry ==
The race was open to cars meeting the Sports Car Club of America's B Modified through G Modified classes. Although named "modified", most of the cars in classes C through G were factory-built sports racing cars. The field was unusually large for an American sports car race, attracted in large part by a large purse consisting of $14,500 ($158,028.26 in today's money).

Class	Displacement
B Modified	5000-8000cc
C Modified	3000-5000cc
D Modified	2000-3000cc
E Modified	1500-2000cc
F Modified	1100-1500cc
G Modified	750-1100cc

== Qualifying ==
Pole position winners in each class are marked in bold.

Pos	Class	Car	Driver	Lap Time
1	**BM**	**#5 Scarab Mk II-Chevrolet**	**Chuck Daigh**	**02:04.0**
2	**CM**	**#2 Ferrari 412 S**	**Phil Hill**	**02:06.0**
3	BM	#3 Scarab Mk II-Chevrolet	Lance Reventlow	02:08.1
4	CM	#59 Aston Martin DBR2	Bob Oker	02:09.7
5	CM	#69 Ferrari 375 Plus	Dan Gurney	02:10.2
6	CM	#11 Ferrari 335 S	John von Neumann	02:10.8
7	BM	#70 Ol' Yaller Mk.I-Buick	Max Balchowsky	02:11.1
8	**DM**	**#159 Aston Martin DBR1**	**Roy Salvadori**	**02:11.6**
9	DM	#211 Ferrari 250 TR	Richie Ginther	02:12.3
10	BM	#172 Kurtis 500X-Cadillac	Jerry Unser	02:12.4
11	CM	#27 Jaguar D-Type	Bill Krause	02:13.6
12	BM	#111 Devin-Chevrolet Special	Ak Miller	02:13.7
13	**FM**	**#7 Porsche 718 RSK**	**Jean Behra**	**02:14.3**
14	BM	#14 Lister-Corvette	Bill Pollack	02:15.5
15	CM	#88 Ferrari 410 S	Masten Gregory	02:15.6
16	CM	#78 Maserati 450S	Carroll Shelby	02:15.6
17	BM	#229 Chevrolet Special	Clem Proctor	02:17.6
18	BM	#264 Huffaker Special-Chrysler	Fred Knoop	02:17.7
19	**EM**	**#50 Porsche 550 RS Spyder**	**Ken Miles**	**02:18.0**
20	FM	#126 Lotus Eleven	Pat Pigott	02:18.6
21	EM	#155 Ferrari 500 TR	Sam Weiss	02:18.8
22	BM	#149 Zidar Special (Kurtis-Corvette)	Ray Crawford	02:19.8
23	**GM**	**#125 Lotus Eleven**	**Pete Lovely**	**02:21.8**
24	BM	#98 Maserati 450S-Pontiac	Jim Rathmann	02:22.9
25	GM	#127 Lotus Eleven-Climax	Skip Conklin	02:23.4
26	EM	#9 Meyer-Drake Special-Offenhauser	Bill Cantrell	02:24.0
27	FM	#49 Cooper-Climax	Bob Drake	02:24.3
28	FM	#117 Osca TN	Harry Hanford	02:24.4
29	FM	#4 Lotus Eleven	Lew Florence	02:24.6
30	EM	#135 Ferrari 500 TR	Alan Markelson	02:24.9
31	CM	#129 HWM-Chevrolet	Ralph Ormsbee	02:25.3
32	BM	#96 Kurtis-Ford	Marvin Porter	02:25.4
33	BM	#110 Caballo de Hiero Mk II-Oldsmobile	Bobby Unser	02:26.3
34	EM	#121 Ferrari 500 TRC	Frank Becker	02:26.3
35	BM	#93 Buick Special	Floyd Burt	02:27.6
36	FM	#122 Cooper-Porsche	Tom Meehan	02:28.2
37	FM	#124 Porsche 550 RS Spyder	George Keck	02:28.3
38	DM	#259 Aston Martin DB3S	William de Creeft	02:28.8
39	EM	#35 Osca 2000	Pearce Woods	02:29.0
40	BM	#140 Kurtis-Buick	Bill Cheesbourg	02:30.1
41	EM	#23 Lotus Mark X	John Timanus	02:30.4
42	DM	#118 Porsche 356 Carrera GT Coupe	Jean Pierre Kunstle	02:34.2
43	DM	#138 Duncan Special	Bill Love	02:35.3
44	EM	#26 Ferrari 500 TR	Gordon Glyer	02:36.5
45	BM	#6 Kurtis-Buick	Troy Ruttman	no time
46	BM	#181 Mercedes-Benz 300 SL-Corvette	Johnnie Parsons	no time
DNQ	FM	#8 Maserati 150S	Dusty Miller	–
DNQ	BM	#16 Scarab Mk I-Chevrolet	Lance Reventlow	–
DNQ	BM	#52 Kurtis-Corvette	Bert Ruttman	–
DNQ	CM	#77 Ferrari 735 LM	Rodger Ward	–
DNQ	EM	#114 Sebring 2000SS	Hank Tubman	–

== Race result ==
Class winners marked in bold.

Pos	Class	No	Team	Drivers	Car	Laps
1	**BM**	**5**	**Reventlow Automobile Incorporated**	**(United States) Chuck Daigh**	**Scarab Mk II**	**62**
1	**BM**	**5**	**Reventlow Automobile Incorporated**	**(United States) Chuck Daigh**	**Chevrolet Corvette 5.5L V8**	**62**
2	**CM**	**69**	**Frank Arciero**	**(United States) Dan Gurney**	**Ferrari 375 Plus**	**62**
2	**CM**	**69**	**Frank Arciero**	**(United States) Dan Gurney**	**Ferrari 5.0L V12**	**62**
3	CM	27	Frank Millard	(United States) Bill Krause	Jaguar D-Type	62
3	CM	27	Frank Millard	(United States) Bill Krause	Jaguar XK 3.9L I6	62
4	**FM**	**7**	**Porsche AG**	**(France) Jean Behra**	**Porsche 718 RSK**	**61**
4	**FM**	**7**	**Porsche AG**	**(France) Jean Behra**	**Porsche 1.5L Flat-4**	**61**
5	**DM**	**211**	**Ferrari Representatives of California**	**(United States) Richie Ginther**	**Ferrari 250 TR**	**61**
5	**DM**	**211**	**Ferrari Representatives of California**	**(United States) Richie Ginther**	**Ferrari Tipo 128 3.0L V12**	**61**
6	DM	159	David Brown	(United Kingdom) Roy Salvadori	Aston Martin DBR1	61
6	DM	159	David Brown	(United Kingdom) Roy Salvadori	Aston Martin 2.9L I6	61
7	BM	70	Motor Trend Magazine	(United States) Max Balchowsky	Ol'Yaller Mk.1	60
7	BM	70	Motor Trend Magazine	(United States) Max Balchowsky	Buick 5.3L V8	60
8	BM	14	Dean Van Lines	(United States) Bill Pollack	Lister	60
8	BM	14	Dean Van Lines	(United States) Bill Pollack	Chevrolet Corvette 5.8L V8	60
9	**EM**	**50**	**Precision Motor Cars**	**(United Kingdom) Ken Miles**	**Porsche 550 RS**	**60**
9	**EM**	**50**	**Precision Motor Cars**	**(United Kingdom) Ken Miles**	**Porsche 1.6L Flat-4**	**60**
10	FM	49	Top Equipment Co.	(United States) Bob Drake	Cooper	58
10	FM	49	Top Equipment Co.	(United States) Bob Drake	Coventry Climax 1.5L I4	58
11	CM	88	John Edgar	(United States) Masten Gregory	Ferrari 410 S	57
11	CM	88	John Edgar	(United States) Masten Gregory	Ferrari 5.0L V12	57
12	EM	26	Gordon Glyer	(United States) Gordon Glyer	Ferrari 500 TR	57
12	EM	26	Gordon Glyer	(United States) Gordon Glyer	Ferrari Tipo 131 2.0L I4	57
13	CM	129	Team Empire	(United States) Ralph Ormsbee	HWM	57
13	CM	129	Team Empire	(United States) Ralph Ormsbee	Chevrolet 5.0L V8	57
14	FM	117	Tim Considine	(United States) Harry Hanford	Osca TN	57
14	FM	117	Tim Considine	(United States) Harry Hanford	Osca 1.5L I4	57
15	EM	135	Alan Markelson	(United States) Alan Markelson	Ferrari 500 TR	56
15	EM	135	Alan Markelson	(United States) Alan Markelson	Ferrari Tipo 131 2.0L I4	56
16	EM	9	Mar-Chris Co.	(United States) Bill Cantrell	Meyer-Drake Special	56
16	EM	9	Mar-Chris Co.	(United States) Bill Cantrell	Offenhauser 1.7L	56
17	EM	121	Team Empire	(United States) Frank Becker	Ferrari 500 TRC	55
17	EM	121	Team Empire	(United States) Frank Becker	Ferrari 2.0L I4	55
18	**GM**	**127**	**Skip Conklin**	**(United States) Skip Conklin**	**Lotus Eleven**	**55**
18	**GM**	**127**	**Skip Conklin**	**(United States) Skip Conklin**	**Climax 1.1L I4**	**55**
19	FM	124	Team Empire	(United States) George Keck	Porsche 550 RS	54
19	FM	124	Team Empire	(United States) George Keck	Porsche 1.5L Flat-4	54
20	DM	118	Jean Pierre Kunstle	(United States) Jean Pierre Kunstle	Porsche 356 Carrera GT	54
20	DM	118	Jean Pierre Kunstle	(United States) Jean Pierre Kunstle	Porsche 1.5L Flat-4	54
21	DM	259	William de Creeft	(United States) William de Creeft	Aston Martin DB3S	52
21	DM	259	William de Creeft	(United States) William de Creeft	Aston Martin 2.9L I6	52
22	EM	35	C. Vernon	(United States) Pearce Woods	Osca 2000	47
22	EM	35	C. Vernon	(United States) Pearce Woods	Osca 2.0L	47
23	DM	138	West Coast Racing	(United States) Bill Love	Duncan Special	44
23	DM	138	West Coast Racing	(United States) Bill Love	Triumph TR2 2.2L	44
24	EM	23	John Timanus	(United States) John Timanus	Lotus Mark X	39
24	EM	23	John Timanus	(United States) John Timanus	1.4L (Supercharged) I4	39
25 DNF	CM	2	Ferrari Representatives of California	(United States) Phil Hill	Ferrari 412 S	55
25 DNF	CM	2	Ferrari Representatives of California	(United States) Phil Hill	Ferrari 4.0L V12 DOHC	55
26 DNF	GM	125	Team Empire	(United States) Pete Lovely	Lotus Eleven	54
26 DNF	GM	125	Team Empire	(United States) Pete Lovely	Coventry Climax FWA 1.1L I4	54
27 DNF	FM	126	Team Empire	(United States) Pat Pigott	Lotus Eleven	46
27 DNF	FM	126	Team Empire	(United States) Pat Pigott	Coventry Climax 1.5L I4	46
28 DNF	FM	4	Team Empire	(United States) Lew Florence	Lotus Eleven	25
28 DNF	FM	4	Team Empire	(United States) Lew Florence	Coventry Climax 1.5L I4	25
29 DNF	BM	93	Floyd Burt	(United States) Floyd Burt	Buick Special	23
29 DNF	BM	93	Floyd Burt	(United States) Floyd Burt	Buick	23
30 DNF	BM	149	Ray Crawford	(United States) Ray Crawford	"Zidar Special" Kurtis	20
30 DNF	BM	149	Ray Crawford	(United States) Ray Crawford	Chevrolet Corvette 5.5L V8	20
31 DNF	BM	181	Chuck Porter	(United States) Johnnie Parsons	Mercedes-Benz 300 SL Special	16
31 DNF	BM	181	Chuck Porter	(United States) Johnnie Parsons	Chevrolet Corvette (Supercharged) 5.0L V8	16
32 DNF	BM	264	Fred Knoop	(United States) Fred Knoop	Huffaker-Chrysler Special	13
32 DNF	BM	264	Fred Knoop	(United States) Fred Knoop	Chrysler 5.2L V8	13
33 DNF	BM	3	Reventlow Automobile Incorporated	(United States) Lance Reventlow	Scarab Mk II-Chevrolet	9
33 DNF	BM	3	Reventlow Automobile Incorporated	(United States) Lance Reventlow	Chevrolet Corvette 5.5L V8	9
34 DNF	BM	140	Alex Budurin	(United States) Bill Cheesbourg	Kurtis Kraft	8
34 DNF	BM	140	Alex Budurin	(United States) Bill Cheesbourg	Buick	8
35 DNF	BM	172	Mickey Thompson	(United States) Jerry Unser	Kurtis 500 X2	7
35 DNF	BM	172	Mickey Thompson	(United States) Jerry Unser	Cadillac 5.6L V8	7
36 DNF	BM	6	Bill Murphy's Buick	(United States) Troy Ruttman	Kurtis Kraft	7
36 DNF	BM	6	Bill Murphy's Buick	(United States) Troy Ruttman	Buick 5.1L V8	7
37 DNF	FM	122	Team Empire	(United States) Tom Meehan	Cooper	6
37 DNF	FM	122	Team Empire	(United States) Tom Meehan	Porsche 1.5L Flat-4	6
38 DNF	CM	78	Temple Buell	(United States) Carroll Shelby	Maserati 450S	4
38 DNF	CM	78	Temple Buell	(United States) Carroll Shelby	Maserati 4.7L V8 DOHC	4
39 DNF	BM	96		Marvin Porter	Kurtis Kraft	4
39 DNF	BM	96		Marvin Porter	Ford	4
40 DNF	BM	110	Ak Miller	(United States) Bobby Unser	Caballo de Hiero Mk II	3
40 DNF	BM	110	Ak Miller	(United States) Bobby Unser	Oldsmobile 6.2L V8	3
41 DNF	EM	155	Sam Weiss	(United States) Sam Weiss	Ferrari 500 TR	1
41 DNF	EM	155	Sam Weiss	(United States) Sam Weiss	Ferrari Tipo 131 2.0L I4	1
42 DNF	CM	11	Ferrari Representatives of California	(United States) John von Neumann	Ferrari 335 S	0
42 DNF	CM	11	Ferrari Representatives of California	(United States) John von Neumann	Ferrari 4.0L V12 DOHC	0
43 DNF	BM	111	Ak Miller	(United States) Ak Miller	Devin Special	0
43 DNF	BM	111	Ak Miller	(United States) Ak Miller	Chevrolet 5.6L V8	0
DNS	CM	59	David Brown	(United States) Bob Oker	Aston Martin DBR2	–
DNS	CM	59	David Brown	(United States) Bob Oker	Aston Martin 3.9L I6	–
DNS	BM	98	John Engar	(United States) Jim Rathmann	Maserati 450S	–
DNS	BM	98	John Engar	(United States) Jim Rathmann	Pontiac 6.3L V8	–
DNS	BM	229	Clem Proctor	(United States) Clem Proctor	Chevrolet Special	–
DNS	BM	229	Clem Proctor	(United States) Clem Proctor	Chevrolet (Supercharged) 4.6L V8	–
DNQ	FM	8	Dusty Miller	(United States) Dusty Miller	Maserati 150S	–
DNQ	FM	8	Dusty Miller	(United States) Dusty Miller	Maserati 1.5L I4	–
DNQ	BM	16	Reventlow Automobile Incorporated	(United States) Lance Reventlow	Scarab Mk I-Chevrolet	–
DNQ	BM	16	Reventlow Automobile Incorporated	(United States) Lance Reventlow	Chevrolet Corvette 5.5L V8	–
DNQ	BM	52	Engine Masters	(United States) Bert Ruttman	Kurtis Kraft	–
DNQ	BM	52	Engine Masters	(United States) Bert Ruttman	Chevrolet Corvette V8	–
DNQ	CM	77	Italia Motors	(United States) Rodger Ward	Ferrari 735 LM	–
DNQ	CM	77	Italia Motors	(United States) Rodger Ward	Ferrari 4.4L I6	–
DNQ	EM	114	Dean Van Lines	(United States) Hank Tubman	Sebring 2000 SS	–
DNQ	EM	114	Dean Van Lines	(United States) Hank Tubman	2.0L	–

- Time of race: 2 hours, 17 minutes, 15 seconds
- Average speed: 88.87 mph (143.02 km/h)

== Support races ==
Two support races were held: a production car race won by Skip Hudson in a Chevrolet Corvette, and an under-1400cc race won by Jock Ross in a Cooper-Climax.

Preceded by 1958 Watkins Glen Formula Libre Grand Prix	USAC Road Racing Championship; 1958 season	Succeeded by none
Preceded by 1957 Riverside National Championship Sports Car Races	Riverside Grand Prix	Succeeded by 1959 United States Grand Prix for Sports Cars
Preceded by 1916 American Grand Prize	United States Grand Prix	Succeeded by 1959 United States Grand Prix
