= Los Angeles Times Grand Prix =

Former auto race (1957–1987)

Riverside International Raceway

The Los Angeles Times Grand Prix was a sports car race held at the Riverside International Raceway. The race was held throughout the track's existence, from 1957 until 1987. The race was sponsored by the Los Angeles Times to raise money for its charities. The Special Events director was Glenn Davis, the winner of the 1946 Heisman Trophy. During the early 1970s, the event was the season ending race for the Can-Am series.

== Results ==
Year	Overall winner(s)	Entrant	Car	Distance/Duration	Race title	Report
SCCA National Championship
1957	(United States) Carroll Shelby	John Edgar	Maserati 450S	92.5 mi (148.9 km)	Riverside National Championship Sports Car Races	report
USAC Road Racing Championship
1958	(United States) Chuck Daigh	Reventlow Automobile Incorporated	Scarab Mk II-Chevrolet	200 mi (320 km)	United States Grand Prix for Sports Cars	report
1959	(United States) Phil Hill	Eleanor von Neumann	Ferrari 250 TR 59	200 mi (320 km)	United States Grand Prix for Sports Cars	report
1960	(United States) Bill Krause	Maserati Representatives of California	Maserati Tipo 61	200 mi (320 km)	Grand Prix for Sports Cars	report
1961	(Australia) Jack Brabham	Brabham Racing	Cooper Monaco T61-Climax	200 mi (320 km)	Grand Prix for Sports Cars	report
1962	(United States) Roger Penske	Updraught Enterprises	Cooper T53-Climax	200 mi (320 km)	Los Angeles Times presents the Grand Prix for Sports Cars	report
Non-Championship
1963	(United States) Dave MacDonald	Shelby American	Cooper Monaco T61M - Ford	200 mi (320 km)	Los Angeles Times Grand Prix	report
1964	(United States) Parnelli Jones	Shelby American	Cooper Monaco T61-Ford	200 mi (320 km)	Los Angeles Times Grand Prix	report
1965	(United States) Hap Sharp	Chaparral Cars	Chaparral 2A-Chevrolet	200 mi (320 km)	Los Angeles Times Grand Prix	report
Can-Am
1966	(United Kingdom) John Surtees	Team Surtees	Lola T70 Mk.2-Chevrolet	200 mi (320 km)	Los Angeles Times Grand Prix	report
1967	(New Zealand) Bruce McLaren	Bruce McLaren Motor Racing	McLaren M6A-Chevrolet	200 mi (320 km)	Los Angeles Times Grand Prix	report
1968	(New Zealand) Bruce McLaren	Bruce McLaren Motor Racing	McLaren M8A-Chevrolet	200 mi (320 km)	Los Angeles Times Grand Prix	report
1969	(New Zealand) Denny Hulme	Bruce McLaren Motor Racing	McLaren M8B-Chevrolet	200 mi (320 km)	Los Angeles Times Grand Prix	report
1970	(New Zealand) Denny Hulme	Bruce McLaren Motor Racing	McLaren M8D-Chevrolet	200 mi (320 km)	Los Angeles Times Grand Prix	report
1971	(New Zealand) Denny Hulme	McLaren Cars, Ltd.	McLaren M8F-Chevrolet	200 mi (320 km)	Los Angeles Times Grand Prix	report
1972	(United States) George Follmer	Roger Penske	Porsche 917/10	200 mi (320 km)	Los Angeles Times Grand Prix	report
1973	(United States) Mark Donohue	Roger Penske	Porsche 917/30	200 mi (320 km)	Los Angeles Times Grand Prix	report
1974: Not held
IMSA GT Championship
1975	(West Germany) Hans-Joachim Stuck (Austria) Dieter Quester	BMW Motorsport	BMW 3.0 CSL	6 hours	6 Hours of Riverside	report
1976–1978: Not held
1979	(United States) Bill Whittington (United States) Don Whittington	Whittington Brothers Racing	Porsche 935/79	6 hours	Los Angeles Times Grand Prix of Endurance	report
1980	(United States) Dick Barbour (United Kingdom) John Fitzpatrick	Dick Barbour Racing	Porsche 935 K3	5 hours	Los Angeles Times/Toyota Grand Prix of Endurance	report
1981^{A}	(United Kingdom) John Fitzpatrick (United States) Jim Busby	John Fitzpatrick Racing	Porsche 935 K3/80	6 hours	Los Angeles Times/Toyota Grand Prix of Endurance	report
1982	(United States) Ted Field (United States) Bill Whittington	Interscope Racing	Lola T600-Chevrolet	6 hours	Times/Toyota Grand Prix	report
1983	(United Kingdom) John Fitzpatrick (United Kingdom) David Hobbs (United Kingdom) Derek Bell	John Fitzpatrick Racing	Porsche 935 K4	6 hours	Times/Datsun Grand Prix	report
1984	(United States) Randy Lanier (United States) Bill Whittington	Blue Thunder Racing	March 84G-Chevrolet	6 hours	Times/Nissan Grand Prix	report
1985	(United States) Pete Halsmer (United States) John Morton	BF Goodrich	Porsche 962	600 km (370 mi)	Times/Nissan Grand Prix of Endurance	report
1986	(United States) Rob Dyson (United States) Price Cobb	Dyson Racing	Porsche 962	6 hours	Times/Ford Grand Prix	report
1987	(United States) John Morton (United States) Hurley Haywood	Group 44	Jaguar XJR-7	500 km (310 mi)	Los Angeles Times Grand Prix	report

^A The 1981 event was also a part of the World Sportscar Championship.
