= Cooper T61 =

Sports racing car

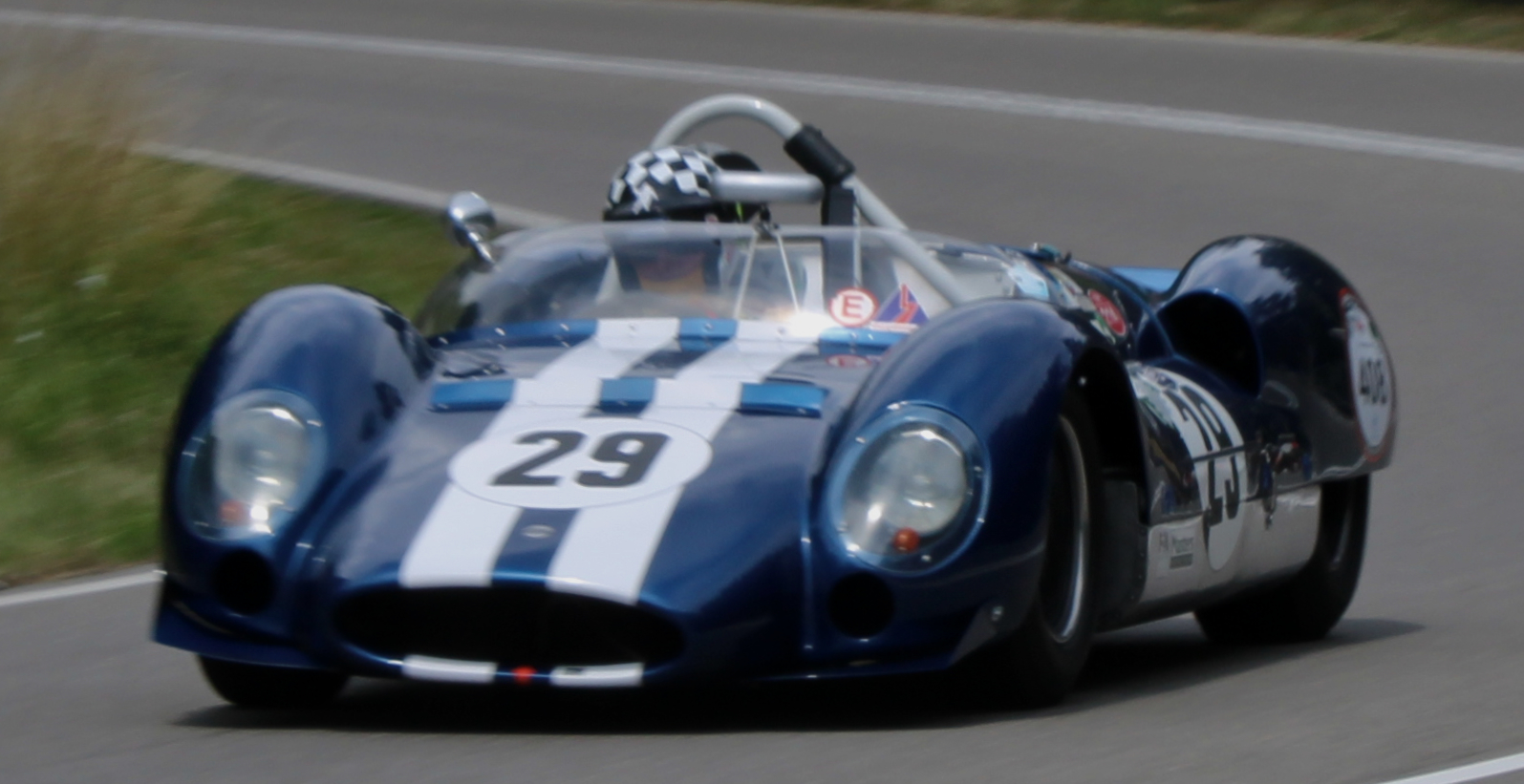
- Category: Group 4
- Constructor: Cooper
- Predecessor: Cooper T57

Technical specifications
- Chassis: Steel-reinforced tubular space frame covered in aluminum panels
- Axle track: Front: 52–55 in (1,300–1,400 mm); Rear: 53.5–55 in (1,360–1,400 mm)
- Wheelbase: 91–96.3 in (2,310–2,450 mm)
- Engine: Mid-engine, longitudinally mounted, 2.0–5.4 L (122–330 cu in), Coventry Climax/Ford/Chevrolet/Maserati, I4/V8, NA
- Transmission: Colotti T37/T41 or Halibrand-McKee 4-speed/5-speed manual
- Power: 240–430 hp (180–320 kW)
- Weight: 1,213–1,636 lb (550–742 kg)

Competition history

The Cooper T61 (Type 61), also known as the Cooper T61 Monaco, or the Cooper Monaco T61, is a sports racing car, designed, developed and built by British manufacturer Cooper, in 1961. It is the successor and evolution of the T57. Its motor racing career spanned 6 years (1962-1966, 1968); where it won a total of 16 races (plus 2 additional class wins), achieved 23 podium finishes, and clinched 3 pole positions. It was powered by a number of different engines, including a Coventry Climax four-cylinder engine, a Maserati V8 engine, a Ford FE engine, and a Chevrolet small-block engine.
