= 1958 USAC Road Racing Championship =

Seasons
- ← none 1959 →

The 1958 USAC Road Racing Championship season was the inaugural season of the USAC Road Racing Championship. The series was contested for sports cars at three rounds (Lime Rock, Marlboro, and Riverside), and Formula Libre at one round (Watkins Glen). It began September 7, 1958, and ended October 12, 1958, after four races. Dan Gurney won the season championship.

== Calendar ==
Rnd	Race	Length	Circuit	Location	Date
1	Lime Rock International Open	140 mi (230 km)	Lime Rock Park	Lakeville, Connecticut	September 7
2	Marlboro Grand Prix	76 mi (122 km)	Marlboro Motor Raceway	Upper Marlboro, Maryland	September 21
3	International Formula Libre Grand Prix	300 km (190 mi)	Watkins Glen International	Watkins Glen, New York	September 28
4	United States Grand Prix for Sports Cars	200 mi (320 km)	Riverside International Raceway	Riverside, California	October 12

== Season results ==
Rnd	Circuit	Winning team	Results
Rnd	Circuit	Winning driver	Results
1	Lime Rock	#49 Elisha Walker	Results
1	Lime Rock	(United States) George Constantine	Results
2	Marlboro	#49 Elisha Walker	Results
2	Marlboro	(United States) George Constantine	Results
3	Watkins Glen	#11 Jo Bonnier	Results
3	Watkins Glen	(Sweden) Jo Bonnier	Results
4	Riverside	#5 Reventhrow Automobile Incorporated	Results
4	Riverside	(United States) Chuck Daigh	Results
