= Phil Remington =

American motorsport engineer

Phil Remington (January 22, 1921 – February 9, 2013) was an American motorsports engineer.

== Early life ==
Remington was born in Santa Monica, California and was a pre-engineering student at Santa Monica Junior College. He initially was a component inspector at Northrop Aircraft. He joined the United States Army Air Forces during World War II by lying about his age because he was too young and by memorizing the vision charts because he was color blind. He served as a flight engineer on B-24 Liberators.

== Motorsports ==
After serving in the Army, he began working with friends who raced by building race cars, developing hydroplane parts and engine swap kits. In the late 1950s he became chief engineer to Lance Reventlow, building the Scarab sports racing car on Princeton Drive in what is now Marina del Rey, California.

When Reventlow was closing his shop, Carroll Shelby hired Remington as his chief engineer in Shelby's new shop on the same street. Shelby said his competition success was due to Remington. When Shelby American was split up, Remington remained with the Shelby Racing Components company in Torrance.

Remington moved to North Carolina in 1968 to run the Talladega Grand National stock car program at Holman and Moody. The team won the Daytona 500 that year.

Remington moved back to California and worked at Dan Gurney's All American Racers (AAR). There Remington worked on Can-Am, Formula 1, Formula 5000, Indy 500, Trans-Am, GTP and IMSA cars. He also worked on Alligator Motorcycles and did contract work for aerospace while there. In 2012 he built the oil and water coolers and engineered the suspension on the DeltaWing race car. Health concerns caused him to discontinue working full-time at AAR in 2012.

== Awards ==
Remington was inducted into the Motorsports Hall of Fame of America in 2019.

== In popular culture ==
Remington is portrayed by Ray McKinnon in Ford v Ferrari, a 2019 film about the rivalry between Ford and Ferrari at the 1966 Le Mans auto race.
