= Dan Gurney =

American racing driver, engineer and motorsport executive (1931–2018)

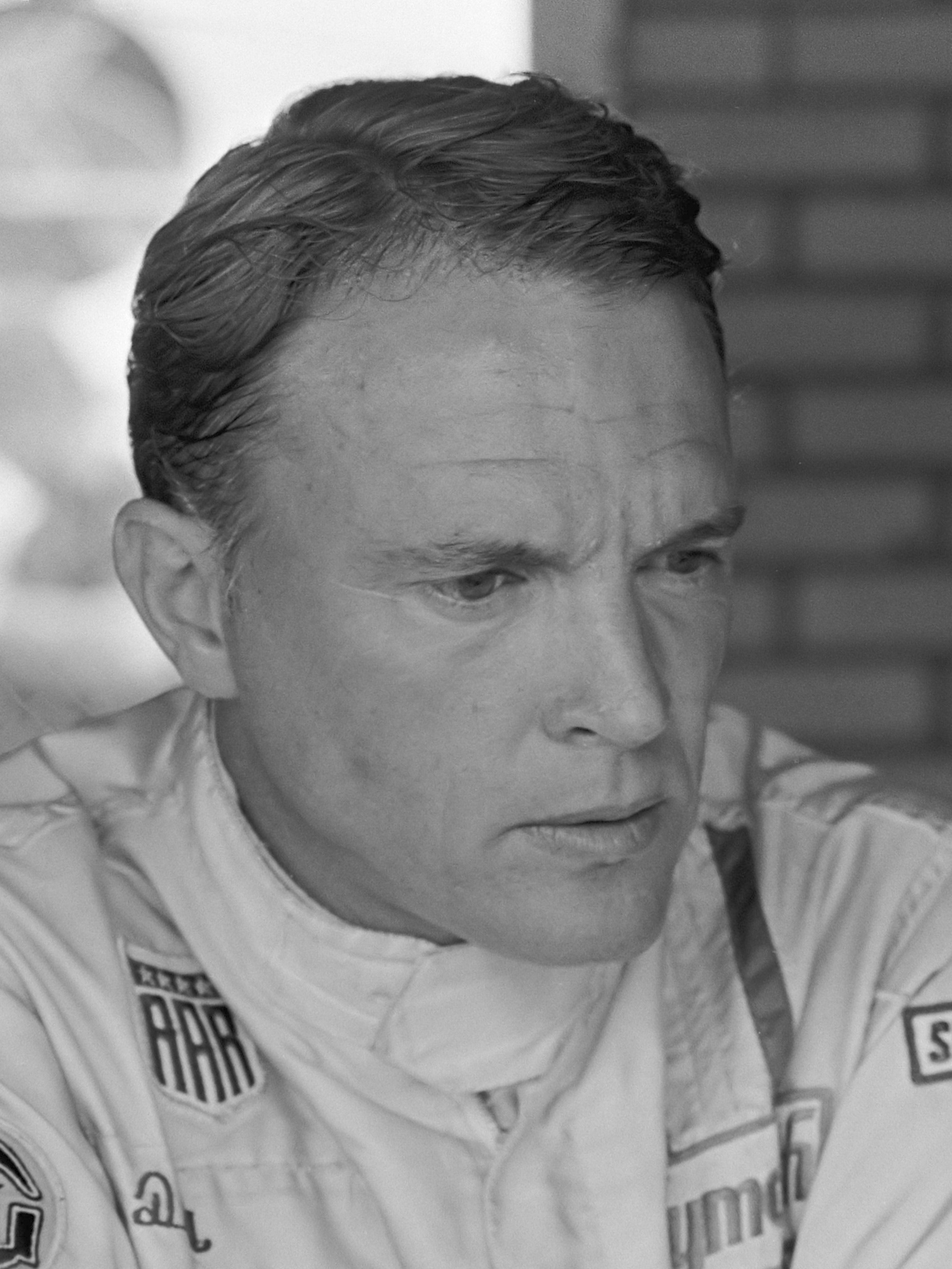
- Gurney at the 1970 Dutch Grand Prix
- Born: Daniel Sexton Gurney; April 13, 1931; Port Jefferson, New York, U.S.
- Died: January 14, 2018 (aged 86); Newport Beach, California, U.S.
- Spouse: Evi Butz (m. 1969)
- Children: 6, including Alex

Formula One World Championship career
- Nationality: (United States) American
- Active years: 1959–1968, 1970
- Team(s): Ferrari, BRM, Porsche, privateer Lotus, Brabham, Eagle, McLaren
- Entries: 87 (86 starts)
- Championships: 0
- Wins: 4
- Podiums: 19
- Career points: 133
- Pole positions: 3
- Fastest laps: 6
- First entry: 1959 French Grand Prix
- First win: 1962 French Grand Prix
- Last win: 1967 Belgian Grand Prix
- Last entry: 1970 British Grand Prix

Champ Car career
- 28 races run over 9 years
- Best finish: 4th (1969)
- First race: 1962 Indianapolis 500
- Last race: 1970 California 500 (Ontario)
- First win: 1967 Rex Mays 300 (Riverside)
- Last win: 1970 Golden Gate 150 (Sonoma)
Wins	Podiums	Poles
7	16	10

NASCAR Cup Series career
- 16 races run over 10 years
- Best finish: 77th (1962)
- First race: 1962 Daytona Qualifier #1 (Daytona)
- Last race: 1980 Winston Western 500 (Riverside)
- First win: 1963 Riverside 500 (Riverside)
- Last win: 1968 Motor Trend 500 (Riverside)
Wins	Top tens	Poles
5	10	3

24 Hours of Le Mans career
- Years: 1958–1967
- Teams: NART, Ferrari, Cunningham, Porsche, Serenissima, Shelby, Ford
- Best finish: 1st (1967)
- Class wins: 2 (1964, 1967)

Championship titles
- 1959; 1958: 12 Hours of Sebring; USAC Road Racing

Daniel Sexton Gurney (April 13, 1931 – January 14, 2018) was an American racing driver, engineer and motorsport executive, who competed in Formula One from 1959 to 1970. Widely regarded as one of the most influential figures in the history of motorsport, (Note: Per several sources:) Gurney won four Formula One Grands Prix across 11 seasons. In endurance racing, Gurney won the 24 Hours of Le Mans in 1967 with Ford, as well as the 12 Hours of Sebring in 1959 with Ferrari.

Born in Long Island, Gurney was the son of bass-baritone John R. Gurney and born into a family of engineers. Interested by California hot rod culture, Gurney built his first car aged 19 and became an amateur drag racer. After serving in the United States Army as an artillery mechanic during the Korean War, Gurney entered the 1957 Riverside Grand Prix, beating numerous established drivers including Phil Hill and attracting the attention of Luigi Chinetti, who organised his professional debut at the 24 Hours of Le Mans in 1958 with NART. His performance at Le Mans prompted Ferrari to sign Gurney for the 1959 season, making his Formula One debut at the French Grand Prix after winning the 12 Hours of Sebring with the team two months prior. After achieving two podiums in only four races at Ferrari, Gurney joined BRM in 1960. Following a non-classified championship finish with BRM, Gurney moved to Porsche, where he scored frequent podiums and finished fourth in the 1961 World Drivers' Championship. He took his maiden win at the 1962 French Grand Prix, which remains Porsche's only victory as a constructor in Formula One.

Gurney moved to Brabham in 1963 as their first-ever driver, taking multiple wins in three seasons at the team, including another fourth-placed championship finish in 1965. Alongside Carroll Shelby, Gurney had founded All American Racing in 1964, entering Formula One with Gurney at the wheel in 1966 under the chassis name Eagle. (Note: All American Racing entered Formula One under the team name Anglo American Racers, with chassis under the name Eagle.) Despite struggling for reliability with the Len Terry-designed Eagle T1, Gurney took his final victory at the 1967 Belgian Grand Prix, before leaving the sport at the end of 1968. He returned at three Grands Prix in 1970 for McLaren, following the death of Bruce McLaren. Gurney achieved four wins, three pole positions, six fastest laps and 19 podiums in Formula One, amongst winning the non-championship 1967 Race of Champions.

Outside of Formula One, Gurney entered ten editions of the 24 Hours of Le Mans from 1958 to 1967, winning the latter alongside A.J. Foyt in the Ford GT40 Mk IV. His celebration upon winning Le Mans—spraying champagne on the podium—has since become a custom throughout global motorsport. Gurney was a record five-time winner of the Winston Western 500 in the NASCAR Grand National Series and, in American open-wheel racing, was a six-time race winner in USAC Championship Car and twice runner-up in the Indianapolis 500 in 1968 and 1969. He was also a race-winner in the Canadian-American Challenge Cup, the Trans-Am Series and the British Saloon Car Championship. In aerodynamics, he is remembered for his invention of the Gurney flap, and became the first Formula One driver to wear a full-face helmet at the 1968 German Grand Prix. His All American Racers team won 78 official races, including the Indianapolis 500 and the 24 Hours of Daytona. Gurney was inducted into the International Motorsports Hall of Fame in 1990.

== Early life ==
Gurney was born to John R. "Jack" Gurney and Roma Sexton. Jack was discovered to have a beautiful voice after taking voice lessons in Paris and changed his career path to become lead basso with the Metropolitan Opera Company in New York, eventually retiring in 1947. Jack moved his family to Riverside, California, when Dan was a teenager and had just graduated from Manhasset High School. Young Dan quickly became caught up in the California hot rod culture. At age 19, he built and raced a car that went 138 miles per hour (mph) (222 kilometres per hour [km/h]) at the Bonneville Salt Flats. He later studied at Menlo Junior College, a feeder school for Stanford University. He then became an amateur drag racer and sports car racer. He served in the United States Army for two years as an artillery mechanic during the Korean War.

== Formula One career ==
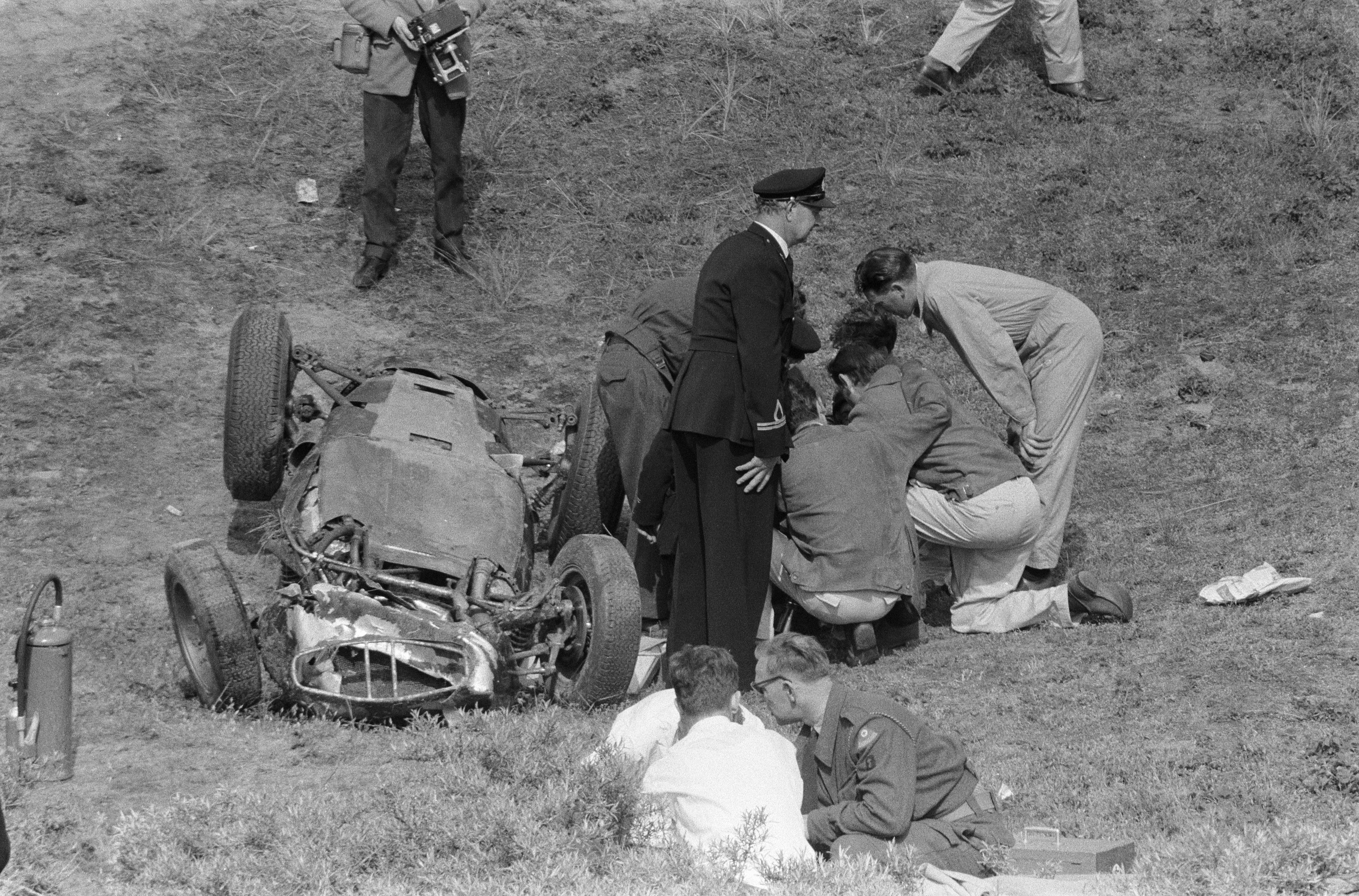
Gurney's car after his accident at the 1960 Dutch Grand Prix, which killed a young spectator

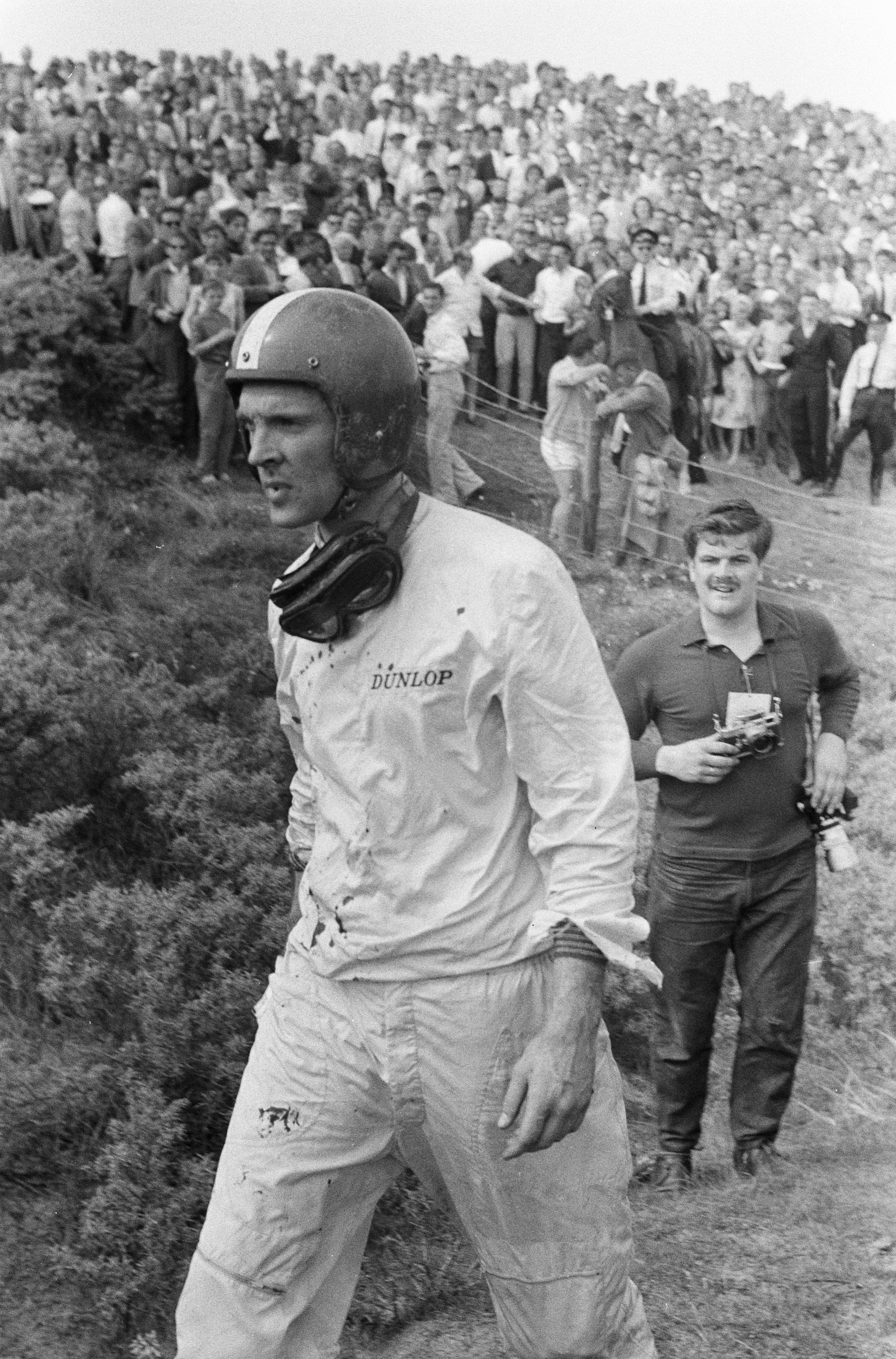
Gurney after his accident at the 1960 Dutch Grand Prix, a defining moment in his life

=== Driver ===
Gurney's first major break occurred in the fall of 1957 when he was invited to test Frank Arciero's Arciero Special. It was powered by a 4.2-litre reworked Maserati engine with Ferrari running gear, and a Sports Car Engineering Mistral body. This ill-handling brute of a car was very fast, but even top drivers like Carroll Shelby and Ken Miles had found it difficult to handle. He finished second in the inaugural Riverside Grand Prix (behind Shelby), beating established stars like Masten Gregory, Walt Hansgen and Phil Hill. This attracted the attention of famed Ferrari North American importer Luigi Chinetti, who arranged for a factory ride for the young driver at Le Mans in 1958. Gurney, teamed with fellow Californian Bruce Kessler, had worked the car up to fifth overall and handed over to Kessler, who was then caught up in an accident. This performance and others earned him a test run in a works Ferrari, and his Formula One career began with the team in 1959. In just four races that first year, he earned two podium finishes, but the team's strict management style did not suit him. In 1960, he had six non-finishes in seven races behind the wheel of a factory-prepared BRM. At the Dutch Grand Prix, at Zandvoort, a brake system failure on the BRM caused the most serious accident of his career, breaking his arm, killing a young spectator and instilling in him a longstanding distrust of engineers. The accident also caused him to make a change in his driving style that later paid dividends: his tendency to use his brakes more sparingly than his rivals meant that they lasted longer, especially in endurance races.

After rules changes came in effect for 1961, Formula 2 cars became Formula 1, which put the Porsche 718 former sportscar into the single-seater World Championship. As works drivers, Gurney teamed with Jo Bonnier for the first full season of the factory Porsche team, scoring three second places with the overweight underpowered car. He came very close to scoring a maiden victory at Reims, France, in 1961, but his reluctance to block Ferrari driver Giancarlo Baghetti (a move Gurney regarded as dangerous and unsportsmanlike, especially in open wheelers) allowed Baghetti in the faster Ferrari 156 to pass him at the finish line for the win. After Porsche introduced the better Porsche 804 car in 1962 with an 8-cylinder engine, and a German worker strike causing Porsche to remain absent from the Belgian round, Gurney broke through at the French Grand Prix at Rouen-Les-Essarts with his first World Championship victory – the only GP win for Porsche as an F1 constructor, and the only GP win with an air-cooled engine. One week later, he repeated the success in a non-Championship F1 race in front of Porsche's home crowd at Stuttgart's Solitude Racetrack. Due to the high costs of racing in F1, Porsche did not continue after the 1962 season. While with Porsche, Gurney met the factory's public relations executive named Evi Butz, and they married several years later.

Gurney was the first driver hired by Jack Brabham to drive with him for the Brabham Racing Organisation. Brabham scored the maiden victory for his car at the 1963 Solitude race, but Gurney took the team's first win in a championship race in 1964 at Rouen. In all, he earned two wins (in 1964) and ten podiums (including five consecutive in 1965) for Brabham before leaving to start his own team. With his victory in the Eagle-Weslake at the 1967 Belgian Grand Prix, Gurney earned a distinction as the only driver in history to score maiden Grand Prix victories for three different manufacturers: Porsche, Brabham and Anglo-American Racers.

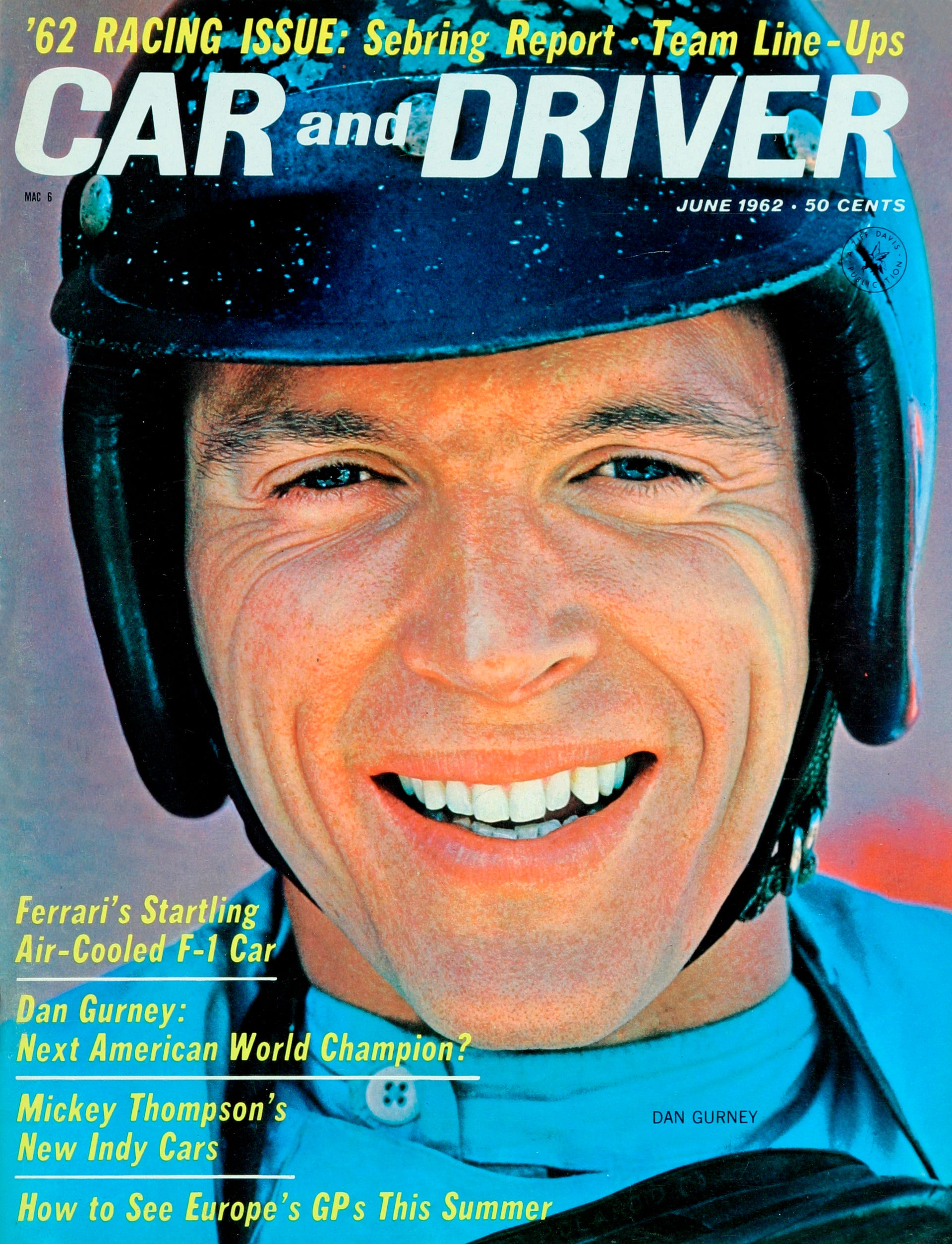
Gurney on the cover of the June 1962 issue of Car and Driver

Due to his popularity, Car and Driver magazine promoted the idea that Gurney run for President of the United States in 1964. This effort was abandoned only when it was "discovered" that he was too young to qualify as a candidate. The campaign was periodically resurrected (usually every four years) by his friends and fans.

Gurney developed a new kind of motorcycle called "Alligator", which featured an extremely low seat position. While Gurney did not achieve his goal of getting the design licensed for manufacture and sale by a major motorcycle manufacturer, the initial production run of 36 Alligator motorcycles quickly sold out and are now prized collector's items.

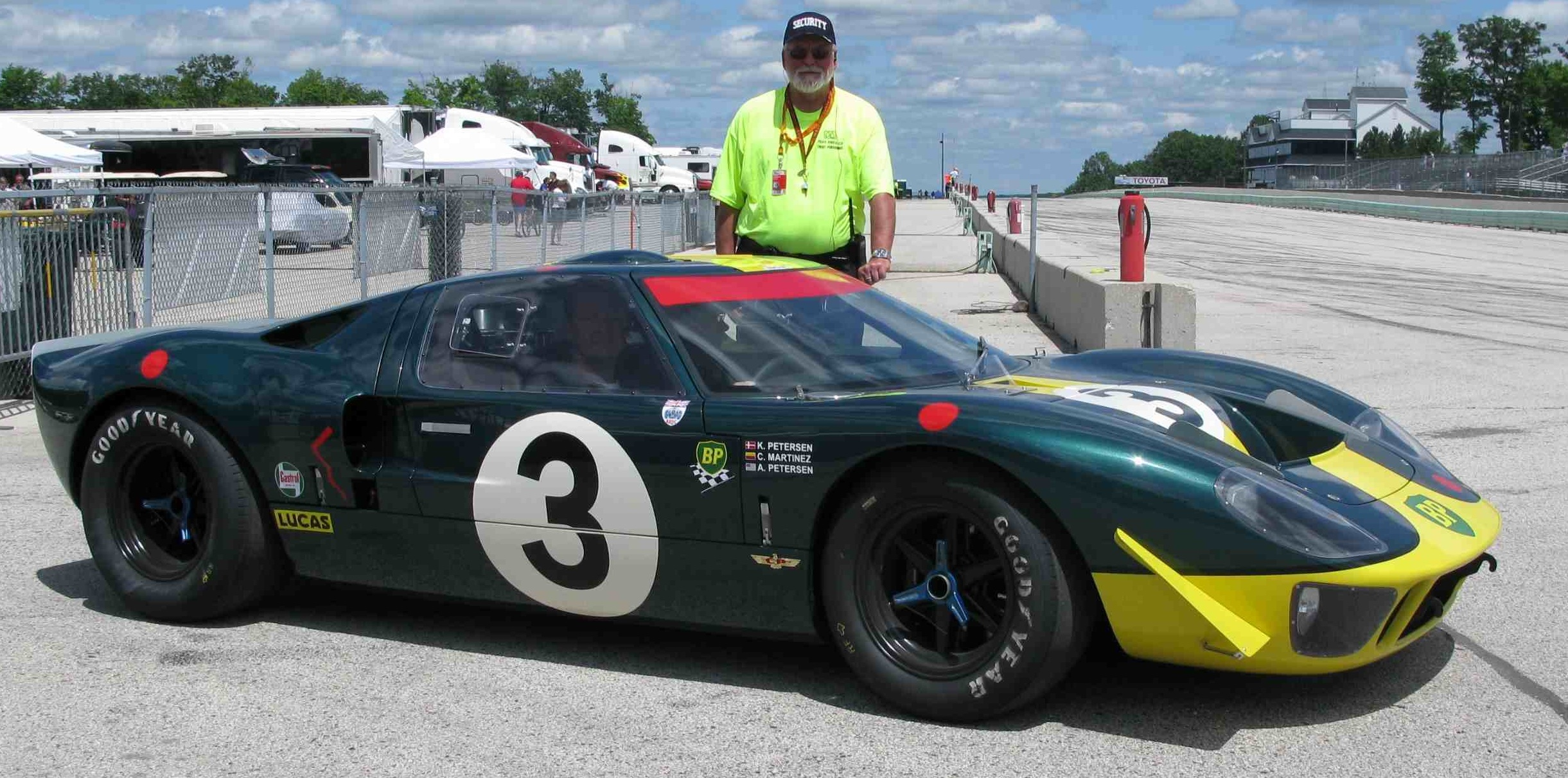
A GT40 with a Gurney Bubble

Gurney's tall height, unusual for a race driver, caused constant problems during his career. During the 1.5-litre era of Formula 1, Gurney's head and shoulders extended high into the windstream compared to his shorter competitors, giving him (he felt) an aerodynamic disadvantage in the tiny, underpowered cars. At nearly 6 feet 4 inches (1.93 m), Gurney struggled to fit into the tight Ford GT40 cockpit, so master fabricator Phil Remington installed a roof bubble over the driver's seat to allow space for Gurney's helmet—now known as a "Gurney bubble". In a fortunate error, the Italian coachbuilder who built the body for the 1964 Le Mans class-winning, closed-cockpit Cobra Daytona GT coupe driven by Gurney and Bob Bondurant mistakenly made the cockpit "greenhouse" two inches too tall — the only thing that permitted Gurney to fit in the car comfortably.

=== Manufacturer ===
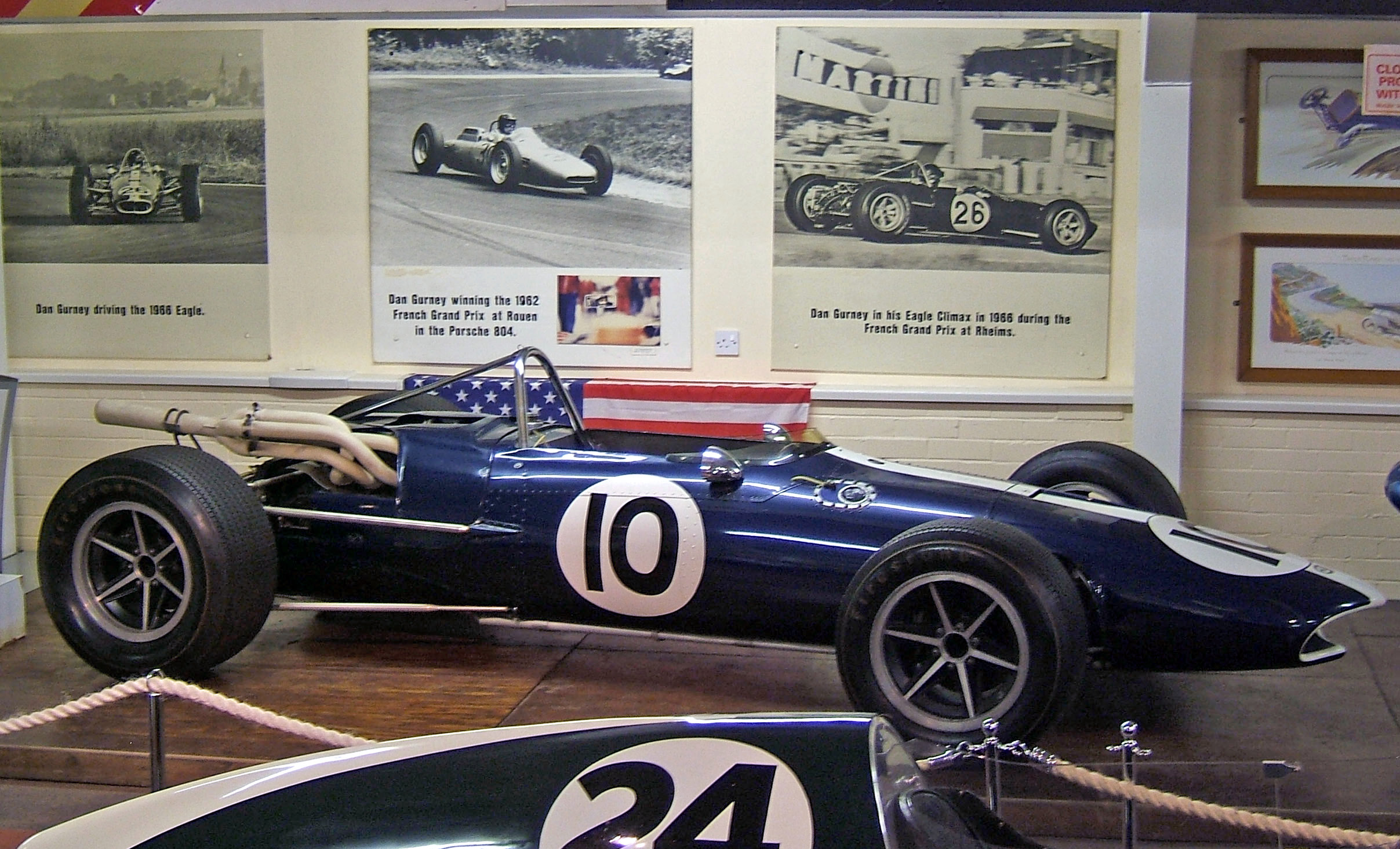
An Eagle Mk1. This car is the early, four-cylinder Climax-engined T1F, later replaced by the V12-engined T1G cars. The car wears the Imperial blue paint, the national racing colour of the United States.

In 1962, Gurney and Carroll Shelby began dreaming of building an American racing car to compete with the best European makes. Shelby convinced Goodyear, which wanted to challenge Firestone's domination of American racing at the time, to sponsor the team. Goodyear's president Victor Holt suggested the name, "All American Racers", and the team was formed in 1965. Gurney was not comfortable with the name at first, fearing it sounded somewhat jingoistic, but felt compelled to agree to his benefactor's suggestion.

Their initial focus was Indianapolis and Goodyear's battle with Firestone. Because Gurney's first love was road racing, especially in Europe, he wanted to win the Formula One World Championship while driving an American Grand Prix 'Eagle'. It has often been claimed that a Formula One car was built in Britain; in later interviews, Gurney was clear that the car was designed and built by crew members based in Santa Ana, California. Partnered with British engine maker Weslake, the Formula One effort was called "Anglo American Racers." The Weslake V12 engine was not ready for the 1966 Grand Prix season so the team used outdated four-cylinder, 2.7-litre Coventry-Climax engines for their first appearance in the second race of the year in Belgium. This was the race of the sudden torrential downpour captured in the feature film Grand Prix. Although Gurney completed the race in seventh place, he was unclassified. Gurney scored the team's first Championship points three weeks later by finishing fifth in the French Grand Prix at Reims.

The next season the team failed to finish any of the first three races, but on June 18, 1967, Gurney took a historic victory in the 1967 Belgian Grand Prix. Starting in the middle of the first row, Gurney initially followed Jim Clark's Lotus and the BRM of Jackie Stewart. A poor start left Gurney deep in the field at the end of the first lap. Throughout the race, Gurney's Weslake V-12 suffered a high-speed misfire, but he was able to continue racing. Jim Clark encountered problems on Lap 12 that dropped him down to ninth position. Having moved up to second spot, Gurney set the fastest lap of the race on Lap 19. Two laps later he and his Eagle took the lead and came home over a minute ahead of Stewart.

At this race, Gurney achieved the first "all-American" victory in a Grand Prix since Jimmy Murphy´s triumph with Duesenberg at the 1921 French Grand Prix. Excluding the Indianapolis 500, this is also the only win for a USA-built car as well as one of only two wins of an American-licensed constructor in Formula One. He also became one of only three drivers (along with Jack Brabham and Bruce McLaren) to win a Formula One race in a car of his own construction.

The win in Belgium came just a week after his surprise victory with A. J. Foyt at the 1967 24 Hours of Le Mans, where Gurney spontaneously began the now-familiar winner's tradition of spraying champagne from the podium to celebrate the unexpected win against the Ferraris and the other Ford GT40 teams. Gurney said later that he took great satisfaction in proving wrong the critics (including some members of the Ford team) who predicted the two great drivers, normally heated rivals, would break their car in an effort to show each other up.

Unfortunately, the victory in Belgium was the high point for AAR as engine problems continued to plague the Eagle. Despite the antiquated engine tooling used by the Weslake factory (dating from World War I), failures rarely stemmed from the engine design itself, but more often from unreliable peripheral systems like fuel pumps, fuel injection and the oil delivery system. He led the 1967 German Grand Prix at the Nürburgring when a driveshaft failed two laps from the end with a 42-second lead in hand. After a third-place finish in Canada that year, the car would finish only one more race. By the end of the 1968 season, Gurney was driving a McLaren-Ford. His last Formula One race was the 1970 British Grand Prix.

=== Legacy ===
Among American Formula One drivers, his 86 Grand Prix starts ranks third, and his total of four GP wins is second only to Mario Andretti. Perhaps the greatest tribute to Gurney's driving ability, however, was paid by the father of Scottish World Champion Jim Clark. The elder Clark took Gurney aside at his son's funeral in 1968 and confided that he was the only driver Clark had ever feared on the track. (Horton, 1999).

Gurney was particularly noted for an exceptionally fluid driving style. On rare occasions, as when his car fell behind with minor mechanical troubles and he felt he had nothing to lose, he would abandon his classic technique and adopt a more aggressive (and riskier) style. This circumstance produced what many observers consider the finest driving performance of his career, when a punctured tire put him nearly two laps down halfway through the 1967 Rex Mays 300 Indycar race at Riverside, California. He produced an inspired effort, made up the deficit and won the race with a dramatic last-lap pass of runner-up Bobby Unser.

The 2010 Monterey Motorsports Reunion (formerly the Monterey Historic Automobile Races) was held in honor of Gurney.

A 2016 academic paper reported a mathematical modeling study that assessed the relative influence of driver and machine. Gurney was ranked the 14th-best Formula One driver of all time.

== American Championship Car ==
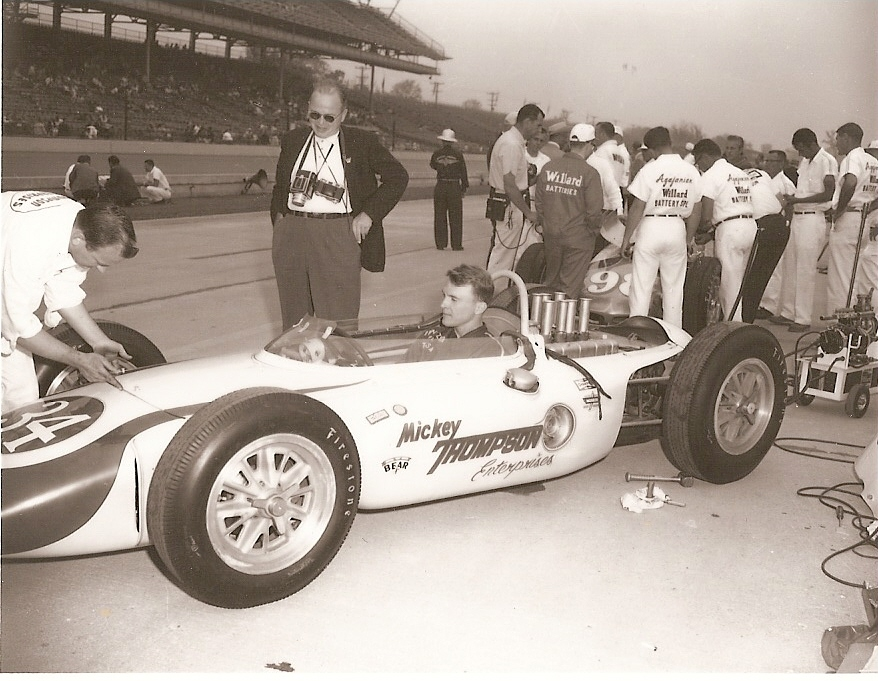
Gurney in 1962 Indy 500 car during practice. Designer John Crosthwaite working on car

While competing in Formula One, Gurney also raced each year in the Indianapolis 500 from 1962 to 1970. Gurney made his Indy début at the wheel of a space-frame, rear-engined car designed by John Crosthwaite and built by American hot-rodder Mickey Thompson. Despite a misfiring engine, Gurney ran comfortably in the top-ten until a transmission seal failed on the 92nd lap. The next year he drove for Team Lotus and finished seventh. He failed to finish in his next four appearances in the 500 mile race, but beginning in 1968 until his last attempt in 1970 he finished second, second, and third, respectively. In 1969, he did not race in Formula One, instead racing in the USAC Championship Car series and also in CanAm. He started a total of 28 Champ Car races, winning seven times among his eighteen top-tens. In 1969, he finished fourth in total points, despite starting only half the races of most top drivers (and would have finished second in the season standings to champion Mario Andretti if not for a driveshaft failure while leading comfortably with three laps remaining in the season finale at Riverside). In 1968, he finished seventh with only five starts.

== NASCAR / SCCA Trans-Am career ==
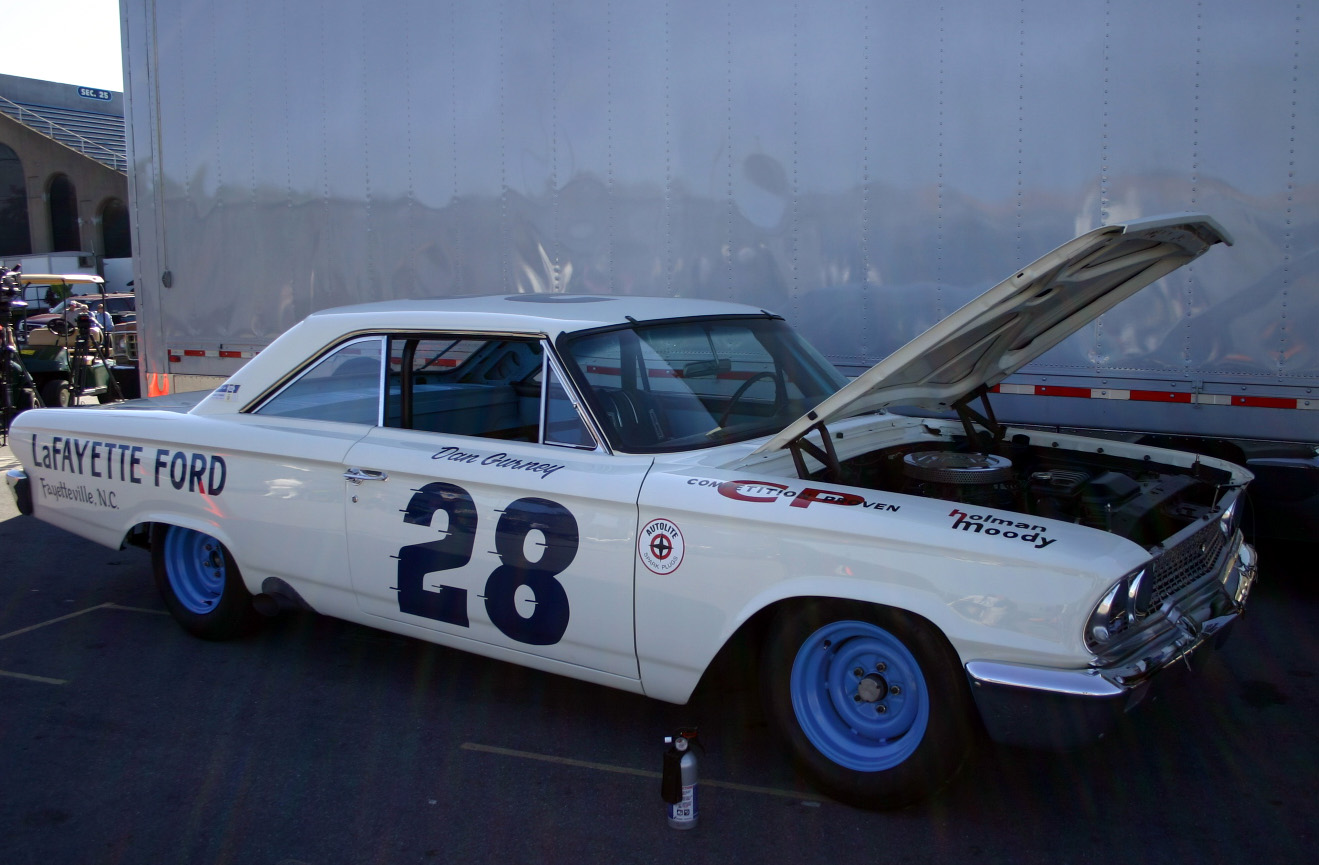
Gurney's 1963 Riverside 500 Ford Galaxie

Gurney's first career NASCAR start was in 1962. In 1963, he drove a Holman-Moody Ford to fifth place in the Daytona 500. Gurney was nearly unbeatable in a NASCAR Grand National car at Riverside International Raceway in California. Four of his five victories came with the famed Wood Brothers, in 1964, 1965, 1966 and 1968, in cars all numbered 121 (a simple graphic addition to the team's traditional "21"). The serial success of the Gurney/Wood Brothers combination did not sit well with NASCAR officials, so in 1967 Gurney signed to drive a Mercury for Bill Stroppe and legendary NASCAR crew chief Bud Moore. However, the 1967 Motor Trend 500 was won by Gurney's teammate, Parnelli Jones after Gurney retired with engine troubles. He also won the pole for the 1970 Riverside race in a Plymouth Superbird. Gurney is credited with numerous appearances in NASCAR Grand American stockcars, a pony car division that existed between 1968 and 1971, but these results came in races co-sanctioned with SCCA's Trans-Am, where Gurney competed regularly for Mercury, and later Plymouth.

At about the time Gurney began making occasional appearances in stock cars in the United States, he took a Chevrolet Impala to England and entered it in several "saloon car" (sedan) races. In a race at Silverstone in 1962, he led the local Jaguar drivers handily until a wheel broke. When he returned with the same car for a race three months later, the local club's technical inspectors disallowed his entry.

Gurney and his protege Swede Savage drove factory-sponsored, AAR built Plymouth Barracudas in the 1970 Trans-Am Series. Cutbacks at Chrysler forced Gurney to cut back to a one-car effort mid-season with Savage driving. In his swan song as a driver, in October 1970, Gurney returned for the season finale at his beloved Riverside, finishing fifth.

In 1980, Gurney came out of a ten-year retirement to help old friend Les Richter, the president of Riverside. (Gurney's adoption of the number that became most closely identified with his career, 48, was a nod to Richter's NFL number.) Gurney agreed to drive a second Rod Osterlund Chevrolet for one NASCAR race as teammate to 1979 rookie of the year Dale Earnhardt. For added publicity and supposedly as a condition of allowing Gurney to drive in the race after a ten-year layoff, Richter insisted that Gurney attend the racing school run by former teammate and friend Bob Bondurant (Gurney and Bondurant had shared the GT-class-winning Cobra Daytona coupe at Le Mans in 1964). After Gurney's refresher session, Richter called Bondurant and asked how Gurney had done. "He didn't need a refresher," Bondurant reportedly told Richter. "He was faster than me then, and he still is." Ticket sales surged upon the announcement of Gurney's return. In a Chevy MonteCarlo painted white with blue and carrying his famed number 48, Gurney qualified seventh and easily ran with the leaders. Displaying his usual fluid style, Gurney raced up to second place, and was running third when the input shaft in the transmission let go, something Dan later said he had never seen happen before or since.

== With Shelby-American Racing ==
Gurney was recruited by Carroll Shelby, who was mounting a Ford-powered challenge to Ferrari's dominance of the FIA 2+ liter GT class in the World Championship of Makes for the 1964 season. Shelby developed the Shelby Daytona Coupe, a derivative of the AC Cobra that had competed the previous year, with a lower drag coupe body. The team of Gurney and Bob Bondurant drove the Shelby Coupe to a GT class win, fourth overall, in the 1964 24 Hours of Le Mans and Gurney took it to another class win, third overall, in the RAC Tourist Trophy race. Ford's hopes for edging Ferrari for the Manufacturers' title at the 1000 km Monza season finale were dashed when the event was cancelled. In 1965 Ford teams won the Manufacturers' title for the GT class, although Gurney was only with Shelby for Le Mans and did not finish.

Gurney joined the Shelby-American campaign in the Sports Prototype class for 1966, which fielded the new 7 liter GT40 Mk II. Gurney's best finish that year was second place, teamed with Jerry Grant in a Mk II at the 24 Hours of Daytona. Between success with the new Mk II and the older GT40s, Ford secured the World Championship of Makes for sports cars, sealed by a resounding 1-2-3 finish at the 24 Hours of Le Mans, recalled in the 2019 film Ford v Ferrari, in which Gurney was portrayed by his son.

Gurney stayed with Shelby-American for their 1967 World Sportscar Championship campaign. Things were not going smoothly in development of Ford's next Prototype entry. After problems highlighted by the fatal accident of Ken Miles in testing the Mark III "J Car," another iteration was designed but it would not be built in time for the season opener at the 24 Hours of Daytona, where the team had a dismal showing with the Mk II. Shelby introduced the Mk IV at the 12 Hours of Sebring with a resounding win by Mario Andretti. The new cars were held in preparation for Le Mans, with Ford's hopes for a repeat championship resting on the GT40s and GT40-derived Mirages campaigned by other teams in the intervening races. A controversial decision to withhold points from the Mirage win at the Spa 1000 km event from Ford's season credit virtually killed hopes for a repeat championship, and gave Le Mans an all-or-nothing aspect for Ford. Four Mk IVs were entered, two with Shelby-American and two with Holman and Moody, Ford's unofficial NASCAR team.

Pre-race press chatter about the Mk IV's prospects, and in particular about Shelby's team of Gurney and Indy car driver A. J. Foyt, was negative: the Mk IV was too heavy and put too much demand on its brakes, it was structurally weak, it would be difficult to control, Foyt the oval racer was in over his head, Foyt would try to prove himself in the shadow of sportscar master Gurney, and so on. The static about Foyt was more stereotype than reality, as he had shown his road course mettle with a second-place showing at the grueling 12 Hours of Sebring in a Mk II earlier that year. As it turned out the race went like clockwork for Gurney and Foyt, establishing an early lead and a comfortable margin over the rival Ferraris, driving at a disciplined pace, and establishing a new record of 388 laps. On the podium, Gurney took the magnum of champagne and saw an opportunity for a playfully pointed statement towards journalists he saw crowding around. He shook the bottle and aimed the spritz at the naysayers. Soon he was giving everyone a shower, which became a podium tradition.

Ford's factory efforts for the World Sportscar Championship ended that year, as a new engine capacity limit of 3 liters for the Sports Prototype class made their entries ineligible and they had no engines that could be eligible and competitive. Shelby and Gurney independently turned their efforts to the SCCA Trans-Am series for 1968. Shelby and Gurney teamed up again in 1970, with Shelby hired for Gurney's All American Racing team.

== Cannonball Run ==
In November 1971, Gurney and co-driver Brock Yates won the first competitive running of the Cannonball Baker Sea-to-Shining-Sea Memorial Trophy Dash, known widely as the Cannonball Run, an unofficial, unsanctioned automobile race from New York City to Redondo Beach, California. Gurney and Yates made the run in 35 hours and 54 minutes in a stock 1971 Sunoco-blue Ferrari 365GTB/4 Daytona coupe capable of 175 mph (282 km/h). They averaged approximately 80 mph (130 km/h) over the 2,876 mi (4,628 km) distance, consuming 240 US gal (910 L) of gasoline. Gurney and Yates received no prize for winning; however, the winning car is now part of a private collection and valued at several million dollars.

== Full-time team owner ==
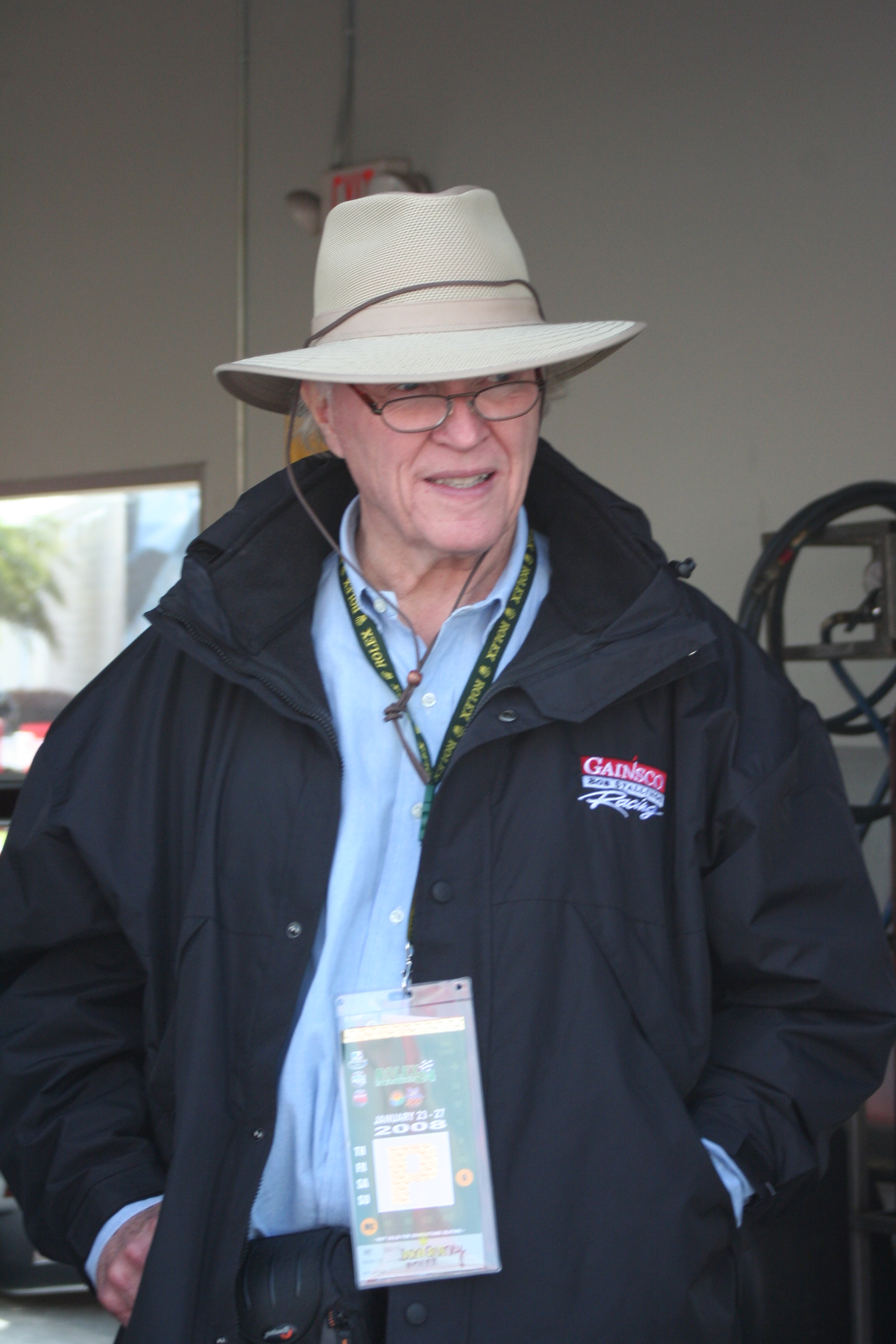
Gurney at the 2008 Rolex 24 Hours of Daytona

Upon his retirement from Formula One, Gurney devoted himself full-time to his role as car maker and team owner. He was the sole owner, Chairman and CEO of All American Racers from 1970 until his son, Justin, assumed the title of CEO in early 2011. The team won 78 races (including the Indianapolis 500, the 12 Hours of Sebring, and the 24 Hours of Daytona) and eight championships, while Gurney's Eagle race car customers also won three Indianapolis 500 races and three championships.

In 1978, Gurney wrote an open memo to other race car owners with what is now known as the "White Paper" in which Gurney called for a series controlled more by the owners or "actual participants" than under the USAC banner. After much debate, CART was formed with Gurney and other owners like Roger Penske, Pat Patrick, and Bob Fletcher. CART began its first full season of competition in March 1979 and thus the first split in open wheel racing began.

AAR withdrew from the CART series in 1986, but enjoyed tremendous success with Toyota in the IMSA GTP series, where in 1992 and 1993 Toyota Eagles won 17 consecutive races, back-to-back Drivers' and Manufacturers' Championships, and wins in the endurance classics of Daytona and Sebring.

The team returned to CART as the factory Toyota team in 1996, but left again after the 1999 season when Goodyear withdrew from the series and Toyota ended their relationship with the team. In 2000, Dan campaigned a Toyota Atlantic car for his son, Alex Gurney, under the AAR banner.

== Death ==
In 2018, Gurney died of complications from pneumonia; he was 86 years old. All American Racers announced the news on its website: "With one last smile on his handsome face, Dan drove off into the unknown just before noon today, January 14, 2018. In deepest sorrow, with gratitude in our hearts for the love and joy you have given us during your time on this earth, we say 'Godspeed.'"

Gurney was survived by his wife Evi, six children, and eight grandchildren. As per his final wishes, his memorial service and funeral were private.

== Awards and honors ==
- He was inducted into the Indianapolis Motor Speedway Hall of Fame in 1988.
- He was inducted into the International Motorsports Hall of Fame in 1990.
- He was inducted into the Motorsports Hall of Fame of America in 1991.
- He was inducted into the West Coast Stock Car Hall of Fame in 2003.
- He was inducted into the USAC Hall of Fame in 2022.
- He was inducted into the Trans-Am Series Hall of Fame in 2025.

== Racing record ==
=== Racing career summary ===
Season	Series	Team	Races	Wins	Poles	F/Laps	Podiums	Points	Position
1958	24 Hours of Le Mans – S 3.0	North American Racing Team	1	0	0	0	0	—N/a	DNF
1958	World Sportscar Championship	North American Racing Team	1	0	0	0	0	—N/a	—N/a
1958	USAC Road Racing Championship	—N/a	2	0	1	0	2	616	**1st**
1958	USAC Stock Car Series	—N/a	1	0	0	0	0	0	NC
1959	Formula One	Scuderia Ferrari	7	0	0	0	2	13	7th
1959	24 Hours of Le Mans – S 3.0	Scuderia Ferrari	1	0	0	0	0	—N/a	DNF
1959	World Sportscar Championship	Scuderia Ferrari	5	1	0	0	1	—N/a	—N/a
1959	USAC Road Racing Championship	—N/a	1	1	1	0	0	0	NC
1960	Formula One	Owen Racing Organisation	7	0	0	0	0	0	NC
1960	Formula Two	—N/a	1	0	0	0	0	0	NC
1960	24 Hours of Le Mans – S 3.0	B.S. Cunningham	1	0	0	1	0	—N/a	DNF
1960	World Sportcar Championship	Camoradi International	4	1	0	1	1	—N/a	—N/a
1960	USAC Road Racing Championship	—N/a	2	0	1	0	0	0	NC
1961	Formula One	Porsche System Engineering	8	0	0	0	3	21	4th
1961	British Saloon Car Championship	—N/a	1	0	1	0	0	0	NC
1961	24 Hours of Le Mans – S 2.0	Porsche KG	1	0	0	0	0	—N/a	DNF
1961	World Sportscar Championship	Porsche KG	4	0	0	0	1	—N/a	—N/a
1961	USAC Road Racing Championship	—N/a	3	0	1	1	2	?	?
1962	Formula One	Porsche System Engineering	7	1	1	0	2	15	5th
1962	Formula One	Autosport Team Wolfgang Seidel	1	0	0	0	0	0	5th
1962	USAC Championship Car	Harvey Aluminium	1	0	0	0	0	0	NC
1962	24 Hours of Le Mans – E 3.0	Scuderia SSS Republica di Venezia	1	0	0	0	0	—N/a	DNF
1962	World Sportscar Championship	Scuderia SSS Republica di Venezia	x	x	x	x	x	—N/a	—N/a
1962	NASCAR Grand National Series	Holman-Moody	2	0	0	0	0	472	77th
1962	USAC Road Racing Championship	—N/a	9	5	1	1	6	?	**2nd**
1962	USAC Stock Car Series	—N/a	2	0	0	0	0	0	NC
1962	CASC Canadian Sports Car Championship	—N/a	2	0	1	2	0	?	?
1963	Formula One	Brabham Racing Organisation	10	0	0	3	1	19	5th
1963	USAC Championship Car	Team Lotus	3	0	0	0	1	580	12th
1963	British Saloon Car Championship	Alan Brown Racing Ltd	1	1	1	1	1	9	22nd
1963	24 Hours of Le Mans – P +3.0	North American Racing Team	1	0	0	0	0	—N/a	DNF
1963	World Sportscar Championship	Shelby American	4	1	?	?	?	—N/a	—N/a
1963	NASCAR Grand National Series	Holman-Moody	3	1	0	0	1	—N/a	—N/a
1963	USAC Stock Car Series	—N/a	1	0	0	0	0	0	NC
1963	CASC Canadian Sports Car Championship	—N/a	1	0	0	0	1	?	?
1964	Formula One	Brabham Racing Organisation	10	2	2	2	2	19	6th
1964	USAC Championship Car	Team Lotus	1	0	0	0	0	0	NC
1964	British Saloon Car Championship	Alan Brown Racing Ltd	1	0	0	0	1	6	6th
1964	24 Hours of Le Mans – GT +3.0	Shelby American	1	1	0	0	1	—N/a	**1st**
1964	World Sportscar Championship	Shelby American	6	0	0	0	1	—N/a	—N/a
1964	NASCAR Grand National Series	Wood Brothers Racing	4	1	0	0	1	—N/a	—N/a
1964	CASC Canadian Sports Car Championship	—N/a	1	0	1	0	0	?	?
1965	Formula One	Brabham Racing Organisation	9	0	0	1	5	25	4th
1965	USAC Championship Car	All American Racers	3	0	0	0	1	230	26th
1965	24 Hours of Le Mans – GT 5.0	Shelby American	1	0	0	0	0	—N/a	DNF
1965	World Sportscar Championship	Shelby American	x	x	x	x	x	—N/a	—N/a
1965	NASCAR Grand National Series	Wood Brothers Racing	1	1	0	0	1	—N/a	—N/a
1965	British Sports Car Championship	All American Racers	1	0	0	0	0	—N/a	—N/a
1966	Formula One	Anglo American Racers	8	0	0	0	0	4	12th
1966	USAC Championship Car	All American Racers	1	0	0	0	0	0	NC
1966	24 Hours of Le Mans	Shelby American	1	0	1	1	0	—N/a	DNF
1966	World Sportscar Championship	Shelby American	x	x	x	x	x	—N/a	—N/a
1966	NASCAR Grand National Series	Wood Brothers Racing	1	1	0	0	1	—N/a	—N/a
1966	Canadian-American Challenge Cup	All American Racers	5	1	2	2	1	9	7th
1967	Formula One	Anglo American Racers	11	1	0	2	2	13	8th
1967	USAC Championship Car	All American Racers	2	1	1	?	1	0	NC
1967	24 Hours of Le Mans	Ford Motor Company	1	1	0	0	1	—N/a	**1st**
1967	World Sportscar Championship	Ford Motor Company	x	x	x	x	x	—N/a	—N/a
1967	NASCAR Grand National Series	Stroppe Motorsports	1	0	0	0	0	—N/a	—N/a
1967	Canadian-American Challenge Cup	All American Racers	6	0	1	0	0	0	NC
1967	Trans-American Championship – +2.0	Bud Moore Engineering	4	1	1	0	2	—N/a	—N/a
1968	Formula One	Anglo American Racers	8	0	0	0	0	3	21st
1968	Formula One	Brabham Racing Organisation	1	0	0	0	0	0	21st
1968	USAC Championship Car	All American Racers	5	3	4	?	4	1,800	7th
1968	NASCAR Grand National Series	Wood Brothers Racing	1	1	1	0	1	—N/a	—N/a
1968	Canadian-American Challenge Cup	All American Racers	5	0	0	0	0	1	15th
1968	Trans-American Championship – +2.0	Shelby American	5	0	0	0	0	—N/a	—N/a
1969	USAC Championship Car	All American Racers	9	2	5	?	7	2,280	4th
1969	NASCAR Grand National Series	Wood Brothers Racing	1	0	0	0	0	—N/a	—N/a
1969	Canadian-American Challenge Cup	All American Racers	3	0	0	0	0	10	11th
1969	Canadian-American Challenge Cup	McLaren Cars	1	0	0	0	1	12	11th
1969	Trans-American Championship – +2.0	Shelby American	2	0	0	0	1	—N/a	—N/a
1970	Formula One	Bruce McLaren Motor Racing	3	0	0	0	0	1	24th
1970	USAC Championship Car	All American Racers	3	1	0	?	2	1,000	11th
1970	NASCAR Grand National Series	Petty Enterprises	1	0	1	0	0	—N/a	—N/a
1970	Canadian-American Challenge Cup	Bruce McLaren Racing	3	2	2	1	2	42	7th
1970	Trans-American Championship – +2.0	All American Racers	4	0	0	0	0	—N/a	—N/a
1978	Macau Grand Prix – Race of Giants	—N/a	1	0	0	0	0	—N/a	4th
1980	NASCAR Winston Cup Series	Osterlund Motorsports	1	0	0	0	0	—N/a	—N/a

=== Complete Formula One World Championship results ===
(key) (Races in bold indicate pole position; races in italics indicate fastest lap)

Year	Entrant	Chassis	Engine	1	2	3	4	5	6	7	8	9	10	11	12	13	WDC	Pts
1959	Scuderia Ferrari	Ferrari Dino 246	Ferrari 155 2.4 V6	MON	500	NED	FRA; Ret	GBR	GER; 2	POR; 3	ITA; 4	USA					7th	13
1960	Owen Racing Organisation	BRM P48	BRM P25 2.5 L4	ARG	MON; NC	500	NED; Ret	BEL; Ret	FRA; Ret	GBR; 10	POR; Ret	ITA	USA; Ret				NC	0
1961	Porsche System Engineering	Porsche 718	Porsche 547/3 1.5 F4	MON; 5		BEL; 6	FRA; 2	GBR; 7	GER; 7	ITA; 2	USA; 2						4th	21
1961	Porsche System Engineering	Porsche 787	Porsche 547/3 1.5 F4		NED; 10												4th	21
1962	Porsche System Engineering	Porsche 804	Porsche 753 1.5 F8	NED; Ret	MON; Ret		FRA; 1	GBR; 9	**GER**; 3	ITA; Ret	USA; 5	RSA					5th	15
1962	Autosport Team Wolfgang Seidel	Lotus 24	BRM P56 1.5 V8			BEL; DNS											5th	15
1963	Brabham Racing Organisation	Brabham BT7	Climax FWMV 1.5 V8	MON; Ret	BEL; 3	NED; 2	FRA; 5	GBR; Ret	GER; Ret	ITA; 14	USA; Ret	MEX; 6	RSA; 2				5th	19
1964	Brabham Racing Organisation	Brabham BT7	Climax FWMV 1.5 V8	MON; Ret	**NED**; Ret	**BEL**; 6	FRA; 1	GBR; 13	GER; 10	AUT; Ret	ITA; 10	USA; Ret	MEX; 1				6th	19
1965	Brabham Racing Organisation	Brabham BT11	Climax FWMV 1.5 V8	RSA; Ret	MON	BEL; 10	FRA; Ret	GBR; 6	NED; 3	GER; 3	ITA; 3	USA; 2	MEX; 2				4th	25
1966	Anglo American Racers	Eagle T1F	Climax FPF 2.8 L4	MON	BEL; NC	FRA; 5	GBR; Ret	NED; Ret	GER; 7			MEX; 5					12th	4
1966	Anglo American Racers	Eagle T1G	Weslake 58 3.0 V12							ITA; Ret	USA; Ret						12th	4
1967	Anglo American Racers	Eagle T1F	Climax FPF 2.8 L4	RSA; Ret													8th	13
1967	Anglo American Racers	Eagle T1G	Weslake 58 3.0 V12		MON; Ret	NED; Ret	BEL; 1	FRA; Ret	GBR; Ret	GER; Ret	CAN; 3	ITA; Ret	USA; Ret	MEX; Ret			8th	13
1968	Anglo American Racers	Eagle T1G	Weslake 58 3.0 V12	RSA; Ret	ESP	MON; Ret	BEL		FRA	GBR; Ret	GER; 9	ITA; Ret					21st	3
1968	Anglo American Racers	McLaren M7A	Ford Cosworth DFV 3.0 V8										CAN; Ret	USA; 4	MEX; Ret		21st	3
1968	Brabham Racing Organisation	Brabham BT24	Repco 740 3.0 V8					NED; Ret									21st	3
1970	Bruce McLaren Motor Racing	McLaren M14A	Ford Cosworth DFV 3.0 V8	RSA	ESP	MON	BEL	NED; Ret	FRA; 6	GBR; Ret	GER	AUT	ITA	CAN	USA	MEX	24th	1

==== Non-championship results ====
(key) (Races in bold indicate pole position) (Races in italics indicate fastest lap)

Year	Entrant	Chassis	Engine	1	2	3	4	5	6	7	8	9	10	11	12	13	14	15	16	17	18	19	20	21
1960	Owen Racing Organisation	BRM P48	BRM P25 2.5 L4	GLV; Ret	INT; Ret		LOM; DNS	OUL; 6																
1960	Yeoman Credit Racing Team	Cooper T51	Climax FPF 2.5 L4			SIL; 7																		
1961	Porsche System Engineering	Porsche 718	Porsche 547/3 1.5 F4	LOM	GLV	PAU	BRX; Ret	VIE		**SYR**; 2	NAP	LON		SOL; 3	KAN	DAN	MOD; 3	FLG	OUL; DNA	LEW	VAL	RAN	NAT	RSA
1961	Louise Bryden-Brown	Lotus 18	Climax FPF 1.5 L4						AIN; 14				SIL; 5											
1962	Porsche System Engineering	Porsche 804	Porsche 753 1.5 F8	CAP	BRX	LOM	LAV	GLV	PAU	AIN	INT	NAP	MAL	CLP	RMS	SOL; 1	KAN	MED	DAN	OUL	MEX; DNA	RAN	NAT	
1963	Brabham Racing Organisation	Brabham BT7	Climax FWMV 1.5 V8	LOM	GLV	PAU	IMO	SYR	AIN	INT; DNA	ROM	SOL	KAN; DNA	MED	AUT	OUL; Ret	RAN							
1964	Brabham Racing Organisation	Brabham BT7	Climax FWMV 1.5 V8	DMT	NWT	SYR	AIN; Ret	**INT**; Ret	SOL; DNA	MED	RAN													
1965	Brabham Racing Organisation	Brabham BT11	Climax FWMV 1.5 V8	ROC; Ret	SYR	SMT; 9	INT	MED	RAN															
1967	Anglo American Racers	Eagle T1G	Weslake 58 3.0 V12	**ROC**; 1	SPC	INT	SYR	OUL	ESP															

=== Complete 24 Hours of Le Mans results ===
Year	Team	Co-Drivers	Car	Class	Laps	Pos.	Class Pos.
1958	(United States) North American Racing Team	(United States) Bruce Kessler	Ferrari 250 TR	S 3.0	64	DNF	DNF
1959	(Italy) Scuderia Ferrari	(France) Jean Behra	Ferrari 250 TR/59	S 3.0	129	DNF	DNF
1960	(United States) B.S. Cunningham	(United States) Walt Hansgen	Jaguar E2A	S 3.0	89	DNF	DNF
1961	(West Germany) Porsche System Engineering	(Sweden) Jo Bonnier	Porsche 718/4 RS Coupe	S 2.0	262	DNF	DNF
1962	(Italy) Scuderia SSS Republica di Venezia	(Sweden) Jo Bonnier	Ferrari 250 TRI/61	E 3.0	30	DNF	DNF
1963	(United States) North American Racing Team	(United States) Jim Hall	Ferrari 330 LMB	P +3.0	126	DNF	DNF
1964	(United States) Shelby-American Inc.	(United States) Bob Bondurant	Shelby Cobra Daytona	GT +3.0	334	4th	**1st**
1965	(United States) Shelby American	(United States) Jerry Grant	AC Cobra Daytona Coupé	GT; 5.0	204	DNF	DNF
1966	(United States) Shelby American	(United States) Jerry Grant	Ford GT40 Mk.II	P +5.0	257	DNF	DNF
1967	(United States) Ford Motor Company (United States) Shelby-American Inc.	(United States) A. J. Foyt	Ford Mk IV	P +5.0	388	**1st**	**1st**

=== Complete British Saloon Car Championship results ===
(key) (Races in bold indicate pole position; races in italics indicate fastest lap.)

Year	Team	Car	Class	1	2	3	4	5	6	7	8	9	10	11	Pos.	Pts	Class
1961	Dan Gurney	Chevrolet Impala	D	SNE	GOO	AIN	**SIL**; Ret	CRY	SIL; DNS	BRH	OUL	SNE			NC	0	NC
1963	Alan Brown Racing Ltd	Ford Galaxie	D	SNE	OUL	GOO	AIN	SIL	CRY	SIL	BRH	BRH	**OUL** ovr:1 cls:1	SNE	22nd	9	6th
1964	Alan Brown Racing Ltd	Ford Galaxie	D	SNE	GOO	OUL	AIN	SIL ovr:2 cls:2	CRY	BRH	OUL				17th	6	6th

=== Complete NASCAR results ===
(key) (Bold – Pole position awarded by qualifying time. Italics – Pole position earned by points standings or practice time. * – Most laps led.)

==== Grand National Series ====
NASCAR Grand National Series results
Year	Team	No.	Make	1	2	3	4	5	6	7	8	9	10	11	12	13	14	15	16	17	18	19	20	21	22	23	24	25	26	27	28	29	30	31	32	33	34	35	36	37	38	39	40	41	42	43	44	45	46	47	48	49	50	51	52	53	54	55	56	57	58	59	60	61	62	NGNC	Pts	Ref
1962	Holman-Moody	0	Ford	CON	AWS	DAY; 4	DAY	DAY; 27	CON	AWS	SVH	HBO	RCH	CLB	NWS	GPS	MBS	MAR	BGS	BRI	RCH	HCY	CON	DAR	PIF	CLT	ATL	BGS	AUG	RCH	SBO	DAY	CLB	ASH	GPS	AUG	SVH	MBS	BRI	CHT	NSV	HUN	AWS	STR	BGS	PIF	VAL	DAR	HCY	RCH	DTS	AUG	MAR	NWS	CLT	ATL										77th	472	
1963	Holman-Moody	28	Ford	BIR	GGS	THS	RSD; 1*																																																											NA	-	
1963	Holman-Moody	0	Ford					DAY; 5	DAY	DAY; 5	PIF	AWS	HBO	ATL	HCY	BRI	AUG	RCH	GPS	SBO	BGS	MAR	NWS	CLB	THS	DAR	ODS	RCH	CLT	BIR	ATL	DAY	MBS	SVH	DTS	BGS	ASH	OBS	BRR	BRI	GPS	NSV	CLB	AWS	PIF	BGS	ONA	DAR	HCY	RCH	MAR	DTS	NWS	THS	CLT	SBO	HBO									NA	-	
1963	Wood Brothers Racing	121	Ford																																																							**RSD**; QL^{†}								NA	-	
1964	Wood Brothers Racing	121	Ford	CON	AUG	JSP	SVH	RSD; 1*	DAY																																																									NA	-	
1964	Wood Brothers Racing	12	Ford							DAY; 10	DAY; 14	RCH	BRI	GPS	BGS	ATL; 36	AWS	HBO	PIF	CLB	NWS	MAR	SVH	DAR	LGY	HCY	SBO	CLT	GPS	ASH	ATL	CON	NSV	CHT	BIR	VAL	PIF	DAY	ODS	OBS	BRR	ISP	GLN	LIN	BRI	NSV	MBS	AWS	DTS	ONA	CLB	BGS	STR	DAR	HCY	RCH	ODS	HBO	MAR	SVH	NWS	CLT	HAR	AUG	JAC	NA	-	
1965	Wood Brothers Racing	121	Ford	RSD; 1*	DAY	DAY	DAY	PIF	ASW	RCH	HBO	ATL	GPS	NWS	MAR	CLB	BRI	DAR	LGY	BGS	HCY	CLT	CCF	ASH	HAR	NSV	BIR	ATL	GPS	MBS	VAL	DAY	ODS	OBS	ISP	GLN	BRI	NSV	CCF	AWS	SMR	PIF	AUG	CLB	DTS	BLV	BGS	DAR	HCY	LIN	ODS	RCH	MAR	NWS	CLT	HBO	CAR	DTS								NA	-	
1966	Wood Brothers Racing	121	Ford	AUG	RSD; 1*	DAY	DAY	DAY	CAR	BRI	ATL	HCY	CLB	GPS	BGS	NWS	MAR	DAR	LGY	MGR	MON	RCH	CLT	DTS	ASH	PIF	SMR	AWS	BLV	GPS	DAY	ODS	BRR	OXF	FON	ISP	BRI	SMR	NSV	ATL	CLB	AWS	BLV	BGS	DAR	HCY	RCH	HBO	MAR	NWS	CLT	CAR														NA	-	
1967	Stroppe Motorsports	16	Mercury	AUG	RSD; 14	DAY	DAY	DAY	AWS	BRI	GPS	BGS	ATL	CLB	HCY	NWS	MAR	SVH	RCH	DAR	BLV	LGY	CLT	ASH	MGR	SMR	BIR	CAR	GPS	MGY	DAY	TRN	OXF	FDA	ISP	BRI	SMR	NSV	ATL	BGS	CLB	SVH	DAR	HCY	RCH	BLV	HBO	MAR	NWS	CLT	CAR	AWS														NA	-	
1968	Wood Brothers Racing	121	Ford	MGR	MGY	**RSD**; 1*	DAY	BRI	RCH	ATL	HCY	GPS	CLB	NWS	MAR	AUG	AWS	DAR	BLV	LGY	CLT	ASH	MGR	SMR	BIR	CAR	GPS	DAY	ISP	OXF	FDA	TRN	BRI	SMR	NSV	ATL	CLB	BGS	AWS	SBO	LGY	DAR	HCY	RCH	BLV	HBO	MAR	NWS	AUG	CLT	CAR	JFC														NA	-	
1969	Wood Brothers Racing	121	Mercury	MGR	MGY	RSD; 26	DAY	DAY	DAY	CAR	AUG	BRI	ATL	CLB	HCY	GPS	RCH	NWS	MAR	AWS	DAR	BLV	LGY	CLT	MGR	SMR	MCH	KPT	GPS	NCF	DAY	DOV	TPN	TRN	BLV	BRI	NSV	SMR	ATL	MCH	SBO	BGS	AWS	DAR	HCY	RCH	TAL	CLB	MAR	NWS	CLT	SVH	AUG	CAR	JFC	MGR	TWS									NA	-	
1970	Petty Enterprises	42	Plymouth	**RSD**; 6	DAY	DAY	DAY	RCH	CAR	SVH	ATL	BRI	TAL	NWS	CLB	DAR	BLV	LGY	CLT	SMR	MAR	MCH	RSD	HCY	KPT	GPS	DAY	AST	TPN	TRN	BRI	SMR	NSV	ATL	CLB	ONA	MCH	TAL	BGS	SBO	DAR	HCY	RCH	DOV	NCF	NWS	CLT	MAR	MGR	CAR	LGY															NA	-	
^{†} – Qualified but replaced by Marvin Panch.

==== Winston Cup Series ====
NASCAR Winston Cup Series results
Year	Team	No.	Make	1	2	3	4	5	6	7	8	9	10	11	12	13	14	15	16	17	18	19	20	21	22	23	24	25	26	27	28	29	30	31	NWCC	Pts	Ref
1980	Osterlund Racing	48	Chevrolet	RSD; 28	DAY	RCH	CAR	ATL	BRI	DAR	NWS	MAR	TAL	NSV	DOV	CLT	TWS	RSD	MCH	DAY	NSV	POC	TAL	MCH	BRI	DAR	RCH	DOV	NWS	MAR	CLT	CAR	ATL	ONT	NA	-	

===== Daytona 500 =====
Year	Team	Manufacturer	Start	Finish
1962	Holman-Moody	Ford	7	27
1963	Holman-Moody	Ford	11	5
1964	Wood Brothers Racing	Ford	20	14

=== Complete USAC Championship Car results ===
Year	1	2	3	4	5	6	7	8	9	10	11	12	13	14	15	16	17	18	19	20	21	22	23	24	25	26	27	28	Pos	Points
1962	TRE	INDY; 20	MIL	LAN	TRE	SPR	MIL	LAN	SYR	ISF	TRE	SAC	PHX																-	0
1963	TRE	INDY; 7	MIL	LAN	TRE	SPR	MIL; 3	DUQ	ISF	TRE; 16	SAC	PHX																	12th	580
1964	PHX	TRE	INDY; 17	MIL	LAN	TRE	SPR	MIL	DUQ	ISF	TRE	SAC	PHX																-	0
1965	PHX	TRE	INDY; 26	MIL	LAN	PPR	TRE	IRP	ATL	LAN	MIL; 3	ISF	MIL; 12	DSF	INF	TRE	SAC	PHX											26th	230
1966	PHX	TRE	INDY; 27	MIL	LAN	ATL	PIP	IRP	LAN	SPR	MIL	DUQ	ISF	TRE	SAC	PHX													-	0
1967	PHX	TRE	INDY; 21	MIL	LAN	PIP	MOS	MOS	IRP	LAN	MTR	MTR	SPR	MIL	DUQ	ISF	TRE	SAC	HAN	PHX	RIV; 1								-	0
1968	HAN	LVG; 16	PHX	TRE	INDY; 2	MIL	MOS; 1	MOS; 1	LAN	PIP	CDR	NAZ	IRP	IRP	LAN	LAN	MTR	MTR	SPR	MIL	DUQ	ISF	TRE	SAC	MCH	HAN	PHX	RIV; 1	7th	1,800
1969	PHX	HAN	INDY; 2	MIL	LAN	PIP	CDR; 2	NAZ	TRE	IRP; 1	IRP; 21	MIL	SPR	DOV	DUQ	ISF	BRN; 2	BRN; 1	TRE	SAC	KEN; 3	KEN; 4	PHX	RIV; 3					4th	2,280
1970	PHX	SON; 1	TRE	INDY; 3	MIL	LAN	CDR	MCH	IRP	SPR	MIL	ONT; 18	DUQ	ISF	SED	TRE	SAC	PHX											11th	1,000

Winner of the 1958 inaugural USAC Road Racing Championship.

=== Complete Indianapolis 500 results ===
Year	Chassis	Engine	Start	Finish
1962	Thompson	Buick	8th	20th
1963	Lotus	Ford	12th	7th
1964	Lotus	Ford	6th	17th
1965	Lotus	Ford	3rd	26th
1966	Eagle	Ford	19th	27th
1967	Eagle	Ford	2nd	21st
1968	Eagle	Ford	10th	2nd
1969	Eagle	Ford	10th	2nd
1970	Eagle	Offy	11th	3rd

== See also ==
- Formula One drivers from the United States
- Riverside International Automotive Museum

Sporting positions
Preceded by Mike Spence	Brands Hatch Race of Champions; Winner; 1967	Succeeded by Bruce McLaren
Preceded by Bruce McLaren; Chris Amon	Winner of the 24 Hours of Le Mans; 1967; With: A. J. Foyt	Succeeded by Pedro Rodriguez; Lucien Bianchi
