= Astor Cup =

The Astor Cup was awarded by members of the Astor family in the United States in two different sports:

- Astor Cup (auto race), run in New York in 1915 and 1916 with the trophy donated by Vincent Astor. Since 2011, the trophy is presented by Indy Racing League, LLC, for the IndyCar Series Championship.
- Astor Cup (yachting), first held in Newport, Rhode Island in 1882, it is an annual event with the trophy donated by John Jacob Astor III
