= Johnny Aitken =

American racing driver (1885–1918)

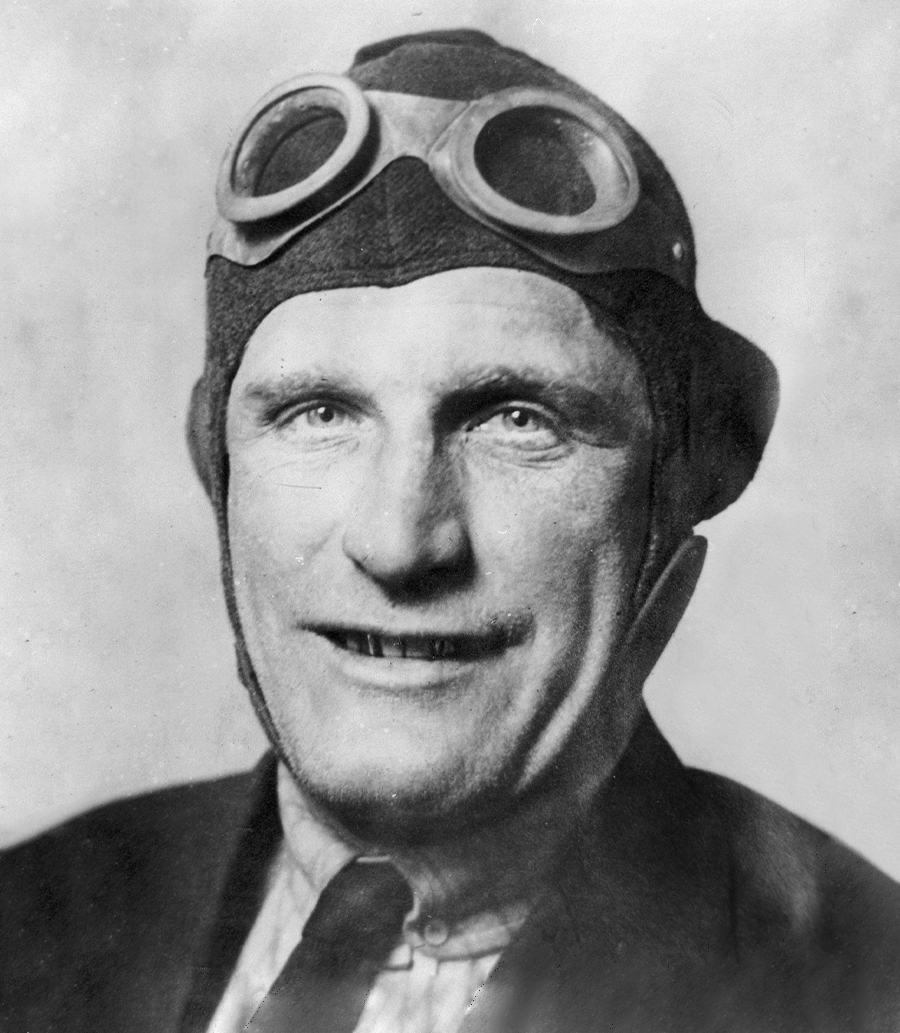
- Aitken, circa 1915
- Born: John Donald Aitken; May 3, 1885 Indianapolis, Indiana, U.S.
- Died: October 15, 1918 (aged 33) Indianapolis, Indiana, U.S.

Champ Car career
- 23 races run over 5 years
- Best finish: 2nd (1916)
- First race: 1909 Wheeler-Schebler; Trophy (Indianapolis)
- Last race: 1916 American Grand Prize (Santa Monica)
- First win: 1910 Atlanta Automobile Association; Trophy (Atlanta)
- Last win: 1916 American Grand Prize (Santa Monica)
Wins	Podiums	Poles
7	11	1

John Donald Aitken (May 3, 1885 – October 15, 1918) was an American racing driver from Indianapolis, who was active in the years prior to World War I. Aitken competed in the Indianapolis 500 three times. He started the race twice, in 1911 and 1916. He led the first lap of the first race (1911). Aitken captured the pole position in 1916, but ended up in 15th place (his best finish) that year. In the 1915 Indianapolis 500, Aitken drove relief for two drivers, Gil Andersen and Earl Cooper (who ultimately finished third and fourth).

== Biography ==
Aitken competed in the Indianapolis 500 three times. He started the race twice, in 1911 and 1916. He led the first lap of the first race (1911). Aitken captured the pole position in 1916, but ended up in 15th place (his best finish) that year. In the 1915 Indianapolis 500, Aitken drove relief for two drivers, Gil Andersen and Earl Cooper (who ultimately finished third and fourth).

While Aitken never won the Indianapolis 500 as a driver, he did serve as team manager for two winning efforts, Joe Dawson’s victory in 1912, and Jules Goux’s win in 1913.

Aitken’s activity at the Indianapolis Motor Speedway was not limited to the Indianapolis 500. He won a total of 15 races at IMS, the most of any driver in the 100-year history of the track. Aitken was the only driver to win races in each of the four automobile race weekends that were held during the track’s “pre-500” years of 1909–1910. He also won all three races which comprised the Harvest Auto Racing Classic, in September 1916. (The driver with the second-greatest number of wins at IMS is Ray Harroun, with 8 wins in 1909–1911.)

Aitken started a total of 41 races at the Indianapolis Motor Speedway, which is, again, the most of any driver in the track's history. (The driver with the second-greatest number of starts at IMS is A. J. Foyt, who started a total of 36 races from 1958 to 1994.)

Outside of his participation at the Indianapolis Motor Speedway, Aitken is known to have started at least 33 AAA-sanctioned races, from 1907 to 1916, and to have driven relief in at least three others. He won seven of these races, including the 1916 1st International Sweepstakes race (300 miles, Sept 14, at the Cincinnati Motor Speedway), the 1916 Astor Cup Race (250 miles, Sept 30, at the Sheepshead Bay Speedway), and the 1916 Harkness Trophy Race (100 miles, Oct 28, also at Sheepshead Bay).

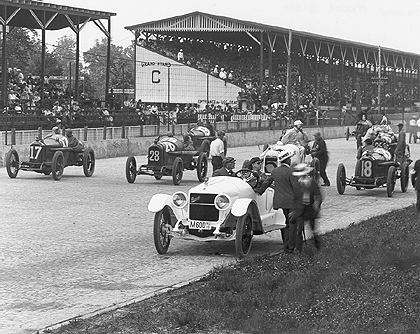
Aitken's car #18 (right) on the pole preparing for the 1916 Indianapolis 500

Aitken is credited as co-winner of the American Grand Prize, which was held at the Santa Monica Road Race Course on Nov 18, 1916. He started the race, but was the first driver to drop out, when his car suffered a broken piston after one lap. On Lap 21, he took over the car which had started the race being driven by Howdy Wilcox. Aitken drove that car for the remainder of the race, completing 28 of the total 48 laps, finishing first. Aitken, therefore, was credited with both first and last place. (Such scoring would not take place under the current rules of most racing series.) Despite this, the AAA Contest Board ruled him ineligible for points, and he finished second overall in the 1916 season.

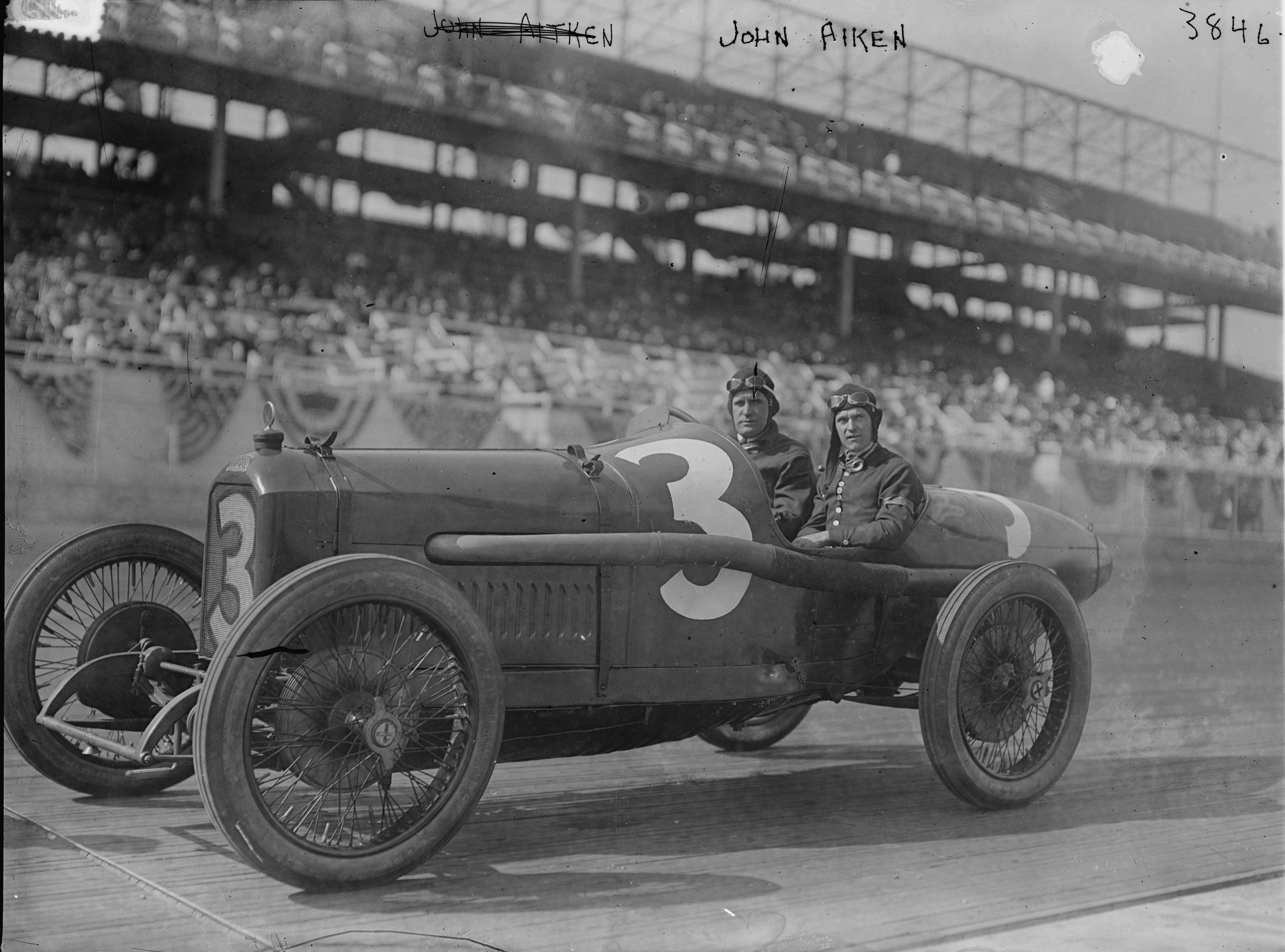
Johnny Aitken on May 13, 1916, at the Sheepshead Bay Speedway

Aitken died on October 15, 1918, of bronchopneumonia from the Influenza pandemic of 1918.

== Motorsports career results ==
=== Indianapolis 500 results ===
Year	Car	Start	Qual	Rank	Finish	Laps	Led	Retired
1911	4	4	—	—	27	125	8	Rod
1916	18	1	96.690	1	15	69	8	Valve
Totals						194	16	

Starts	2
Poles	1
Front Row	1
Wins	0
Top 5	0
Top 10	0
Retired	2
