= 1914 Grand Prix season =

Grand Prix season

Seasons
- ← 1913 1915 →

The 1914 Grand Prix season consisted of Grand Prix races across Europe and the United States until abbreviated by the outbreak of World War I.

The Vanderbilt Cup and the American Grand Prize were held again after a year’s abeyance, this time raced at Santa Monica, California. European cars arrived in force to contest the Indianapolis 500. French cars dominated the race taking the top four places with victory going to René Thomas in a Delage. The unofficial AAA national championship would be awarded to Ralph DePalma.

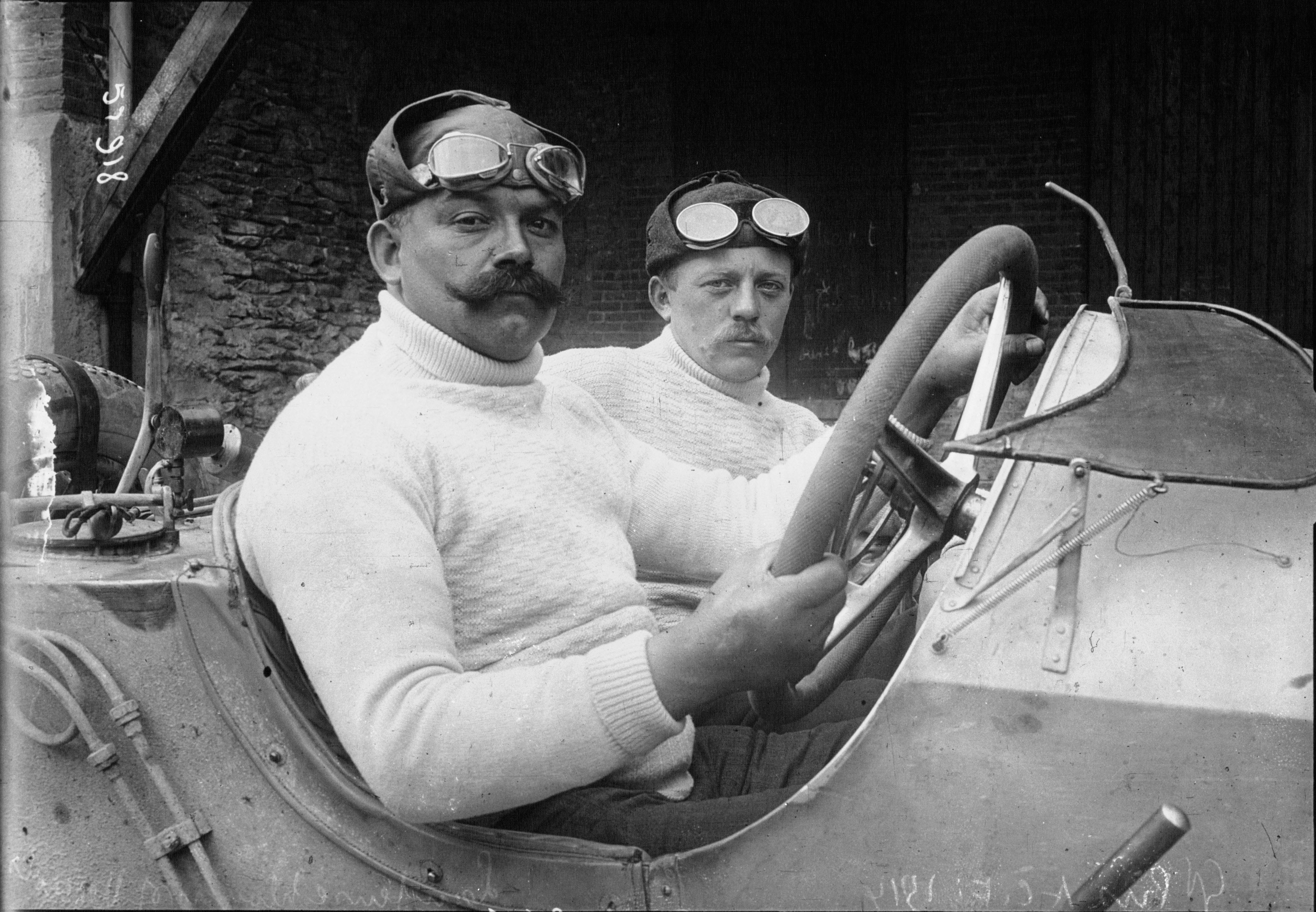
Christian Lautenschlager, winner of the French Grand Prix

The French Grand Prix was in Lyon, this time with a maximum engine size of 4.5-litres. Held in the shadow of political crisis in Europe, it was hailed as the greatest race to date, after an epic battle between the Peugeot and Mercedes. After Georges Boillot had engine problems on the last lap, it left the German team with a dominating 1-2-3 finish, led by Christian Lautenschlager who had won the race before, in 1908.

It proved to be the last major race before war overtook Europe in August 1914.

== Major races ==
Date	Name	Circuit	Race Regulations	Race Distance	Winner’s Time	Winning driver	Winning constructor	Report
26 Feb	(United States) IX Vanderbilt Cup	Santa Monica	Vanderbilt	300 miles	3h 54m	(United States) Ralph DePalma	Mercedes GP	Report
28 Feb	(United States) V American Grand Prize	Santa Monica	Formula Libre	400 miles	5h 14m	(United States) Eddie Pullen	Mercer 35-R	Report
14 Apr	(Italy) Coppa Florio	Madonie	Targa Florio	445 km	~8h	(Italy) Felice Nazzaro	Nazzaro	Report
24/25 May	(Italy) IX Targa Florio (Giro di Sicilia)	Madonie	Targa Florio	980 km	16h 52m	(Italy) Ernesto Ceirano	SCAT 22/32	Report
30 May	(United States) IV Indianapolis 500	Indianapolis	AAA	500 miles	6h 04m	(France) René Thomas	Delage Type Y	Report
31 May	(Russia) II Russian Grand Prix	St Petersburg				(Germany) Willy Scholl	Benz 55/150hp	Report
10/11 Jun	(United Kingdom) Tourist Trophy	Isle of Man		600 miles	10h 38m	(United Kingdom) Kenelm Lee Guinness	Sunbeam 3.3L	Report
4 July	(France) XIV French Grand Prix	Lyon	ACF	750 km	7h 08m	(Germany) Christian Lautenschlager	Mercedes GP 18/100	Report

== Regulations and technical ==
The three main American races all ran to different regulations: the Vanderbilt Cup’s engine limits were 301 – 600 cu in, Indianapolis had a maximum engine size of 450 cu in, while the Grand Prize had an open formula.

Hoping to minimise the impact of the big-engined cars of foreign manufacturers, the ACF changed its regulations again for the first time to impose a maximum engine size – of 4.5-litres, along with an allowable weight range of 800-1100kg (excluding fluids and tools). This tended to favour those companies that had invested in voiturette racing, Peugeot, Delage and Sunbeam. There was also an entry limit of five cars per manufacturer.

For this, Peugeot unveiled its new EX-5 from Ernest Henry, with a twin-overhead cam 4.5-litre four-cylinder engine. Both the Delages and Peugeots had four-wheel brakes for the first time, along with FIAT. In response, the Mercedes 18/100 GP, designed by Paul Daimler, developed 115 bhp. The 4.5-litre engine had four valves per cylinder and a single overhead camshaft. Gone was the chain-drive, instead a lighter live rear-axle was used. However, they did persist with rear brakes only. Despite a better top-end speed from the Peugeot’s streamlined rear-end, the Mercedes’ lower centre-of-gravity and better road-holding gave it an edge over the French cars.

Manufacturer	Model	Engine	Power Output	Max. Speed (km/h)	Dry Weight (kg)
(France) Peugeot	EX-5	Peugeot 4.5L S4	112 bhp	185	1060
(France) Delage	Type S	Delage 4.4L S4	113 bhp	160	1098
(Germany) Mercedes	GP 18/100	Mercedes 4.5L S4	115 bhp	180	1092
(United Kingdom) Sunbeam		Sunbeam 4.4L S4	115 bhp	165	1095
(Italy) FIAT	S57/14B	FIAT 4.5L S4	135 bhp	145	1025
(France) Th. Schneider		Th. Schneider 4.4L S4	110 bhp	150	1085
(France) Alda		Alda 4.4L S4	100 bhp	155	1010
(Germany) Opel		Opel 4.4L S4	105 bhp	160	935
(United Kingdom) Vauxhall		Vauxhall 4.5L S4	130 bhp	160	1070
(Italy) Aquila Italiana		Aquila Italiana 4.5L S6	118 bhp	150	1095
(Italy) ALFA		ALFA 4.5L S6	88 bhp	150	1050
(Italy) Nazzaro		Nazzaro 4.4L S4	100 bhp	155	1095
(United States) Duesenberg		Duesenberg 5.9L S4	95 bhp	165	1020
(United States) Maxwell		Maxwell 4.9L S4	130 bhp	175	1010

== Season review ==
The Vanderbilt Cup and American Grand Prize were revived this year and once again held as a combined meeting, this time on an 8-mile road circuit at Santa Monica, California. The press touted the Cup as a grudge match between rivals Ralph DePalma and Barney Oldfield. DePalma had walked out from his role as team leader at Mercer when they hired Oldfield without asking him first. DePalma retrieved the Mercedes with which he had won the 1912 race. From the start Oldfield’s teammate Eddie Pullen took the lead until he lost a wheel. Then Oldfield and DePalma ran wheel to wheel until DePalma sold a dummy on stopping for a tyre change. Oldfield took the bait and pitted, allowing the older Mercedes to race onto victory.

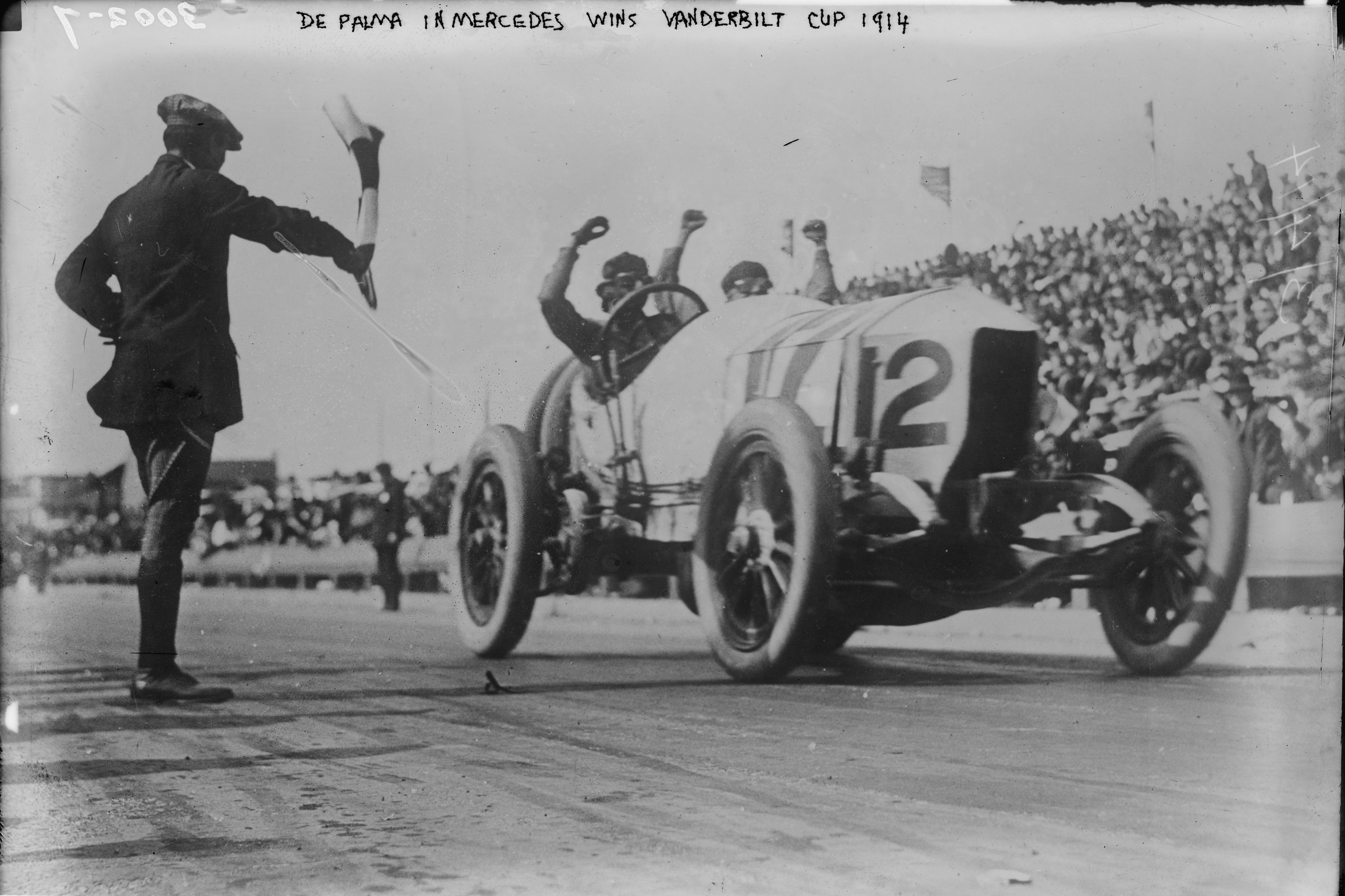
DePalma taking the flag at the Vanderbilt Cup

Two days later, 250000 spectators and most of the same cars returned for the Grand Prize. Spencer Wishart led in his Mercer for most of the first half of the race until stopped by engine problems. DePalma took over but this time his engine gave out as well. Pullen got to the front and carried on to win – his Mercer being the first American car to win the Grand Prize delighting the crowd.

After Peugeot’s success at Indianapolis in 1913, more European teams returned for the 1914 race and the race promised to be a great showdown between the best drivers from both sides of the Atlantic with most of the best teams present. Peugeot sent its new EX-5 with regular team drivers Georges Boillot and Jules Goux (returning 1913 winner) along with a 3-litre EX-3 for Belgian Arthur Duray. Delage sent its 7.0-litre Type Y for René Thomas and Albert Guyot. Peugeot engineer Ettore Bugatti had Ernest Friderich in one of his own cars. As well as an Italian Isotta Fraschini and a Belgian Excelsior, Ralph Mulford returned with his Mercedes. Sunbeam came from England with Jean Chassagne and another car for Harry Grant. The American teams from Mercer, Stutz and Mason entered, with much the same driver line-ups from Santa Monica. Barney Oldfield however had switched to Stutz. Inaugural winner Ray Harroun designed the Maxwell car for Teddy Tetzlaff and Billy Carlson.

Boillot was the fastest in the elimination trials, setting a lap record of 99.9 mph. Second was team-mate Goux with Tetzlaff third. In a big surprise, Ralph DePalma failed to qualify in his privateer Mercedes. In the random draw it was Chassagne’s Sunbeam that got the pole position, while Boillot got the second-to-last position of the 30 qualifiers.

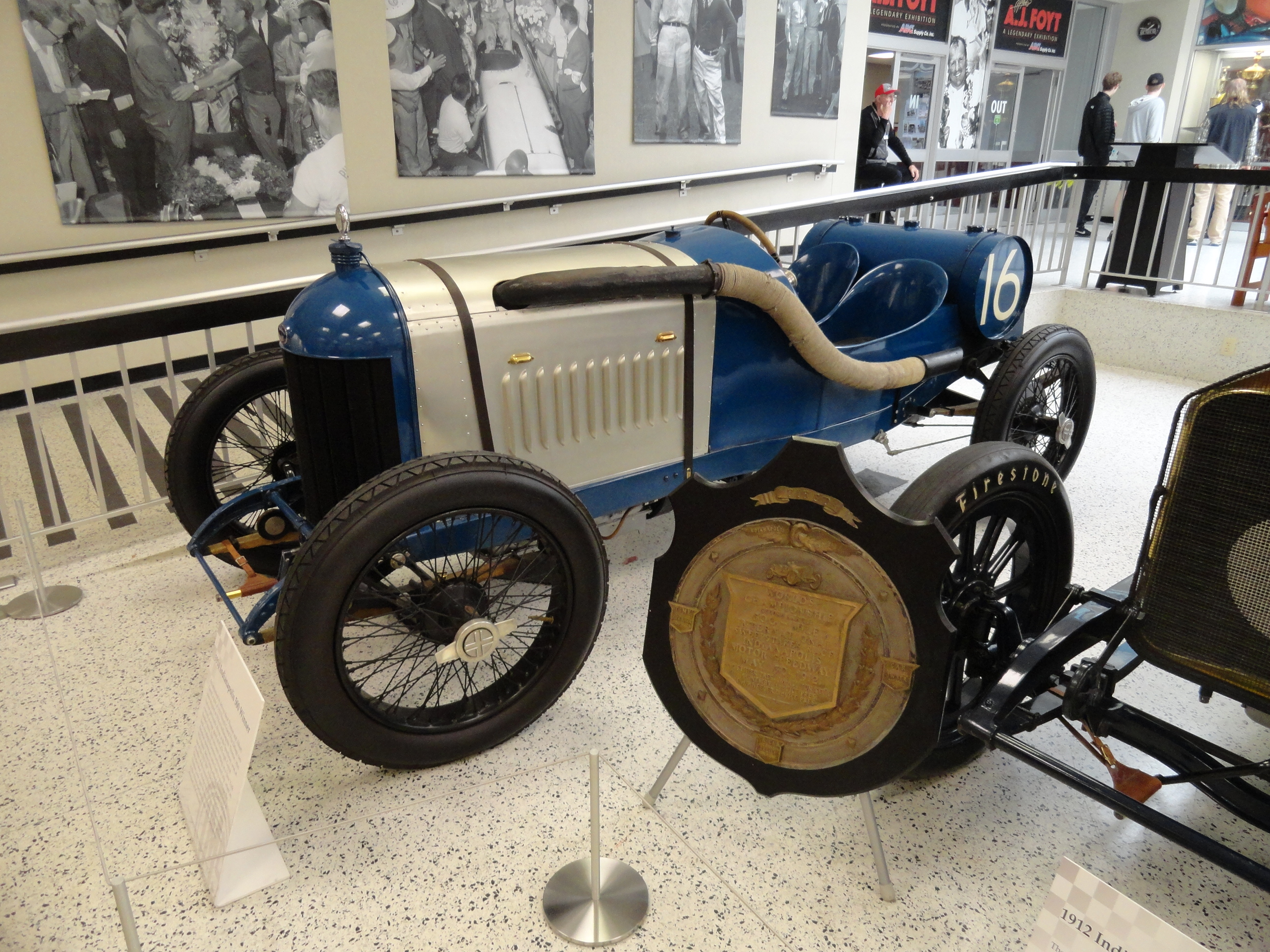
Thomas’s Delage, winning car of the Indianapolis 500

The three Peugeots soon got to the front and were setting the pace until thwarted by tyre problems. One delaminated on Boillot’s car spinning him off the track and Goux lost time with a number of stops. On lap 42 Ray Gilhooley crashed his Isotta on the back straight. As his mechanic was escaping the wreck Joe Dawson had to take drastic avoiding action and rolled his Marmon in an accident that ended his career. In the end it was dominant victory for René Thomas and Delage, who led for over half the race winning with over a 6-minute, four-lap margin from Arthur Duray in the 3-litre Peugeot. Thomas’ teammate Guyot was third with Goux coming in fourth. First American home was Barney Oldfield, fifth in the Stutz.

After another dozen rounds at eight other circuits, the AAA national championship would be unofficially awarded to Ralph DePalma. On 4 July at the Sioux City race, Eddie Rickenbacker had scored the first victory for Fred Duesenberg’s new team (formerly Mason). Sadly, top driver Spencer Wishart, second at the previous year’s Indianapolis race, was killed when his Mercer crashed during the Elgin Trophy races.

Two other racing events returned, both last held in 1908. The Coppa Florio was won that year by Felice Nazzaro in a FIAT. This time it ran over three laps on the Madonie course in Sicily. It was won again by Nazzaro, this time in his own car repeating his triumph from the 1913 Targa Florio. Second was Ernesto Ceirano in his company’s SCAT. Six weeks later the Targa Florio again ran as the Giro di Sicilia around the coastal roads of Sicily. A two-day event, this time it stopped overnight in Syracuse. Ceirano won in 17 hours, at a record speed of 62 km/h and a comfortable 2-hour margin.

Similarly, the RAC Tourist Trophy was held after a hiatus of six years. Raced on the Isle of Man, it was staged over two days with eight laps on each day, and for the first time offered a cash prize – the considerable sum of £1000. Kenelm Lee Guinness, of the famous brewing family, won in a 3.4-litre Sunbeam from a pair of Belgian Minervas.

On 28 June, the heir to the Austro-Hungarian empire was assassinated in Sarajevo. By co-incidence, one of the royal chauffeurs was former Mercedes works-driver Otto Merz. A week later, the French Grand Prix was held under an increasingly tense political situation across Europe. The city of Lyon promised large subsidies and the race was held on a 38 km road circuit to the south of the city. It ran from Les Ronzières to Givors, then along the bank of the Gier (a tributary of the Rhône) to Châteauneuf before taking an undulating 15km straight back to a steep downhill right-left and a hairpin to complete the lap.

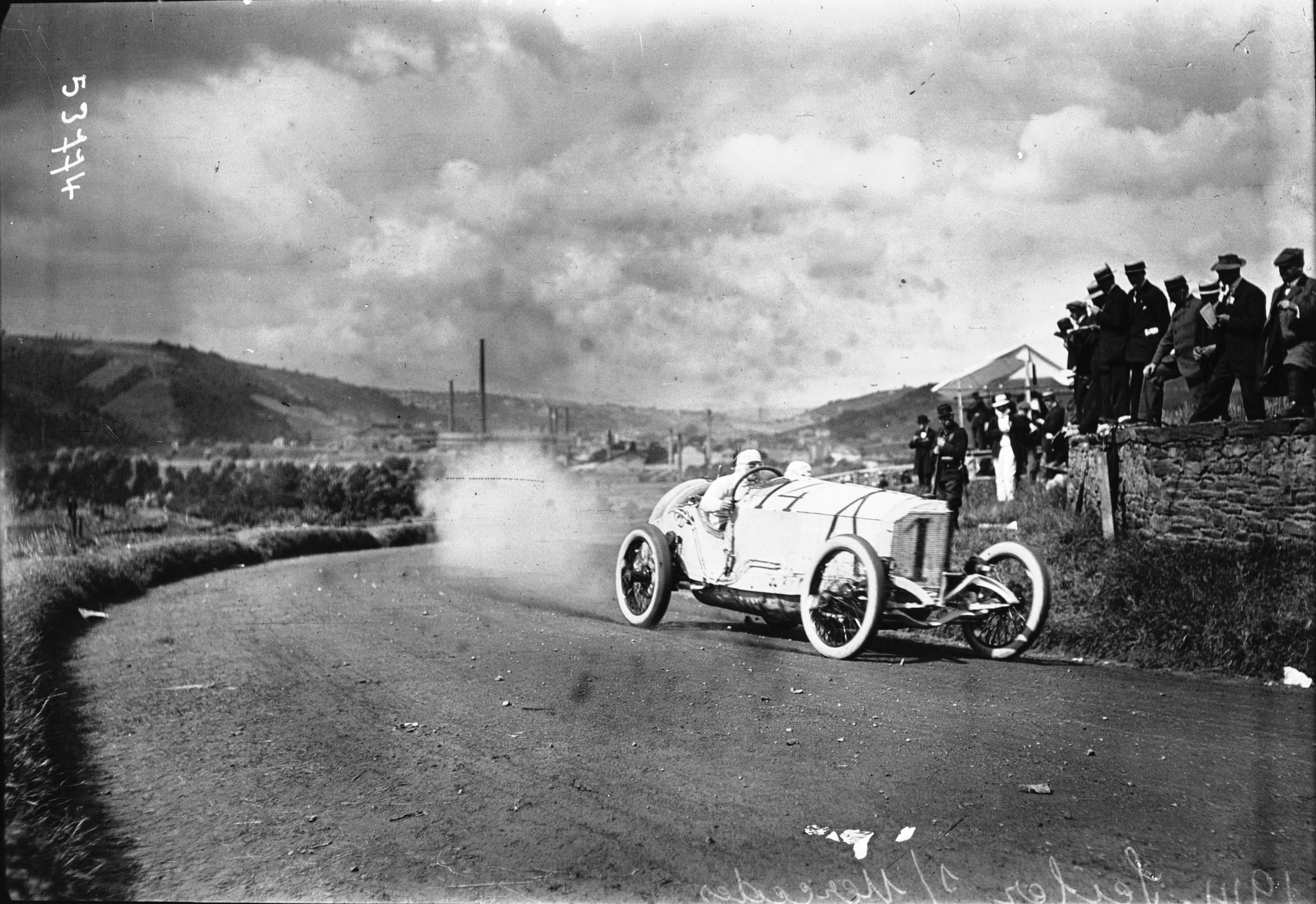
Sailer setting the pace in his Mercedes at the Grand Prix

The race attracted a high-quality field of 37 starters from 13 manufacturers. Peugeot were the favourites to repeat their victories in 1912 and 1913. They arrived with three of their new L-45 cars for Boillot, Goux and Victor Rigal. Louis Delâge bought the new 5-speed Type S for Guyot, Duray and Paul Bablot. New French company Alva convinced Ferenc Szisz, winner of the inaugural Grand Prix in 1906, out of retirement to lead their team. Their most serious opposition to the French teams would come from Mercedes, returning to the Grand Prix for the first time since winning in 1908. Five of the six 18/100 cars built were entered with a strong team of drivers led by Christian Lautenschlager, victor in 1908, along with Otto Salzer, Mercedes director Max Sailer, French veteran Louis Wagner and Belgian agent Théodore Pilette. In January, as part of its meticulous preparation, Mercedes had sent its team to France to go over the track. Opel arrived with the lightest cars in the field, well over 100kg lighter than most others. Carl Jörns led a team of three cars. From Italy came FIAT (including veteran Alessandro Cagno), Felice Nazzaro’s own team and a single entry from Aquila Italiana. Great Britain was represented by Sunbeam (Resta, Lee Guinness and Chassagne) and Vauxhall who included American Ralph DePalma in their squad.

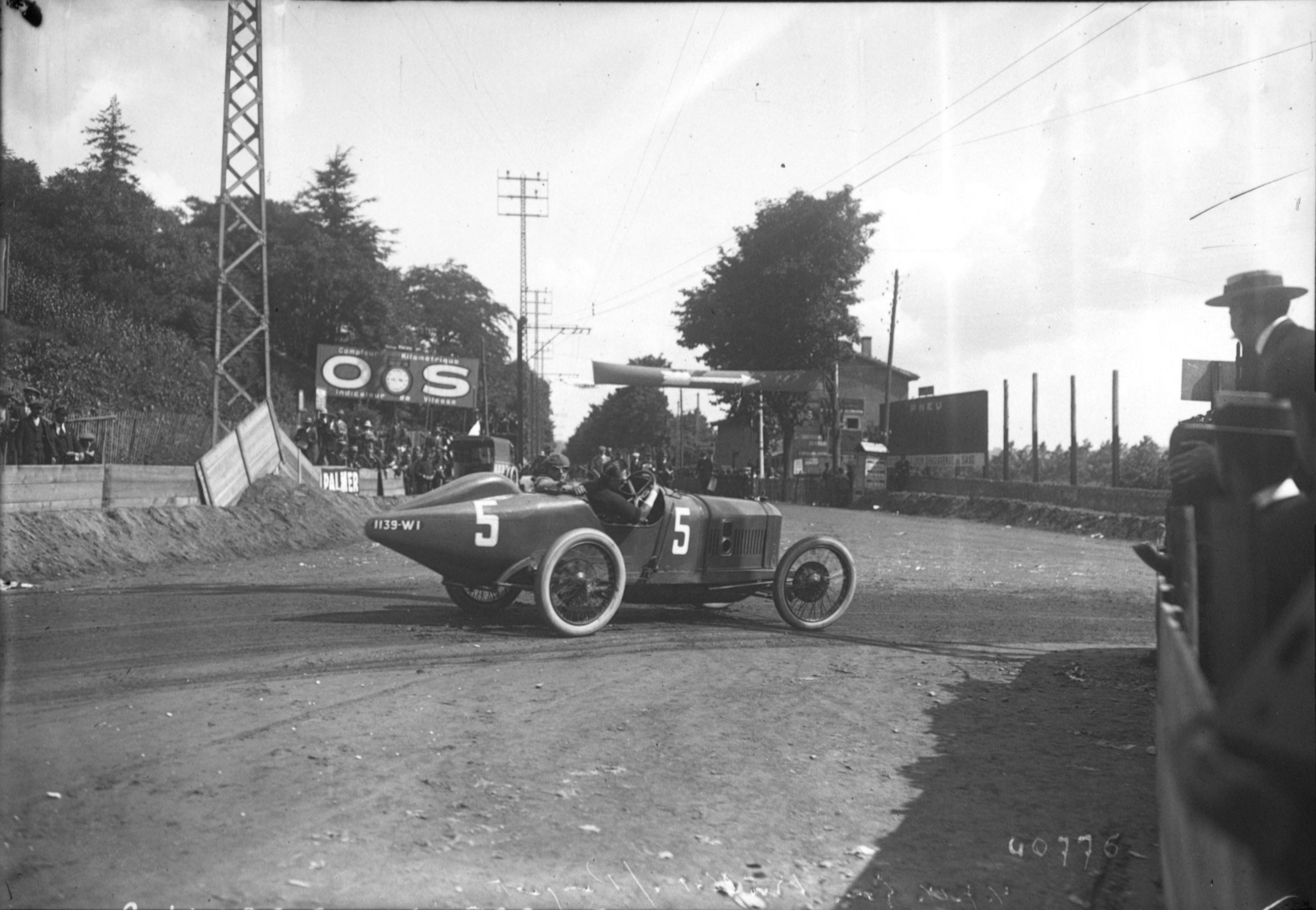
Boillot’s Peugeot at the French Grand Prix

Race-day was hot and fine, and about 300,000 spectators lined the roads. The cars started the 20-lap race in pairs in numerical order, at 30-second intervals. First away were Szisz and Jörns, but Boillot was the first to arrive back at the finish-line. However, Sailer was ahead on elapsed-time and from the beginning he forced the pace, drawing Boillot into a speed-contest to try and break the Peugeot. On the sixth lap though his Mercedes stopped with engine problems letting Boillot take over the lead. By the 11th lap, just after the halfway mark, Wagner had passed Goux then Lautenschlager to move into second. Szisz had pulled over to replace a wheel, when he was struck by an Opel, that broke his arm.

At the three-quarter mark, Lautenschlager retook second place and started closing on the Peugeot only two and a half minutes ahead. In an epic drive under relentless pressure, Boillot pushed his car to its limit but to no avail. On the eighteenth lap the German took the lead and set about building the gap. Now down to three cylinders, Boillot kept pushing regardless but on the last lap his engine expired leaving Mercedes, after seven hours, to take a crushing 1-2-3 victory with Lautenschlager repeating his 1908 win ahead of Wagner and Salzer. The French crowd was silent, with Goux’s fourth place nearly ten minutes back ahead of Resta’s Sunbeam being scant consolation. With his 25000 franc prizemoney, Lautenschlager was able to build himself a house.

And so it was that perhaps the greatest race of the early period of motor-racing was also the last. Within a month, Europe had descended into total war and racing ceased there for four years. A number of racers served in the war. Georges Boillot was initially the personal driver for Marshal Joffre, but then transferred to the French Air Force (Armée de l'Air) as a fighter pilot. He was killed in a dogfight over Verdun in 1916. Eddie Rickenbacker became the highest scoring ace in the American Air Service. Awarded the Distinguished Service Cross eight times and Medal of Honor (in 1930), he survived the war to take up racing again.

Citations
