= 1914 American Grand Prize =

Race details
- Date: February 28, 1914
- Official name: V American Grand Prize
- Location: Santa Monica, United States
- Course: Public roads (Santa Monica Road Race Course)
- Course length: 13.546 km (8.417 miles)
- Distance: 48 laps, 650.201 km (404.016 miles)

Podium
First	(United States) Eddie Pullen	Mercer
Second	(United States) Guy Ball	Marmon
Third	(United States) William Taylor	Alco

The 1914 American Grand Prize, held on February 28, 1914, was the third race of the 1914 Grand Prix season. It was held at the Santa Monica Road Course in Santa Monica, California. The Vanderbilt Cup, another Grand Prix race, was held on the same track two days earlier. The Mercer of Eddie Pullen won by almost 40 minutes over the Marmon of Guy Ball.

== Classification ==
Pos	No	Driver	Car	Laps	Time/Retired
1	4	(United States) Eddie Pullen	Mercer	48	5:13:30
2	17	(United States) Guy Ball	Marmon	48	5:53:23
3	6	(United States) William Taylor	Alco	48	6:08:29
4	12	(United States) Ralph DePalma	Mercedes	48	6:09:08
5	3	(United States) Gil Andersen	Stutz-Wisconsin	44	Engine
6	9	(United States) Huntley Gordon	Mercer	39	+9 Laps
7	7	(United States) Barney Oldfield	Mercer	36	Fuel Pump
8	20	(United States) Eddie Rickenbacker	Mason-Duesenberg	33	Crankshaft
9	14	(United States) John Marquis	Sunbeam	32	Crash
10	15	(United States) Charles Muth	Marmon	23	Out of fuel
11	19	(United States) Tony Janette	Alco	23	Broken cylinder
12	2	(United States) Spencer Wishart	Mercer	22	Bearing
13	16	(United States) Dave Lewis	Fiat	22	Bearing
14	1	(United States) Teddy Tetzlaff	Fiat	17	Connecting rod guide
15	11	(United States) Frank Goode	Apperson	17	Push rod
16	8	(United States) Earl Cooper	Stutz-Wisconsin	5	Valve
17	18	(United States) Frank Verbeck	Fiat	1	Valve
DNS	6	(United States) William Carlson	Mason-Duesenberg	0	Connecting Rod
DNS		(United States) Harry Grant	Isotta Fraschini	0	did not start
DNP		(United States) Omar Toft	Delage	0	did not appear

Grand Prix Race
1914 Grand Prix season
Previous race: 1912 American Grand Prize	United States Grand Prix	Next race: 1915 American Grand Prize
