= United States Grand Prix =

Formula One Grand Prix

- Circuit of the Americas

Race information
- Number of times held: 55
- First held: 1908
- Most wins (drivers): (United Kingdom) Lewis Hamilton (6)
- Most wins (constructors): (Italy) Ferrari (11)
- Circuit length: 5.513 km (3.426 miles)
- Race length: 308.432 km (191.650 miles)
- Laps: 56

Last race (2026)

Pole position
- (Italy) Kimi Antonelli; Mercedes; 1:34.035

Podium
- 1. (Italy) K. Antonelli; Mercedes; 1:35:16.650; 2. (Monaco) C. Leclerc; Ferrari; +13.078; 3. (Netherlands) M. Verstappen; Red Bull Racing-Red Bull Ford; +17.485

Fastest lap
- (Monaco) Charles Leclerc; Ferrari; 1:37.976

The United States Grand Prix is a motor racing event that has been held on and off since 1908, when it was known as the American Grand Prize. The Grand Prix later became part of the Formula One World Championship. As of 2026, the Grand Prix has been held 55 times at ten locations. Since 2012, it has been held every year at the Circuit of the Americas in Austin, Texas, except in 2020 when it was cancelled due to the COVID-19 pandemic.

== History ==
=== Beginnings and the Vanderbilt Cup ===
Inspired by the Gordon Bennett Cup and Circuit des Ardennes races he had competed in, William Kissam Vanderbilt II founded a series of road races in the United States to showcase American road racing to the world. First established in 1904, the Vanderbilt Cup became an institution on New York's Long Island, attracting American and European competitors alike. However, the race was plagued by crowd control problems, which led to spectator deaths and injuries, and the cancellation of the 1907 event. Upon its return for 1908, the American Automobile Association did not adopt the new Grand Prix regulations agreed upon by the Association Internationale des Automobiles Clubs Reconnus (AIACR). This led the rival Automobile Club of America, an enthusiasts group with strong ties to Europe, to sponsor the American Grand Prize, using the Grand Prix rules. The Savannah Automobile Club of Savannah, Georgia, which had staged two days of successful stock car races on March 18 and 19, 1908, won the rights to stage the event.

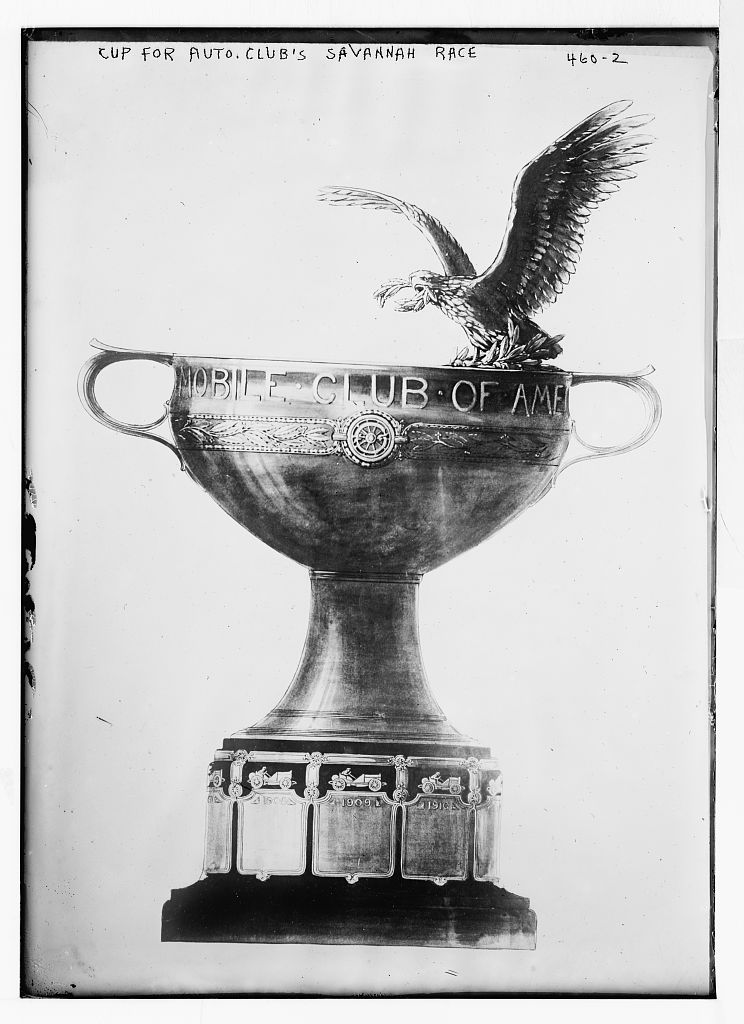
American Grand Prize trophy

=== The Grand Prize era ===
The Savannah Automobile Club laid out a lengthened version of their stock car course, totaling 25.130 mi (40.443 km). Georgia Governor M. Hoke Smith authorized the use of convict labor to construct the circuit of oiled gravel. The Governor also sent state militia troops to augment local police patrols in keeping the crowd in check, hoping to avoid the pitfalls of the Vanderbilt Cup races. The entry for the inaugural race featured 14 European and six American entries, including factory teams from Benz, Fiat, and Renault. In the race, held on Thanksgiving Day, Ralph DePalma led early in his Fiat, before falling back with lubrication and tire problems. The race came down to a three-way battle among the Benz of Victor Hémery and the Fiats of Louis Wagner and Felice Nazzaro. Wagner won the race by the close margin of 56 seconds.

Despite the success of the Savannah event, it was decided that the 1909 race would be held on Long Island, in conjunction with the Vanderbilt Cup. However, only the Vanderbilt race was held and the Grand Prize pushed back to the next year. After the 1910 Vanderbilt Cup saw more issues, including the deaths of two riding mechanics and several serious spectator injuries, the Grand Prize was cancelled once again. A last-minute request by the Savannah club saved the race for the year, but only gave one month to prepare the course. A shorter 17.300 mi (27.842 km) course was laid out, but due to the short notice, most European teams were not able to make the trip. The leading trio from 1908 did make it and American David Bruce-Brown joined the Benz squad. Bruce-Brown won another incredibly tight race over teammate Hémery, this time by only 1.42 seconds. The 1911 event returned to Savannah, and this time the Vanderbilt Cup came with it; the Cup and Grand Prize were to be held together until 1916. Despite the success of the events, public pressure started to mount on the organizers. The use of convict labor and the militia drew criticism, as did the nuisance of closing roads for the event. Two accidents on the open roads in practice, one resulting in the death of Jay McNay, cast a shadow over the event. The American entries dominated the support events and ran well throughout the Grand Prize, after poor showings in past years and once again Bruce-Brown triumphed, this time driving a Fiat.

For 1912, Savannah succumbed to public pressure, and Milwaukee, Wisconsin, won the bid for the race. A narrow, 7.880 mi (12.682 km) trapezoidal course was set up on the outskirts of the city, in Wauwatosa. As in 1911, tragedy struck in practice when David Bruce-Brown was killed after a puncture sent him off the road. On the final lap of the race, Ralph DePalma collided with eventual winner Caleb Bragg, seriously injuring DePalma and his mechanic and ending any chance of a second race at Milwaukee.

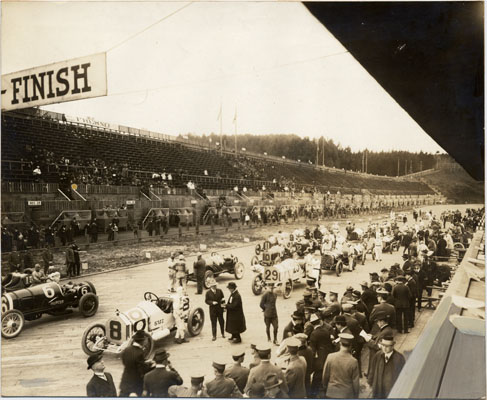
The grid for the 1915 Grand Prize in San Francisco

The Grand Prize was not held in 1913, after Long Island's bid was rejected and Savannah refused to provide sufficient prize money. Oval racing on board tracks had taken off in the United States, to the detriment of road racing. For 1914, the Grand Prize and Vanderbilt Cup were staged at Santa Monica Road Race Course, near Los Angeles, on an 8.417 mi (13.546 km) course, with the start/finish straight along the Pacific Ocean. The field was primarily American entries (twelve, against five European entries), and the Americans dominated, with Eddie Pullen's Mercer winning by over 40 seconds. In 1915, the race shifted to San Francisco, in conjunction with the Panama–Pacific International Exposition. With the outbreak of World War I in Europe, almost all of the drivers and cars were American, except for a few cars imported earlier. The 3.840 mi (6.180 km) course was set up around the Exposition grounds and nearby oval track with a boarded main straightaway. Heavy rain began two hours into the race, covering the circuit in mud from the extensive flower arrangements, and warping the main straight's boards. Dario Resta in a Peugeot cruised to a seven-minute victory, and followed up a week later by winning the Vanderbilt Cup. For 1916, the Grand Prize returned to Santa Monica. The race would be a part of the AAA National Championship, which carried a 4.91-liter displacement limit. Although the limit for the Grand Prize was 7.37 liters, no large-displacement cars would enter. The race was the penultimate round of the championship, with Dario Resta leading Johnny Aitken after his Vanderbilt Cup win. However, both cars would be out before halfway. Although Aitken took over teammate Howdy Wilcox's car for the win, the AAA awarded points only to Wilcox, and Resta took the championship.

=== Post-WWI decline and the Indianapolis 500 ===
The Grand Prize was discontinued after the 1916 event. Between a lack of European participation due to World War I and the growing American interest in oval racing, road racing fell by the wayside. The two Santa Monica events were the only road races on the 1916 championship, and the aborted 1917 National Championship was slated to feature eight events, all ovals and six of them board tracks. The Vanderbilt Cup was revived in 1936 and 1937 and run to Grand Prix regulations; these races were run at the Roosevelt Park Autodrome near New York City but a lack of competition and domination by German Bernd Rosemeyer and Italian Tazio Nuvolari led to the races being a commercial failure.

The Indianapolis 500 kept a connection to European racing, running to Grand Prix regulations between 1923 and 1930, and from 1938 until 1953. In the late 1920s, efforts were made to refer to the 500 as the American Grand Prize. The Grand Prize trophy was awarded to the winner of the Indianapolis 500 between 1930 and 1936, when it was replaced by the Borg-Warner Trophy. The race was included in the World Championship from 1950 through 1960.

=== Sebring (1959) and Riverside (1958, 1960) ===
In 1957, Riverside International Raceway opened in Riverside, California, about 50 miles (80 km) east of Los Angeles. One of its first events was an SCCA National sports car race. For 1958, the race moved to the new, professional USAC Road Racing Championship, and was billed as the "United States Grand Prix". The race attracted over 50 cars and drivers from sports car series in the US and Europe, as well as USAC and NASCAR. Chuck Daigh won in a Scarab, beating Dan Gurney's Ferrari in second place.

Russian-born Alec Ulmann staged the first 12 Hours of Sebring endurance race in 1952 at the airport (converted from World War II use) of the rather isolated central Florida town of Sebring, located 80 miles (128 km) south of Orlando and Tampa, and 160 miles (256 km) north of Miami. The track was formed using service roads and runways of Sebring's airport, and it became a round of the World Sportscar Championship in 1953. Buoyed by the success of the 12 Hours, the Riverside sports car race and Formula Libre events at Watkins Glen and Lime Rock Park, Ulmann decided to stage a Formula One race at Sebring International Raceway in 1959. The race was billed as the "II United States Grand Prix", cementing the Riverside race as a part of the Grand Prix's heritage. The race was originally scheduled for March 22, the day after the 12 Hour-race, but rescheduled for December 12, the final round of the season. The race took place 3 months after the previous round at Monza. The starting grid included seven American drivers, but New Zealand's Bruce McLaren, in a Cooper, took his first win in F1 and was, at the time, the youngest driver ever to win a Grand Prix. McLaren took the lead on the last lap of the race when his team-mate, Jack Brabham, ran out of fuel. Brabham had to push his car over the line to finish fourth. By virtue of Ferrari's Tony Brooks finishing third, Brabham and Cooper took the Drivers' and Constructors' championships, respectively. Despite providing an exciting climax to the season, the race was not successful from the hosts' standpoint, the race's isolated location did not help the event's success as the promoters barely broke even. When prize money checks bounced, Charles Moran and Briggs Cunningham paid the money to save face for their country.

Ulmann moved the race across the country to Riverside for 1960. Stirling Moss put on quite a show in his privately entered Lotus by winning from pole position. However, while the driver's purse was enormous (as at Sebring), the event was no better received than the previous year's due to a lack of promotion, and proximity to the successful Times Grand Prix. Again Moran and Cunningham would pay the prize money.

=== Watkins Glen (1961–1980) ===
==== 1960s ====
Through most of 1961, Ulmann was listed as the promoter of the USGP; he contacted organizers in Miami and Bill France Sr. of the Daytona International Speedway but was unable to reach agreements. In August, racing promoter Cameron Argetsinger, executive director of the 2.350 mi (3.782 km) Watkins Glen Grand Prix Race Course in upstate New York, offered his circuit to the Automobile Competition Committee for the United States (ACCUS) to host the Grand Prix. The Watkins Glen circuit, which had hosted Formula Libre events, had similarities to the British Brands Hatch circuit: both had several banked corners and were sited in very green parts of the world. ACCUS accepted on August 28. Watkins Glen would host the United States Grand Prix for the next twenty years. The track became known as the Mecca of American road racing and weaved itself into European Grand Prix racing culture.

With six weeks to organize the event, Argetsinger assembled the field, but was unable to convince Scuderia Ferrari to make the trip, leaving Richie Ginther and recently crowned World Champion Phil Hill out of their home Grand Prix. Innes Ireland took a surprise win, his first and the first for Team Lotus. Dan Gurney's Porsche was second, and Tony Brooks, racing in his last Grand Prix, took third. Stirling Moss, in his final Grand Prix, retired with engine problems. Unlike the previous two races, the race was well attended (over 60,000) and turned a profit. The race purse was paid in cash, a popular move with the teams after the previous two years' payment issues.

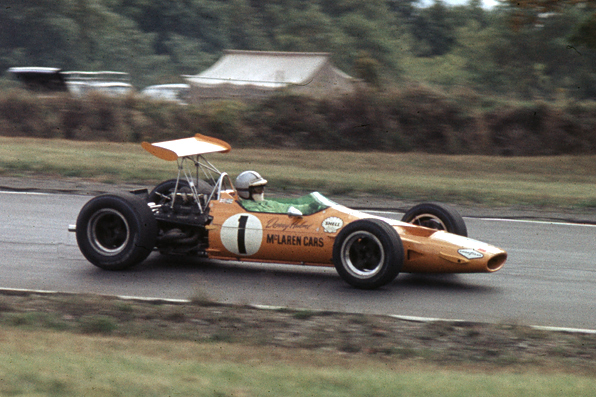
Denny Hulme finished 5th in a McLaren M7A in the 1968 event

In 1962, Jim Clark won for Lotus; the next three races were won by fellow-Briton Graham Hill, whose 1964 win enabled him to carry a points advantage into the final race in Mexico. Clark won again in 1966 and 1967; the 1966 Drivers' and Constructors' championships were clinched at the event by Jack Brabham and his eponymous team. Jackie Stewart won in 1968, followed by Jochen Rindt in 1969. Graham Hill crashed out of the race, and was thrown from the car, breaking both legs.

Due to the USGP's position on the calendar, often either the final or penultimate round, championships were often decided before the event. In part to offset this, race organizers offered large sums of prize money; in 1969 the purse totaled $200,000 (with $50,000 for the winner), and when in 1972 it was raised to $275,000, Tyrrell earned a record $100,000.

==== 1970s ====
In 1970, Emerson Fittipaldi won the race in just his fourth Formula One start. Stewart retired his new Tyrrell and Fittipaldi, driving a Lotus, held off a charge from Pedro Rodriguez in a BRM. It was an emotional win for Colin Chapman's Lotus team, as team leader Rindt was killed practicing at Monza. Lotus had not run the Canadian Grand Prix, but as the next closest championship contender Jacky Ickx did not score enough points to stay in contention, the Drivers' Championship was won posthumously by Rindt, and Team Lotus won the Constructors' Championship.

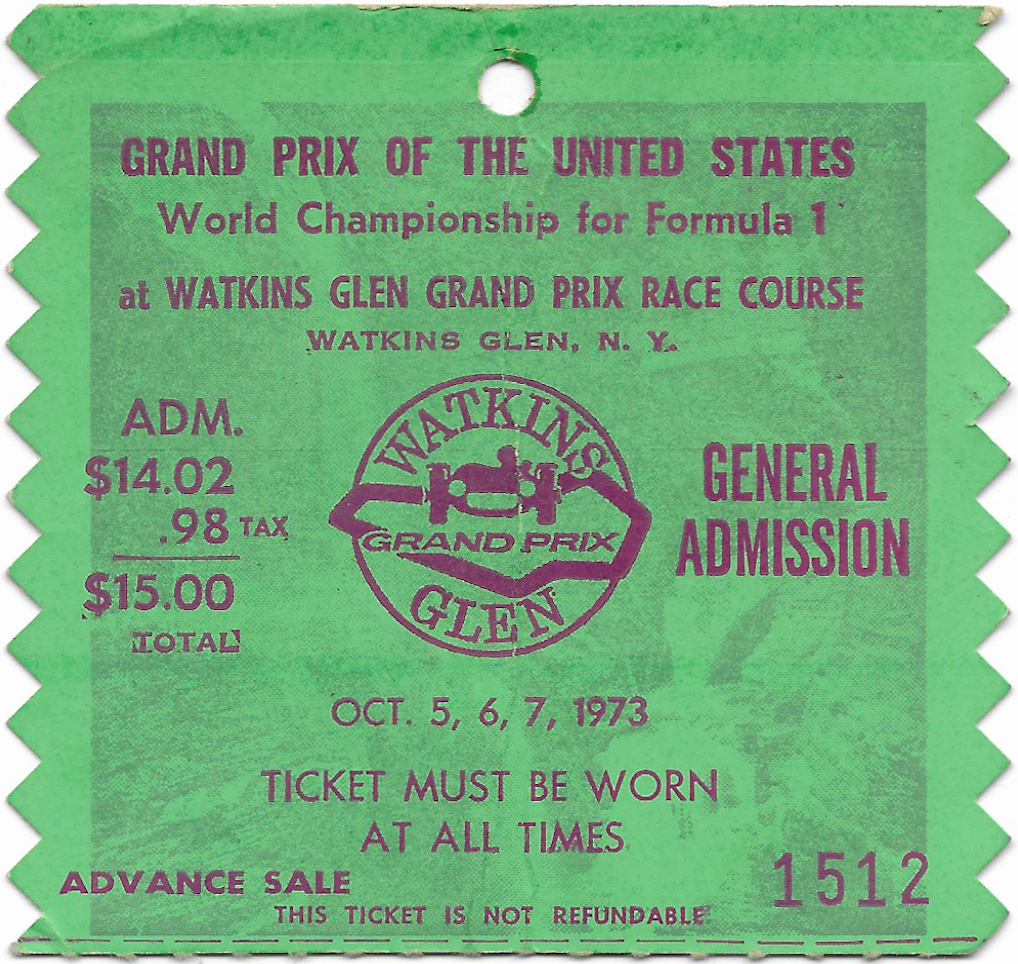
Ticket stub from the 1973 USGP

In 1971, the course was changed considerably. The entire lower section of the track was reconfigured, and a new section was constructed to add more than a mile to the course, lengthening it to 3.377 mi (5.435 km). It also saw a new pitlane and pit straight and three new corners. The improvements cost nearly $2.5 million ($13 million in 2010 dollars). The alterations made the track more popular with drivers, teams, and fans. Watkins Glen was transformed from a quick, small circuit into a fast, tough up-and-down circuit where most corners were banked and long; hard driving and maximum effort were required throughout. 1971 was the first running on the completed circuit, in which François Cevert won for Tyrrell, and the biggest cash prize in Formula One: $267,000. All of thirty drivers entered and qualified for the 1972 race, which was won by Jackie Stewart.

Stewart, unbeknownst to almost everyone (including his wife Helen), planned to retire after the 1973 race. He had won his third Drivers' Championship two races previously at Monza and he was to run his 100th and final Grand Prix. But during qualifying, Stewart's teammate and friend Cevert was killed. Going into the nearly flat out uphill Esses, Cevert lost control and struck the left side barrier at speed, vaulting over the barriers. Cevert was killed instantly. The marshals left his body in the car and threw a cover over the cockpit. A distraught Stewart and his team's manager Ken Tyrrell withdrew, ceding the Constructors' Championship to Lotus. Stewart retired with immediate effect. In the race, Ronnie Peterson in a Lotus beat James Hunt in a Hesketh-entered March to the finish by 0.6 of a second.

The 1974 event settled the world championship between Fittipaldi and Clay Regazzoni, who were tied in the standings. Regazzoni failed to score while Fittipaldi finished fifth and won his second Drivers' Championship. Helmut Koinigg crashed at the Outer Loop corner, his Surtees continued straight on and went under the barriers, killing Koinigg instantly. In 1975, a medium-speed chicane was added to the Esses to slow the cars down. Controversially, Regazzoni held up Fittipaldi for six laps to try to help his teammate Niki Lauda. Regazzoni was black-flagged, angering Ferrari team manager Luca di Montezemolo, who withdrew Regazzoni in protest. Lauda, however, won the race.

James Hunt won in 1976 while Lauda finished third, pulling Hunt within three points of Lauda going into the season's final race in Japan. Hunt won again on a wet track in 1977, holding off Mario Andretti by two seconds. The 1978 race, won by Carlos Reutemann, took place two weeks after the death of Ronnie Peterson at Monza. Gilles Villeneuve won a wet race in 1979 after Alan Jones retired while in the lead.

By this time, Watkins Glen had deteriorated. Drivers complained about the bumpy surface, and teams and press were concerned about facilities, insufficient security, and rowdy fans, who frequently committed acts of vandalism. Cars, and also a Greyhound bus in 1974, were burned. In 1978, FISA demanded the track owners make safety improvements to the track. The event was to be cancelled in 1980, but got a reprieve by FISA after promises to upgrade the facilities over the winter. Organizers needed a $750,000 loan from the Formula One Constructors' Association (FOCA) to pay prize money and other expenses. Alan Jones won the 1980 race for Williams in what proved to be the final United States Grand Prix at the Glen. It was provisionally included on the 1981 calendar, but cancelled after the debts were unpaid and government loans were denied.

=== Phoenix (1989–1991) ===
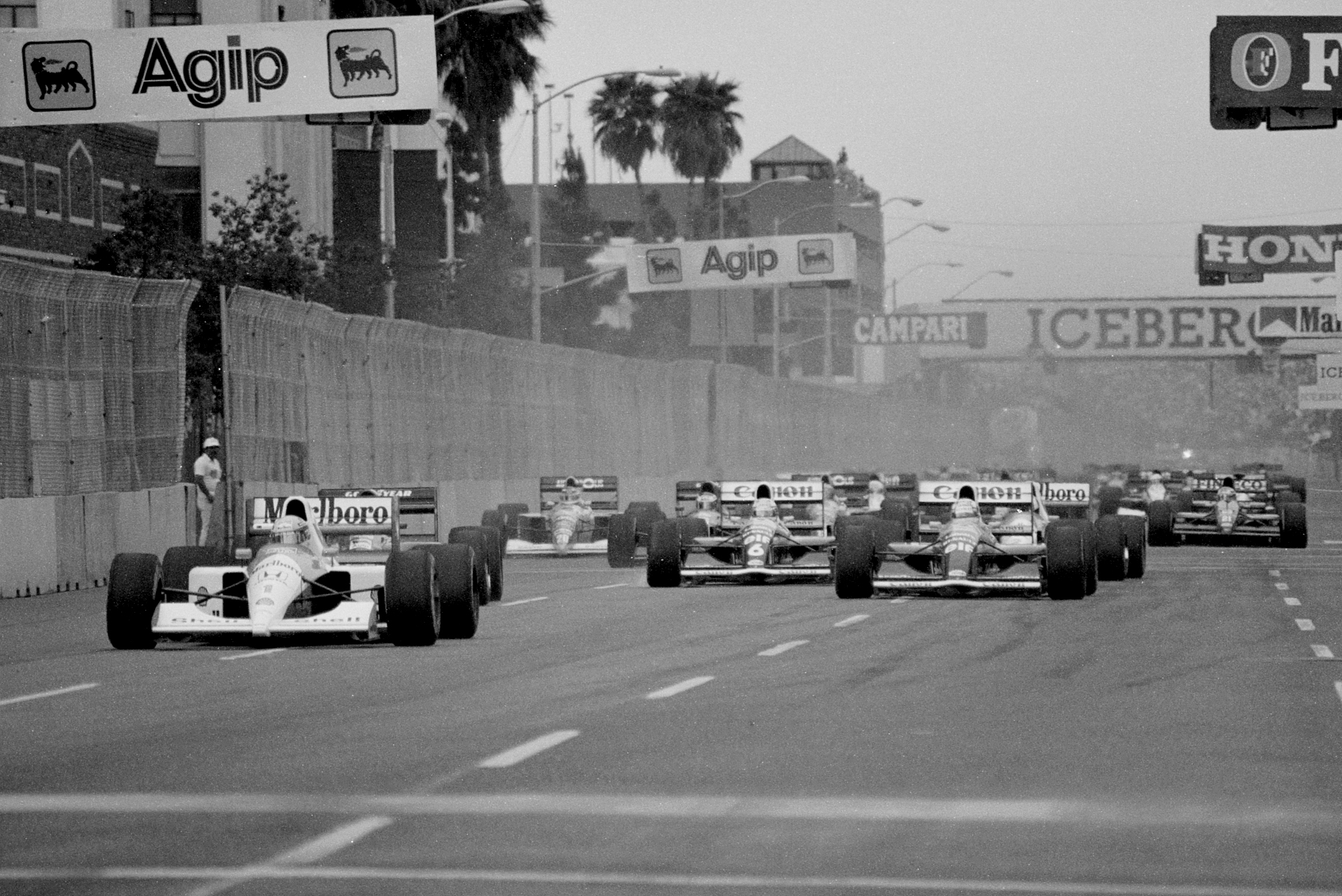
The start of the 1991 USGP in Phoenix

In addition to the United States Grand Prix at Watkins Glen, a race called the United States Grand Prix West was first held in 1976 in Long Beach, California, just outside Los Angeles. After the demise of the race at Watkins Glen, other Formula One Grands Prix in the United States were held on street circuits in Detroit and Dallas and on a car park in Las Vegas. The Detroit Grand Prix at Detroit Street Circuit lasted from 1982 to 1988; plans to continue Formula One races in Detroit at Belle Isle Park did not materialize, and in 1989, Formula One moved to the Sonoran Desert city of Phoenix, Arizona, bringing the United States Grand Prix name back for the first time since 1980. The Phoenix Street Circuit in the center of the city was unpopular with drivers and the event was largely ignored by the local populace. Phoenix, like many American cities, was designed on the grid system; the circuit was made up entirely of second-gear 90-degree corners and provided nearly no driving challenge or exciting corners to watch cars go around. The circuit was less bumpy and wider than Detroit, and its long straights made it easy to overtake and difficult to judge braking.

The inaugural event in 1989 was held at short notice and it could only be held in June (Detroit's former date), one of the hottest months in Phoenix, a city with summer temperatures regularly exceeding 110 °F (43 °C). Temperatures neared 100 °F (38 °C) on race weekend. Out of 40,000 capacity, 34,441 tickets were sold. Ecclestone expected the event to be sold out but was told that the local populace avoided outdoor events during summer. The race was moved to March, as the opening round of the season, for the next two years. The McLaren team dominated all three years, with Alain Prost winning in 1989 and Ayrton Senna in 1990 and 1991. The 1989 race saw Prost win his only Grand Prix in the United States by taking advantage of Senna's engine electronics problems. The 1990 race saw emerging French star Jean Alesi harrying Senna for a number of laps; the Tyrrell driver went on to finish second behind Senna. The circuit had to be changed for the 1991 race due to the construction of a new Phoenix Suns basketball arena, and the revised circuit was generally seen to be an improvement. Senna won the race from pole position. On October 7, 1991, members of International Auto Sport Federation (FISA) met to discuss the agenda for the 1992 Formula One season, where they voted to cancel the contract with city of Phoenix. That same year, Phoenix assistant city manager David Garcia said the city had already invested $1.3 million dollars preparing for the 1992 race and was in negotiations with Ecclestone on contract cancellation. Ecclestone was asked if poor attendance was to blame for the Phoenix race pull out; he said that attendance was never a problem but the inability to place more than 20,000 seats in a way where fans could have a better view was. There were rumors of a race on the streets of the Manhattan borough of New York City for 1992 and a race on the streets of the Las Vegas Strip for 1995, but these never materialized and a Formula 1 event would not be held in United States for the next 9 years.

=== Indianapolis (2000–2007) ===
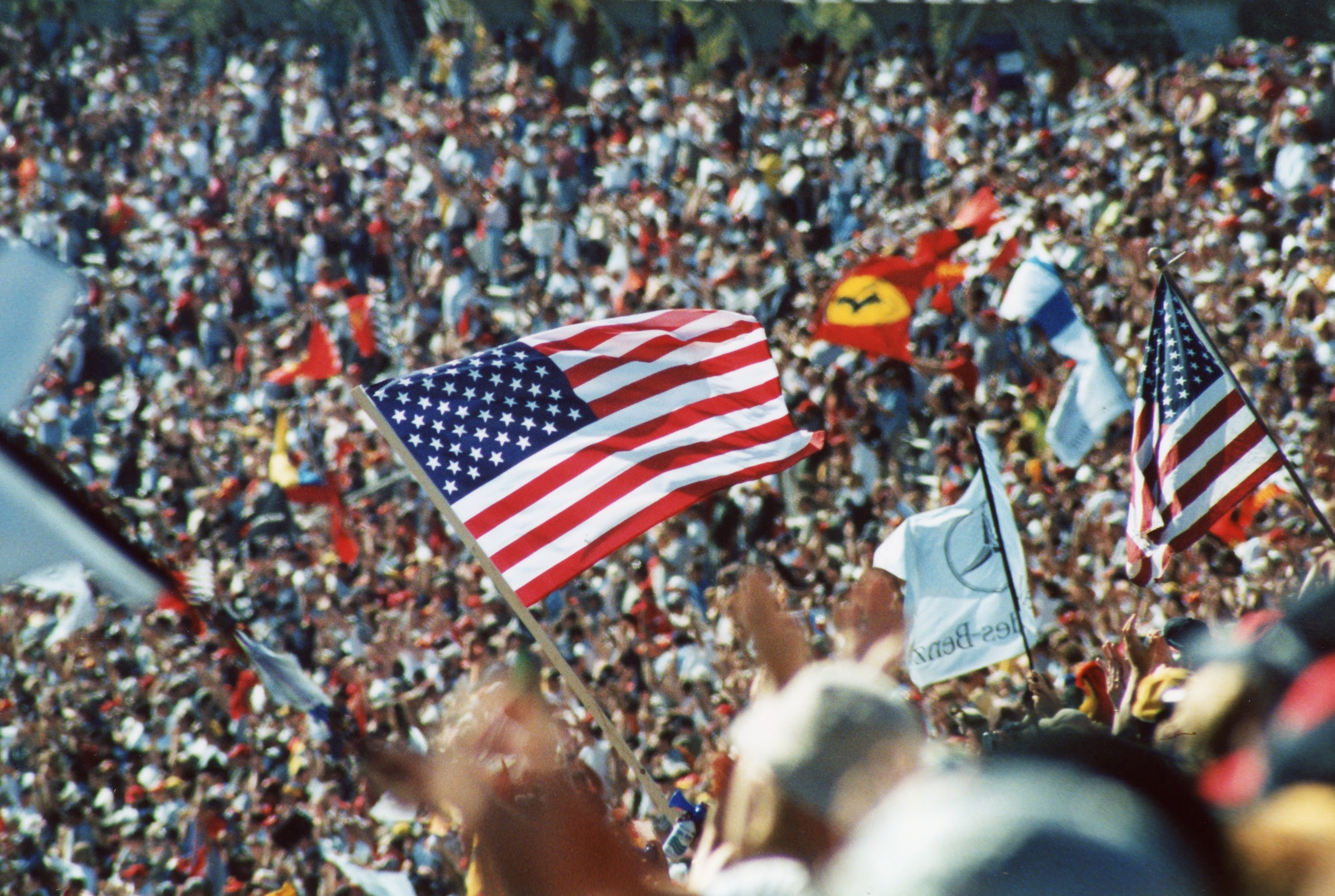
Crowds at the inaugural running of the United States Grand Prix at Indianapolis exceeded 200,000

It was not until 2000 that another United States Grand Prix took place, this time at the Indianapolis Motor Speedway. Indianapolis was rumored to have considered a Formula One race since the USGP left Phoenix; with a proposed street race for the 1990 season in downtown Indianapolis. The 2.606 mi (4.194 km) infield road course uses about a mile of the oval, but in a clockwise direction. The crowd at the 2000 race was estimated at over 225,000, one of the largest ever in F1. Michael Schumacher's win was his second of four straight to end the season as he overtook Mika Häkkinen for his third Championship. In 2001, the race took place less than three weeks after the September 11, 2001 attacks in the US, and many teams and drivers featured special tributes to the USA on their cars and helmets, and Häkkinen took his last Grand Prix win. In 2002, Schumacher and teammate Rubens Barrichello infamously swapped places near the finish line. The 2003 was held in mixed conditions and won by Schumacher. In 2005, problems with Michelin tires caused seven teams to withdraw after the formation lap. Only the three teams (six cars) using Bridgestone tires started, and the event was a farce with Schumacher claiming a third consecutive win in the United States Grand Prix ahead of teammate Barrichello with Tiago Monteiro claiming his only career podium, finishing a lap down. Many commentators questioned whether a United States Grand Prix should be held in Indianapolis again, but the 2006 United States Grand Prix went on without controversy, with Schumacher winning yet again. Lewis Hamilton won the final US Grand Prix held at Indianapolis in 2007.

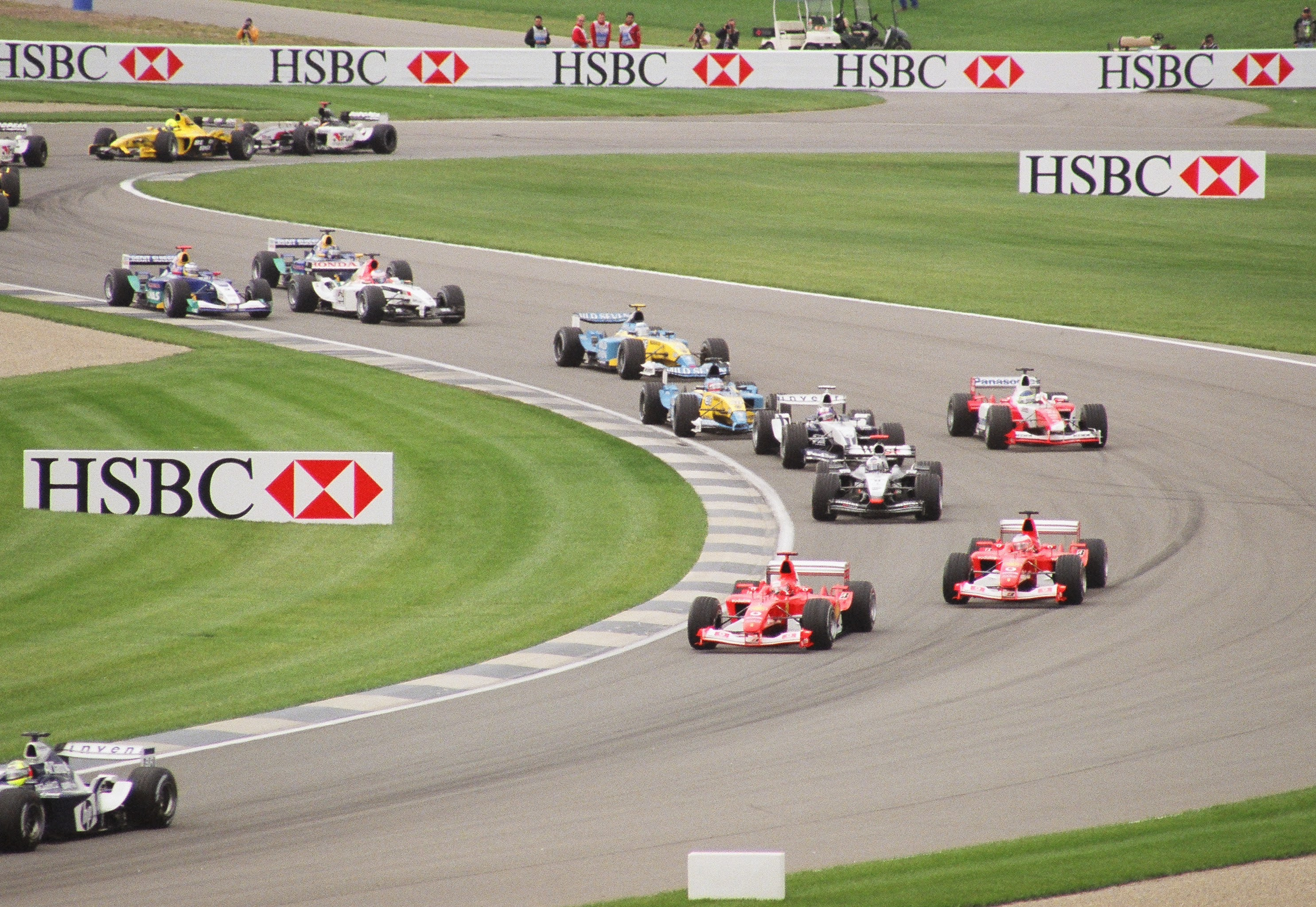
The 2003 USGP at Indianapolis

On July 12, 2007, Formula One and the Indianapolis Motor Speedway announced that the 2007 US Grand Prix would be the last one held at IMS when the sides could not agree terms. It was thought that the race would return to Indianapolis for 2009 on the track configuration that was used for the 2008 race in the MotoGP championship. Then-Indianapolis Motor Speedway CEO, Tony George, claimed that the USGP would not return to Indianapolis unless it made financial sense. Due to the expensive fees paid to host a Grand Prix, the race would require a title sponsor to be economically viable.

=== Austin (2012–2019, 2021–present) ===
In August 2009, Formula One president Bernie Ecclestone remarked that there was no immediate plan to return Formula One to the United States, vowing "never to return" to Indianapolis. Nevertheless, shortly before the first race of the 2010 season, Ecclestone continued to fuel speculation that a return to Indianapolis was not out of the question.

Various efforts were made to try to bring the race to the New York City region. In March 2010, Ecclestone announced plans to bring a Formula One race to New York City for the 2012 season. Ecclestone was quoted as saying the race would take place across the Hudson River in New Jersey, with the Manhattan skyline overlooking the circuit. In May 2010, plans emerged for a circuit to be built in Jersey City's Liberty State Park, but those plans were abandoned shortly thereafter. A race in West New York and Weehawken was later announced in October 2011. In May 2010, it was announced that Monticello Motor Club in upstate New York—a circuit complex modeled on a private country club near Monticello—had submitted a bid for the rights to host the race.

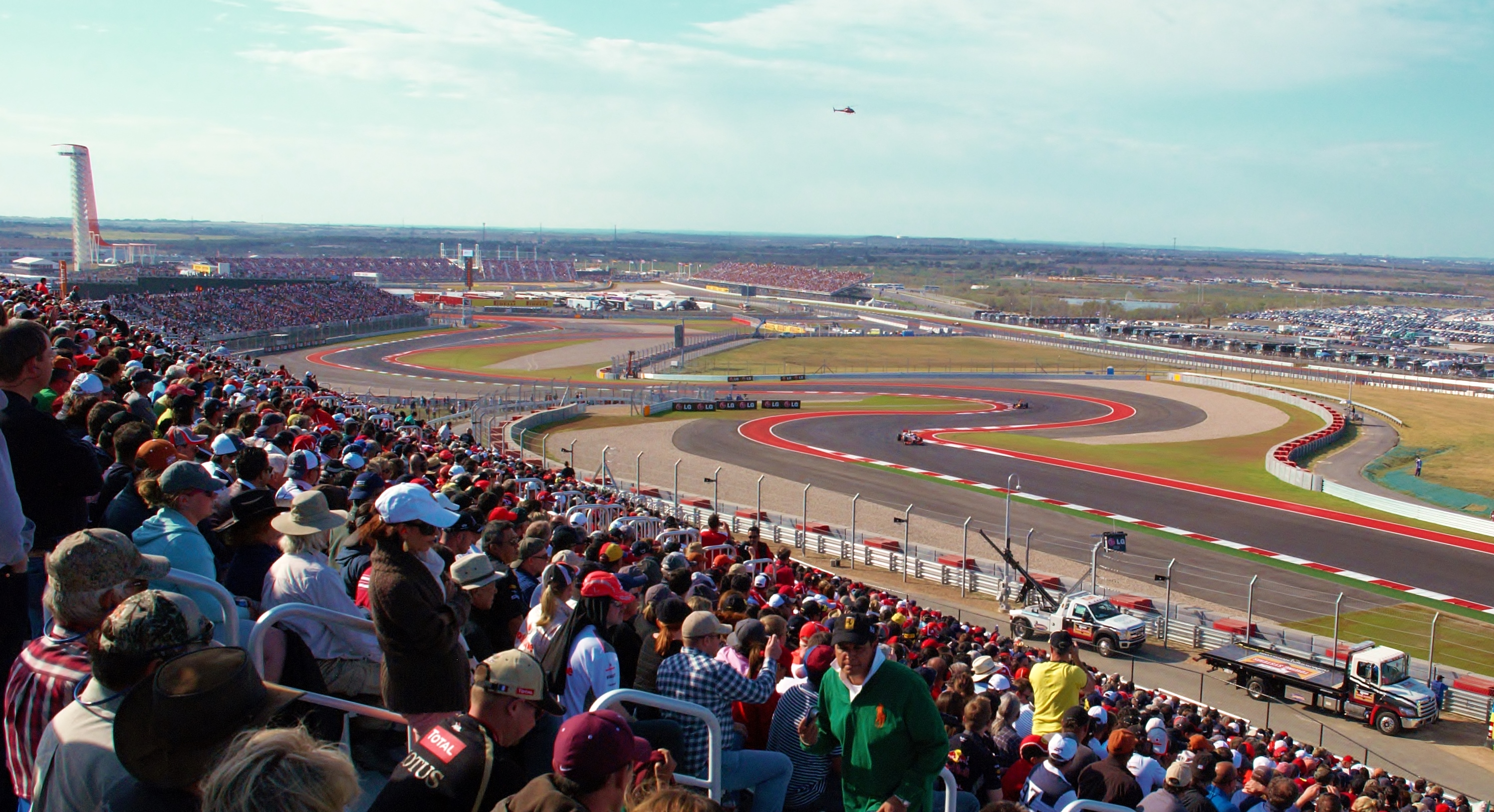
2012 US Grand Prix at Circuit of the Americas (COTA), Austin

On May 25, 2010, Austin, Texas, was awarded the race on a ten-year contract, as Ecclestone and event promoter Full Throttle Productions agreed to a deal beginning in 2012. The event is being held on a purpose-built new track, which was named Circuit of the Americas (COTA). German architect and track designer Hermann Tilke designed the new track on 800 acres (320 ha) of land to the east of the city. In July 2010, promoter Tavo Hellmund promised that the circuit would be one of the "most challenging and spectacular in the world" and that it would include a selection of corner sequences inspired by "the very best circuits" in the world.

On November 15, 2011, it was reported that construction of the circuit had been temporarily halted as the owners had not yet been awarded the contract to stage the race in 2012, following reports that Bernie Ecclestone had cast doubt on the race taking place. After Tavo Hellmund's contract was found in breach by Ecclestone and a new contract was entered into between Formula 1 and the original track investors, Red McCombs and Bobby Epstein, the US Grand Prix was confirmed to be held at the Circuit of the Americas in Austin on the original scheduled date in 2012. Reigning champion Sebastian Vettel took pole for the first race at the Texas circuit but it was 2007 winner Lewis Hamilton who kept his unbeaten run in the US as the two finished almost 40 seconds ahead of third.

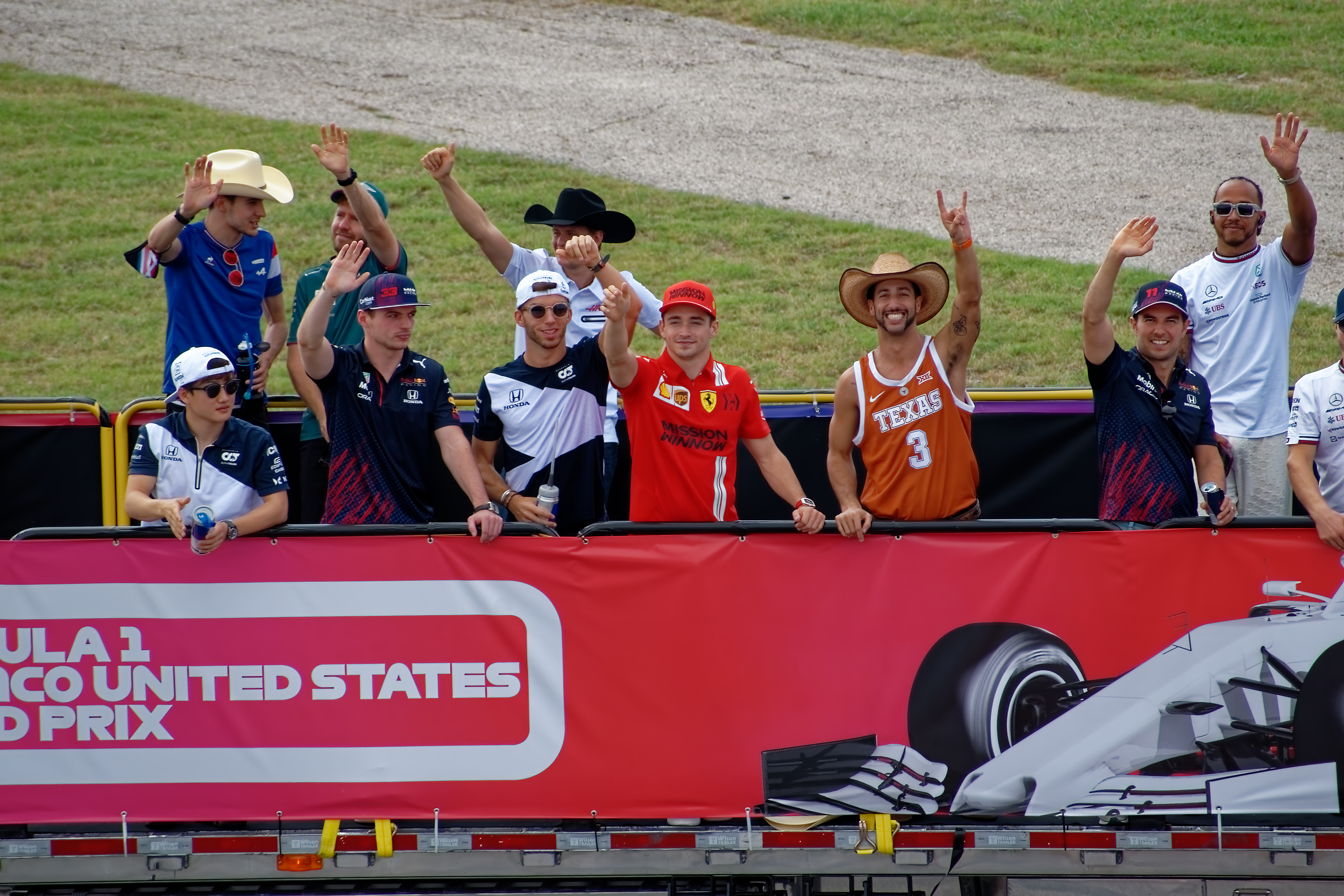
Drivers' Parade at the 2021 USGP

On November 11, 2015, the Texas government cut nearly $6 million of the required $25 million in funding to host the event. Attendance numbers had dropped to 224,011 in October 2015, for the 2015 United States Grand Prix event, after heavy rain from a quickly dissipating Hurricane Patricia. On March 9, 2016, it was confirmed the race would continue to run in Austin, despite the funding cuts. 2016 turned out to be the best-attended Grand Prix in Austin: boosted by a heated World Drivers' Championship battle between Lewis Hamilton and Nico Rosberg, good weather, and the allure of a Saturday night concert from pop singer Taylor Swift, nearly 270,000 people went through the turnstiles during the race weekend. On October 22, 2017, Lewis Hamilton won the race. Former US president Bill Clinton awarded the winning trophy. Justin Timberlake's concert helped boost the Grand Prix attendance by 40,000 over the previous year. In 2018, Britney Spears and Bruno Mars performed.

The originally planned 2020 race at COTA was cancelled due to the effects of the COVID-19 pandemic in the United States. The race returned in 2021. COTA is due to host Formula One until 2034.

== Other Grands Prix in the United States ==
The United States Grand Prix is the longest-running Formula One World Championship event held in the United States. Previously, however, there were four other separate F1 events there.

From 1976 until 1983, the Long Beach circuit hosted a newly created United States Grand Prix West, which ran in the same seasons as the United States Grand Prix (East). The United States was thus the first nation since Italy in 1957 to hold two Formula One Grands Prix in the same season. During the years 1976–1980 when both Grands Prix ran, the United States Grand Prix was also referred to as the United States Grand Prix East. The Caesars Palace Grand Prix ran as a Formula One World Championship race in Las Vegas in 1981 and 1982 (after which it continued two further years as an event in the CART series). 1982 saw the inaugural Detroit Grand Prix in the center of Detroit, Michigan, which ran until 1988. The 1982 Formula One season thus featured three Grands Prix in the United States—the first time in World Championship history that a country hosted more than two Grands Prix. Finally, a one-off Dallas Grand Prix in Fair Park, Texas, was held in 1984; it was plagued by problems with the track surface, exacerbated by extremely hot 104 °F (40 °C) July weather. After these short-lived events, the historical United States Grand Prix returned in 1989 at Phoenix and until 2022 remained the only Grand Prix on the F1 calendar to be held in the United States, despite changing locations a few times since.

A potential new Grand Prix in the New York City area was announced for the 1983 season, to be held either at the Meadowlands Sports Complex, Meadow Lake in Flushing Meadows, or Mitchel Field in Hempstead, Long Island (on the same site as the 1936 and 1937 Vanderbilt Cups). However, the race was first postponed and then cancelled, as CART started their own race at the Meadowlands, and titled it the "United States Grand Prix". The most serious effort to date to bring a Grand Prix to New York City was the Grand Prix of America at the Port Imperial Street Circuit, which was included on the proposed 2013 calendar but was then cancelled. In 2022, the first Miami Grand Prix was held at the Miami International Autodrome, a track specifically designed for F1, located around the Hard Rock Stadium in the Miami suburb of Miami Gardens, Florida. The first Las Vegas Grand Prix took place on November 18, 2023.

== Winners ==
From 1908 to 1916, the race was named the American Grand Prize. Six American drivers have won the United States Grand Prix, all except one when it was known as the American Grand Prize, which was not part of the Grand Prix calendar. Chuck Daigh also won it as a non-championship race at Riverside in 1958. But while the event has been part of the Formula One World Championship, Mario Andretti is the only American winner (1977 United States Grand Prix West, Long Beach, California).

=== By year ===
A pink background indicates an event which was not part of the Formula One World Championship.

Year	Driver	Constructor	Location	Report
1908	(France) Louis Wagner	Fiat	Savannah	Report
1909	Not held			
1910	(United States) David Bruce-Brown	Benz	Savannah	Report
1911	(United States) David Bruce-Brown	Fiat	Savannah	Report
1912	(United States) Caleb Bragg	Fiat	Milwaukee	Report
1913	Not held			
1914	(United States) Eddie Pullen	Mercer	Santa Monica	Report
1915	(United Kingdom) Dario Resta	Peugeot	San Francisco	Report
1916	(United States) Howdy Wilcox (United States) Johnny Aitken	Peugeot	Santa Monica	Report
1917 – 1957	Not held			
1958	(United States) Chuck Daigh	Scarab-Chevrolet	Riverside	Report
1959	(New Zealand) Bruce McLaren	Cooper-Climax	Sebring	Report
1960	(United Kingdom) Stirling Moss	Lotus-Climax	Riverside	Report
1961	(United Kingdom) Innes Ireland	Lotus-Climax	Watkins Glen	Report
1962	(United Kingdom) Jim Clark	Lotus-Climax	Watkins Glen	Report
1963	(United Kingdom) Graham Hill	BRM	Watkins Glen	Report
1964	(United Kingdom) Graham Hill	BRM	Watkins Glen	Report
1965	(United Kingdom) Graham Hill	BRM	Watkins Glen	Report
1966	(United Kingdom) Jim Clark	Lotus-BRM	Watkins Glen	Report
1967	(United Kingdom) Jim Clark	Lotus-Ford	Watkins Glen	Report
1968	(United Kingdom) Jackie Stewart	Matra-Ford	Watkins Glen	Report
1969	(Austria) Jochen Rindt	Lotus-Ford	Watkins Glen	Report
1970	(Brazil) Emerson Fittipaldi	Lotus-Ford	Watkins Glen	Report
1971	(France) François Cevert	Tyrrell-Ford	Watkins Glen	Report
1972	(United Kingdom) Jackie Stewart	Tyrrell-Ford	Watkins Glen	Report
1973	(Sweden) Ronnie Peterson	Lotus-Ford	Watkins Glen	Report
1974	(Argentina) Carlos Reutemann	Brabham-Ford	Watkins Glen	Report
1975	(Austria) Niki Lauda	Ferrari	Watkins Glen	Report
1976	(United Kingdom) James Hunt	McLaren-Ford	Watkins Glen	Report
1977	(United Kingdom) James Hunt	McLaren-Ford	Watkins Glen	Report
1978	(Argentina) Carlos Reutemann	Ferrari	Watkins Glen	Report
1979	(Canada) Gilles Villeneuve	Ferrari	Watkins Glen	Report
1980	(Australia) Alan Jones	Williams-Ford	Watkins Glen	Report
1981 – 1988	Not held			
1989	(France) Alain Prost	McLaren-Honda	Phoenix	Report
1990	(Brazil) Ayrton Senna	McLaren-Honda	Phoenix	Report
1991	(Brazil) Ayrton Senna	McLaren-Honda	Phoenix	Report
1992 – 1999	Not held			
2000	(Germany) Michael Schumacher	Ferrari	Indianapolis	Report
2001	(Finland) Mika Häkkinen	McLaren-Mercedes	Indianapolis	Report
2002	(Brazil) Rubens Barrichello	Ferrari	Indianapolis	Report
2003	(Germany) Michael Schumacher	Ferrari	Indianapolis	Report
2004	(Germany) Michael Schumacher	Ferrari	Indianapolis	Report
2005	(Germany) Michael Schumacher	Ferrari	Indianapolis	Report
2006	(Germany) Michael Schumacher	Ferrari	Indianapolis	Report
2007	(United Kingdom) Lewis Hamilton	McLaren-Mercedes	Indianapolis	Report
2008 – 2011	Not held			
2012	(United Kingdom) Lewis Hamilton	McLaren-Mercedes	Austin	Report
2013	(Germany) Sebastian Vettel	Red Bull Racing-Renault	Austin	Report
2014	(United Kingdom) Lewis Hamilton	Mercedes	Austin	Report
2015	(United Kingdom) Lewis Hamilton	Mercedes	Austin	Report
2016	(United Kingdom) Lewis Hamilton	Mercedes	Austin	Report
2017	(United Kingdom) Lewis Hamilton	Mercedes	Austin	Report
2018	(Finland) Kimi Räikkönen	Ferrari	Austin	Report
2019	(Finland) Valtteri Bottas	Mercedes	Austin	Report
2020	Not held due to COVID-19 pandemic			
2021	(Netherlands) Max Verstappen	Red Bull Racing-Honda	Austin	Report
2022	(Netherlands) Max Verstappen	Red Bull Racing-RBPT	Austin	Report
2023	(Netherlands) Max Verstappen	Red Bull Racing-Honda RBPT	Austin	Report
2024	(Monaco) Charles Leclerc	Ferrari	Austin	Report
2025	(Netherlands) Max Verstappen	Red Bull Racing-Honda RBPT	Austin	Report
2026	(Italy) Kimi Antonelli	Mercedes	Austin	Report

=== Repeat winners (drivers) ===
Drivers in bold are competing in the Formula One championship in 2026. A pink background indicates an event which was not part of the Formula One World Championship.

Wins	Driver	Years won
6	(United Kingdom) **Lewis Hamilton**	2007, 2012, 2014, 2015, 2016, 2017
5	(Germany) Michael Schumacher	2000, 2003, 2004, 2005, 2006
4	(Netherlands) **Max Verstappen**	2021, 2022, 2023, 2025
3	(United Kingdom) Graham Hill	1963, 1964, 1965
3	(United Kingdom) Jim Clark	1962, 1966, 1967
2	(United States) David Bruce-Brown	1910, 1911
2	(United Kingdom) Jackie Stewart	1968, 1972
2	(United Kingdom) James Hunt	1976, 1977
2	(Argentina) Carlos Reutemann	1974, 1978
2	(Brazil) Ayrton Senna	1990, 1991

=== Repeat winners (constructors) ===
Teams in bold are competing in the Formula One championship in 2026.
A pink background indicates an event which was not part of the Formula One World Championship.

Wins	Constructor	Years won
11	(Italy) **Ferrari**	1975, 1978, 1979, 2000, 2002, 2003, 2004, 2005, 2006, 2018, 2024
8	(United Kingdom) Lotus	1960, 1961, 1962, 1966, 1967, 1969, 1970, 1973
8	(United Kingdom) **McLaren**	1976, 1977, 1989, 1990, 1991, 2001, 2007, 2012
7	(Germany) **Mercedes**	1910, 2014, 2015, 2016, 2017, 2019, 2026
5	(Austria) **Red Bull**	2013, 2021, 2022, 2023, 2025
3	(Italy) Fiat	1908, 1911, 1912
3	(United Kingdom) BRM	1963, 1964, 1965
2	(France) Peugeot	1915, 1916
2	(United Kingdom) Tyrrell	1971, 1972

=== Repeat winners (engine manufacturers) ===
Manufacturers in bold are competing in the Formula One championship in 2026.
A pink background indicates an event which was not part of the Formula One World Championship.

Wins	Manufacturer	Years won
11	(United States) Ford *	1967, 1968, 1969, 1970, 1971, 1972, 1973, 1974, 1976, 1977, 1980
11	(Italy) **Ferrari**	1975, 1978, 1979, 2000, 2002, 2003, 2004, 2005, 2006, 2018, 2024
10	(Germany) **Mercedes** **	1910, 2001, 2007, 2012, 2014, 2015, 2016, 2017, 2019, 2026
4	(United Kingdom) Climax	1959, 1960, 1961, 1962
4	(United Kingdom) BRM	1963, 1964, 1965, 1966
4	**(Japan) Honda**	1989, 1990, 1991, 2021
3	(Italy) Fiat	1908, 1911, 1912
2	(France) Peugeot	1915, 1916
2	(Japan) Honda RBPT	2023, 2025

* Built by Cosworth, funded by Ford

** Built by Ilmor in 2001, funded by Mercedes

== Previous circuits used ==
Sebring (1959)

Riverside (1960)

Watkins Glen (1961–1970)

Watkins Glen (1971–1974)

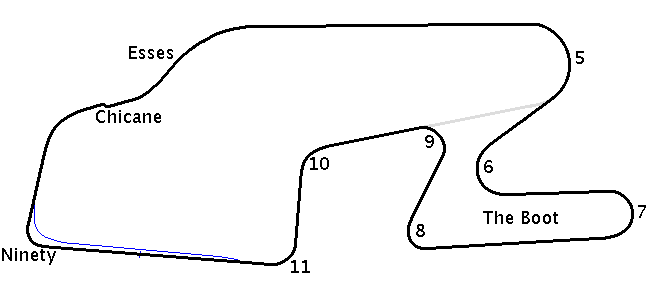
Watkins Glen (with Esses chicane) (1975–1980)

Phoenix (1989–1990)

Phoenix (1991)

Indianapolis Motor Speedway (2000–2007)
