= Santa Monica Road Race Course =

Motorsport track in the United States

Santa Monica road race course
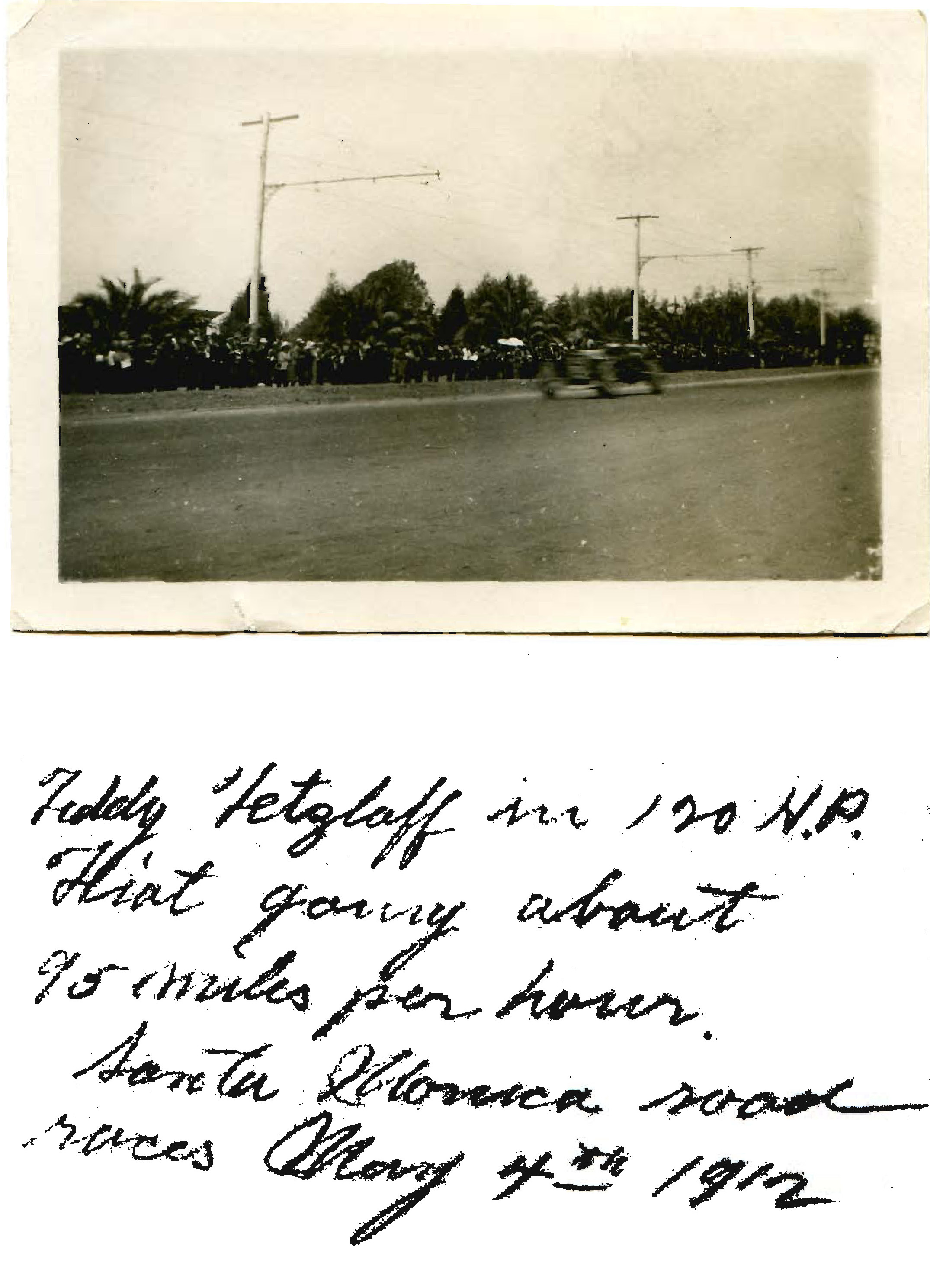
- 1912 Santa Monica road races
- Location: Santa Monica, California
- Coordinates: 34.039°N 118.488°W
- Opened: July 10, 1909
- Closed: March 15, 1919
- Major events: American Grand Prize; Vanderbilt Cup

1909–16
- Length: 8.417 miles (13.546 km)

1919
- Length: 7.36 miles (11.845 km)

The Santa Monica road race course was an American race track consisting of public roads. Established by a consortium of Southern California auto dealers who sought to promote cars, buying them as well as racing them, at a time when they were rather rare in Los Angeles, the Santa Monica road races lasted for ten years.

== Inaugural event ==
An estimated 50,000 people attended the 1909 Santa Monica road races. Harris Hanshue was the winner of the heavy-car division in an Apperson Jackrabbit and Bert Dingley won the lightweight division in a Chalmers-Detroit Forty.

== 1912 races ==
The free-for-all race of the 1912 event was won by Teddy Tetzlaff in a Fiat. He was awarded a medal for the win.

== Vanderbilt Cup and American Grand Prize ==
Santa Monica hosted both the Vanderbilt Cup and the American Grand Prize in 1914 and in 1916. A fatality occurred in practice for the 1914 event when a car crashed into the crowd and killed a spectator. The 1916 event was marred by a total of five deaths: After a mechanician had been fatally injured in practice, driver Lewis Jackson and three people lining the road died as a result of a crash during the Grand Prix race.

== Final race ==
A record crowd of 150,000 people saw millionaire sportsman Cliff Durant drive his Chevrolet Special to victory on a shortened course in 1919. Walter Melcher sustained fatal injuries when his car overturned.
