= Astor Cup (auto race) =

American auto race

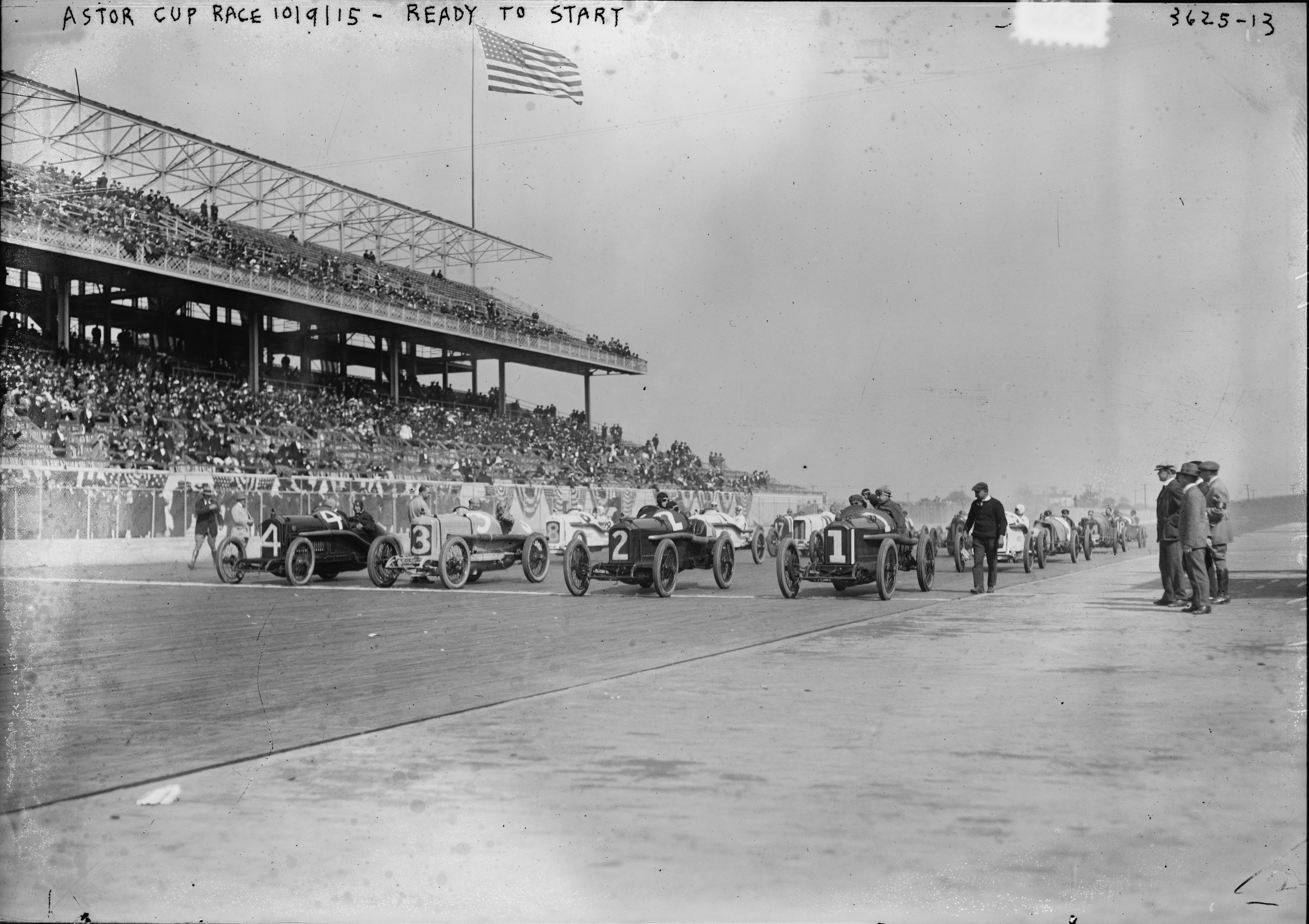
Start of 1915 Astor Cup race

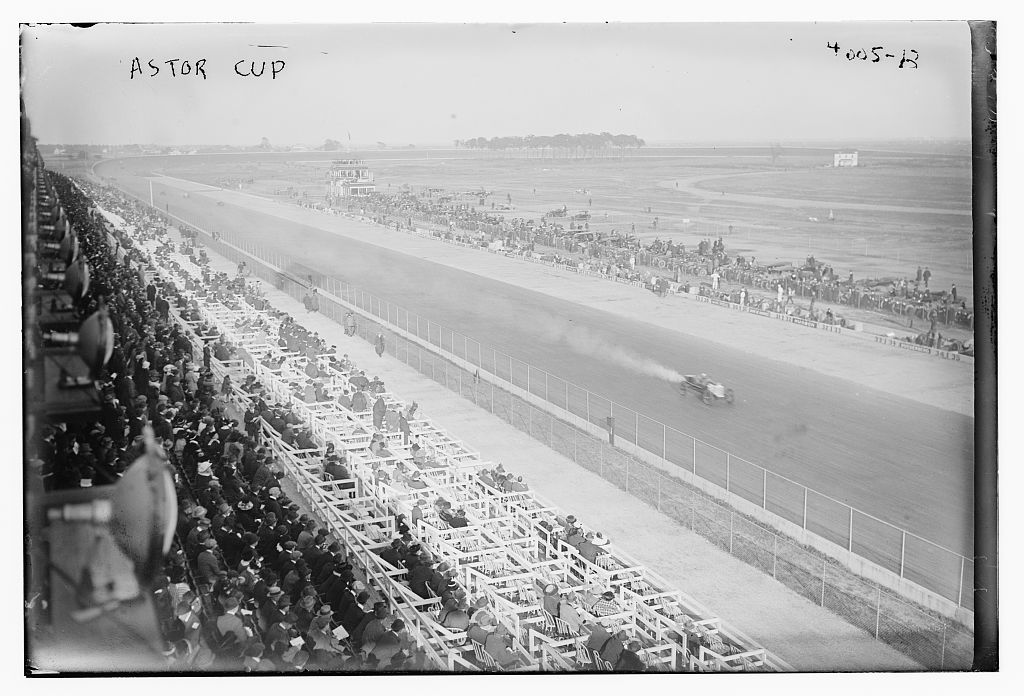
1916 Astor Cup auto race

The Astor Cup Race was an American auto racing event, first run in 1915 at the Sheepshead Bay Speedway at Sheepshead Bay, New York. The winner's trophy (the Astor Challenge Cup) was donated by Vincent Astor, whose name and connections ensured the attendance of members of New York City's fashionable and wealthy elite.

== 1915 ==
Owned by a group of Wall Street and other business investors, including Harry Harkness of Cleveland and Carl G. Fisher of Indianapolis, the Sheepshead Bay Speedway Corporation acquired the defunct horse racing facility known as the Sheepshead Bay Race Track (which had been owned by William Kissam Vanderbilt and Leonard Jerome's Coney Island Jockey Club). The purchase was completed in April 1915 and the first Astor Cup race was held on October 9 that year. Run over a two-mile (3 km) banked oval board track, the 350-mile (560 km) race was marred by the death of Harry Grant who died when his vehicle crashed during a practice run. Won by Gil Andersen in a Stutz, the first Astor Cup drew the top drivers from across the United States and Europe such as Ralph DePalma, Barney Oldfield, Eddie Rickenbacker, Dario Resta, Johnny Aitken and Howdy Wilcox.

== 1916 ==
The 1916 race was run on October 30, 1916, with Johnny Aitken winning and setting a speed record at 104 miles per hour.

The race ceased to exist after two years. Other auto races continued at the track until 1919. The Sheepshead Bay Speedway Corporation ran into financial difficulties, following the January 1919 death of Harry Harkness. The property was sold for residential real estate development.

== Race results ==
| Year | Date | Winning driver | Car | Race distance | | Time of race | Winning speed |
| Year | Date | Winning driver | Car | Miles | Laps | Time of race | Winning speed |
|---|---|---|---|---|---|---|---|
| 1915 | Oct 9 | (United States) Gil Andersen | Stutz | 350 | 175 | 03:24:42 | 102.59 mph (165.10 km/h) |
| 1916 | Sept 30 | (United States) Johnny Aitken | Peugeot | 250 | 125 | 02:23:04.03 | 104.484 mph (168.151 km/h) |

== Astor Challenge Cup ==
The original cup from the 1915-16 races is now held by INDYCAR, LLC, which is a descendant of Fisher's Indianapolis Motor Speedway, and both are now owned by Roger Penske. Two cylindrical black granite bases have been added displaying the names of all the AAA, USAC, CART, and IndyCar series winners since 1909, including the winners of the ceremonial Gold Crown championship which only consisted of one race, as well as those of 1909-1915 and 1917-1919, which were not championship points-awarding seasons. The two granite bases are not permanently attached to the trophy, and are rarely seen with it when the trophy tours. This makes it possible for it to be picked up and held by its winner.

On October 12, 2011, INDYCAR, LLC announced that the Astor Challenege Cup would be presented annually as the new championship trophy for the IndyCar Series. It was first presented to Dario Franchitti on February 13, 2012, during the organisation's State of INDYCAR address at Hilbert Circle Theatre. The winning driver and team owner are each presented with a scaled replica of the trophy during official INDYCAR business meetings. Since 2012, the trophy has been presented after the final race of the season.

== Astor Challenge Cup recipients (IndyCar drivers champions) ==
| Year | Winning driver | Car | Team | Report |
IndyCar National Champions
| 2011 | (United Kingdom) Dario Franchitti | Dallara-Honda | Chip Ganassi Racing | report |
| 2012 | (United States) Ryan Hunter-Reay | Dallara-Chevrolet | Andretti Autosport | report |
| 2013 | (New Zealand) Scott Dixon | Dallara-Honda | Chip Ganassi Racing | report |
| 2014 | (Australia) Will Power | Dallara-Chevrolet | Team Penske | report |
| 2015 | (New Zealand) Scott Dixon | Dallara-Chevrolet | Chip Ganassi Racing | report |
| 2016 | (France) Simon Pagenaud | Dallara-Chevrolet | Team Penske | report |
| 2017 | (United States) Josef Newgarden | Dallara-Chevrolet | Team Penske | report |
| 2018 | (New Zealand) Scott Dixon | Dallara-Honda | Chip Ganassi Racing | report |
| 2019 | (United States) Josef Newgarden | Dallara-Chevrolet | Team Penske | report |
| 2020 | (New Zealand) Scott Dixon | Dallara-Honda | Chip Ganassi Racing | report |
| 2021 | (Spain) Álex Palou | Dallara-Honda | Chip Ganassi Racing | report |
| 2022 | (Australia) Will Power | Dallara-Chevrolet | Team Penske | report |
| 2023 | (Spain) Álex Palou | Dallara-Honda | Chip Ganassi Racing | report |
| 2024 | (Spain) Álex Palou | Dallara-Honda | Chip Ganassi Racing | report |
| 2025 | (Spain) Álex Palou | Dallara-Honda | Chip Ganassi Racing | report |
| 2026 | (Spain) Álex Palou | Dallara-Honda | Chip Ganassi Racing | report |

== Sources ==
- http://www.champcarstats.com
- Galpin, Darren; A Record of Motorsport Racing Before World War I.
- Harry S. Harkness dies of Influenza, The New York Times, January 24, 1919
