= 1916 American Grand Prize =

Race details
- Date: November 18, 1916
- Official name: VII American Grand Prize
- Location: Santa Monica, United States
- Course: Public roads
- Course length: 13.519 km (8.402 miles)
- Distance: 48 laps, 648.934 km (403.312 miles)

Fastest lap
Driver	(United States) Ed Ruckstell	Mercer
- Time

Podium
First	(United States) Howdy Wilcox; (United States) Johnny Aitken	Peugeot
Second	(United States) Earl Cooper	Stutz
Third	(United States) Art Patterson	Hudson

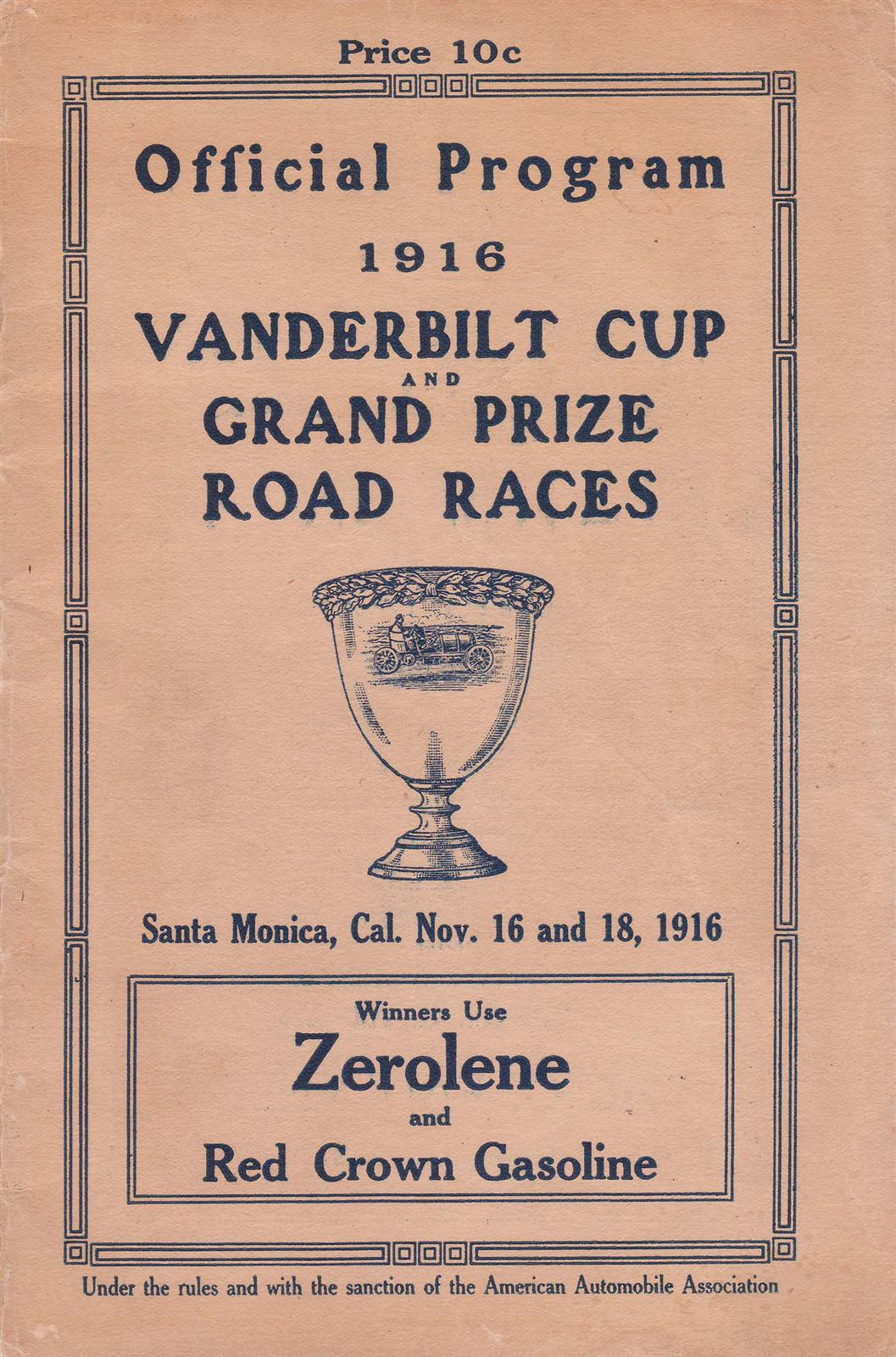
1916 Race Program

The 1916 American Grand Prize was a Grand Prix auto race that took place at Santa Monica, California, on November 18, 1916.

== Summary ==
The race was included on the 1916 AAA National Championship Trail. The race carried championship implications for Dario Resta and Johnny Aitken. Aitken led Resta by 240 points before the Vanderbilt Cup, held two days before the Grand Prize, with a 150-mile event at Ascot Park two weeks after. Resta won the Cup and earned 900 points, while Aitken was forced out on lap 19 with a broken valve. Resta held a 660-point lead entering the Grand Prize, with 1000 available to the winner. As World War I was waged in Europe, the cars were all American-entered, including two Peugeots entered by the Indianapolis Motor Speedway for Aitken and Howdy Wilcox.

Aitken's race ended on lap 1, with a broken piston, while Resta raced into the lead. The IMS team attempted to flag Wilcox into the pits for Aitken to take over the car, but the AAA officials denied them the change. By lap 9, Resta led from Ed Ruckstell's Mercer, the Stutz of Earl Cooper, and Eddie Rickenbacker's Duesenberg. On lap 13, Lewis Jackson's Marmon went through a barrier, killing Jackson and three spectators.

On lap 16, Resta experienced a misfire, and retired soon after. On lap 20, Aitken replaced Wilcox in an attempt to gain as many championship points as he could. (The AAA, however, had set a precedent at Indianapolis by not awarding points to Eddie Rickenbacker in his relief drive.) Aitken led the final 22 laps and took the victory, but Resta had all but secured the championship.

With the United States' entrance to World War I in April 1917, and board track racing taking the national spotlight, road racing in the U.S. became largely dormant. Grand Prix racing did not return until 1936, and did not become a fixture until 1959.

== Classification ==
Pos	No	Driver	Car	Laps	Time/Retired	Points
1	26	(United States) Howdy Wilcox (United States) Johnny Aitken	Peugeot EX5	48	4:42:47	438 (Note: Wilcox was awarded a number of points proportional to his laps in the car. Aitken was awarded no points for his relief drive.) —
2	8	(United States) Earl Cooper	Stutz	48	+ 6.12	520
3	20	(United States) Art Patterson	Hudson	48	+ 26:52	270
4	6	(United States) Clyde Rhoades	Hudson	48	+ 1:11:18	140
5	21	(United States) Bill Weightman (United States) Eddie Rickenbacker	Duesenberg	45	Flagged	
Ret	3	(United States) Ed Ruckstell	Mercer	39	Valve	
Ret	23	(United States) William Cody	National-Cody Special	33	Engine	
Ret	18	(United States) George Buzane	Duesenberg	27	Piston	
Ret	17	(United States) Eddie Rickenbacker	Duesenberg	27	Stripped gears	
Ret	1	(United Kingdom) Dario Resta	Peugeot EX5	19	Ignition	
Ret	9	(United States) Cliff Durant	Stutz	17	Valve	
Ret	24	(United States) Lewis Jackson	Marmon	13	Crash	
Ret	14	(United States) Sterling Price	Duesenberg	12	Clutch	
Ret	27	(United States) Omar Toft	Duesenberg	10	Clutch	
Ret	19	(United States) Ira Vail	Hudson	9	Piston	
Ret	4	(United States) Eddie Pullen	Mercer	8	Crash, fire	
Ret	22	(United States) William Carlton	Ono-Owl Special	6	Pump	
Ret	11	(United States) Mike Moosie	Duesenberg	5	Clutch	
Ret	25	(United States) Dave Anderson	Kissell	5	Valve	
Ret	10	(United States) Emil Agraz	Hercules	2	Conrod	
Ret	16	(United States) Johnny Aitken	Peugeot EX5	1	Piston	

Grand Prix Race
1916 Grand Prix season
Previous race: 1915 American Grand Prize	United States Grand Prix	Next race: 1958 United States Grand Prix
