= Hoosier Grand Prix =

- Venue: Indianapolis Raceway Park
- First race: 1961
- Last race: 1994
- Previous names: Indianapolis 150/200; Indy Grand Prix
- Most wins (driver): Mario Andretti (3); Al Unser (3)
- Most wins (team): Dean Racing Enterprises (3)
- Most wins (manufacturer): Brawner Hawk (3); Lola (3)

The Hoosier Grand Prix was a sports car, Formula Libre, and Champ Car race held at Indianapolis Raceway Park between 1961 and 1994. The race began as a round of the USAC Road Racing Championship. After being run for sports cars in its first year, the race switched to Formula Libre for the next two. After not being held in 1964, the race shifted to the USAC National Championship Trail for Champ Cars in 1965, running until 1970. The IMSA GT Championship revived the race in 1973, and again in 1994.

== Results ==
Year		Overall winner(s)	Entrant	Car	Distance/Duration	Race Title	Report
USAC Road Racing Championship
1961		(United States) Augie Pabst	Harry Woodnorth	Scarab Mk II-Chevrolet	200 mi (320 km)	Hoosier Grand Prix	report
1962		(United States) Jim Hall	Chaparral Cars	Lotus 18-Climax	200 mi (320 km)	Hoosier Grand Prix	report
Non-championship
1963		(United States) Dan Gurney	Frank Arciero	Lotus 18-Climax	200 mi (320 km)	Hoosier Grand Prix	report
1964		Not held					
USAC Championship Car
1965		(United States) Mario Andretti	Al Dean	Brawner Hawk / Ford	150 mi (240 km)	Hoosier Grand Prix	report
1966		(United States) Mario Andretti	Dean Racing Enterprises	Brawner Hawk / Ford	150 mi (240 km)	Hoosier Grand Prix	report
1967		(United States) Mario Andretti	Dean Racing Enterprises	Brawner Hawk / Ford	150 mi (240 km)	Indianapolis 150	report
1968	Heat 1	(United States) Al Unser	Retzloff Racing Team	Lola T150 / Ford	100 mi (160 km)	Indy 200	report
1968	Heat 2	(United States) Al Unser	Retzloff Racing Team	Lola T150 / Ford	100 mi (160 km)	Indy 200	report
1969	Heat 1	(United States) Dan Gurney	Dan Gurney	Eagle / Gurney-Weslake Ford	100 mi (160 km)	Indy 200	report
1969	Heat 2	(United States) Peter Revson	Repco-Brabham	Brabham BT25 / Repco	100 mi (160 km)	Indy 200	report
1970		(United States) Al Unser	Vel's Parnelli Jones Ford	Lola T150 / Ford	150 mi (240 km)	Indy 150	report
1971–1972		Not held					
IMSA GT Championship
1973		(United States) Peter Gregg	Peter Gregg	Porsche Carrera	3 hours	3 Hours of Indianapolis	report
1974–1993		Not held					
1994		(Chile) Eliseo Salazar (Italy) Giampiero Moretti	MOMO	Ferrari 333 SP	2 hours	Indy Grand Prix	report
