= IndyCar Monterey Grand Prix =

IndyCar race at Laguna Seca

Coordinates: 36°35′3.4″N 121°45′11.8″W

Mission Grand Prix of Monterey

IndyCar Series
- Venue: WeatherTech Raceway Laguna Seca
- Corporate sponsor: Mission Foods
- First race: 1983
- First ICS race: 2019
- Distance: 212.61 mi (342.163 km)
- Laps: 95
- Previous names: Cribari Wines 300k (1983); Quinn's Cooler 300k (1984); Stroh's 300k (1985); Champion Spark Plug 300 (1986–1990); Toyota Monterey Grand Prix (1991); Kodalux Processing 300 (1992); Makita 300 (1993); Bank of America 300 (1994–1996); Texaco-Havoline 300 (1997–1998); Shell 300 (1999–2000); Honda Grand Prix of Monterey (2001); Bridgestone Grand Prix of Monterey (2002, 2004); Firestone Grand Prix of Monterey (2019–2024); Java House Grand Prix of Monterey (2025)
- Most wins (driver): Bobby Rahal (4)
- Most wins (team): Team Penske (7)
- Most wins (manufacturer): Engine: Dallara (7); Engine: Honda (6)

The Mission Grand Prix of Monterey is an IndyCar Series race held at WeatherTech Raceway Laguna Seca near Monterey, California, United States. Scott McLaughlin is the defending race winner.

== History ==
The event dates back to 1960, and has traditionally been held in the fall (September or October). The event was first held as a USAC Road Racing Championship race, following the success of the SCCA's Pebble Beach Road Races. After USAC's road racing series disbanded in 1962, the race became a non-championship sports car race for three years. The race then joined the Can-Am schedule for 1966–1973. After the demise of Can-Am in 1974, the event shifted to Formula 5000 for two years, then to IMSA for two more years. This race encompasses a separate history from another event at Laguna Seca, the sports car race traditionally held in the spring.

The revived Can-Am series returned from 1978 to 1982, after which time the event became a CART Indy car race. From 1983 to 2004, the CART race was held every year in September or October with the exception of 2002 and 2003 when it was briefly moved to June. The final CART/Champ Car race was held in 2004. Its spot on the calendar was shifted to San Jose.

In 1989 and 1991, the Marlboro Challenge all-star exhibition race was part of the CART race weekend. In 1991, Michael Andretti swept the weekend, winning both the Challenge on Saturday and Grand Prix on Sunday.

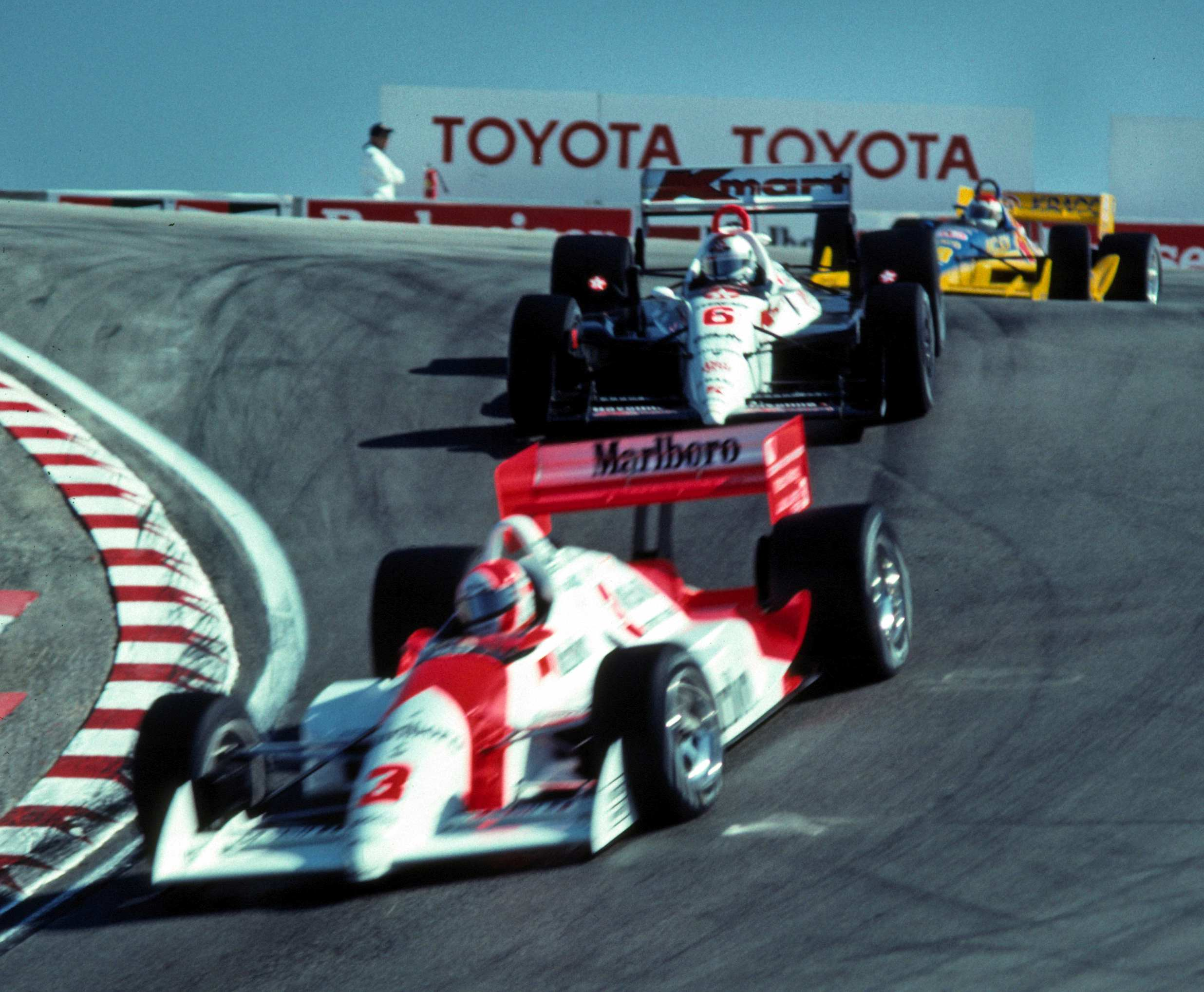
Rick Mears, Mario Andretti, and Bobby Rahal race through the famous "Corkscrew" at the 1991 race.

After a hiatus from 2005 to 2007, the race was set to return as part of the Champ Car World Series in 2008. However, after the 2008 open wheel unification, the race went back on hiatus. With the top-level Indy cars absent, and now competing instead at Sonoma, the Atlantic Championship briefly headlined at the track from 2008–2009. In 2015–2016, the track hosted the Mazda Road to Indy championship weekend. All three lower tiers of INDYCAR – Indy Lights, Pro Mazda, and U.S. F2000 participated in a standalone event. However, the top-level IndyCar Series still stayed away, and continued to race at Sonoma.

In 2018, a renewed effort to return Indy car racing to Laguna Seca was spearheaded by Monterey County and track officials. In their favor, the IndyCar races at Sonoma were said to be money-losers. Sonoma, which is also located in the Northern California region, is only about 150 miles north of Monterey by car. Sonoma held a "geographical exclusion" clause which effectively precluded IndyCar races from being held at both venues. In July 2018, it was announced that Sonoma would be removed from the IndyCar schedule after the 2018 season, and Laguna Seca would be added for 2019. The track signed an initial three-year deal and would take over the spot as the IndyCar season finale.

The logo when Firestone was the title sponsor

In 2020, due to the COVID-19 pandemic the race was to become a doubleheader, however the pandemic got worse and on July 27, IndyCar officials announced the cancellation of the race for 2020.

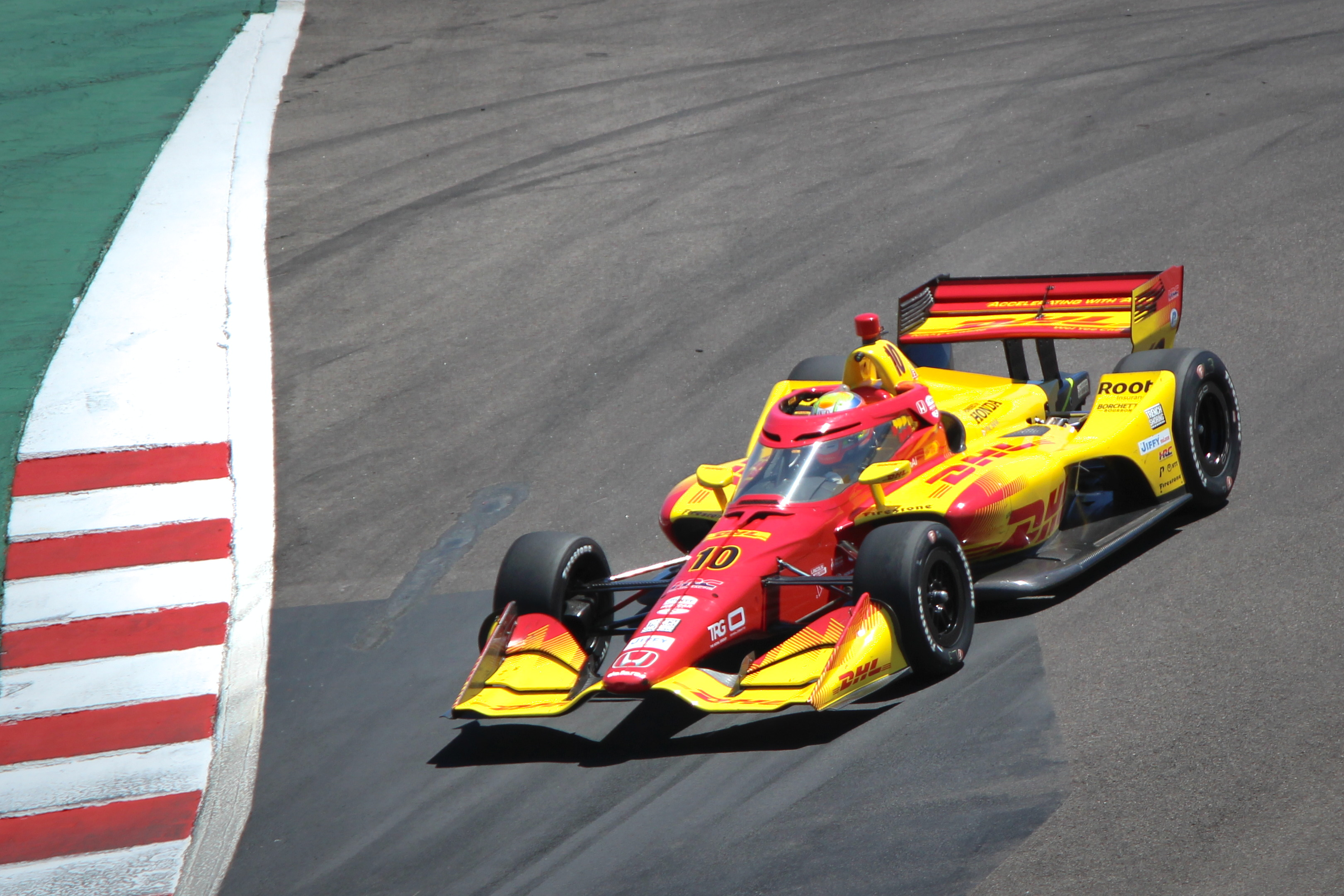
Álex Palou on the "Zanardi Corkscrew" in 2025.

Since 2025, multiple companies have taken over sponsorship rights for the race including Java House, and Mission Foods. In 2026, the race was moved to finale, replacing the race at Nashville Superspeedway and was originally scheduled to be titled the IndyCar Grand Prix of Monterey.

== Past winners ==
Year	Date	Driver	Team	Car	Laps	Distance	Report
CART/Champ Car World Series
1983	October 23	(Italy) Teo Fabi	Forsythe Racing	March-Cosworth	98	186.200 mi (299.660 km)	report
1984	October 21	(United States) Bobby Rahal	Truesports	March-Cosworth	98	186.200 mi (299.660 km)	report
1985	October 6	(United States) Bobby Rahal (2)	Truesports (2)	March-Cosworth	98	186.200 mi (299.660 km)	report
1986	October 12	(United States) Bobby Rahal (3)	Truesports (3)	March-Cosworth	98	186.200 mi (299.660 km)	report
1987	October 11	(United States) Bobby Rahal (4)	Truesports (4)	Lola-Cosworth	98	186.200 mi (299.660 km)	report
1988	October 16	(United States) Danny Sullivan	Team Penske	Penske PC-17-Chevrolet A	84	185.976 mi (299.299 km)	report
1989	October 15	(United States) Rick Mears	Team Penske (2)	Penske PC-18-Chevrolet A	84	185.976 mi (299.299 km)	report
1990	October 21	(United States) Danny Sullivan (2)	Marlboro Team Penske (3)	Penske PC-19-Chevrolet A	84	185.976 mi (299.299 km)	report
1991	October 20	(United States) Michael Andretti	Newman/Haas Racing	Lola T9100-Chevrolet A	84	185.976 mi (299.299 km)	report
1992	October 18	(United States) Michael Andretti (2)	Newman/Haas Racing (2)	Lola T9200-Ford Cosworth XB	84	185.976 mi (299.299 km)	report
1993	October 3	(Canada) Paul Tracy	Marlboro Team Penske (4)	Penske PC-22-Chevrolet C	84	185.976 mi (299.299 km)	report
1994	October 9	(Canada) Paul Tracy (2)	Marlboro Team Penske (5)	Penske PC-23-Ilmor D	84	185.976 mi (299.299 km)	report
1995	September 10	(Brazil) Gil de Ferran	Jim Hall Racing	Reynard 95I-Mercedes-Benz	84	185.976 mi (299.299 km)	report
1996	September 8	(Italy) Alex Zanardi	Chip Ganassi Racing	Reynard 96I-Honda	83	185.754 mi (298.942 km)	report
1997	September 7	(United States) Jimmy Vasser	Chip Ganassi Racing (2)	Reynard 97I-Honda	83	185.754 mi (298.942 km)	report
1998	September 13	(United States) Bryan Herta	Team Rahal	Reynard 98I-Ford Cosworth XD	83	185.754 mi (298.942 km)	report
1999	September 12	(United States) Bryan Herta (2)	Team Rahal (2)	Reynard 99I-Ford Cosworth XD	83	185.754 mi (298.942 km)	report
2000	September 10	(Brazil) Hélio Castroneves	Marlboro Team Penske (6)	Reynard 2KI-Honda	83	185.754 mi (298.942 km)	report
2001	October 14	(Italy) Max Papis	Team Rahal (3)	Lola B01/00-Ford Cosworth XF	76	170.088 mi (273.730 km)	report
2002	June 9	(Brazil) Cristiano da Matta	Newman-Haas Racing (3)	Lola B02/00-Toyota	87	194.706 mi (313.349 km)	report
2003	June 15	(Canada) Patrick Carpentier	Forsythe Racing (2)	Lola B02/00-Ford Cosworth XFE	87	194.706 mi (313.349 km)	report
2004	September 12	(Canada) Patrick Carpentier (2)	Forsythe Racing (3)	Lola B02/00-Ford Cosworth XFE	79	176.802 mi (284.535 km)	report
IndyCar Series
2019	September 22	(United States) Colton Herta	Harding Steinbrenner Racing	Dallara DW12/UAK18-Honda	90	201.42 mi (324.154 km)	report
2020	Cancelled due to the COVID-19 pandemic.						
2021	September 19	(United States) Colton Herta (2)	Andretti Autosport with Curb Agajanian	Dallara DW12/UAK18-Honda	95	212.61 mi (342.16 km)	report
2022	September 11	(Spain) Álex Palou	Chip Ganassi Racing (3)	Dallara DW12/UAK18-Honda	95	212.61 mi (342.16 km)	report
2023	September 10	(New Zealand) Scott Dixon	Chip Ganassi Racing (4)	Dallara DW12/UAK18-Honda	95	212.61 mi (342.16 km)	report
2024	June 23	(Spain) Álex Palou (2)	Chip Ganassi Racing (5)	Dallara DW12/UAK18-Honda	95	212.61 mi (342.16 km)	report
2025	July 27	(Spain) Álex Palou (3)	Chip Ganassi Racing (6)	Dallara DW12/UAK18-Honda	95	212.61 mi (342.16 km)	report
2026	September 6	(New Zealand) Scott McLaughlin	Team Penske (7)	Dallara DW12/UAK18-Chevrolet	95	212.61 mi (342.16 km)	report

- From 1983 to 1987, the course was 1.900 miles (3.058 kilometres).
- From 1988 to 1995, the course was 2.214 miles (3.563 kilometres).
- From 1996 onward, the course is 2.238 miles (3.602 kilometres).
- The 2001 race was scheduled for 83 laps but was shortened to 76 laps due to a 2-hour time limit.
- The 2004 race was scheduled for 80 laps but was shortened to 79 laps due to a 1-hour, 45 minute time limit.

=== Other winners ===
Year	Date	Driver	Team	Car	Distance	Report
USAC Road Racing Championship
1960	October 23	(United Kingdom) Stirling Moss	British Racing Partnership, Ltd.	Lotus 19-Climax	201.4 mi (324.1 km)	report
1961	October 22	(United Kingdom) Stirling Moss	UDT-Laystall Racing Team	Lotus 19-Climax	201.4 mi (324.1 km)	report
1962	October 21	(United States) Roger Penske	Updraught Enterprises, Inc.	Cooper T53-Climax	200.8 mi (323.2 km)	report
Non-Championship
1963	October 20	(United States) Dave MacDonald	Shelby American	Shelby Cooper-Ford	200 mi (320 km)	report
1964	October 18	(United States) Roger Penske	Chaparral Cars	Chaparral 2A-Chevrolet	200 mi (320 km)	report
1965	October 17	(United States) Walt Hansgen	John Mecom	Lola T70-Ford	200 mi (320 km)	report
Can-Am
1966	October 16	(United States) Phil Hill	Chaparral Cars	Chaparral 2E-Chevrolet	200 mi (320 km)	report
1967	October 15	(New Zealand) Bruce McLaren	Bruce McLaren Motor Racing	McLaren M6A-Chevrolet	200 mi (320 km)	report
1968	October 13	(Canada) John Cannon	John Cannon	McLaren M1B-Chevrolet	150 mi (240 km)	report
1969	October 12	(New Zealand) Bruce McLaren	Bruce McLaren Motor Racing	McLaren M8B-Chevrolet	150 mi (240 km)	report
1970	October 18	(New Zealand) Denny Hulme	Bruce McLaren Motor Racing	McLaren M8D-Chevrolet	150 mi (240 km)	report
1971	October 17	(United States) Peter Revson	McLaren Cars Ltd.	McLaren M8F-Chevrolet	170 mi (270 km)	report
1972	October 15	(United States) George Follmer	Roger Penske	Porsche 917/10	170 mi (270 km)	report
1973	October 14	(United States) Mark Donohue	Roger Penske Enterprises	Porsche 917/30	125 mi (201 km)	report
Formula 5000
1974	October 13	(United Kingdom) Brian Redman	N/A	Lola T332-Chevrolet	95 mi (153 km)	report
1975	October 12	(United States) Mario Andretti	Vel’s Parnelli Jones Racing	Lola T332-Chevrolet	95 mi (153 km)	report
IMSA GT Championship
1976	October 3	(United States) Jim Busby	Busby Racing	Porsche Carrera	100 mi (160 km)	report
1977	October 9	(United Kingdom) David Hobbs	McLaren North America	BMW 320i Turbo	100 mi (160 km)	report
Can-Am
1978	October 8	(United States) Al Holbert	Hogan Racing	Lola T333CS-Chevrolet	91 mi (146 km)	report
1979	October 14	(United States) Bobby Rahal	U.S. Racing	Prophet-Chevrolet	91 mi (146 km)	report
1980	October 19	(United States) Al Unser Sr.	Brad Frisselle Racing	Frissbee-Chevrolet	95 mi (153 km)	report
1981	October 12	(Italy) Teo Fabi	Paul Newman Racing	March 817-Chevrolet	95 mi (153 km)	report
1982	October 10	(United States) Al Unser Jr.	Galles Racing	Frissbee-Galles GR3-Chevrolet	114 mi (183 km)	report

=== Support winners ===
CART American Racing Series
Season	Winning driver
1986	(Italy) Fabrizio Barbazza
1987	(United States) Dave Simpson
1988	(Republic of Ireland) Tommy Byrne
1989	(United States) Johnny O'Connell
1990	(United States) Ted Prappas
CART Firestone/PPG/Dayton Indy Lights Series
1991	(United States) Mark Smith
1992	(United States) Robbie Groff
1993	(United States) Bryan Herta
1994	(Brazil) André Ribeiro
1995	(Canada) Greg Moore
1996	(Brazil) Tony Kanaan
1997	(Brazil) Cristiano da Matta
1998	(France) Didier André
1999	(France) Didier André
2000	(New Zealand) Scott Dixon
2001	(United States) Townsend Bell
IndyCar Indy Lights
2015	(United States) Spencer Pigot
2015	(United States) Spencer Pigot
2016	(United States) Kyle Kaiser
2016	(United States) Zach Veach
2019	(Netherlands) Rinus VeeKay
2019	(Netherlands) Rinus VeeKay
2020	Cancelled due to the COVID-19 pandemic.
2021	(United States) Kyle Kirkwood
2021	(United States) Kyle Kirkwood
2022	(United States) Sting Ray Robb
2022	(Denmark) Christian Rasmussen
2023	(New Zealand) Hunter McElrea
2023	(Denmark) Christian Rasmussen
2024	(United Kingdom) Louis Foster
2024	(United Kingdom) Louis Foster
2025	(Brazil) Caio Collet
2025	(Brazil) Caio Collet
2026	(United States) Josh Pierson
2026	(Poland) Tymek Kucharczyk

Star Mazda Championship
Season	Winning driver
2000	Grant Ryley
2001	Scott Bradley
2001	Marc De Vellis
2002	Moses Smith
2003	Luis Schiavo
2003	Moses Smith
2004	Luis Schiavo
2005	James Hinchcliffe
2006	Ryan Justice
2007	Alex Ardoin
2008	Richard Kent
2009	Adam Christodoulou
2010	Conor Daly
2011	Connor De Phillippi
2012	Jack Hawksworth
2012	Gabby Chaves
Pro Mazda Championship
2015	Garett Grist
2015	Garett Grist
2016	Patricio O'Ward
2016	Nicolas Dapero
2016	Aaron Telitz
Indy Pro 2000 Championship
2019	Kyle Kirkwood
2019	Rasmus Lindh
2020	Cancelled due to the COVID-19 pandemic.

Formula Ford 2000 Championship
Season	Winning driver
1991	Curtis Farley
1991	Craig Taylor
1991	Craig Taylor
1993	David DeSilva
1993	Doug Boyer
2004	Ian Lacy
2004	Ian Lacy
U.S. F2000 National Championship
2010	Scott Rarick
2010	Mikhail Goikhberg
2013	Alex Baron
2013	Scott Hargrove
2015	Nico Jamin
2015	Nico Jamin
2016	Victor Franzoni
2016	Victor Franzoni
2019	Christian Rasmussen
2019	Braden Eves
2020	Cancelled due to the COVID-19 pandemic.

Atlantic Championship
Season	Winning driver
1976	(Canada) Gilles Villeneuve
1976	(United States) Price Cobb
1984	(United States) John David Briggs
1985	(United States) John David Briggs
1986	(United States) Ted Prappas
1986	(United States) Tom Phillips
1987	(United States) Johnny O'Connell
1987	(United States) Jimmy Vasser
1988	(United States) Mitch Thieman
1990	(United States) Mark Dismore
1990	(United States) Mark Dismore
1990	(United States) Mark Dismore
1991	(United States) John Tanner
1991	(United States) Jimmy Vasser
1992	(United States) Mark Dismore
1992	(United States) Mark Dismore
1993	(Canada) Jacques Villeneuve
1993	(Canada) Jacques Villeneuve
1994	(United States) Richie Hearn
1995	(United States) Case Montgomery
1996	(Canada) Patrick Carpentier
1997	(United States) Alex Barron
1998	(United States) Anthony Lazzaro
1999	(United States) Anthony Lazzaro
2000	(United Kingdom) Dan Wheldon
2001	(United States) Rocky Moran Jr.
2002	(United States) Ryan Hunter-Reay
2003	(United States) A. J. Allmendinger
2004	(United States) Jon Fogarty
2008	(Canada) James Hinchcliffe
2009	(United States) John Edwards

CART Marlboro Challenge
Season	Date	Winning driver
1989	October 14	(United States) Al Unser Jr.
1991	October 19	(United States) Michael Andretti

== Race summaries ==
=== CART PPG Indy Car World Series ===
Track layout used through 1987.

- 1983: In front of a crowd of 50,000 spectators, the CART series visited Laguna Seca for the first time in 1983. It was the second-to-last race of the season. The focus of attention going into the race was the championship battle between Al Unser and rookie Teo Fabi. Unser (137) led Fabi (102) by 35 points, and could wrap up the title with a 5th-place finish or better. Fabi qualified for the pole position, and proceeded to dominate the weekend. Fabi led 95 of the 98 laps, only giving up the lead for a few hundred feet after a restart on lap 29, and during a sequence of pit stops on lap 63–65. Fabi beat second place Mario Andretti by 22-seconds at the finish line. Meanwhile, points leader Al Unser broke a halfshaft with 11 laps to go and dropped to 11th place at the finish. Fabi narrowed the points lead, sending the championship battle to the finale at Phoenix. Fabi also clinched the 1983 CART rookie of the year award. Two controversies flared up during qualifying on Saturday. Johnny Rutherford's qualifying speed was thrown out after officials found a taped-over pop-off valve. The team declined a provisional, and Rutherford sat out the race. With Fabi (120.169 mph) on the pole, and Chip Ganassi (118.746 mph) second, officials later discovered that they had overlooked Derek Daly's best lap of the day. Daly had turned a lap of 119.048 mph, and officials corrected the error, elevating him to second on the grid, and bumping Ganassi back to row two.

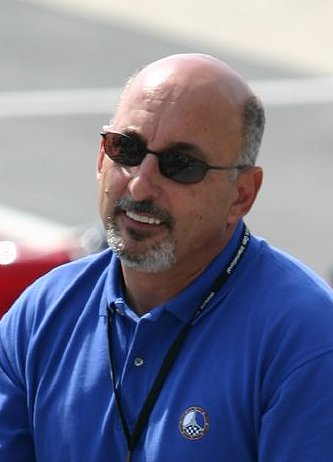
Bobby Rahal won the CART Monterey Grand Prix four years in a row (1984–1987).

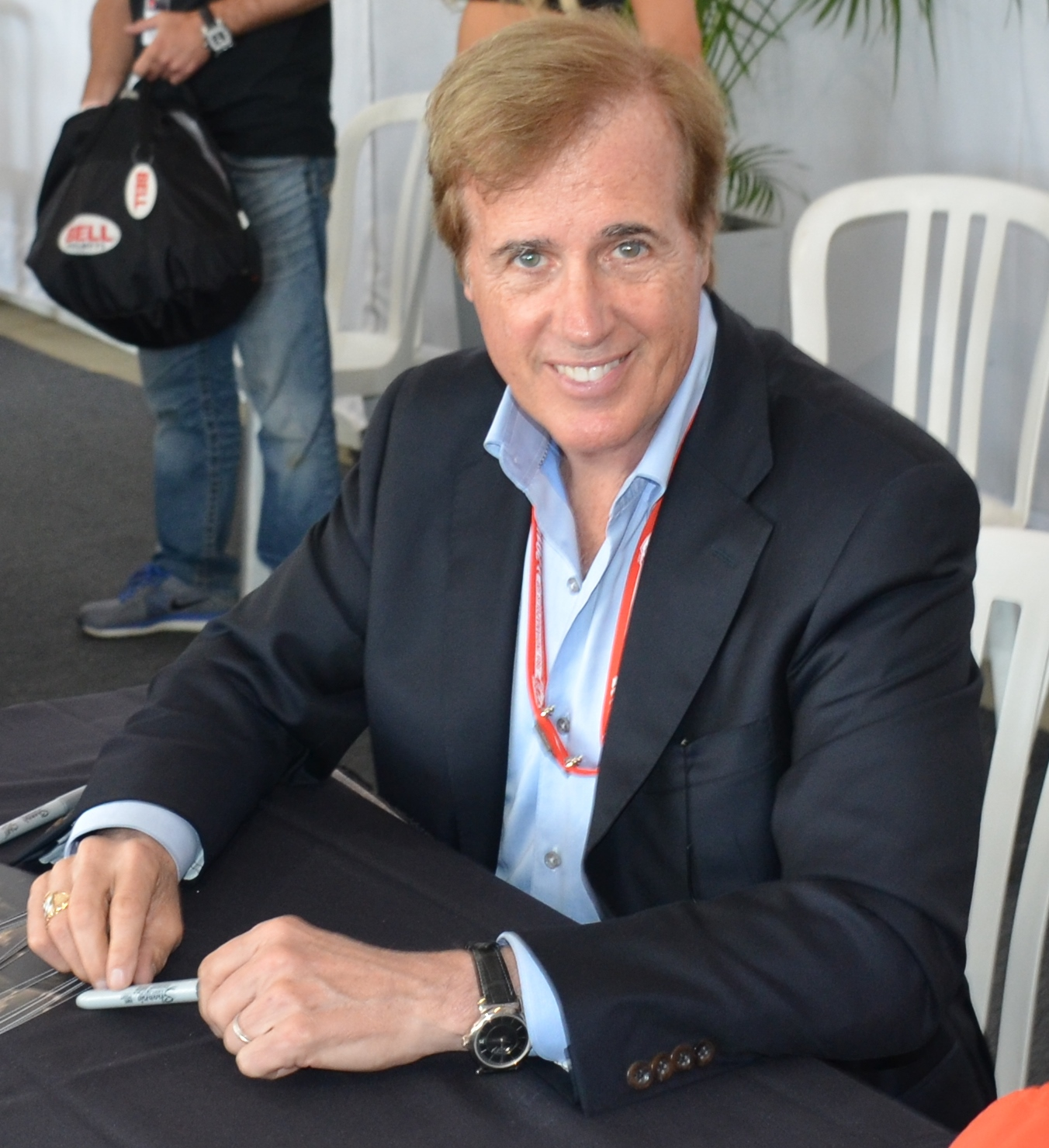
Danny Sullivan won the CART Monterey Grand Prix twice (1988 & 1990).

- 1984: In its second running, Laguna Seca was again the second-to-last race of the CART schedule. Points leader Mario Andretti started on the pole position, but Bobby Rahal took the lead on lap 20. Rahal dominated the rest of the race, leading by as many as 18 seconds. He gave up the lead for only five laps during his second pit stop. Andretti settled into a comfortable second position after contender Danny Sullivan experienced brake trouble. Andretti elected to drive an easy race, and protect his points lead. With his second-place finish, Mario all but sewed up the 1984 title. Despite winning the race and leading the most laps, Rahal was mathematically eliminated from championship contention. Tom Sneva, the only other driver still alive for the title, was two laps down in 10th place. Rookie Michael Andretti enjoyed his fifth top-3 finish of the year, and it was the first time he joined his father Mario on the podium at Indy car race.
- 1985: Bobby Rahal started on the pole and led the first 35 laps. After giving up the lead briefly during a sequence of pit stops, Rahal was back in the lead on lap 37. He stretched his margin out to nearly 29 seconds over second place Al Unser Jr. On lap 59, Tom Sneva crashed bringing out a caution. Most of the leaders pitted, including Rahal and Unser Jr. Rookie Roberto Moreno stayed out and took over the lead, with Geoff Brabham now in second. The race went back to green on lap 66 (of 98) with Moreno leading. Three laps later, however, Moreno slowed with transmission problems, handing the lead to Unser Jr., who was locked in a tight battle with his father Al Unser Sr. for the points championship. Brabham was now running second, with Rahal close behind in third. Unser Jr. and Brabham battled for the lead over the next several laps. With 12 laps to go, Brabham attempted to pass Unser Jr. for the lead in the final turn, but locked up his brakes. Unser Jr. had to take evasive action. Rahal pounced and passed both cars in one move to sweep into the lead. Moments later, Brabham blew his engine, and Unser Jr. faded with worn out tires. Rahal pulled away to a 12-second lead, and won at Laguna Seca for the second year in a row. Unser Sr. came home second, while Unser Jr. held on for third.
- 1986: Bobby Rahal won at Laguna Seca for the third consecutive year, a pivotal victory on his way to the 1986 CART title. Mario Andretti started from the pole position and led the first eight laps. Rahal took the lead on lap 9 with a decisive pass entering the corkscrew. Rahal pulled out to a mostly comfortable lead, giving up the lead only during pit stops. Rahal led 86 of the 98 laps, but had to race hard over the final twenty laps to ensure victory. During pit stops on lap 69, Danny Sullivan took over second place from Michael Andretti. Then Sullivan went on a charge to try and catch Rahal. Sullivan closed the gap to 1.41 seconds on the final lap, but he was no match for Rahal. It was Rahal's sixth victory of the season, and gave Rahal a 9-point advantage in the championship standings with two races remaining.
- 1987: Bobby Rahal won at Laguna Seca for the fourth consecutive year, and also clinched the 1987 CART championship. It was Rahal's second CART title in a row, and was mathematically clinched with still one race remaining. Mario Andretti dominated the race's early going, lapping all but the second and third place cars. Meanwhile, Michael Andretti was forced to pit multiple times with alternator trouble. Michael was second in points going into the race, and when he finally dropped out on lap 36, it effectively handed the title to Rahal. Mario Andretti blew his engine while leading on lap 67. Rahal moved into the lead, with Danny Sullivan in second. Rahal cruised over the final 31 laps, and beat Sullivan by a margin of 23.6 seconds at the finish. Also making news at Laguna Seca was the debut of the Porsche Indy car team led by Al Holbert. Al Unser Sr. was behind the wheel, but the car dropped out after only 6 laps with a broken water pump.
- 1988: Danny Sullivan started from the pole position, led 70 of 84 laps, and won at Laguna Seca. He also clinched the 1988 CART championship, with one race remaining in the season. It was the first race to take place on the new 2.124-mile redesigned layout. A record crowd of 70,000 spectators watched Sullivan take the lead for the final time on lap 61 after Mario and Michael Andretti pitted on laps 60 and 61, respectively.
- 1989: For the first time, Laguna Seca served as the CART season finale. Going into the race, Emerson Fittipaldi had already clinched the 1989 CART title, but second and third place were still up for grabs. Rick Mears started from the pole and led 47 of 84 laps en route to victory. It was the first road course victory for Mears since Riverside in 1982, and the first since he suffered serious leg injuries in 1984. It was also the last road course win of his career. In what was the final Indy car race of the 1980s, Mears also became the winningest driver of the decade with twenty victories. Mears held off a hard-charging Mario Andretti, and cemented second place in the final points standings. Mears and Andretti both pitted during a caution on lap 48 and ran 1st–2nd after leader Al Unser Jr. was forced to pit under green on lap 63.
- 1990: Danny Sullivan started on the pole position, and led wire-to-wire, winning in his final race for Penske Racing. The race was slowed by only one full course caution which came out when Willy T. Ribbs and Dean Hall banged wheels at the start. Sullivan beat second place Al Unser Jr. by 29.799 seconds. Unser had already wrapped up the 1990 CART championship, and ran second most of the day. With Sullivan well ahead, and Unser solidly in second, the focus of attention in the closing laps was the fierce battle for third between Rick Mears and Michael Andretti. With two laps to go, Mears passed Andretti in spectacular fashion along the Rahal straight. Exiting turn 6, Mears diced around the lapped car of Mike Groff and ahead of Andretti, and carried the lead to the outside going into the corkscrew. However, coming off the final turn of the final lap, Mears ran out of fuel in sight of the checkered flag. Michael Andretti caught up and slipped by Mears about 100 yards from the finish line to steal third place.

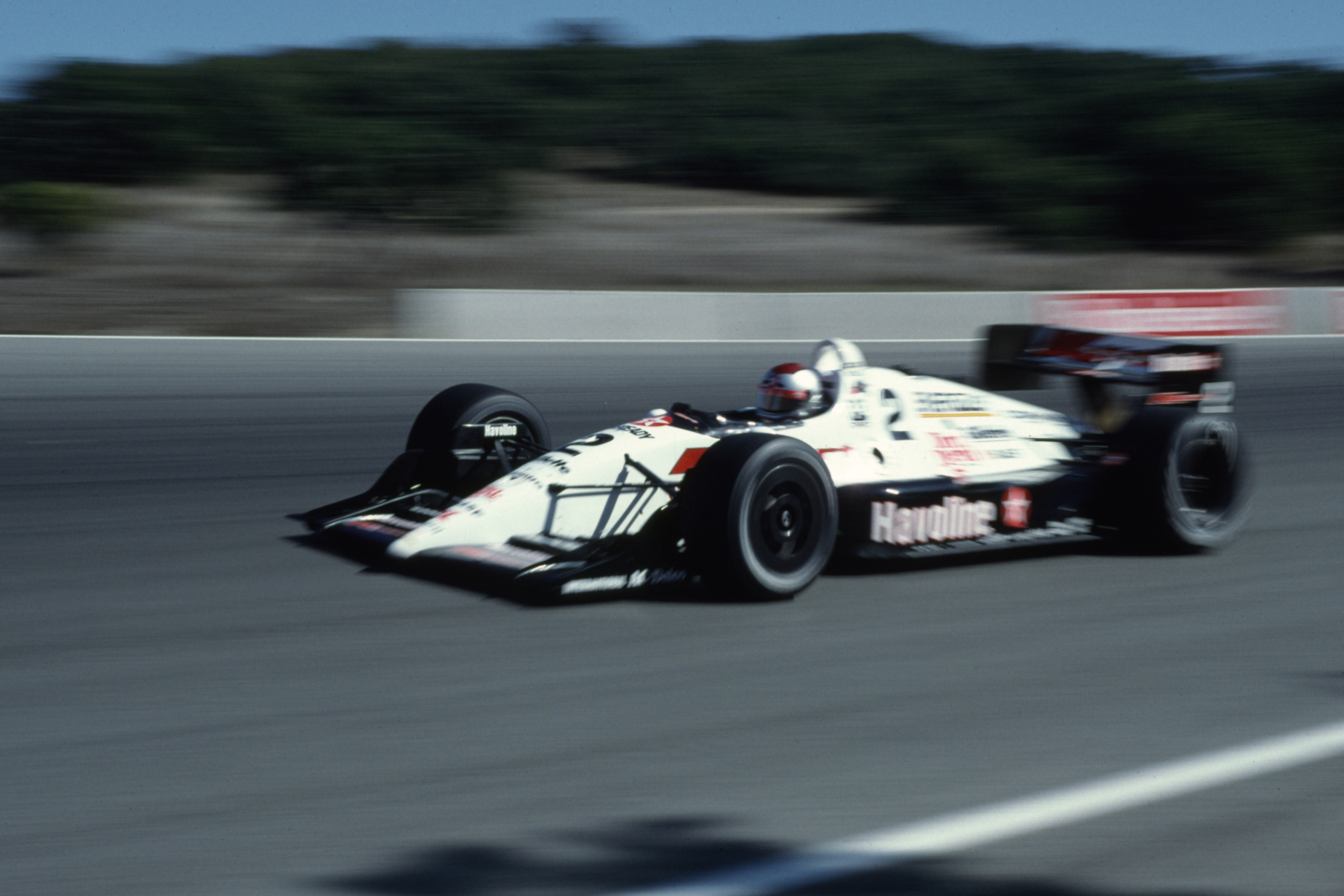
Michael Andretti won the 1991 race.

- 1991: Michael Andretti started from the pole position and led 83 of the 84 laps in a dominating victory. With the win, Andretti clinched the 1991 CART championship. It was his eighth win of the season, and first ever at Laguna Seca. Going into the race, the championship battle was down to Andretti and Bobby Rahal. Andretti needed to finish 6th or better to win the championship, and when Rahal dropped out on lap 24 with overheating problems, Andretti mathematically clinched the title. With Michael out in front, the battle for second and third was the most competitive. While running second on lap 38, Emerson Fittipaldi experienced troubles when his water bottle broke loose and fell between his feet. Al Unser Jr. got by for second, and Fittipaldi tangled with Rick Mears bending his suspension. Fittipaldi recovered, battling Mario Andretti over the final 25 laps for third. Mario held off Fittipaldi to round out the podium.
- 1992: Bobby Rahal needed to finish 4th or better at Laguna Seca to clinch the 1992 CART championship. His closest competitor in the title hunt was Michael Andretti, who won the pole position and led wire-to-wire in a dominating victory. It was Michael's second win in a row at Laguna Seca, and he finished 4.72 seconds ahead of his father Mario. With five laps to go, Paul Tracy was chasing down Michael Andretti for the lead, but tangled with the lapped car of Jimmy Vasser, and broke his front wing. Tracy subsequently went off course, and dropped out. Bobby Rahal elevated to third position, scoring enough points to secure his third CART championship. Michael Andretti won the race, but finished second in points, in his final Indy car race before heading to Formula One in 1993.

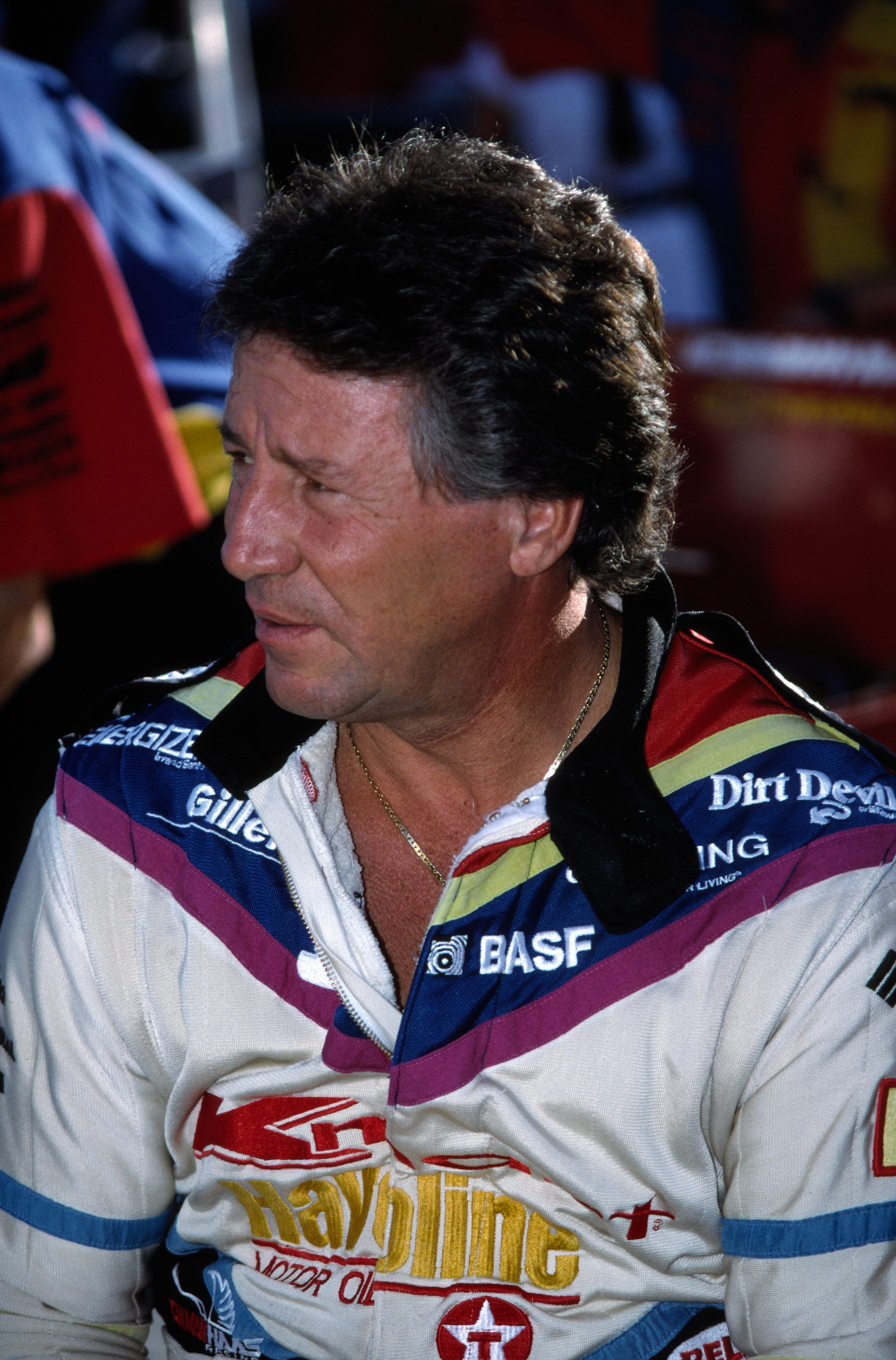
Mario Andretti retired from racing after the 1994 Monterey Grand Prix

- 1993: Penske teammates Emerson Fittipaldi and Paul Tracy started on the front row, with Tracy jumping into the lead at the start. Tracy led all but three laps, en route to a dominating victory. Tracy accidentally unbuckled his seatbelts with about twenty laps to go, and struggled to keep himself comfortable in the car, all while battling through heavy traffic. Fittipaldi closed the gap, and with ten laps to go, was right on the back bumper of Tracy. Fittipaldi, however, had a hard time getting by the lapped car of Hiro Matsushita. With five laps to go, Fittipaldi lost control and spun off course in turn five, hitting the tire barrier. He recovered and was able to re-join the race, and did not lose any positions. Tracy went on to win, with Fittipaldi second, and Arie Luyendyk third. Nigel Mansell, who had already clinched the 1993 CART championship two weeks earlier at Nazareth, tangled with Mark Smith, injuring his wrist, and dropped out.
- 1994: The attention for the day focused on Mario Andretti, who was driving in his final Indy car race before retirement. Nigel Mansell, the 1993 CART champion, was also competing in his final Indy car race, as he was preparing to return to Formula One. The morning was marked with festivities and honors for Mario Andretti. Unfortunately, he would finish 19th after suffering contact on the first lap, and a blown engine with four laps to go. Paul Tracy won the race for the second year in a row, starting on the pole and leading wire-to-wire. Al Unser Jr., who had already clinched the 1994 CART championship, stayed within striking distance of Tracy until his transmission broke on lap 75. Raul Boesel finished second, tying his career best, while Mansell finished a lap down in 8th.
- 1995: Gil de Ferran won his first career Indy car race, taking the lead from polesitter Jacques Villeneuve on lap 29. Villeneuve was forced to make an unscheduled pit stop for tires, giving up the lead, and dropped to 11th place at the finish. Going into the race, the 1995 CART championship title was mathematically down to two drivers – Jacques Villeneuve and Al Unser Jr. However, the championship points situation was complicated due to a pending appeals decision stemming from a penalty at the race earlier in the year at Portland. Unser Jr. had been stripped of victory (and docked the 21 championship points) at Portland in June. The Penske team filed an appeal, and the decision was not expected until after the season finale at Laguna Seca. Villeneuve unofficially led Unser in the points standings 169–132 (37 points ahead). But if Unser were to win his appeal, and be reinstated the 21 points, Villeneuve's lead would shrink to 17 points, putting Unser within striking distance. Villeneuve had to finish 8th or better to clinch the title outright, but managed only an 11th-place finish. Unser made a charge through the standings late in the race, but managed only a 6th-place finish, not enough to take the points lead. Villeneuve won the CART championship, despite Unser being reinstated his Portland win two weeks later on September 22. It was Villeneuve's final Indy car race before leaving for Williams in Formula One.

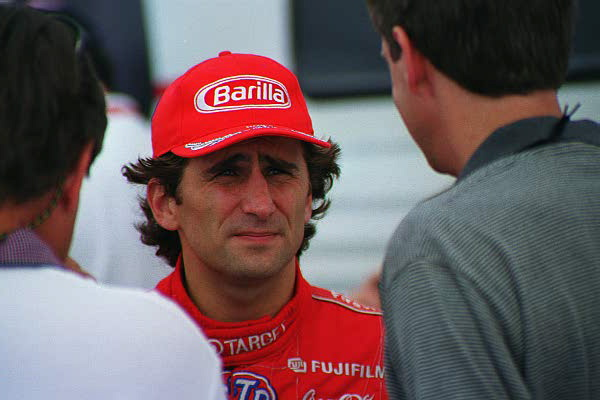
Alex Zanardi won at Laguna Seca in 1996 after the legendary move in the Corkscrew known as "The Pass".

- 1996: One of the most legendary moments in the history of the Grand Prix of Monterey, and the CART series itself, occurred in 1996. Bryan Herta led most of the race during the second half, and in the closing laps, was leading Alex Zanardi. Zanardi was in close pursuit, but Herta had been successful thus far holding him off, and appeared to be en route to his first-career Indy car victory. With Zanardi's Ganassi teammate Jimmy Vasser essentially wrapping up the series title already, the attention in the closing laps focused in on the battle for the race lead. On the final lap, the cars approached the famous "Corkscrew" turns, with Herta leading. It was a spot on the track where competitive passes were seldom, due to being a tight, blind, downhill segment. Zanardi made a daring, diving pass to the inside as Herta was under braking, and slid into the lead. Zanardi, however, slid forward off the track, and his two right wheels went into the dirt. His left wheels also nearly left the apron, as he attempted to negotiate the car through the turns. As the hill dipped, and the corkscrew turns reversed, the inside lane became the outside line. His car bounced wildly over the curbing, throwing up dirt, and narrowly missed a barrier. He swung back across the track in front of Herta, with Herta narrowly missing a collision. Zanardi was able to gather control, and astonishingly made the pass stick. Zanardi held Herta off over the final two turns, and scored an improbable victory. A surprised and dejected Herta was in total shock afterwards, naturally never expecting a pass of that nature in that location. Zanardi himself admitted it was an extremely high risk pass with little chance of success. In post-race evaluation, CART officials allowed the pass, but banned such moves in future races. The spectacular overtaking maneuver by Zanardi later became known in racing circles simply as "The Pass."
- 1997: Chip Ganassi Racing was the story of the day at Laguna Seca. Jimmy Vasser won the race, and Alex Zanardi who finished third, clinched the 1997 CART championship. Vasser led the final 58 laps, and beat second place Mark Blundell by 0.534 seconds. Bryan Herta, who nearly won the race the year before, started on the pole position, and led the first 21 laps. However, on lap 22, Zanardi went side-by-side attempting to pass for the lead on the outside of turn one. Zanardi's wheels went off into the dirt, and Herta's car also touched the curbing. That allowed Scott Pruett to slip by both of them to grab the lead going into turn 3. Moments later, Jimmy Vasser tried to pass Herta in turn 5, and Herta slid off course losing several positions. Herta would finish 6th.

=== CART FedEx Championship Series ===
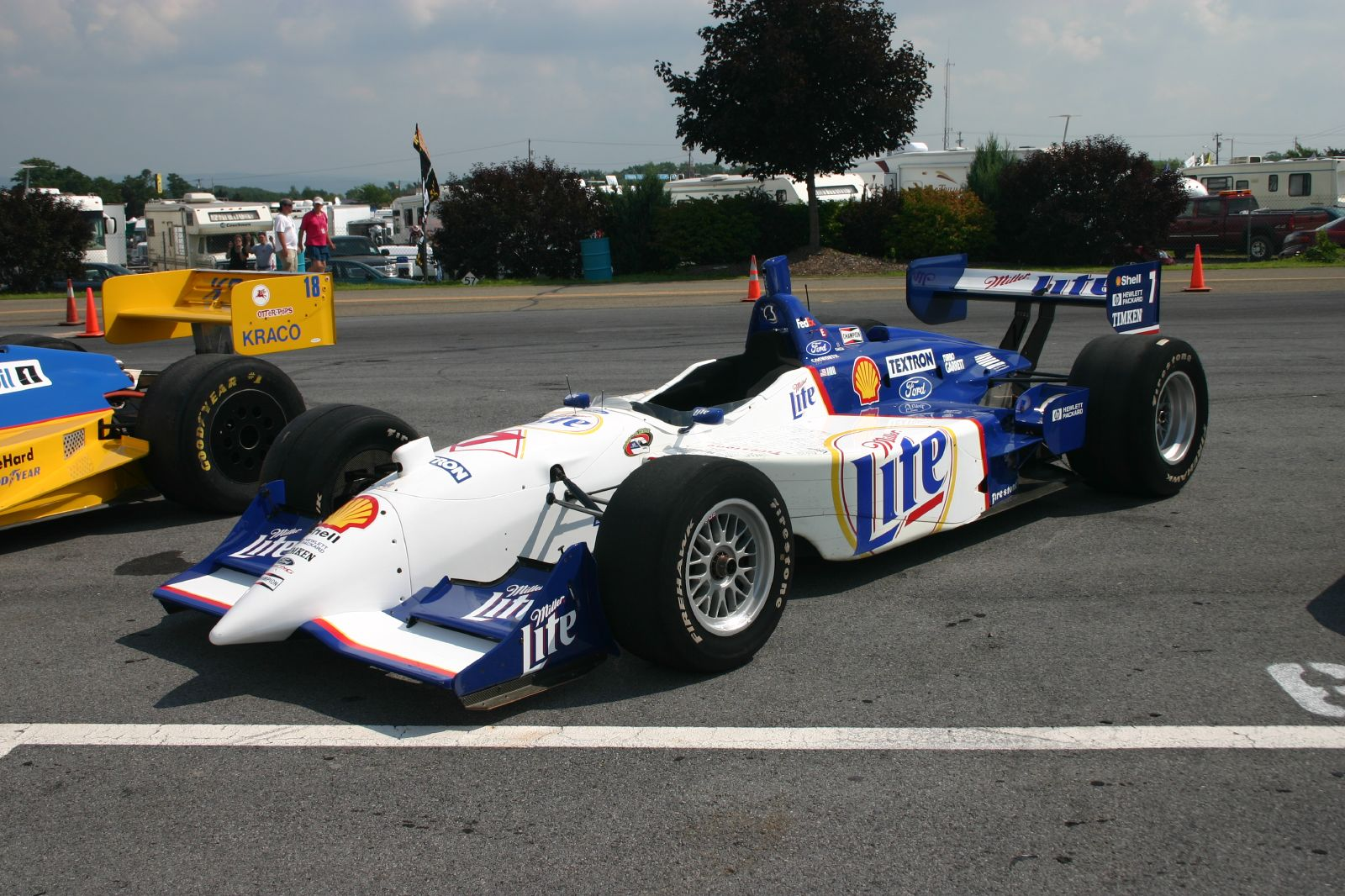
Bobby Rahal's "Last Ride" occurred at Laguna Seca in 1998.

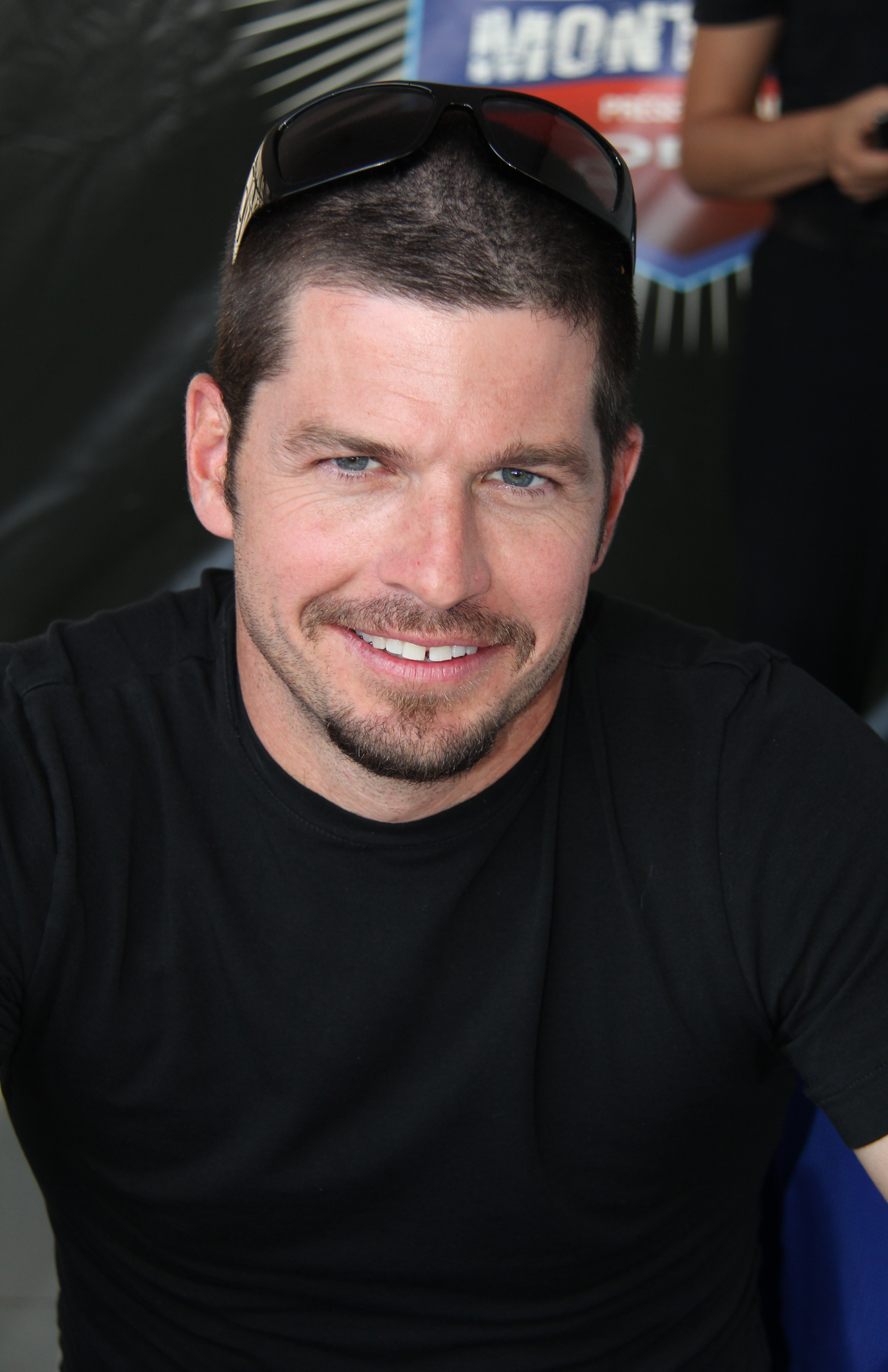
Patrick Carpentier won back-to-back races in 2003 and 2004.

- 1998: Two years after the shocking disappointment of losing to Alex Zanardi in "The Pass", Bryan Herta triumphed at Laguna Seca for his long-awaited first career Indy/Champ Car victory. The win came on the same day his car owner Bobby Rahal, in the midst of his "Last Ride" tour before retirement, drove in his final race at Laguna Seca. Herta started on the pole and led 81 of the 83 laps, but Zanardi was close behind. A bevy of cautions late in the race bunched up the field, and restart with two laps to go would decide the winner. Herta got a good jump on the restart, but Zanardi was all over his back bumper. On lap 82, Zanardi took a look outside to make a pass entering the Corkscrew, but backed out. That gave Herta just enough of a margin to hold him off on the final lap. Zanardi made one last-ditch effort on the final turn, but Herta held him off. Herta took the checkered flag by a mere 0.343 seconds over Zanardi.
- 1999: Tragedy struck at Laguna Seca when rookie driver Gonzalo Rodríguez was fatally injured in a violent practice crash. During a practice session on Saturday, September 11, Rodríguez lost control of his car entering the Corkscrew. The car went straight off the pavement and slid head-on into a concrete and tire retaining wall. The car's nose had pitched down, and the car flipped forward on impact, launching high over the wall and catch fence. The car landed hard and came to rest upside-down in a hillside area behind the retaining wall. Rodríguez was killed instantly of massive head and neck injuries. The crash cast a pall over the weekend, and Team Penske withdrew for the weekend. On race day, Bryan Herta started from the pole position and dominated the race, leading all 83 laps. It was Herta's second win in a row at Laguna Seca, in his final season at Team Rahal. Roberto Moreno finished second, his best-career finish in the CART series, gaining three spots on his final pit stop, and two more positions on the final restart.
- 2000: Penske Racing finished 1st–2nd, with Hélio Castroneves winning the race and Gil de Ferran taking over the points lead (which he would not relinquish on his way to the 2000 CART championship). Castroneves led 81 of the 83 laps, giving up the lead only once to Juan Pablo Montoya during a pit stop. Montoya fell out of contention after a pit stop on lap 48 in which his air jack collapsed. Gil de Ferran ran close behind Castroneves most of the day, and finished 0.954 seconds behind at the finish. Castroneves proceeded to climb from his car and climb the catch fence in celebration. Castroneves and the entire Penske team dedicated the victory to the memory of their driver Gonzalo Rodríguez, killed one year earlier.
- 2001: A crash-filled race, shorted from 83 laps to 76 laps due to a two-hour time limit, saw Max Papis win from the 25th starting position, the furthest back any driver has won at Laguna Seca. Papis made five pit stops (most contenders made two), and steadily worked his way up the standings, helped by the numerous full-course cautions and high attrition. At the start, polesitter Gil de Ferran grabbed the lead. Deep in the field, Kenny Brack banged wheels with Maurício Gugelmin, then was hit from behind by Michael Andretti. Moments later, Brack again collided with Gugelmin, suffering enough damage that he was forced to eventually drop out. On the second lap Alex Tagliani and Patrick Carpentier collided. A pit fire on lap 7 in the pits of Chip Ganassi Racing burned two mechanics, but the team was able to continue. Several other incidents occurred during the day, including a spectacular crash on lap 65 between Oriol Servia and Maurício Gugelmin. Servia came upon the back of Gugelmin's car going into the Andretti Hairpin, and rode over his rear wheel. The car sailed over, then the nose dug into the ground, causing the car to flip about 20 feet into the air. Servia was not seriously injured. Pitting out of sequence from the other leaders, Papis took the lead on lap 61, and held on to win as the race was ended on lap 76. It was Team Rahal's third win at Laguna Seca, and Bobby Rahal's seventh win combined as driver or owner.
- 2002: After many years of being held in September, for 2002 the race was moved to June. Newman/Haas Racing finished 1st–2nd, with Cristiano da Matta finishing 19.087 seconds ahead of teammate Christian Fittipaldi. Cristiano da Matta led 82 of the 87 laps, giving up the lead only during pit stops. A seven-car pileup in the Andretti Hairpin on the first lap was triggered after Michel Jourdain Jr. was sent spinning. Dario Franchitti and Adrián Fernández dropped out. Later on lap 16, Paul Tracy exited the pits after a seemingly routine pit stop. The left rear wheel was not properly fastened, however, and came off entering turn four on his out-lap. Tracy's car was sent spinning wildly into a tire barrier and out of the race.
- 2003: Patrick Carpentier started from the pole position and led all 87 laps to victory. At the start, as the field was coming around the final corner to take the green flag, Paul Tracy (on the inside of row two) bumped into the back of polesitter Carpentier, nearly checking-up the field. Neither car was seriously damaged, but the start was waved off until the next time around. Carpentier, Tracy, and Bruno Junqueira were running 1–2–3 when they all pitted together on lap 48. Tracy clipped an errant tire exiting his pit stall, then on the out-lap, challenged Carpentier for the lead going into the Andretti Hairpin. Tracy locked up the brakes, and could not make the pass. He suffered flat-spotted tires, and was forced to nurse an ill-handling car during the stint. With Carpentier pulling out to a comfortable lead, Tracy veered off course at the exit of turn six on lap 56, allowing Junqueira to take over second position. Junqueira charged but could not catch Carpentier for the win.

=== Champ Car World Series ===
- 2004: The final Champ Car race at Laguna Seca was held in 2004. After two years of being held in June, the race moved back to its familiar date in the fall. For the second year in a row Patrick Carpentier dominated much of the race, leading 40 of the 79 laps. The race was shortened to 79 laps from the scheduled 80 due to a 1:45 time limit. Polesitter Sébastien Bourdais led the first lap, but was in the pits on lap 2 due to a punctured tire from contact out on the track. It would happen again for Bourdais later on. He wound up 8th, but not before he went off-course on the final lap, losing 7th in the process. With the series leaving Laguna Seca after 2004, it remained one of the few Champ Car tracks in which Bourdais failed to score a victory.

=== IndyCar Series ===
- 2019: After a fifteen-year absence, Laguna Seca returned to the IndyCar Series schedule in 2019 as the season finale. Rookie Colton Herta took pole position and dominated the race en route to his second career victory but the battle for the season long championship came down to the last lap. Josef Newgarden finished in eighth, scoring enough points to clinch the season championship for a second time, even with his two close championship rivals Simon Pagenaud and Alexander Rossi finishing ahead of him, in fourth and sixth places respectively.
- 2020: On July 27, 2020, IndyCar officials were forced to cancel the 2020 edition of the race due to the state of California's ban on large gatherings because of the COVID-19 pandemic.
- 2021: The new Roger Penske led IndyCar Series returned to Laguna Seca as the penultimate round of 2021. The race was notable for its championship implications. Defending series champion Scott Dixon, his Chip Ganassi Racing teammates Marcus Ericsson and Alex Palou, Penske driver Josef Newgarden, Arrow McLaren SP driver Pato O'Ward were all in the hunt for the championship heading into season finale at Long Beach. Colton Herta took his second consecutive pole position at Laguna Seca while championship points leader Palou would qualify fourth, O'Ward sixth, Ericsson seventh, Dixon eighth, and Newgarden seventeenth. In a race that featured only one brief yellow when Alexander Rossi spun out on the first lap, Herta would lead all but one lap of the race to win from pole while Palou secured a thirty five point advantage in the championship with a second-place finish. Behind them former Haas F1 and IndyCar rookie Romain Grosjean took third place at his first ever race at Laguna Seca while O'Ward secured himself a shot at the title with a fifth-place finish and Newgarden managed to secure his shot at the title with a seventh-place finish. Both Dixon and Ericsson were mathematically eliminated from title contention.
- 2022: IndyCar returned to Laguna Seca as the season finale for the first time since 2019. In what would be the closest championship battle in IndyCar history, five drivers would head into the race with a mathematical shot at the Astor Cup; Will Power, Josef Newgarden, Scott Dixon, Marcus Ericsson, and Scott McLaughlin. Power held the points lead at just over 20 points ahead of his rivals and had to finish no worse than third to clinch the championship. Power took the pole position, breaking Mario Andretti's record for IndyCar pole positions in the process. His closest competitors for the championship, Dixon and Newgarden, qualified thirteenth and twenty fifth respectively, the latter suffering from a spin while going through the Corkscrew. More distant but still viable championship contenders McLaughlin and Ericsson qualified eighth and tenth respectively. Power led the early stint of the race before being passed after the first series of pit stops by Álex Palou, who would from then on dominate the race to take his only win of the season. Newgarden thrust himself back into contention for the championship with a furious drive from twenty fifth all the way to second place. Power hung on through the remaining pitstop sequences and one caution to finish third, clinching his second IndyCar title ahead of his rivals.
- 2023: Felix Rosenqvist qualified on pole. Rosenqvist held the lead through early caution periods before surrendering it to Álex Palou. More caution periods saw Romain Grosjean take the lead in a series of pit sequences and finally led to Scott Dixon taking the lead and ultimately holding on for his third win of the season.
- 2024: Álex Palou qualified on pole. Palou lost the lead early in the first lap to Kyle Kirkwood. Kirkwood lost the lead around lap 26 to Alexander Rossi on an overcut. The first caution of the day came on lap 36 when Luca Ghiotto crashed out, and Palou took the lead again upon the restart. Palou held on throughout two more late caution periods to keep the lead and take his second win at Laguna Seca. Colton Herta, who towards the end was running a tight fuel save, managed to hold on for second place. Rossi rounded out the podium in third.
- 2025: Álex Palou led cleanly at the start from pole and controlled the opening stint while Nolan Siegel, running an alternate strategy, cycled to the front for 11 laps before the Palou reclaimed the lead on lap 37. A mid-race yellow followed after Rinus VeeKay was forced into the Turn 3 runoff following contact from Kyle Kirkwood, but the race remained green through the subsequent pit exchanges. Christian Lundgaard gained positions through an undercut to run second, but was unable to challenge Palou over two restarts. Palou took his eighth win of the season ahead of Lundgaard and Colton Herta.
- 2026: Scott McLaughlin led from the get go from pole and never looked back to earn his first win of the season. Joining McLaughlin on the podium was Freedom 250 Grand Prix winner Kyle Kirkwood and Alexander Rossi for the first time since the 2024 race at Laguna.

Preceded by IndyCar Series at the Milwaukee Mile	IndyCar Series; IndyCar Monterey Grand Prix	Succeeded by Grand Prix of St. Petersburg (next season)
