= Lucas Oil Indianapolis Raceway Park =

Motorsport facility in Brownsburg, Indiana, U.S.

- Oval (1960–present)

- Road Course (1968–2007)
- Location: Brownsburg, Indiana, United States
- Coordinates: 39°48′46″N 86°20′27″W
- Capacity: 30,000
- Owner: National Hot Rod Association
- Operator: National Hot Rod Association
- Address: 10267 US Highway 136
- Broke ground: 1958
- Opened: 1960
- Former names: Lucas Oil Raceway (2011–2021); O'Reilly Raceway Park (2006–2010); Indianapolis Raceway Park (1960–2006)
- Major events: Current: NHRA Mission Foods Drag Racing Series; Cornwell Quality U.S. Nationals (1961–present); NASCAR Truck Series; TSport 200 (1995–2011, 2022–present); ARCA Menards Series; LiUNA! 150 (1971–1972, 1974, 1983–1985, 2011–2012, 2014–2020, 2022–present); USAC Silver Crown Series; Dave Steele Carb Night Classic (1969–1971, 1974–present); Hoosier Hundred (2023–present); Championship Saturday (2022–present); USF Pro 2000 Championship (2010–2016, 2018–present); USF2000 Championship (2010–2016, 2018–present); Formula D (2026); Former: USAC Championship Car; Hoosier Grand Prix (1961–1963, 1965–1970, 1973, 1994); USAC Stock Car; Yankee 300 (1963–1972); NASCAR Nationwide Series; Kroger 200 (1982–2011); Hooters Pro Cup Series (2001–2002, 2004–2006); Superstar Racing Experience (2021)
- Website: raceirp.com

Oval (1960–present)
- Surface: Asphalt
- Length: 0.686 mi (1.104 km)
- Turns: 4
- Banking: 12°
- Race lap record: 0:19.7522 ( (United States) Braden Eves, Tatuus IP-22, 2024, USF Pro 2000)

Road Course (1968–present)
- Surface: Asphalt
- Length: 2.500 mi (4.023 km)
- Turns: 15
- Race lap record: 1:23.622 ( (Chile) Eliseo Salazar, Ferrari 333 SP, 1994, WSC)

Drag Strip
- Surface: Concrete/Asphalt
- Length: 0.250 mi (0.402 km)

Lucas Oil Indianapolis Raceway Park (formerly Indianapolis Raceway Park, O'Reilly Raceway Park at Indianapolis, and Lucas Oil Raceway) is an auto racing facility in Brownsburg, Indiana, United States, about 10 mi (16 km) northwest of downtown Indianapolis. It includes a 0.686 mi (1.104 km) oval track, a 2.500 mi (4.023 km) road course (which has fallen into disrepair and is no longer used), and a 4,400 ft (1,300 m) drag strip which is among the premier drag racing venues in the world. The complex receives about 500,000 visitors annually.

== History ==
The track was known as Lucas Oil Raceway from 2011 to 2021

In 1958, 15 Indianapolis-area businessmen and racing professionals led by Tom Binford, Frank Dickie, Rodger Ward, and Howard Fieber invested $5,000 each to fund the development of a 267-acre (108 ha) farm tract into a recreational sporting complex that would focus on auto racing. The original intention was to create a 15-turn, 2.500 mi (4.023 km) road course, but as an insurance measure against economic problems, the investment group decided to incorporate a quarter-mile drag strip into the long straightaway of the road course design. Constructed with assistance from the National Hot Rod Association (NHRA), the drag strip was the first to be completed, with the facility's first event held on the strip in the fall of 1960. The facility was called Indianapolis Raceway Park. A year later, a 0.686-mile (1.104 km) paved oval was completed to finish off the track capabilities of the complex. The oval track was used as-is until an overall track renovation was completed in 1988 in order to increase speed on the track.

The premier feature of Lucas Oil Raceway is a 4,400-foot (1,300 m) long drag strip. The single NHRA event held at the facility is the oldest and most prestigious of the series. The NHRA U.S. Nationals, held every year during the Labor Day weekend, is the only event on the NHRA schedule with final eliminations scheduled on a Monday. An all-star style race, called the Traxxas Nitro Shootout, is held for the two nitro divisions (Top Fuel on Saturday and Funny Car on Sunday). The winners in each division win $100,000 US, while the race itself has the largest purse of any NHRA sanctioned event at over $250,000 US. The drag strip has held the event every year since 1961, when the race was moved from Detroit.

Sprint and midget races are held on the oval, along with other events suited to a shorter track. Raceway Park traditionally stages an extensive program on the Saturday nights of major races at the Indianapolis Motor Speedway. On Memorial Day weekend, the venue hosts a USAC Silver Crown, Sprint Car and Midget Car event, serving as something of an unofficial preliminary event to the Indianapolis 500. It was previously held on Saturday Night under the name Night before the 500, and is currently held on Friday night as the Carb Night Classic. Similarly, the NASCAR Nationwide Series Kroger 200 was given a "Night before the 400" status; a Truck Series race was added to the weekend in 1995. When Formula One raced at IMS, midget, sprint, and stock car races were held at ORP in the "Night Before F1" meets, including the 2002 and 2003 USGP races that featured a twin 25-lap midget format, with a full inversion, and the winner winning $50,000 if they could win both features.

The 15-turn road course was used by the Indianapolis area Sports Car Club of America road racing events. The initial Indianapolis Raceway Park road race was an SCCA event held in 1961. In 1965, rookie driver Mario Andretti won his first Indy car race on the road course, in an event that was historic in that it was the first time in modern history that American Indy cars raced on a road circuit. For the next six years, the road course hosted the Hoosier Grand Prix, a round of the USAC National Championship Series, the same series that included the Indianapolis 500, as well as the USAC Stock Car series, including the Yankee 300. Notably, in the 1969 movie Winning, Paul Newman's character, Frank Capua, competes in a USAC Stock Car event on the road course.

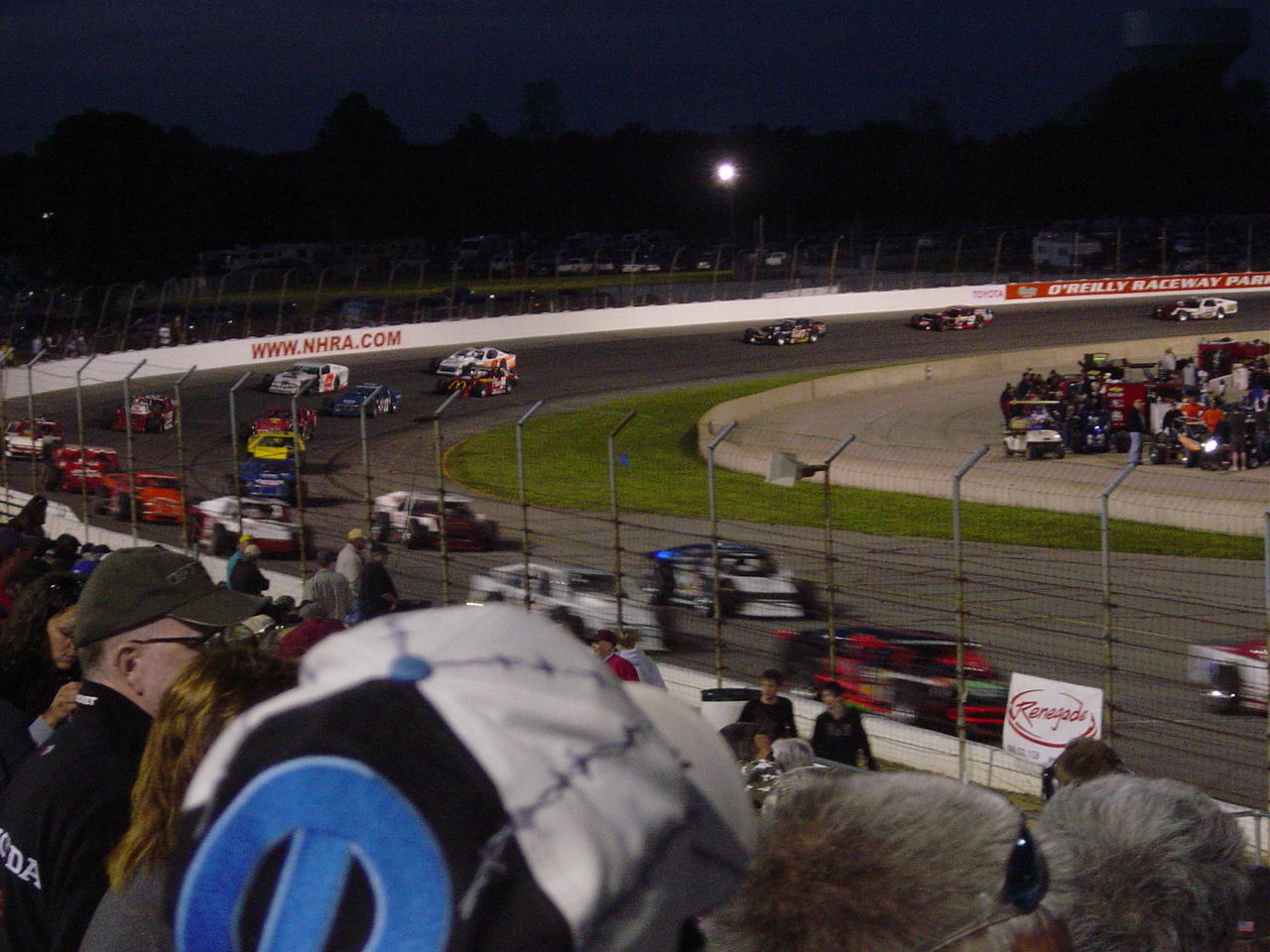
The track in 2008

After an insurance investigation of the pit out opening for the road course, which is located along the left lane wall of the drag strip, the insurance carrier demanded the pit out be closed off with a permanent concrete wall. This effectively meant closing the road course for competition purposes, as there is no other area on the current track layout suitable to relocate a viable pit lane. However, club racing and private testing used a section of track that runs parallel to the backstretch of the oval (Turns 6–8) as a makeshift pit, although enough section of the return road for the drag strip could also be used if realigned. The last SCCA club road race was held in 2007. The road course surface is in disrepair and very bumpy, and would need improvement to be of use again. There are plans to redesign and renovate the road course, but track officials say it is a long-term goal.

In 2012, it was announced that the NASCAR Nationwide Series race at Lucas Oil Raceway would move to Indianapolis Motor Speedway as the Indiana 250 to replace the Kroger 200, and that it would be joined by Rolex Sports Car Series and Continental Tire Sports Car Challenge races under the banner "Super Weekend at the Brickyard". The Camping World Truck Series event was replaced with a new event at Eldora Speedway. As a result, the ARCA Racing Series became the lone national stock car racing series to sanction a race at the track, running its own 200-lap event. NASCAR announced in September 2021 that the Truck Series would return to Lucas Oil Raceway in 2022 as the first playoff race, marking the return by NASCAR after an eleven-year absence. On December 8, 2021, the track announced the track's renaming to Lucas Oil Indianapolis Raceway Park.

== Records ==
As of May 2024, the fastest lap records at Indianapolis Raceway Park are listed as:

=== 0.686-mile oval ===
- USF Pro 2000 Championship Qualifying: Braden Eves, 19.4602 sec. = 126.565 mph (203.687 km/h), May 23, 2024
- SCCA Formula Super Vee Qualifying: Mark Smith, 19.581 sec. = 126.122 mph (202.974 km/h), May 27, 1989
- USAC Silver Crown Champ Car Series Qualifying: Jason Leffler, 20.298 sec. = 121.667 mph (195.804 km/h), May 20, 2000
- U.S. F2000 National Championship Qualifying: Aaron Justus, 20.930 sec. = 117.510 mph (189.114 km/h), September 23, 2000
- ARCA/CRA Super Series Qualifying: Evan Jackson, 21.284 sec. =116.031 mph (186.734 km/h), September 22, 2007
- NASCAR Busch Series Qualifying: David Green, 21.766 sec. = 113.462 mph (182.599 km/h), August 5, 1994
- NASCAR Truck Series Qualifying: Joe Ruttman, 22.081 sec. = 111.843 mph (179.994 km/h), August 3, 2000
- ARCA Racing Series Qualifying: Ty Gibbs, 21.820 sec. = 113.181 mph (182.147 km/h), October 5, 2019

=== Race lap records ===
As of August 2023, the fastest official race lap records at Indianapolis Raceway Park for different classes are listed as:

Category	Time	Driver	Vehicle	Date
Oval (1960–present): 0.686 mi (1.104 km)
USF Pro 2000	0:19.7522	Braden Eves	Tatuus IP-22	25 May 2024
U.S. F2000	0:21.016	Bryan Sellers	Van Diemen DP08	25 May 2002
ARCA Menards	0:22.298	Jesse Love	Toyota Camry	11 August 2023
NASCAR Truck	0:22.583	John Hunter Nemechek	Toyota Tundra	29 July 2022
Road Course (1968–present): 2.500 mi (4.023 km)
WSC	1:23.622	Eliseo Salazar	Ferrari 333 SP	10 July 1994
Formula Atlantic	1:24.529	Larry Connor	Ralt RT41	1 July 2000
Can-Am	1:25.880	Jerry Hansen	Lola T333	1 May 1980
C Sports Racer	1:27.130	Tony Coniewski	Swift Viking	4 July 2004
IMSA GTS	1:27.451	Irv Hoerr	Oldsmobile Cutlass Supreme	10 July 1994
Formula Continental	1:29.771	Jeff Shafer	Nemesis	1 July 1997
IMSA GTO	1:32.515	Joe Pezza	Ford Mustang	10 July 1994
D Sports Racing	1:32.651	Alvin Beasley Sr.	Beasley Decker	1 July 1992
Formula Ford	1:33.575	Mark Davison	Swift DB1	1 July 1999
IMSA GTU	1:34.479	Jim Pace	Nissan 240SX	10 July 1994
Group 4	1:40.200	Peter Gregg	Porsche Carrera RSR	14 October 1973
Formula Junior	1:42.400	Jim Hall	Lotus 18	29 July 1962
Sports car	1:50.500	Augie Pabst	Scarab Mk. II	25 June 1961

=== Drag strip records ===
Category	E.T.	Speed	Driver	Event	Ref
Top Fuel	3.640		Brittany Force	2022 Dodge Power Brokers NHRA U.S. Nationals	
Top Fuel		339.79 mph (546.84 km/h)	Brittany Force	2025 Cornwell Quality Tools NHRA U.S. Nationals	
Funny Car	3.799		Matt Hagan	2017 Chevrolet Performance U.S. Nationals	
Funny Car		338.77 mph (545.20 km/h)	Matt Hagan	2017 Chevrolet Performance U.S. Nationals	
Pro Stock	6.491		Greg Anderson	2025 Cornwell Quality Tools NHRA U.S. Nationals	
Pro Stock		211.26 mph (339.99 km/h)	Erica Enders	2025 Cornwell Quality Tools NHRA U.S. Nationals	
Pro Stock Motorcycle	6.739		Gaige Herrera	2025 Cornwell Quality Tools NHRA U.S. Nationals	
Pro Stock Motorcycle		201.16 mph (323.74 km/h)	Matt Smith	2022 Dodge Power Brokers NHRA U.S. Nationals	

== Track configurations ==
Drag Strip

Oval

Road Course

== Major events ==
Current

- May: USF Pro 2000 Championship Freedom 90, USF2000 Championship Freedom 75, USAC Silver Crown Series Dave Steele Carb Night Classic & Hoosier Hundred
- July: NASCAR Truck Series TSport 200, ARCA Menards Series Reese's 200
- Labor Day Weekend: NHRA NHRA U.S. Nationals
- October: USAC Silver Crown Series Championship Saturday

Former

- ASA National Tour (1997–2004)
- Fast Masters (1993)
- Hooters Pro Cup Series (2001–2002, 2004–2006)
- IMSA GT Championship
  - Hoosier Grand Prix (1973, 1994)
- NASCAR Busch North Series (1987–1990)
- NASCAR Nationwide Series
  - Kroger 200 (1982–2011)
- NASCAR Winston Modified Tour (1988–1989)
- NHRA E3 Nationals, Summernationals, and Indy Nationals (2020)
- Red Bull Global Rallycross Championship (2017)
- USAC Road Racing Championship
  - Hoosier Grand Prix (1961–1963, 1965–1970)
- USAC Stock Car
  - Yankee 300 (1963–1972)
- USAC P1 Insurance National Midget Championship
  - Night before the 500 (1969–1971, 1974–2014) – Midgets were swapped with Silver Crown cars beginning in 2015.
- Superstar Racing Experience (2021)
