= Meadowdale =

Meadowdale may refer to:

- Meadowdale High School (Washington), Lynnwood, Washington
- Meadowdale High School (Ohio), Dayton, Ohio
- Meadowdale International Raceway
- Carpentersville, Illinois, whose northern section is a formerly-independent subdivision called Meadowdale
