= 1959 USAC Road Racing Championship =

Seasons
- ← 1958 1960 →

The 1959 USAC Road Racing Championship season was the second season of the USAC Road Racing Championship. It began March 8, 1959, and ended October 18, 1959, after eleven races. The series was contested for sports cars at eight rounds, and Formula Libre at three rounds. Augie Pabst won the season championship.

== Calendar ==
Rnd	Race	Length	Circuit	Location	Date
1	Los Angeles Examiner International Grand Prix	150 mi (240 km)	Los Angeles County Fairgrounds	Pomona, California	March 8
2	Daytona 1000 Kilometres	6 Hours	Daytona International Raceway	Daytona Beach, Florida	April 5
3	Meadowdale 505	505 km (314 mi)	Meadowdale International Raceway	Carpentersville, Illinois	May 31
4	USAC Lime Rock	180 km (110 mi)	Lime Rock Park	Lakeville, Connecticut	June 6
5	Meadowdale Gala 444	444 km (276 mi)	Meadowdale International Raceway	Carpentersville, Illinois	July 5
6	Kiwanis Grand Prix	150 mi (240 km)	Riverside International Raceway	Riverside, California	July 19
7	USAC Formula Libre Race	150 mi (240 km)	Lime Rock Park	Lakeville, Connecticut	July 25
8	Meadowdale Formula Libre	165 mi (266 km)	Meadowdale International Raceway	Carpentersville, Illinois	September 6
9	Vaca Valley Sports Car Race	100 mi (160 km)	Vaca Valley Raceway	Vacaville, California	September 27
10	United States Grand Prix for Sports Cars	200 mi (320 km)	Riverside International Raceway	Riverside, California	October 11
11	International Formula Libre Grand Prix	230 km (140 mi)	Watkins Glen International	Watkins Glen, New York	October 18

== Season results ==
Rnd	Circuit	Winning team	Results
Rnd	Circuit	Winning driver(s)	Results
1	Pomona	#50 Zipper-Estes	Results
1	Pomona	(United Kingdom) Ken Miles	Results
2	Daytona	#86 Porsche	Results
2	Daytona	(Argentina) Roberto Mieres (Argentina) Anton von Döry	Results
3	Meadowdale	#31 Nickey Racing Team	Results
3	Meadowdale	(United States) Jim Jeffords	Results
4	Lime Rock	Elisha Walker	Results
4	Lime Rock	(United States) George Constantine	Results
5	Meadowdale	#10 Nickey Chevrolet	Results
5	Meadowdale	(United States) Jim Jeffords	Results
6	Riverside	#211 John von Neumann	Results
6	Riverside	(United States) Richie Ginther	Results
7	Lime Rock	Kurtis Kraft Midget/Offenhauser	Results
7	Lime Rock	(United States) Rodger Ward	Results
8	Meadowdale	#50 Meister Brauser	Results
8	Meadowdale	(United States) Augie Pabst	Results
9	Vaca Valley	#50 Meister Brauser	Results
9	Vaca Valley	(United States) Augie Pabst	Results
10	Riverside	#2 Eleanor von Neumann	Results
10	Riverside	(United States) Phil Hill	Results
11	Watkins Glen	#1 British Racing Partnership	Results
11	Watkins Glen	(United Kingdom) Stirling Moss	Results
