= 1962 USAC Road Racing Championship =

Seasons
- ← 1961 none →

The 1962 USAC Road Racing Championship season was the fifth and final season of the USAC Road Racing Championship. It began April 1, 1962, and ended October 21, 1962, after five races. The series was contested for Formula Libre at the first two rounds, and sports cars at the final three rounds. Roger Penske won the season championship.

== Calendar ==
Rnd	Race	Length	Circuit	Location	Date
1	Pipeline 200	200 mi (320 km)	Hilltop Raceway	Bossier City, Louisiana	April 1
2	Hoosier Grand Prix	200 mi (320 km)	Indianapolis Raceway Park	Clermont, Indiana	June 29
3	Pacific North West Grand Prix 200	200 mi (320 km)	Pacific Raceways	Kent, Washington	July 2
4	Los Angeles Times presents the Grand Prix for Sports Cars	200 mi (320 km)	Riverside International Raceway	Riverside, California	October 14
5	Pacific Grand Prix 200	200 mi (320 km)	Laguna Seca Raceway	Monterey, California	October 21

== Season results ==
Rnd	Circuit	Winning team	Results
Rnd	Circuit	Winning driver(s)	Results
1	Hilltop	#96 Frank Arciero	Results
1	Hilltop	(United States) Dan Gurney	Results
2	IRP	#66 Chaparral Cars	Results
2	IRP	(United States) Jim Hall	Results
3	Kent	#96 Frank Arciero	Results
3	Kent	(United States) Dan Gurney	Results
4	Riverside	#6 Updraught Enterprises, Inc.	Results
4	Riverside	(United States) Roger Penske	Results
5	Laguna Seca	#6 Updraught Enterprises, Inc.	Results
5	Laguna Seca	(United States) Roger Penske	Results
