= 1961 USAC Road Racing Championship =

Seasons
- ← 1960 1962 →

The 1961 USAC Road Racing Championship season was the fourth season of the USAC Road Racing Championship. It began June 25, 1961, and ended October 22, 1961, after four races. Ken Miles won the season championship.

== Calendar ==
Rnd	Race	Length	Circuit	Location	Date
1	Hoosier Grand Prix	200 mi (320 km)	Indianapolis Raceway Park	Clermont, Indiana	June 25
2	Continental Divide 200	200 mi (320 km)	Continental Divide Raceway	Castle Rock, Colorado	July 2
3	Grand Prix for Sports Cars	200 mi (320 km)	Riverside International Raceway	Riverside, California	October 15
4	San Francisco Examiner Pacific Grand Prix	200 mi (320 km)	Laguna Seca Raceway	Monterey, California	October 22

== Season results ==
Rnd	Circuit	Winning team	Results
Rnd	Circuit	Winning driver(s)	Results
1	IRP	#6 Harry Woodnorth	Results
1	IRP	(United States) Augie Pabst	Results
2	Castle Rock	#9 Crandall Industries	Results
2	Castle Rock	(United Kingdom) Ken Miles	Results
3	Riverside	#4 Brabham Racing Org., Ltd.	Results
3	Riverside	(Australia) Jack Brabham	Results
4	Laguna Seca	#7 UDT-Laystall Racing Team	Results
4	Laguna Seca	(United Kingdom) Stirling Moss	Results
