= 1960 USAC Road Racing Championship =

Seasons
- ← 1959 1961 →

The 1960 USAC Road Racing Championship season was the third season of the USAC Road Racing Championship. It began April 3, 1960, and ended October 23rd, 1960, after five races. Carroll Shelby won the season championship.

== Calendar ==
Rnd	Race	Length	Circuit	Location	Date
1	Los Angeles Examiner International Grand Prix	200 mi (320 km)	Riverside International Raceway	Riverside, California	April 3
2	Continental Divide 100	100 mi (160 km)	Continental Divide Raceway	Castle Rock, Colorado	June 26
3	Road America Grand Prix	200 mi (320 km)	Road America	Elkhart Lake, Wisconsin	July 31
4	Grand Prix for Sports Cars	200 mi (320 km)	Riverside International Raceway	Riverside, California	October 16
5	San Francisco Examiner presents the Pacific Grand Prix	200 mi (320 km)	Laguna Seca Raceway	Monterey, California	October 23

== Season results ==
Rnd	Circuit	Winning team	Results
Rnd	Circuit	Winning driver(s)	Results
1	Riverside	#98 Camoradi USA	Results
1	Riverside	(United States) Carroll Shelby	Results
2	Castle Rock	Meister Brauser	Results
2	Castle Rock	(United States) Carroll Shelby	Results
3	Road America	#55 Camoradi	Results
3	Road America	(United States) Jim Jeffords	Results
4	Riverside	#53 Maserati Representatives of California	Results
4	Riverside	(United States) Bill Krause	Results
5	Laguna Seca	#1 British Racing Partnership	Results
5	Laguna Seca	(United Kingdom) Stirling Moss	Results
