= 1994 IMSA GT Championship =

24th season of the racing series organized by IMSA

Seasons
- ← 1993 1995 →

The 1994 Exxon World Sports Car Championship and Supreme GT Series seasons were the 24th season of the IMSA GT Championship. It was the first year for the new World Sports Car (WSC) class of open-cockpit prototypes in the premiere category, replacing the previous closed-cockpit GTP class. Grand Tourer-style racing cars were also raced and ran in the GTS, GTO, and GTU classes. It began February 5, 1994, and ended October 1, 1994, after nine rounds.

== Schedule ==
Most races on the schedule had separate races for the WSC class and the GT classes, while longer events ran both classes at the same time. Races marked with All had all classes on track at the same time for the whole race.

Rnd	Race	Length	Class	Circuit	Date
1	Rolex 24 at Daytona	24 Hours	All	Daytona International Speedway	February 5 February 6
2	Contac 12 Hours of Sebring	12 Hours	All	Sebring International Raceway	March 19
3	Grand Prix of Atlanta	1 Hour	GT	Road Atlanta	April 17
3	Grand Prix of Atlanta	2 Hours	WSC	Road Atlanta	April 17
4	The New England Dodge Dealers Grand Prix	1 Hour	GT	Lime Rock Park	May 30
4	The New England Dodge Dealers Grand Prix	2 Hours	WSC	Lime Rock Park	May 30
5	The Glen Continental	3 Hours	All	Watkins Glen International	June 26
6	Indy Grand Prix	1 Hour	GT	Indianapolis Raceway Park	July 10
6	Indy Grand Prix	2 Hours	WSC	Indianapolis Raceway Park	July 10
7	Monterey Sports Car Grand Prix	1 Hour	GT	Laguna Seca Raceway	July 24
7	Monterey Sports Car Grand Prix	2 Hours	WSC	Laguna Seca Raceway	July 24
8	Grand Prix of Portland	1 Hour	GT	Portland International Raceway	August 7
8	Grand Prix of Portland	2 Hours	WSC	Portland International Raceway	August 7
9	Exxon World Sports Car Championships	1 Hour	GT	Phoenix International Raceway	October 1
9	Exxon World Sports Car Championships	2 Hours	WSC	Phoenix International Raceway	October 1

== Season results ==
Rnd	Circuit	WSC Winning Team	GTS Winning Team	GTO Winning Team	GTU Winning Team	Results
Rnd	Circuit	WSC Winning Drivers	GTS Winning Drivers	GTO Winning Drivers	GTU Winning Drivers	Results
1	Daytona	(United States) #2 Brix Racing	(United States) #76 Cunningham Racing	Did not participate^{†}	(Germany) #65 Heico Motorsports	Results
1	Daytona	(United States) Price Cobb (United States) Bob Schader (Canada) Jeremy Dale (Italy) Ruggero Melgrati	(United States) Scott Pruett (United States) Butch Leitzinger (United States) Paul Gentilozzi (New Zealand) Steve Millen		(Germany) Ulli Richeter (Germany) Karl-Heinz Wlazik (Germany) Dirk Ebeling (Germany) Gunter Döbler	Results
2	Sebring	(United States) #9 Auto Toy Store	(United States) #75 Cunningham Racing	Did not participate^{†}	(United States) #49 Mark Sandridge	Results
2	Sebring	(United Kingdom) James Weaver (United Kingdom) Derek Bell (United Kingdom) Andy Wallace	(United States) John Morton (United States) Johnny O'Connell (New Zealand) Steve Millen		(United States) Mark Sandridge (United States) Nick Ham (United States) Joe Verde	Results
3	Road Atlanta	(Italy) #50 Euromotorsport	(United States) #75 Cunningham Racing	(United States) #17 Garfield's Auto	(United States) #95 Leitzinger Racing	Results
3	Road Atlanta	(United States) Jay Cochran	(New Zealand) Steve Millen	(United States) Joe Pezza	(United States) Jim Pace	Results
4	Lime Rock	(Italy) #30 Momo	(United States) #6 Brix Racing	(United States) #17 Garfield's Auto	(United States) #19 Bill Auberlen	Results
4	Lime Rock	(Italy) Gianpiero Moretti (Chile) Eliseo Salazar	(United States) Irv Hoerr	(United States) Joe Pezza	(United States) Bill Auberlen	Results
5	Watkins Glen	(Italy) #30 Momo	(United States) #6 Brix Racing	(United States) #00 Brian DeVries	(Peru) #4 Dibos Racing	Results
5	Watkins Glen	(Italy) Gianpiero Moretti (Chile) Eliseo Salazar	(United States) Irv Hoerr	(United States) Brian DeVries	(Peru) Eduardo Dibos	Results
6	Indianapolis	(Italy) #30 Momo	(United States) #6 Brix Racing	(United States) #17 Garfield's Auto	(United States) #95 Leitzinger Racing	Results
6	Indianapolis	(Italy) Gianpiero Moretti (Chile) Eliseo Salazar	(United States) Irv Hoerr	(United States) Joe Pezza	(United States) Jim Pace	Results
7	Laguna Seca	(United States) #3 Scandia Motorsports	(United States) #76 Cunningham Racing	(United States) #17 Garfield's Auto	(United States) #95 Leitzinger Racing	Results
7	Laguna Seca	(United States) Andy Evans (Spain) Fermín Vélez	(United States) Johnny O'Connell	(United States) Joe Pezza	(United States) Jim Pace	Results
8	Portland	(United States) #2 Brix Racing	(United States) #75 Cunningham Racing	(United States) #21 Tommy Riggins	(United States) #9 Leitzinger Racing	Results
8	Portland	(Canada) Jeremy Dale	(New Zealand) Steve Millen	(United States) Tommy Riggins	(United States) Butch Hamlet	Results
9	Phoenix	(United States) #2 Brix Racing	(United States) #76 Cunningham Racing	(United States) #28 Paul Gentilozzi	(United States) #19 Bill Auberlen	Results
9	Phoenix	(Canada) Jeremy Dale	(United States) Johnny O'Connell	(United States) Paul Gentilozzi	(United States) Bill Auberlen	Results

† - The GTO class was combined with the GTS class for Daytona and Sebring.

== Championship standings ==
=== WSC ===
Place	Driver	Team	Total
1	(South Africa) Wayne Taylor	Downing / Atlanta	190
2	(Canada) Jeremy Dale	Brix Racing	187
3	(United States) Jim Downing	Downing / Atlanta	178
4	(United States) Andy Evans	Scandia Motorsport	169

=== GTS ===
Place	Driver	Team	Total
1	(New Zealand) Steve Millen	Cunningham Racing	137
2	(United States) Johnny O'Connell	Cunningham Racing	129
3	(United States) Irv Hoerr	Brix Racing	117
4	(United States) Darin Brassfield	Brix Racing	85

=== GTO ===
Place	Driver	Team	Total
1	(United States) Joe Pezza	Garfield's Auto	113
2	(United States) Brian De Vries	Brian De Vries	87
3	(United States) Charles Morgan	Charles Morgan	57
4	(United States) Tommy Riggins	Tommy Riggins	43

=== GTU ===
Place	Driver	Team	Total
1	(United States) Jim Pace	Leitzinger Racing	105
2	(Peru) Eduardo Dibos jr	Dibos Racing Team Peru	101
3	(United States) John O'Steen	Rohr Corporation	88
4	(United States) Bill Auberlen	Bill Auberlen	76
