= Augie Pabst =

American sports car driver (1933–2024)

- Born: November 25, 1933 Milwaukee, Wisconsin, U.S.
- Died: October 9, 2024 (aged 90) Oconomowoc, Wisconsin, U.S.
- Retired: 1966
- Relatives: August Uihlein (great-grandfather] Frederick Pabst (great-grandfather); Augie Pabst III (son)

SCCA National Sports Car Championship
- Years active: 1956–1966
- Best finish: 1st in 1960

Previous series
- 1959: USAC Road Racing Championship

Championship titles
- 1959 USAC Road Racing Championship; 1960 SCCA National Sports Car Championship
- Awards: inducted in the Motorsports Hall of Fame of America (2011) inducted in Sports Car Club of America Hall of Fame

NASCAR Cup Series career
- 1 race run over 1 year
- First race: 1963 Golden State 400 (Riverside)
- Last race: 1963 Golden State 400 (Riverside)

August Uihlein Pabst Jr. (November 25, 1933 – October 9, 2024) was an American sports car driver from Milwaukee, Wisconsin. In ten years of racing, he won two national championships — the 1959 USAC and 1960 SCCA road racing championships. Pabst made one NASCAR start at Riverside International Raceway. He was a former member of the board of directors for Road America.

== Background ==
Pabst was born on November 25, 1933. He was a paternal great-grandson of two Milwaukee beer magnates: Pabst Brewing Company founder Frederick Pabst, and Joseph Schlitz Brewing Company owner and Uihlein family patriarch August Uihlein. Pabst was one when his father died. He attended Country Day for grade school, prepped at Deerfield Academy, and attended University of Wisconsin–Madison. Pabst opened an import car dealership called Pabst Motors in Milwaukee. The car dealership began his involvement in motorsports.

== Racing career ==
Pabst began racing in May 1956 on the infield road course of the Milwaukee Mile. His first race car was a Triumph TR3 (he was a Triumph dealer); he switched to a AC Ace-Bristol for 1957. Pabst took class victories in both cars.

Pabst moved up to a Ferrari TR in 1958 and won his first national SCCA race at the Milwaukee Mile. He continued in the Ferrari until he received a call from Harry Heuer to drive a Scarab on his Meister Brauser Team, sponsored by Peter Hand Brewing Company. Pabst soon won races at Meadowdale International Raceway and Vaca Valley Raceway in his new ride. The wins propelled him to winning the 1959 USAC Road Racing Championship.

Pabst raced for the 1960 SCCA National Sports Car Championship. He took wins at Meadowdale, Road America, Watkins Glen International, Ascarate Park Raceway (El Paso, Texas), and the Daytona International Speedway en route to winning the B Modified national championship.

Pabst was pressured to stop racing for a competing brewery, after a newspaper embarrassed his sponsor by making a play on his last name. He began racing for Briggs Cunningham in 1961 and continued until 1962 in a Maserati T-63. He won the Road American 500 and took fourth overall at the 1961 24 Hours of Le Mans. At the 1962 3 Hours of Daytona, the engine blew causing the car to do an end-over-end roll and Pabst to be ejected from the car. This took Pabst out of racing for several months, as he suffered third degree friction burns all over his body and multiple broken bones.

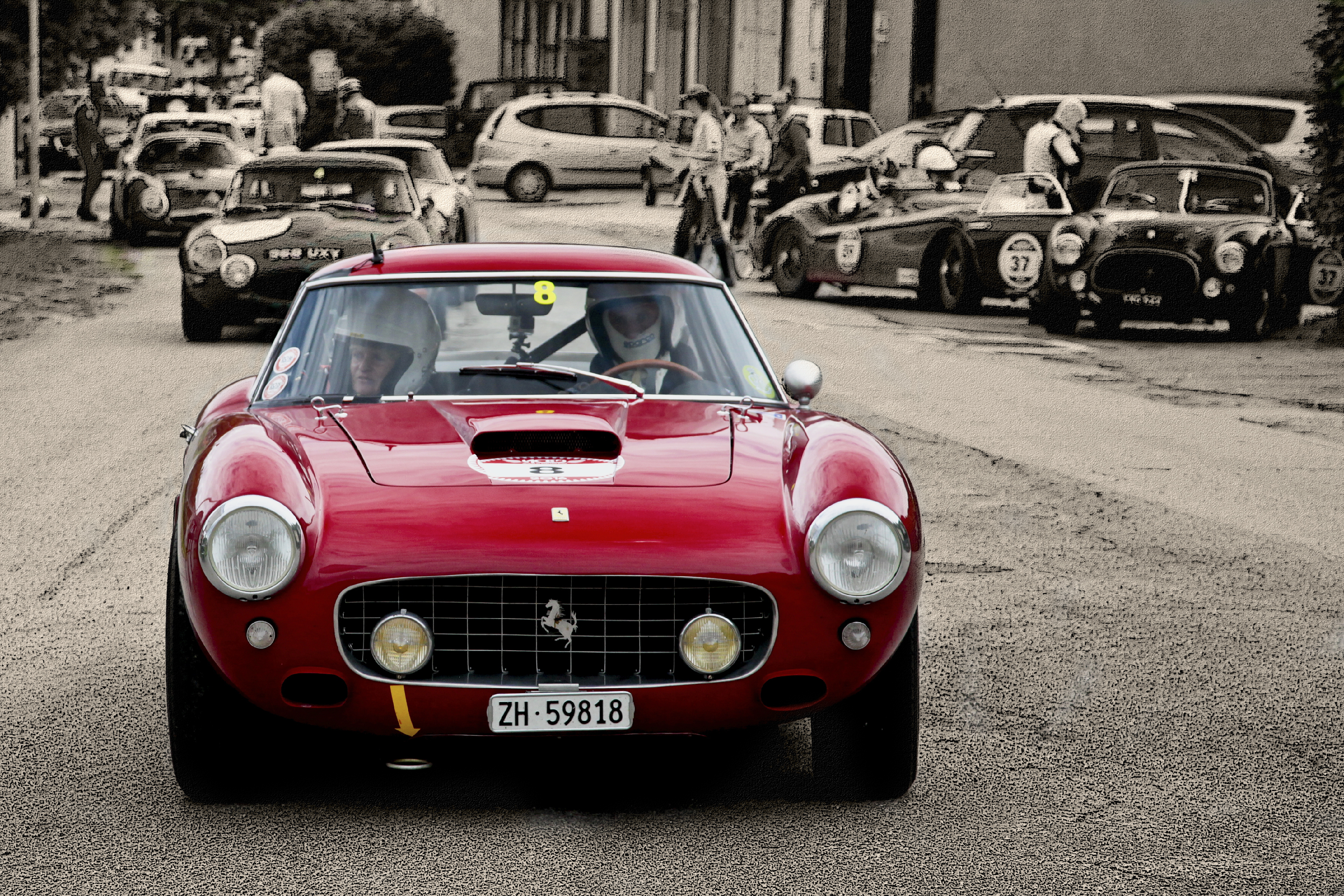
The Ferrari 250 GT Berlinetta SWB with which Ed Hugus and Augie Pabst finished fourth in the Sebring 12-hour race in 1960

Pabst returned in 1963 racing for the Mecom Racing Team. The team took a victory at the 12 Hours of Sebring in the GT class. He had another win at the Continental Divide Raceways race that year, along with another win at the Road America 500. In the Road America victory, he competed in the first half of the race in Mecom's Ferrari and relieved Bill Wuesthoff's victorious Elva Porsche in the second half. Pabst competed in one NASCAR Grand National (now Cup Series) race at Riverside International Raceway on November 3, 1963. He started 18th and finished 35th in the one-off event. In 1964, Pabst won another Road America 500 but had lots of mechanical failures throughout the rest of the season. Pabst decided to drive for himself in 1965 and ordered a McLaren. The vehicle arrived late and it burnt at Mosport after arriving. Pabst ended his racing career in 1966.

== Life after racing ==
Pabst became an executive for Pabst Brewing Company, on the condition that he sell his dealership and quit racing. After he retired in 1983, he did some vintage racing in his old Scarab that he had found and purchased. He was a member of the board of directors for Road America.

== Personal life and death ==
Pabst was married to his wife Joan. His son Augie Pabst III followed in his footsteps racing in sports cars and running Pabst Racing.

Pabst died in Oconomowoc, Wisconsin, on October 9, 2024, at the age of 90.

== Halls of Fame ==
Pabst was inducted in the Motorsports Hall of Fame of America in 2011. He was also inducted in the Sports Car Club of America.

== Racing record ==
=== 24 Hours of Le Mans results ===
Year	Team	Co-Drivers	Car	Class	Laps	Pos.	Class Pos.
1960	(United States) North American Racing Team	(United States) Ed Hugus	Ferrari 250 GT SWB	GT3.0	299	7th	4th
1961	(United States) Briggs Cunningham	(United States) Dick Thompson	Maserati Tipo 63	S3.0	311	4th	3rd
1963	(United States) Briggs Cunningham	(United States) Walt Hansgen	Jaguar E-Type Lightweight	GT +3.0	8	DNF	DNF
