= Meadowdale International Raceway =

Racetrack in Illinois, US

Coordinates: 42.1164°N 88.3037°W

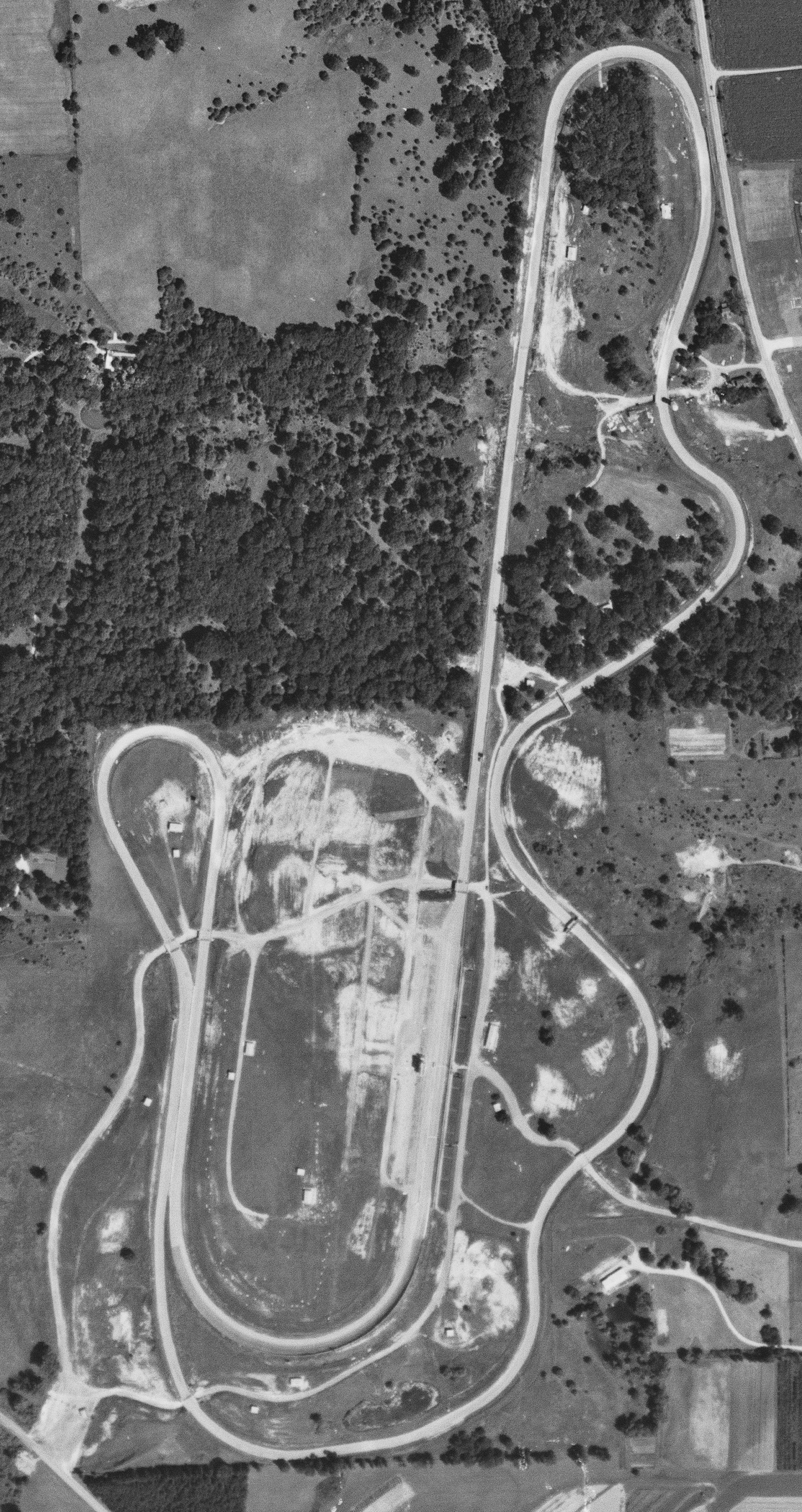
1962 aerial photo of Meadowdale Raceways

Meadowdale International Raceway was a race track located in Carpentersville, Illinois. It was used for motor racing from 1958 to 1968.

== The track's first life ==
Meadowdale Raceway was built in 1958 north of Carpentersville, Illinois, to attract development to the suburbs of Chicago. It is located at the intersection of Illinois Route 31 and Huntley Road.

At the time the track was built, Carpentersville was a very small industrial town on the Fox River that was just beginning to see the effects of the post-war housing boom in the United States. One developer, Besinger, who was erecting a housing subdivision along the river, decided to install a road race track across the highway from the subdivision as an attraction.

As originally opened, the track was 3.27 miles (5.26 km) long, with a steep 180 degree curve, known as the Monza Wall, leading onto the 3/4 mile front straight. The Chicago Region of the Sports Car Club of America (SCCA) conducted the track's inaugural event on September 13 and September 14, 1958, a regional race, drawing 150,000 spectators. However, SCCA indicates that the inaugural race was something less than a complete success:

Seeding of the grounds was unsatisfactory or had not been done, and dust enveloped everything and everyone. Earth embankments lined much of the course and several turns did not offer escape roads. The weekend was marred by a fatal accident during Race Three.

SCCA began a long series of negotiations with track management over improvements that were needed, but despite this, the 1959 and 1960 SCCA seasons contained no events at Meadowdale. Several major wrecks and the fatality that took place during the inaugural events gave it a reputation as a "killer", which it was never able to rid itself of.

The track was based on European road-racing courses. It was more challenging than what a lot of amateur drivers in America were accustomed to as it had no wide run-off areas that American amateurs expected. Additionally, the first few days of racing at the track were faced with high winds that created dust-clouds which obstructed the vision of drivers. In addition, these dust-clouds filthied spectators, making for upset crowds. Reports of massive traffic jams on nearby roads, and a long walk from the track's parking area only added to the difficulties faced by the newly opened race track. Management attempted to solve the track's problems, but lacked funding to make all the alterations that were needed.

Issues with the track were numerous. The paving on the Monza wall was rough, and the minute number of trackside run-off areas that the track had ended abruptly at the bridges (which were only as wide as the paving). This made for hard walls at severe angles with the track, a critical danger if any driver was to lose control when approaching them.

In addition to SCCA events, the track also hosted USAC auto racing, AMA motorcycle racing, and kart racing during its life.

The only events that proved marginally successful in making profit were rental events which were able to attract a modest attendance of spectators. The track never was able to garner enough cash to support the facility.

The track never committed to making a series of safety improvements requested by the various sanctioning bodies, and this, together with competition by nearby Road America, eventually led to the track's demise. The last major auto racing event, an SCCA Trans-Am Series race, held July 7 and July 8, 1968, as a last-ditch effort to save the track by making it a major professional racecourse. Nevertheless, the track closed soon afterwards in 1969.

== The track's second life ==
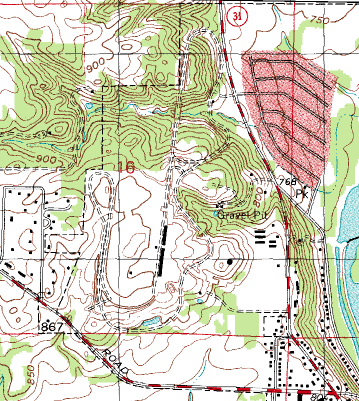
Excerpt from a USGS topological map showing the layout of Meadowdale

Various proposals were put forth over the years to bring racing back to Meadowdale. However, these ran into the same problems that had brought down the track in the first place: unsafe track conditions, and competition from Road America and Blackhawk Farms Raceway, and none were ever successful.

In 1994, a group of local park districts purchased the north 90 acres (360,000 m^{2}) of the track's land for use as part of a new forest preserve, and purchased the remainder of the site in 2002. Known as "Raceway Woods", the track site is now a forest and nature preserve and recreational area with purpose built mountain bike trails. The volunteers who maintain the site have recognized its importance as a race track, and have done much to keep the original track and related structures in place. The area still maintains its racing heritage in the form of an annual mountain bike race called the Raceway Rally.

Raceway Woods is maintained by the Dundee (IL) Township Park District and the Forest Preserve District of Kane County. To this day there are still engine blocks and various castings laying around the preserve which remind the hikers about the days of past race events.
