= USAC Road Racing Championship =

Sports car racing series in the United States

The USAC Road Racing Championship was a sports car racing series in the United States held from 1958 until 1962. The series was organized by the United States Auto Club as a fully professional alternative to the Sports Car Club of America's SCCA National Sports Car Championship.

== Champions ==
| Year | Driver | Car |
|---|---|---|
| 1958 | (United States) Dan Gurney | Ferrari 375 Plus; Ferrari 290 MM |
| 1959 | (United States) Augie Pabst | Ferrari 625 TR; Scarab Mk. II-Chevrolet |
| 1960 | (United States) Carroll Shelby | Maserati Tipo 61; Scarab Mk. II-Chevrolet |
| 1961 | (United Kingdom) Ken Miles | Porsche 718 RS 61 |
| 1962 | (United States) Roger Penske | Cooper T53-Climax |
