= Columbus Historical Society =

Historical society for Columbus, Ohio

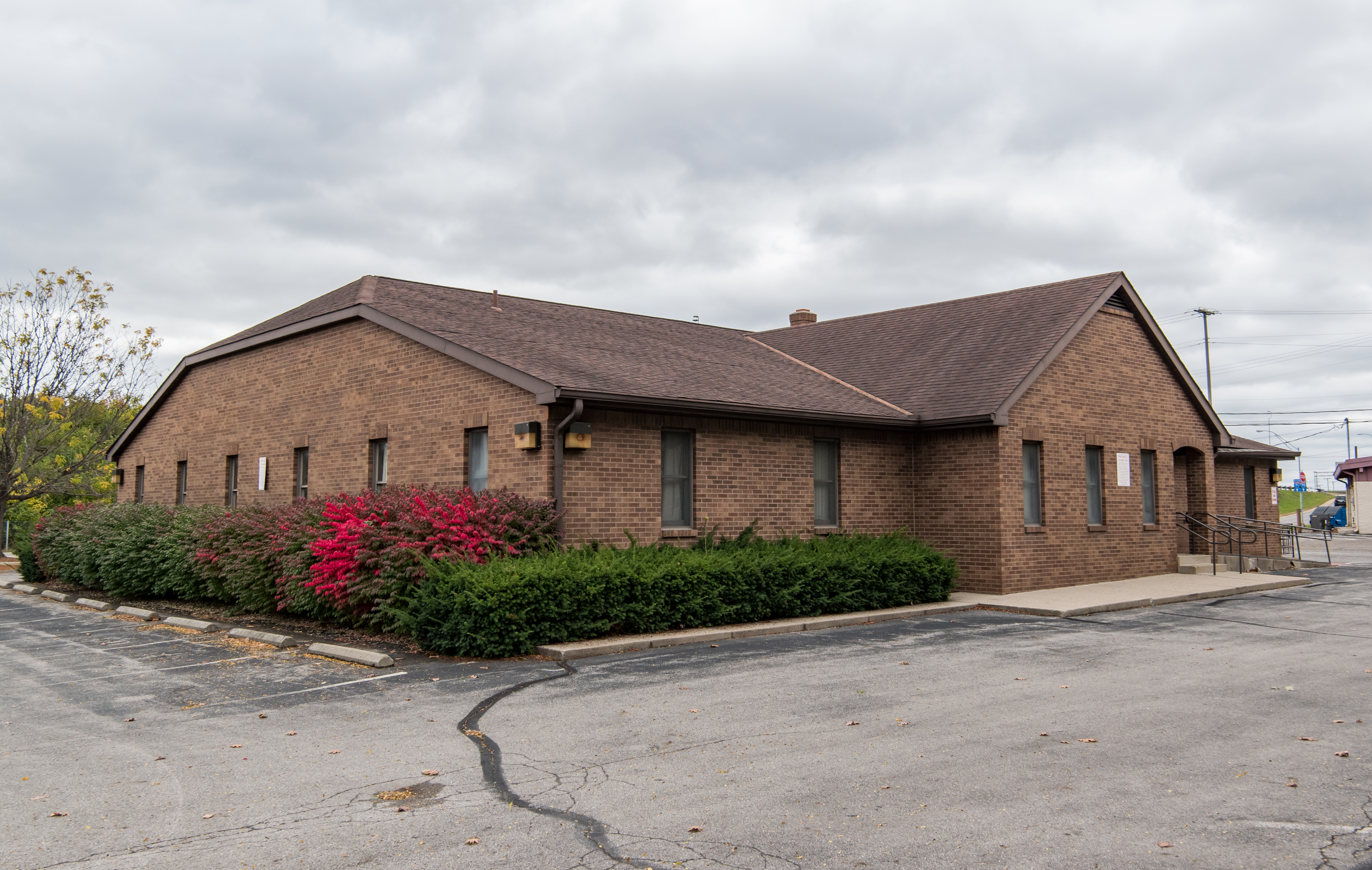
- Office and gallery
- Interactive map pinpointing the CHS
- Established: 1990
- Location: 717 West Town St., Columbus, Ohio
- Coordinates: 39.956041°N 83.019174°W
- Type: History Museum
- President: Jack Benjamin
- Public transit access: 3, 6, 9
- Parking: Surface lot
- Website: www.columbushistory.org

The Columbus Historical Society (CHS) is the historical society for Columbus, Ohio, chronicling the city's history. The society office and museum building is located in the Franklinton neighborhood. In 2020, the Columbus Historical Society aims to raise funds to purchase Engine House No. 6 for its first permanent home.

== Attributes ==
The historical society building has gallery spaces, and holds numerous local history and art exhibits each year. One of these, in 2016, displayed the history of Poindexter Village, the city's first public housing project.

Properties:

- Gen. William Henry Harrison Headquarters
- Sullivant Land Office

== History ==
The Columbus Historical Society was founded in 1990.

The historical society was once located on Jefferson Avenue in Downtown Columbus. It moved to a 2,400-square-foot space in the museum COSI in Franklinton in 2012. In 2017, it moved to its own building at 717 West Town St., also in Franklinton. The society considers the neighborhood an appropriate place, given that it was the first non-native settlement in Central Ohio, and is located around numerous historic and cultural sites. In December 2020, it was reported that the society had been working to open its first permanent headquarters in a nearby former fire station, Engine House No. 6. Originally planned to be occupied by CHS and Heritage Ohio, the historical society began an attempt to purchase the building on its own in July 2020.

The society is one of several working to restore the Old Port Columbus Terminal building, the original terminal and airport control tower for what is now known as John Glenn Columbus International Airport.

== See also ==
- Ohio History Connection
- Columbus Landmarks
- List of historical societies in Ohio
- List of museums in Columbus, Ohio
