= Driving Park =

Neighborhood in Columbus, Ohio, U.S.

- Neighborhood of Columbus, Ohio
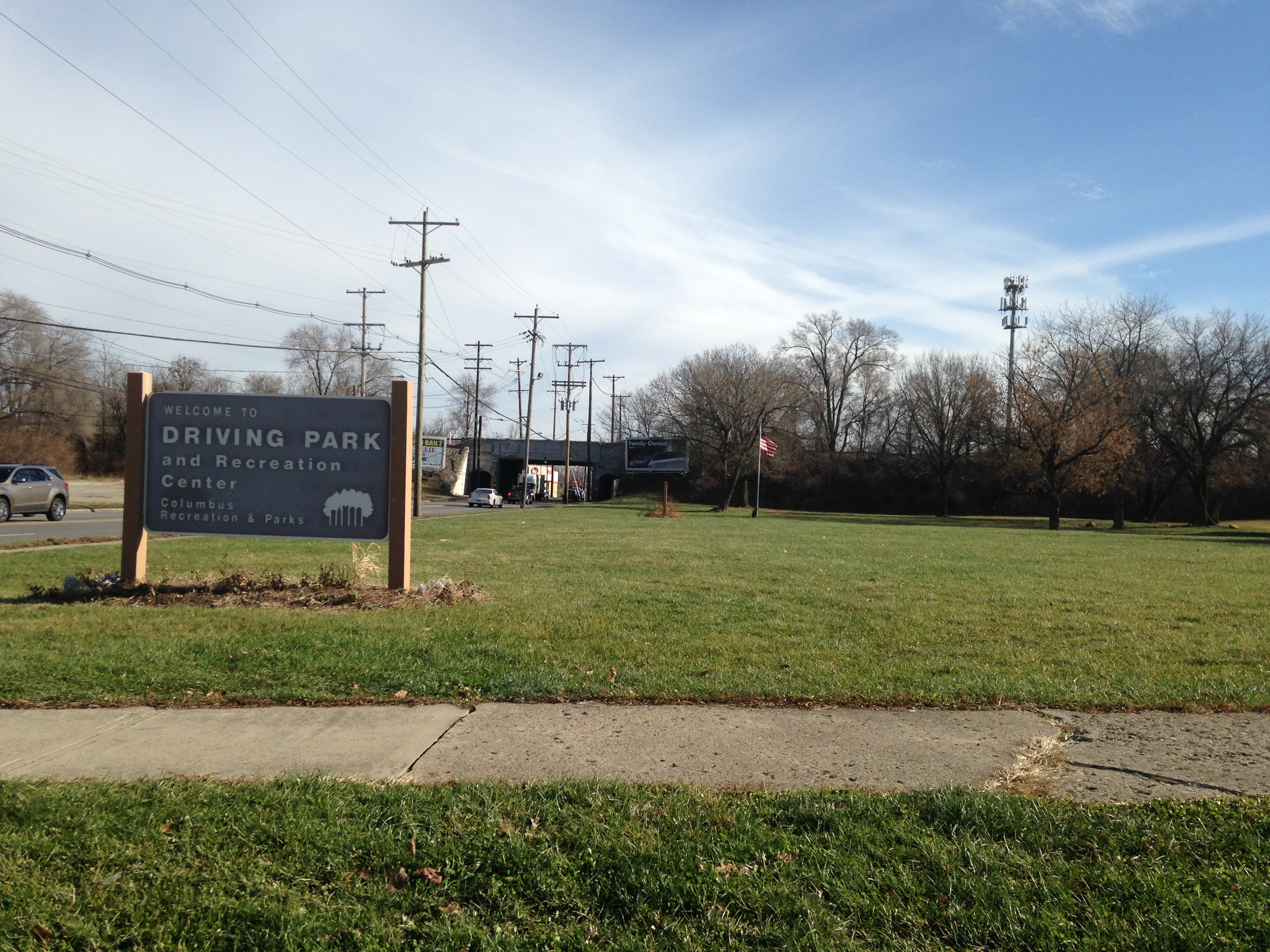
- Driving Park and Recreation Center
- Interactive map of Driving Park
- Coordinates: 39°57′N 82°57′W
- Country: United States
- State: Ohio
- County: Franklin
- City: Columbus

Driving Park is an urban residential area on the Near East Side of Columbus, Ohio, United States, just south of Interstate 70. Mainly a middle-class, predominantly African-American neighborhood, Driving Park and its surrounding neighborhoods consist of an area of 17,730 residents. Driving Park received its name from its historic past as a large racing complex, first for horses and later for automobiles.

== History ==
Driving Park received its name from its history as a large equine racing complex for horses and eventually automobiles during the 19th and early 20th centuries. The Columbus Ohio Driving Realty Company bought the land in 1892. Columbus residents traveled to Driving Park to enjoy the exciting horse races being held in the area. When automobiles came on the scene during the 1900s, the track was converted to allow auto racing. The largely flat, stretched oval design made it possible for drivers to set many records at the racetrack. One major event was the world’s first 24-hour endurance race in 1905. The track hosted 200-mile events during the 1912 and 1913 AAA Championship Car seasons, won by Spencer Wishart and Ralph Mulford, respectively. The community of Driving Park at one time was a small one, consisting of employees of the racetrack. Even though the racetrack was abandoned in the 1930s, the community continued to grow.

The construction of I-670 and I-70 resulted in demolition of much of Columbus’ predominantly African-American neighborhoods to the east; as a result African Americans moved further south. At one point the community was thriving with a theater and many diverse commercial outlets along E. Livingston Avenue and E. Whittier Street.

Historic neighborhoods exist on the south side of E. Livingston Avenue bordered by Frebis Avenue, where many middle-class families currently reside. On the corner of E. Livingston and Linwood Avenue stands a 19th-century mansion that was a stop on the Underground Railroad. The area has many beautiful small middle-class homes built during the 1940s. Larger, older houses called "foursquares" (slang for American Foursquare) built during the 1900s or 1930s remain as either single family or partitioned as doubles. Similar to other areas of Columbus, such as Victorian Village and the Short North, this area has many beautiful 19th-century homes that were owned by notable residents. In fact, the style of the homes vary, including echoes of German Village to the west part of the neighborhood, Olde Towne East to the north, and Bexley to the east. Driving Park was among the city’s first streetcar suburbs, developing with the extension of streetcar lines to what used to be outlying areas of Columbus. Residents currently living in the Driving Park area are requesting that the area be renamed the “Streetcar District” to spark interest and promote the history of the area.

== Geography ==
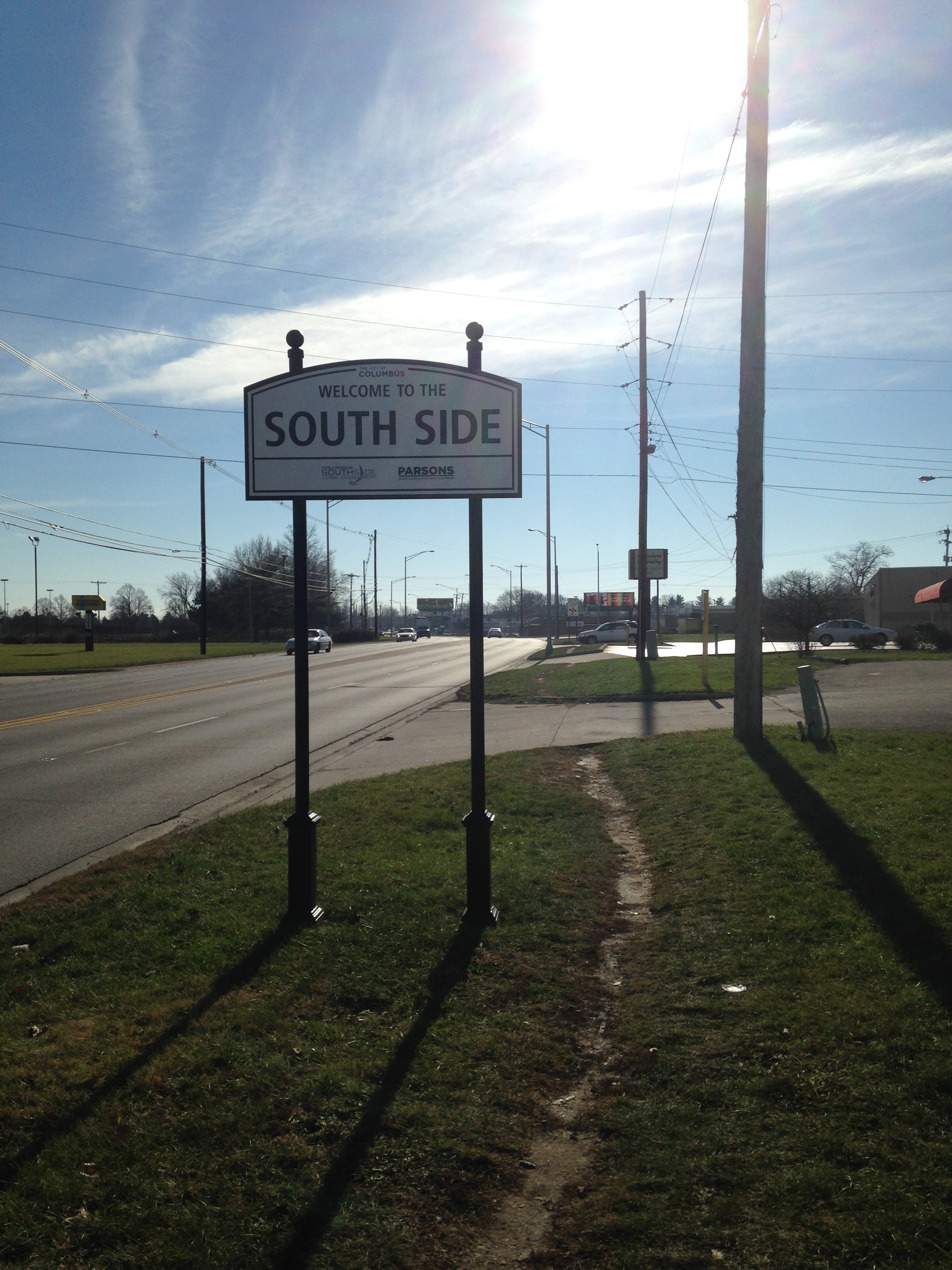
View along Alum Creek Drive, a border of the district of Driving Park

It neighbors many notable areas including Livingston Park, Old Oaks Historic District, Bryden Road Historic District, and the King-Lincoln Bronzeville District, all with the common thread of the notable Livingston Avenue Corridor which was part of one of Columbus' first streetcar suburbs. When the neighborhood is referenced, its boundaries generally consist of Mooberry Street on the north, Alum Creek Drive on the east, East Whittier Street on the south, and Kelton to the west. The Driving Park Area Commission recognizes the neighborhood's borders as I-70 on the north, N&W Railway on the east, East Whittier Street on the south, and Struder Avenue on the west. Further reference places the community directly in between Bexley and German Village.

== Transportation ==
The Central Ohio Transit Authority has local lines that run through the district including lines 1, 7, and 11. Line 1 makes a stop on Livingston and connects to Line 1 Cleveland at High and Broad Streets. From there the bus travels to Dublin, Ohio Health, Grandville Road, and Reynolds Park and Ride. Line 7 has a stop on Whittier that travels to downtown, the courthouse, and a US Post Office. Line 11 has a stop at the corner of Oak and Bryden that travels to downtown, Grant Medical Center, Columbus Metropolitan Library, DeVry Institute of Technology, Alum Crest High School, Eastland Mall, and Gender Road Town Center.

== Structures and landmarks ==
The Columbus Driving Park is a cultural landmark that defines the district. The Columbus, Ohio Driving Realty Company bought the land and located it in between Ellsworth and Seymour Avenue. It is famous for holding the first 24-hour automobile race on July 3, 1905. The race was held only ten years after the first automobile race and only two years after Ford Motors was created. There were three cars including drivers Charles and George Soules, Oscar Lear, Ballanger, and Feasal who drove 1,015 miles throughout the whole race. The Soules brothers won the race and their prize was a silver cup said to be worth $500 at the time. There were eleven other supporting races held at the track including the Columbus Motor Derby and the Novelty Race. In addition to the many races held at the track, there were many other events held in the neighborhood including the Franklin County Fair in both 1910 and 1917 and a landing strip for the test flight of the Model B airplane built by the Wright Brothers.

== Residential ==
In the early years of Driving Park, the jobs offered by the racetrack brought in its first residents. What started as more of an area for recreation turned into a more valuable residential area. When the racetrack was sold to the Driving Park Realty Company in 1926, the land was subdivided. Unique homes began to rise west of Fairwood Avenue, attracting middle-class shop owners and professionals.

As of January 2012, there were a total of 218 vacant homes in Driving Park according to the city's code-enforcement office.

Current residents are hopeful that the Nationwide Children's Hospital expansion and improvements along Livingston Avenue will attract hospital employees to the area.

== Recreation ==
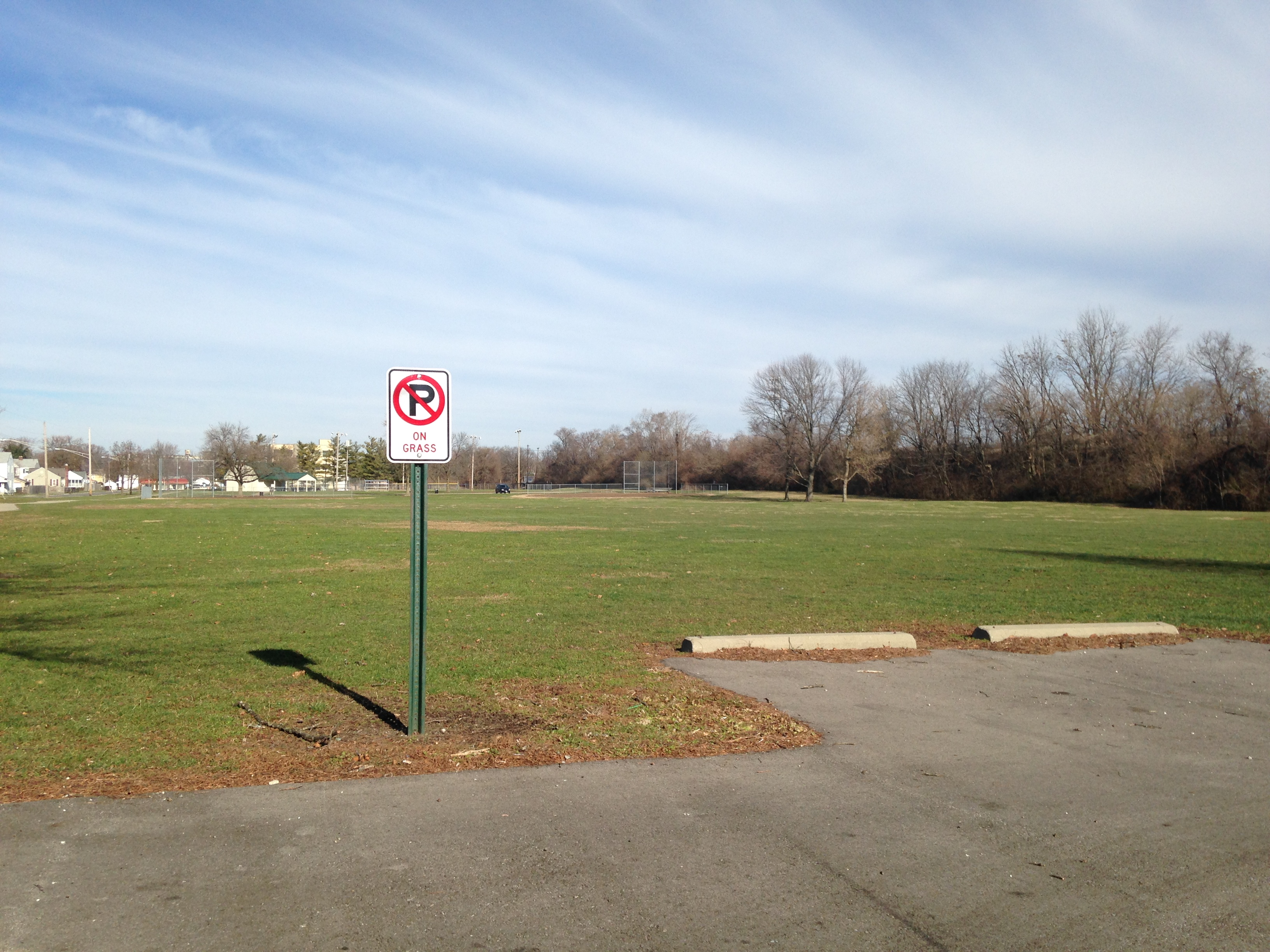
Driving Park and Recreation Center

The Driving Park and Recreation Center is located next to the railroad inside of the district and is one of the Columbus Recreations and Parks facilities. In order to gain access to the facilities, one must purchase a leisure card. There are many programs and classes geared towards children and young adults such as basketball, cooking, weight lifting, and line dancing.

== Education ==
The Fairwood Alternative Elementary School in the school district of Columbus City Schools is located near the north border of the district on the corner of Fairwood Avenue and Mooberry Street. Fairwood currently has 380 students enrolled in pre-K – grade 6.

== Gallery ==
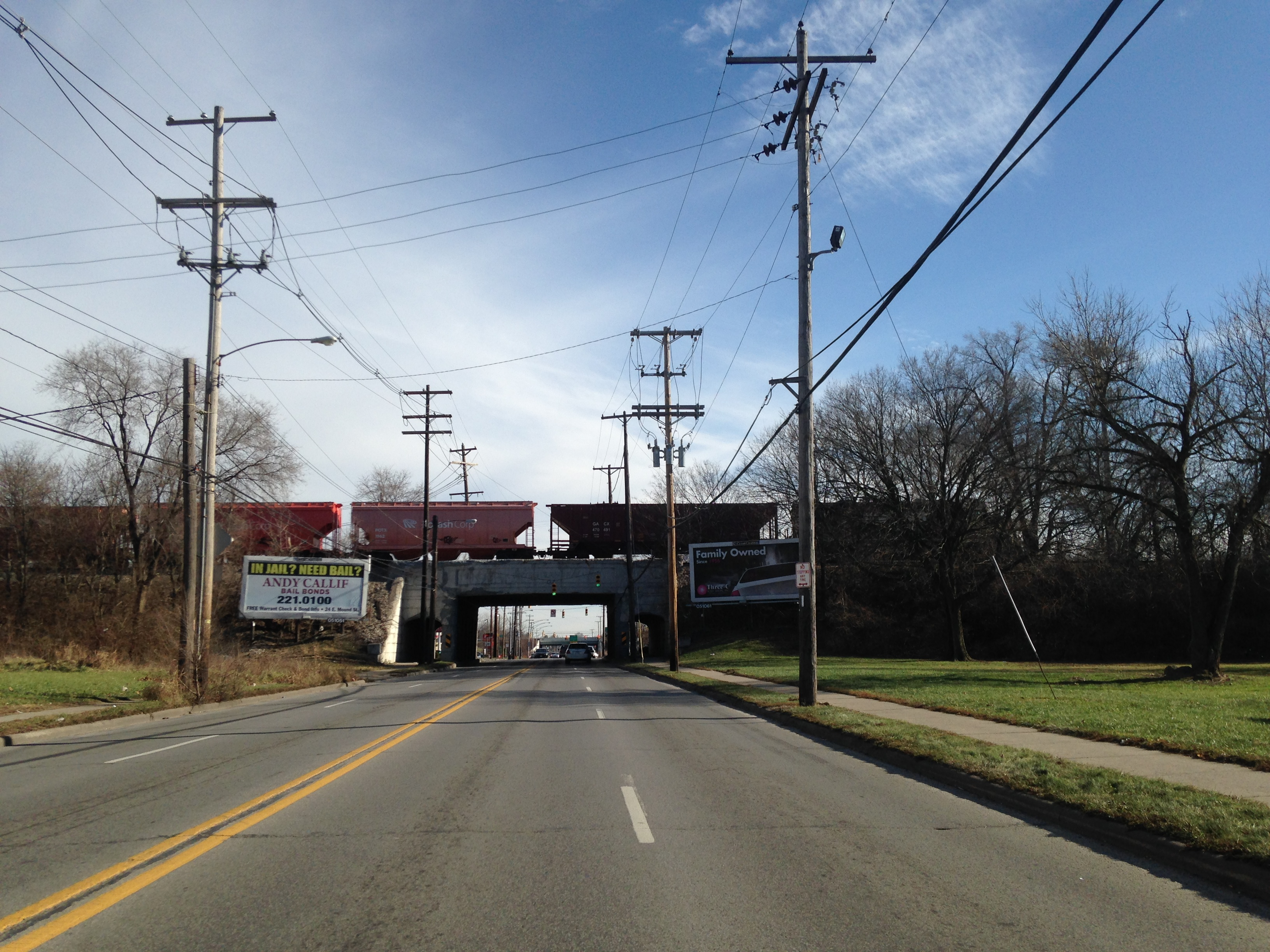
Railroad crossing over Livingston Avenue

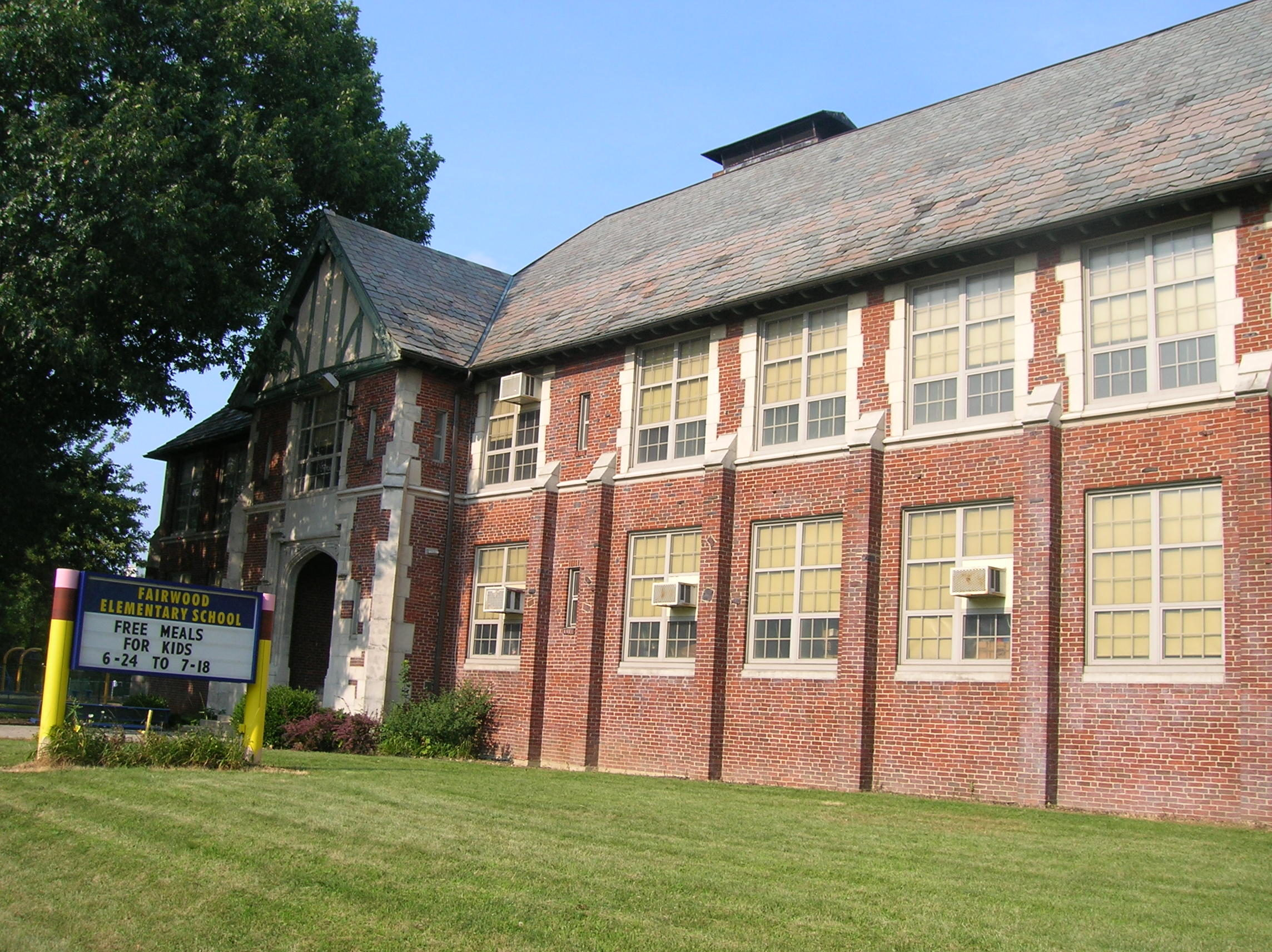
Fairwood Alternative Elementary School

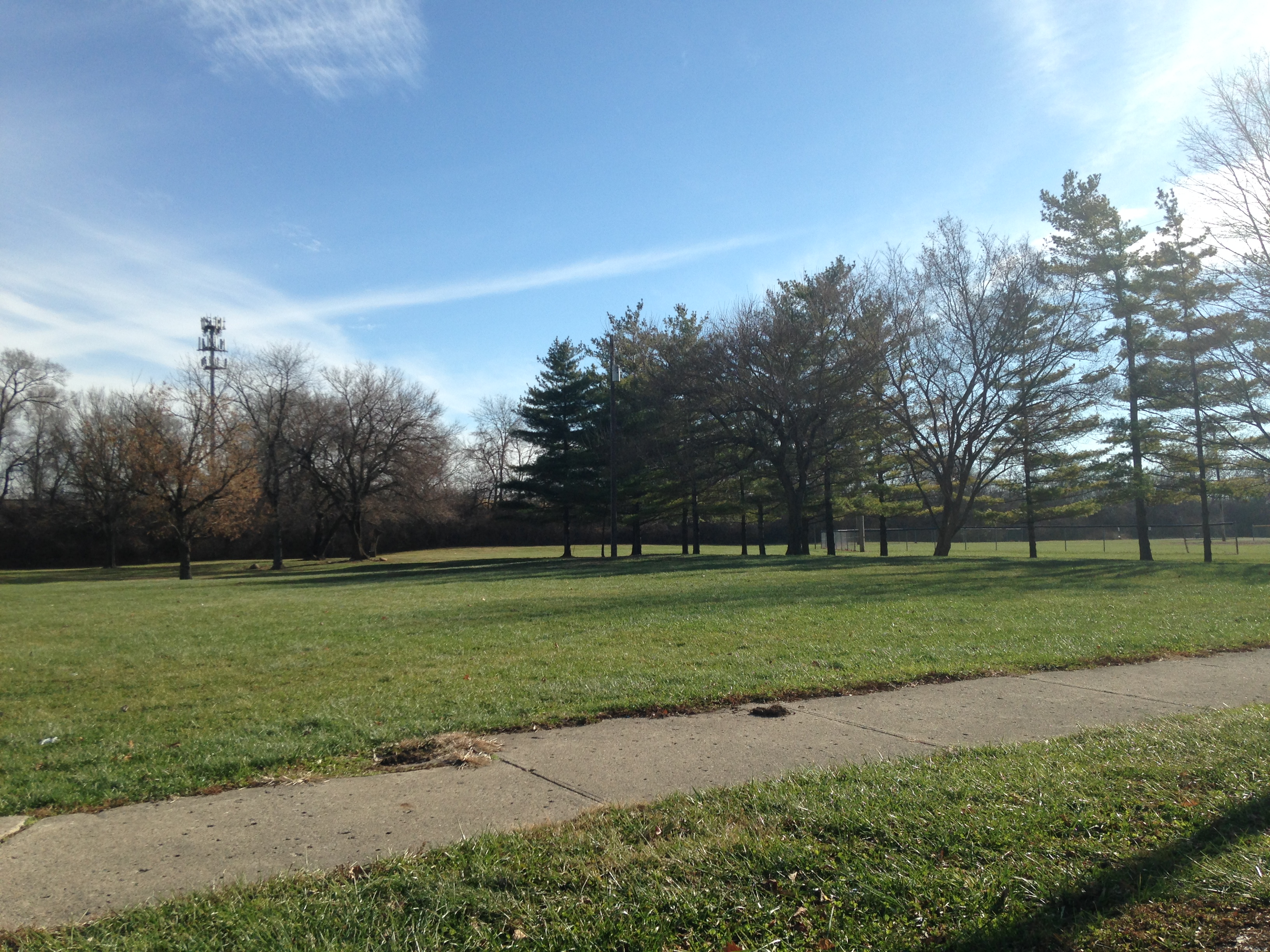
Driving Park and Recreation Center

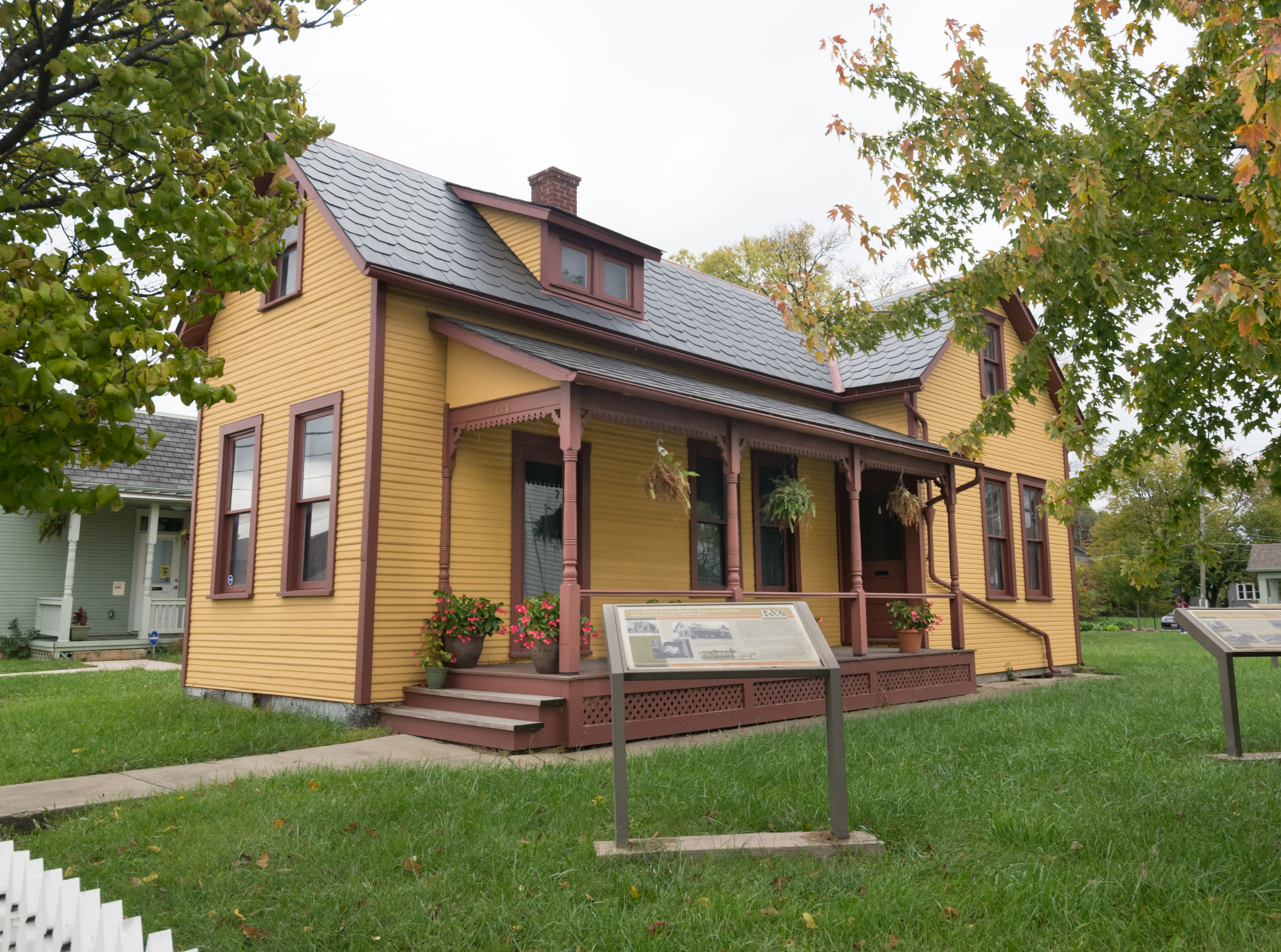
The Captain Edward V. Rickenbacker House

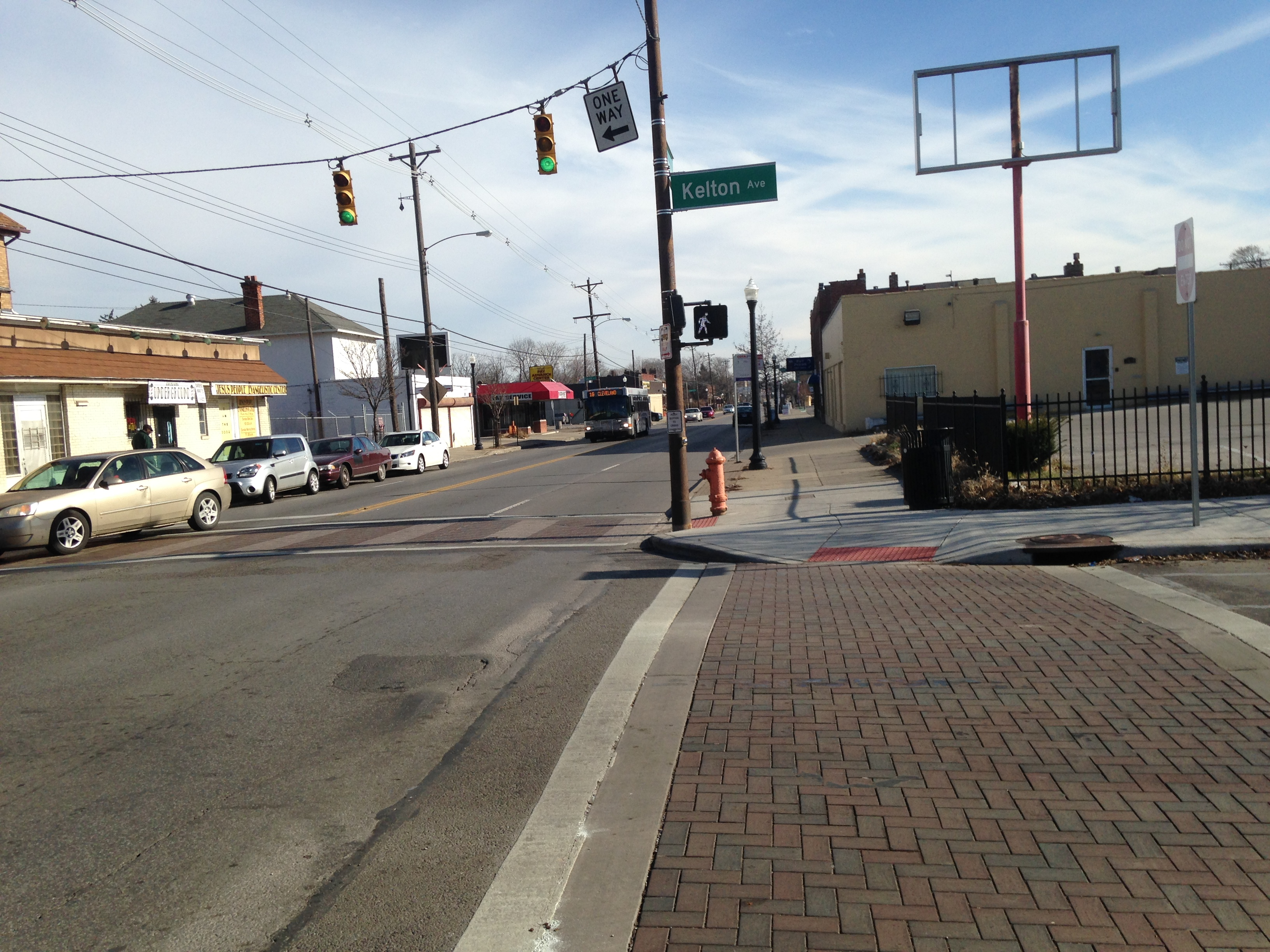
View looking down Livingston Avenue toward Alum Creek Drive across from the Driving Park Branch library

== Notable people ==
- Eddie Rickenbacker - World War I American fighter pilot ace

== See also ==
- Near East Side
