= List of museums in Columbus, Ohio =

This is a list of museums in Columbus, Ohio and non-profit and university art galleries.

The city's first museum was the Walcutt Museum, opened July 1851. At its opening, the museum had about six wax figures and a few paintings. It grew to have about 20 wax figures, several hundred animal specimens, and about 100 quality oil paintings.

== Museums in operation ==
| Name | Neighborhood | Type | Summary | Image |
|---|---|---|---|---|
| Beeler Gallery | Downtown | Contemporary art | Main gallery of the Columbus College of Art and Design | |
| Billy Ireland Cartoon Library & Museum | Ohio State University campus | Art | Collects cartoons, comic strips and graphic novels, including the collections of the National Cartoon Museum | |
| Central Ohio Fire Museum | Downtown | Firefighting | Located in the restored 1908 Engine House No. 16 | |
| Columbus Historical Society | Franklinton | History and art | Displays historical artifacts and local art Expected to move to Engine House No. 6 in the near future. | |
| Columbus Museum of Art | Downtown | Art | Displays European and American art and photography | |
| COSI | Franklinton | Science, children's | Displays about 300 interactive exhibits | |
| Hale Black Cultural Center | Ohio State University campus | African American culture and art | Features a large collection of Black art Indefinitely closed. | |
| Historic Costume & Textile Collection | Ohio State University campus | Textile | Exhibits permanent and changing exhibits in the Snowden Galleries | |
| Jack Nicklaus Museum | Ohio State University campus | Biographical | Museum about the life of golfer Jack Nicklaus | |
| Kelton House Museum and Garden | Downtown | Historic house | Showcases Victorian life and the history of the Underground Railroad | |
| Museum of Biological Diversity | Ohio State University campus | Natural history | Teaching collection, including insects, crustacea, fishes, molluscs, animal and plant specimens | |
| Museum of Classical Archaeology | Ohio State University campus | Archaeology | Includes prehistoric pottery from Cyprus, pottery from all periods, iron tools and weapons, examples of ancient writing, religious objects | |
| Museum of Catholic Art and History | Downtown | Religious | Displays Roman Catholic art and religious artifacts. Formerly known as the Jubilee Museum. | |
| National Veterans Memorial and Museum | Franklinton | Veterans, military history | Replaced the Franklin County Veterans Memorial | |
| Ohio Craft Museum | Fifth by Northwest | Crafts | Operated by Ohio Designer Craftsmen, showcases fine crafts | |
| Ohio History Center | Ohio State Fairgrounds | History | Exhibits the history of Ohio, operated by the Ohio History Connection | |
| Ohio Judicial Center Visitor Education Center | Downtown | Legal | Exhibits the history, role and responsibility of the Ohio court system | |
| Ohio Statehouse | Downtown | History | Includes the Ohio Statehouse Museum Education Center, with exhibits about the Statehouse, Columbus history, and the state government process | |
| Ohio Village | Ohio State Fairgrounds | Living history | Mid-19th century village, operated by the Ohio History Connection | |
| Orton Geological Museum | Ohio State University campus | Geology | Located in Orton Hall. Includes rocks, minerals and fossils from Ohio and around the world | |
| Pizzuti Collection | The Short North | Contemporary art | Temporary exhibitions of contemporary art from the collection of Ron and Ann Pizzuti | |
| Riffe Gallery | Downtown | Art | Showcases Ohio's artists and the collections of the state's museums and galleries, located in the Vern Riffe Center for Government and the Arts | |
| Thompson Library Gallery | Ohio State University campus | Literary | Exhibits the Ohio State University Libraries' special collections | |
| Thurber House | Downtown | Biographical, literary | Museum home of author James Thurber and literary center | |
| Wexner Center for the Arts | Ohio State University campus | Art | Contemporary performing and visual arts center | |

== Planned museums ==
| Name | Neighborhood | Type | Summary | Image |
|---|---|---|---|---|
| Eddie Rickenbacker and Driving Park museum | Driving Park | Biographical, historical | To be located in the Captain Edward V. Rickenbacker House | |
| Ohio Air & Space Hall of Fame and Museum | East Columbus | Aviation | Construction will begin in 2023 | |
| Poindexter Village Museum and Cultural Center | King-Lincoln Bronzeville | African American history and culture | | |

== Former museums ==
| Name | Neighborhood | Type | Summary | Image |
|---|---|---|---|---|
| Heritage Museum | Downtown | History | History of Kappa Kappa Gamma, located in the Victorian Snowden-Gray House, now an event space | |
| Santa Maria Ship & Museum | Downtown | Museum ship | Replica of Christopher Columbus's Santa María, taken apart, indefinitely pending refurbishment | |

== See also ==
- List of museums in Ohio for other museums in Franklin County and the rest of the state
- List of museums in Cincinnati
- List of museums in Cleveland
