= List of museums in Cincinnati =

This is a list of museums in Cincinnati and non-profit and university art galleries.

- See also List of museums in Ohio for other museums in Hamilton County, Ohio and the rest of the state.
- See also List of museums in Cleveland and List of museums in Columbus, Ohio.

== Museums ==
Name	Neighborhood	Type	Summary
American Classical Music Hall of Fame and Museum	Over-the-Rhine	Hall of fame - Music - Classical	
American Sign Museum	Camp Washington	Media	Formerly known as the National Sign of the Times Museum, art, design and manufacture of signs
Art Academy of Cincinnati	Over-the-Rhine	Art	Features three galleries
Betts House	West End	Historic house	Early 19th century brick house, operated by The Colonial Dames of America
Cincinnati Art Museum	Mount Adams	Art	
Cincinnati History Museum	West End	Local history	Part of Cincinnati Museum Center at Union Terminal, city's history
Cincinnati Museum Center at Union Terminal	West End	Multiple	Complex includes Cincinnati History Museum, Museum of Natural History & Science, Duke Energy Children's Museum, Cincinnati History Library and Archives and the Robert D. Lindner Family Omnimax Theater
Cincinnati Reds Hall of Fame and Museum	Central Business District	Hall of fame - Sports	
Cincinnati Triple Steam Museum	California, OH Greater Cincinnati Water Works	Steam Engines	Displays four of the world's largest crank and flywheel water pumping steam engines used between 1906 and 1963.
Cincinnati Type & Print Museum	Lower Price Hill	History	Letterpress Museum, Artist Studio, Job Training Program
Contemporary Arts Center	Central Business District	Art	
Duke Energy Children's Museum	West End	Children's	Part of Cincinnati Museum Center at Union Terminal, formerly the Cinergy Children's Museum
Fire Museum of Greater Cincinnati	Downtown	Firefighting	Located in a former firehouse
German Heritage Museum	Monfort Heights	Ethnic - German American	Contributions of the German immigrants and their descendants in the Ohio River Valley and America
Greater Cincinnati Police Museum	Over-the-Rhine	Law enforcement	
Harriet Beecher Stowe House	Walnut Hills	Biographical	House where author Harriet Beecher Stowe and family lived
Heritage Village Museum	Sharonville	Living History Museum	19th-century village of thirteen buildings including homes, a church, a train station, a general store, a print shop, a Doctor's office, and a schoolhouse.
Laurel Court	College Hill	Historic house	Early 20th-century Gilded Age mansion
Lloyd Library and Museum	Downtown	Art	Library of medical botany, pharmacy, eclectic medicine, and horticulture with art exhibits from its collections
Museum of Natural History & Science	West End	Natural history	Part of the Cincinnati Museum Center at Union Terminal, exhibits include dinosaurs, Egyptian mummies, geology, Neil Armstrong and Apollo 11
Nancy & David Wolf Holocaust & Humanity Center	West End	History	Located at Union Terminal, the Holocaust & Humanity Center exists to educate about the Holocaust, remember its victims and act on its lessons.
National Underground Railroad Freedom Center	Downtown	History	Stories of freedom's heroes, from the era of the Underground Railroad to contemporary times
National Voice of America Museum of Broadcasting	West Chester	American History	The original broadcast station of the Voice of America. Includes the Gray History of Wireless Collection and the Media Heritage Collection (original Cincinnati Radio and TV).
Price Hill Historical Society Museum	Price Hill	Local history	
Skirball Museum in Cincinnati	Camp Washington	Religious	Part of the Hebrew Union College-Jewish Institute of Religion, cultural, historical, and religious heritage of the Jewish people
Taft Museum of Art	Downtown	Art	Historic house with fine and decorative art
Verdin Bell and Clock Museum	Over-the-Rhine	Commodity	Antique clocks, bells and bell-ringing equipment
University of Cincinnati Art Galleries		Art	Dorothy W. & C. Lawson Reed Jr. Gallery in the DAAP Aronoff complex; Philip M. Meyers Jr. Memorial Gallery in the Steger Student Life Center; Sycamore Gallery is used on special occasions when an exhibition opportunity is presented on short notice
William Howard Taft National Historic Site	Mount Auburn	Biographical	Home of President William Howard Taft

== Defunct museums ==
- Hauck House Museum, Cincinnati, no longer open as a museum

== See also ==
- List of museums in the United States
