= Sullivant Land Office =

Historic land office building in Franklinton, Columbus, Ohio

- U.S. National Register of Historic Places
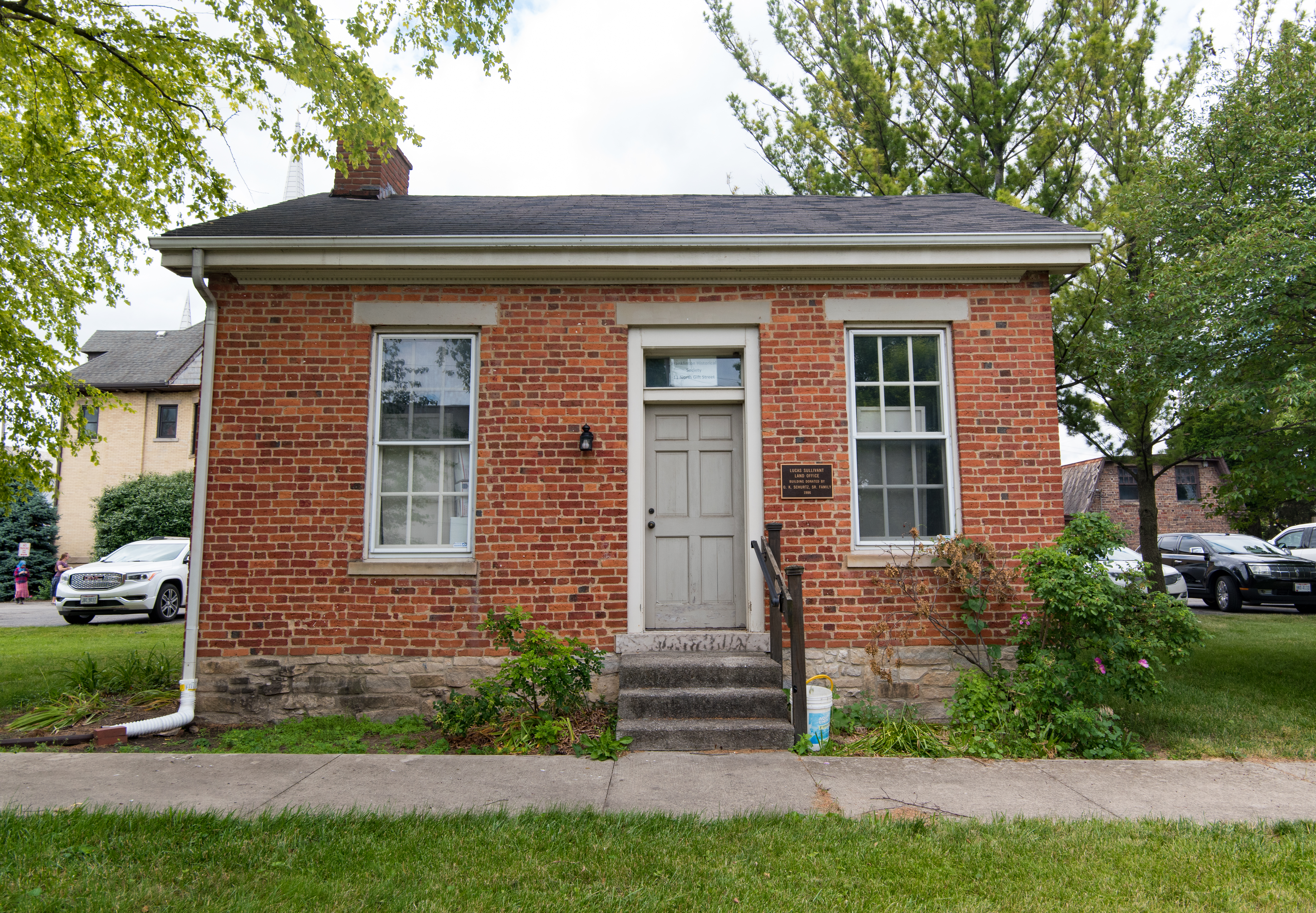
- The Sullivant Land Office at 13 North Gift Street, Franklinton, Columbus, Ohio

- Location within Ohio
- Location: 13 North Gift Street, Franklinton, Columbus, Ohio
- Built: c. 1822
- Architectural style: Federal style
- NRHP reference No.: 73001439
- Added to NRHP: March 20, 1973

The Sullivant Land Office is a historic brick building at 13 North Gift Street in Franklinton, a neighborhood of Columbus, constructed around 1822 by Lucas Sullivant, the founder of Franklinton. It is the only surviving structure in the Franklinton area directly associated with Sullivant. The building was listed on the National Register of Historic Places on March 20, 1973, and on the Columbus Register of Historic Properties in 1985. It is currently owned and operated by the Columbus Historical Society, which uses it for educational programming and public tours.

== History ==
=== Lucas Sullivant and the land office ===
Lucas Sullivant (September 22, 1765 – August 8, 1823) founded Franklinton in 1797 on the west bank of the Scioto River, making it the first permanent American settlement in what would become Franklin County. For more than two decades, Sullivant managed the sale, surveying, and transfer of large quantities of land in and around Franklinton from his home and from other properties on the settlement. Near the end of his life, around 1822, he constructed a dedicated land office at 714 West Gay Street to manage this business more formally.

At the time the building was constructed, Franklinton was the county seat of Franklin County, a status it held from 1803 until 1824, when the seat was transferred to the newly established city of Columbus across the Scioto River. Sullivant had played a central role in the establishment of Columbus, providing financial backing for the proposal to locate the state capital on the high east bank of the river in 1812. During those years, the land office served as the administrative center for Sullivant's extensive landholdings, which at the time of his death in 1823 amounted to nearly 40,000 acres.

=== An office busy with history ===
The land office was in operation during one of the most consequential periods in the history of central Ohio. In 1812, with news of General Hull's surrender at Detroit, Franklinton became an armed mobilization point for the War of 1812, with up to three thousand troops encamped in and around the settlement. As Sullivant continued to manage land transactions from his Gay Street office in the years immediately following the war, the town he had founded was being rapidly eclipsed by Columbus across the river.

One recorded episode from those final years illustrates how central the land office was to the daily life of the settlement. When Sullivant's brother-in-law and business associate Lyne Starling arrived in Franklinton around 1805 or 1806, he came specifically to assist Sullivant with his duties as county clerk and county recorder — responsibilities that overlapped directly with the land office's function of recording deeds and maintaining the chain of title for the Virginia Military District lands. The two men worked together from offices in Franklinton at the intersection of law, land administration, and civic development that defined the early county government.

A second episode concerns the land that would become Columbus itself. When the Ohio legislature accepted the proposal to locate the state capital on the east bank of the Scioto on February 14, 1812, the transactions that transferred parcels from Lyne Starling, John Kerr, James Johnston, and Alexander McLaughlin to the state were among the class of deeds that Sullivant's land management apparatus was designed to process and record. The land office thus occupied a direct administrative position in the founding of Columbus, even though it stood on the Franklinton side of the river.

Sullivant died on August 8, 1823, at the age of 57, just over a year after the land office was completed. His sons continued to manage the family's property from Franklinton for several more years.

=== Decades of disuse and threat of demolition ===
Following the death of Lucas Sullivant, the land office at 714 West Gay Street passed through various uses as Franklinton's role declined relative to Columbus. The building deteriorated significantly over the following century and a half. By the early 1980s, its original location was endangered by a combination of vandalism, structural deterioration, and municipal plans to redevelop the surrounding area as a park.

The Columbus Recreation and Parks Department undertook the relocation of the building in 1983, moving it from 714 West Gay Street to its current location at 13 North Gift Street, behind the William Henry Harrison Headquarters building at 570 West Broad Street. The move placed the land office alongside the other surviving structure of early Franklinton, and the Harrison House and Sullivant Land Office were formally dedicated together at the new location.

Gift Street itself carries historical significance in relation to Sullivant. He named it for his practice of offering free lots to settlers willing to build on the street, an inducement designed to attract residents to the new settlement in its earliest years.

== Architecture ==
The Sullivant Land Office is a small single-story brick building constructed in the Federal style, consistent with the vernacular commercial and civic architecture of early nineteenth-century central Ohio. The building's modest scale reflects its original function as a working office rather than a residence or public monument. Its brick construction set it apart from the more common log and timber-frame buildings that characterized much of early Franklinton.

The original structure was a single room. The building was expanded at some point in its history, though the original core of the structure survives. Following the 1983 relocation, the building was restored to reflect the appearance and function of an early-1800s land office.

== Historic designations ==
The Sullivant Land Office was listed on the National Register of Historic Places on March 20, 1973, under reference number 73001439. The listing was made under Criterion B of the National Register, which recognizes properties associated with the lives of persons significant in American history. In this case, the significance derives from the building's direct association with Lucas Sullivant, the founder of Franklinton and one of the original proprietors of Columbus. The National Register of Historic Places is maintained by the National Park Service and is authorized by the National Historic Preservation Act of 1966. Listing on the National Register recognizes a property's significance in American history, architecture, archaeology, engineering, or culture. It does not impose restrictions on the use of private property but makes federal historic preservation tax incentives available and requires federal agencies to consider the effects of their undertakings on listed properties.

In 1985, the Sullivant Land Office was listed on the Columbus Register of Historic Properties, alongside the adjacent Gen. William Henry Harrison Headquarters. The Columbus Register is a local historic designation program maintained by the City of Columbus Historic Resources Commission and Historic Preservation Office, established by city ordinance in 1980. Properties listed on the Columbus Register are subject to review by the Historic Resources Commission before exterior alterations may proceed; owners must obtain a Certificate of Appropriateness from the Columbus Historic Preservation Office for any exterior work. Local designation complements the federal protection afforded by National Register listing and provides an additional layer of oversight tied specifically to the City of Columbus's preservation ordinance.

== Current stewardship and visiting ==
In 2021, the City of Columbus transferred ownership of both the Harrison House and the Sullivant Land Office site to the Columbus Historical Society. The Columbus Historical Society is a nonprofit organization based at 717 West Town Street in Columbus, dedicated to preserving and interpreting the history of Columbus and Franklin County. Its 1797 Collaborative Committee was established specifically to ensure that programming at the Harrison House and Sullivant Land Office maintains a focus on Franklinton's history and its place in the founding of central Ohio.

The Sullivant Land Office has been restored to reflect the appearance and function of an early-1800s land office and is used for educational programming, including school group visits, public lectures, and community events. Many programs offered at the site are free of charge. Group tours of the building can be arranged by appointment through the Columbus Historical Society. Parking is available behind the Harrison House or along the street.

The Harrison House at 570 West Broad Street, which stands on the same site, is used for small events, exhibits, and meetings. The first floor of the Harrison House is accessible by ramp at the back entrance, and the first floor includes an accessible restroom. The second floor is not currently open to the public. Both buildings are located in the East Franklinton neighborhood, within walking distance of the Camp Chase Confederate Cemetery and the site of the former Lucas Sullivant House on West Broad Street.

== See also ==
- Lucas Sullivant
- Franklinton, Columbus, Ohio
- Gen. William Henry Harrison Headquarters
- National Register of Historic Places listings in Columbus, Ohio

== Sources ==
- "Harrison House and Sullivant Land Office". Columbus Historical Society.
- "Lucas Sullivant". Franklinton Historical Society.
- "Lucas Sullivant Office / Harrison House". Columbus Makes Art.
- "Franklinton Historic Buildings". All Columbus Data.
- "Franklinton Historical Marker". Historical Marker Database.
- "Harrison House and Sullivant Land Office". Columbus Recreation and Parks Department.
- "Historic Resources Commission". City of Columbus.
- "The Columbus Register of Historic Properties". City of Columbus Planning Division.
- "Surveyor's Journal Entry Four". Franklin County Engineer's Office.
- "Sullivant Land Office". Ohio Exploration Society.
- "National Register of Historic Places Program". National Park Service.
- "Sullivant Land Office – Wikidata". Wikidata.
- "Franklinton – Lucas Sullivant Land Office". Teaching Columbus Historic Places.
- "Lucas Sullivant: His Personality and Adventures". Ohio History Journal. 37: 177–189. 1928.
- "The Ohio-Columbus Centennial". Ohio History Journal. 37: 161–176. 1928.
