= Engine House No. 6 (Columbus, Ohio) =

Former fire station in Columbus, Ohio

- U.S. National Register of Historic Places
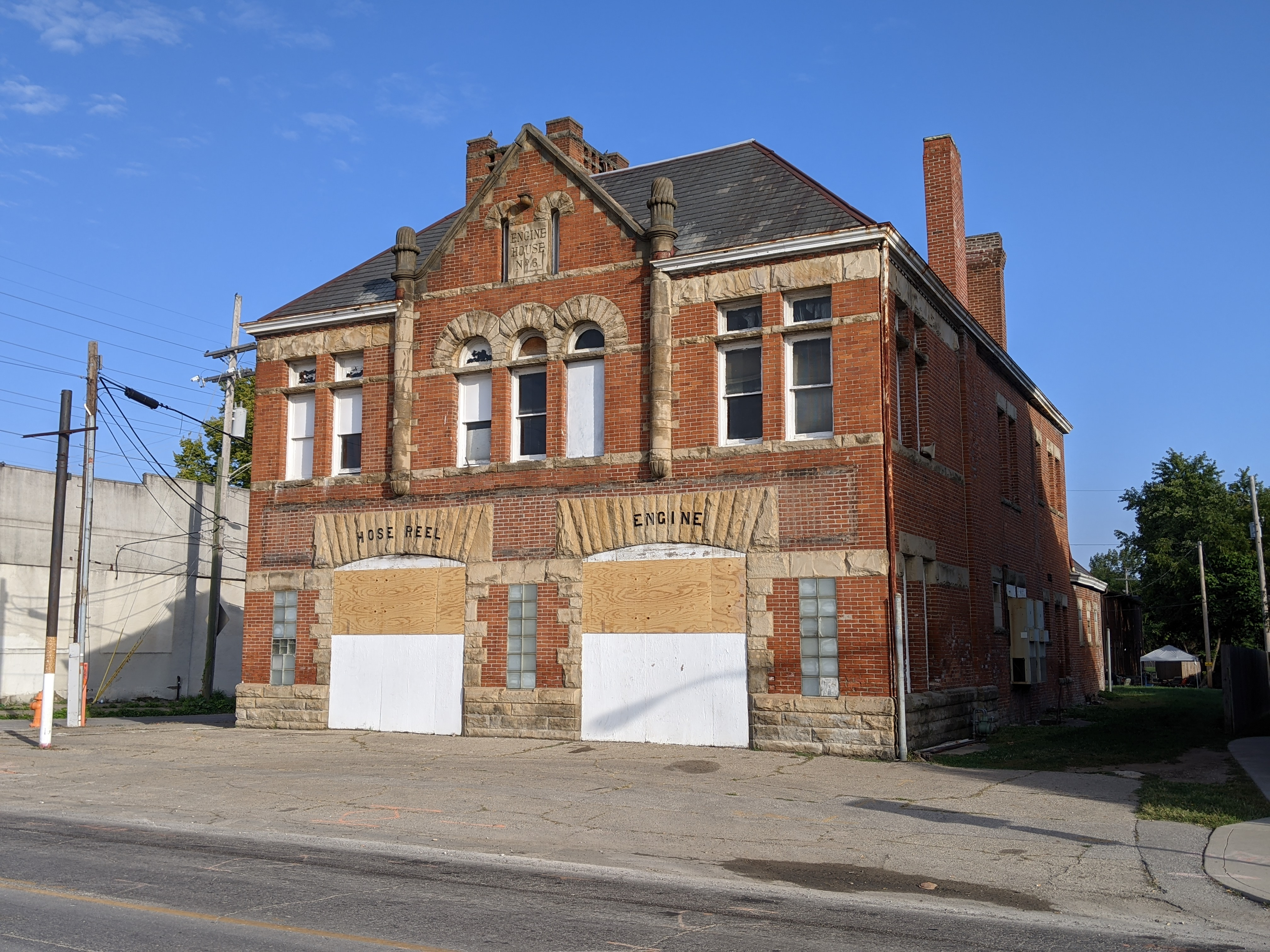
- Interactive map highlighting the building's location
- Location: 540 W. Broad St., Columbus, Ohio
- Coordinates: 39°57′39″N 83°00′54″W
- Area: Less than one acre
- Built: 1892
- Architect: John Flynn
- Architectural style: Romanesque Revival
- NRHP reference No.: 16000595
- Added to NRHP: September 2, 2016

Engine House No. 6, also known as the East Franklinton Engine House, is a former Columbus Fire Department station in the East Franklinton neighborhood of Columbus, Ohio. The building was constructed in 1892, designed in the Romanesque Revival style by John Flynn. The station was decommissioned in 1966, and served as an electronics store from 1975 to 2014. It was listed on the National Register of Historic Places in 2016, accompanying planned renovations. The station has been planned to be sold since about 2016, originally to the Columbus Historical Society and Heritage Ohio, though the latter organization now plans to move to the Ohio History Center. The historical society acquired the building in November 2021, and is restoring it with plans to turn it into the city's first permanent local history museum.

The station is one of two remaining Columbus fire stations designed by Flynn, and one of seven 1890s fire stations remaining in the city.

== Design ==
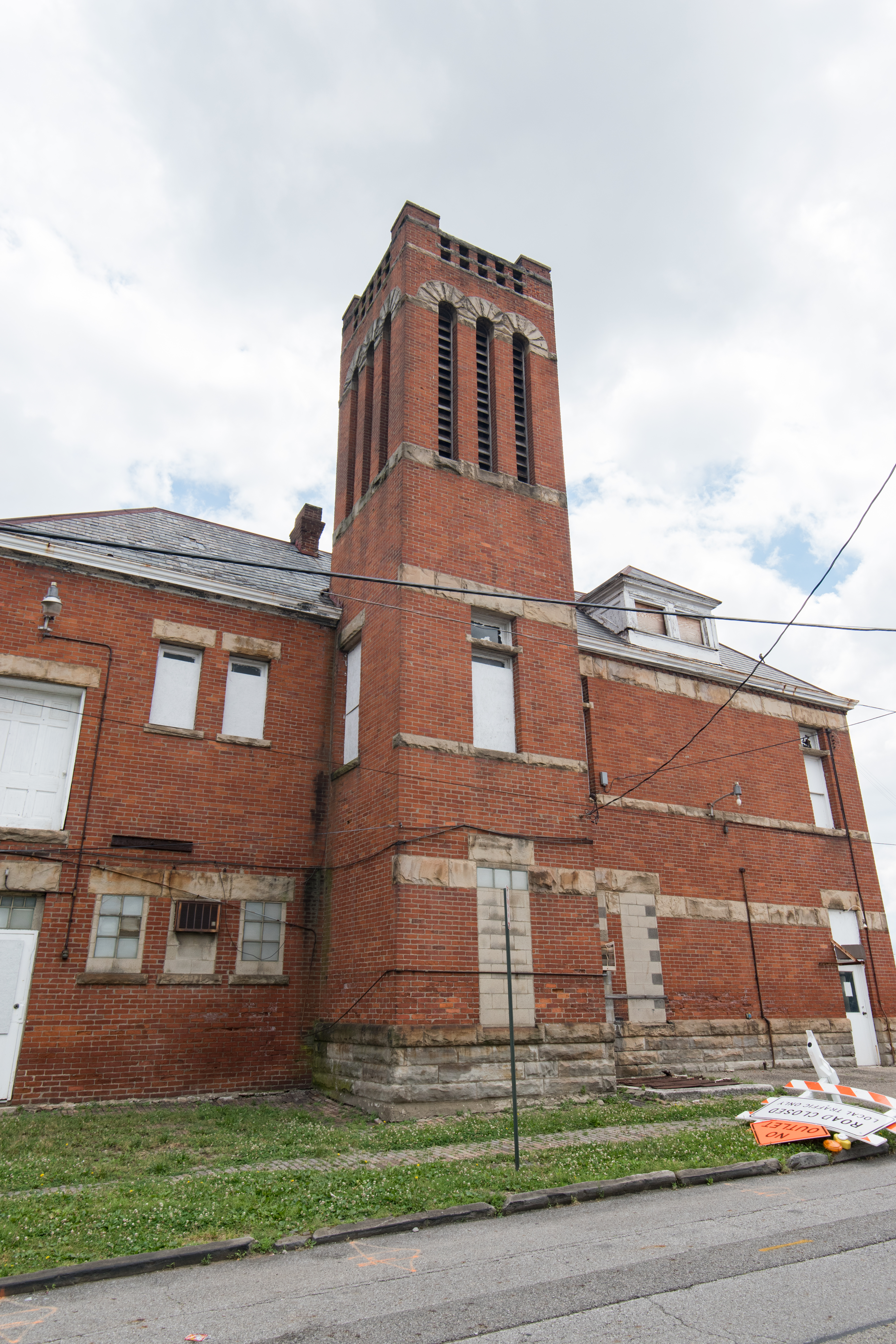
West side and hose tower

The building, completed in 1892, was designed by John Flynn with Romanesque Revival architecture. The two-story building utilizes brick and limestone, and is approximately 44 feet wide and 64 feet long. The area in which it was built was primarily residential from the late 1800s to the middle of the 20th century, but most of the area was converted to commercial, primarily industrial uses beginning in the 1950s. The building remains largely intact, although some of its front-facing windows and doors have been filled in.

The building's primary facade featured a row of windows above two large doorways for horse-drawn firefighting equipment. The doors and many of the windows have been infilled, though the facade's brick and limestone features remain largely intact. The building's 60-foot-tall hose tower stands out in its design and historical function for drying out hoses following use. The station also features stables and a feed loft, a remnant from when the station housed its equipment-bearing horses.

== History ==
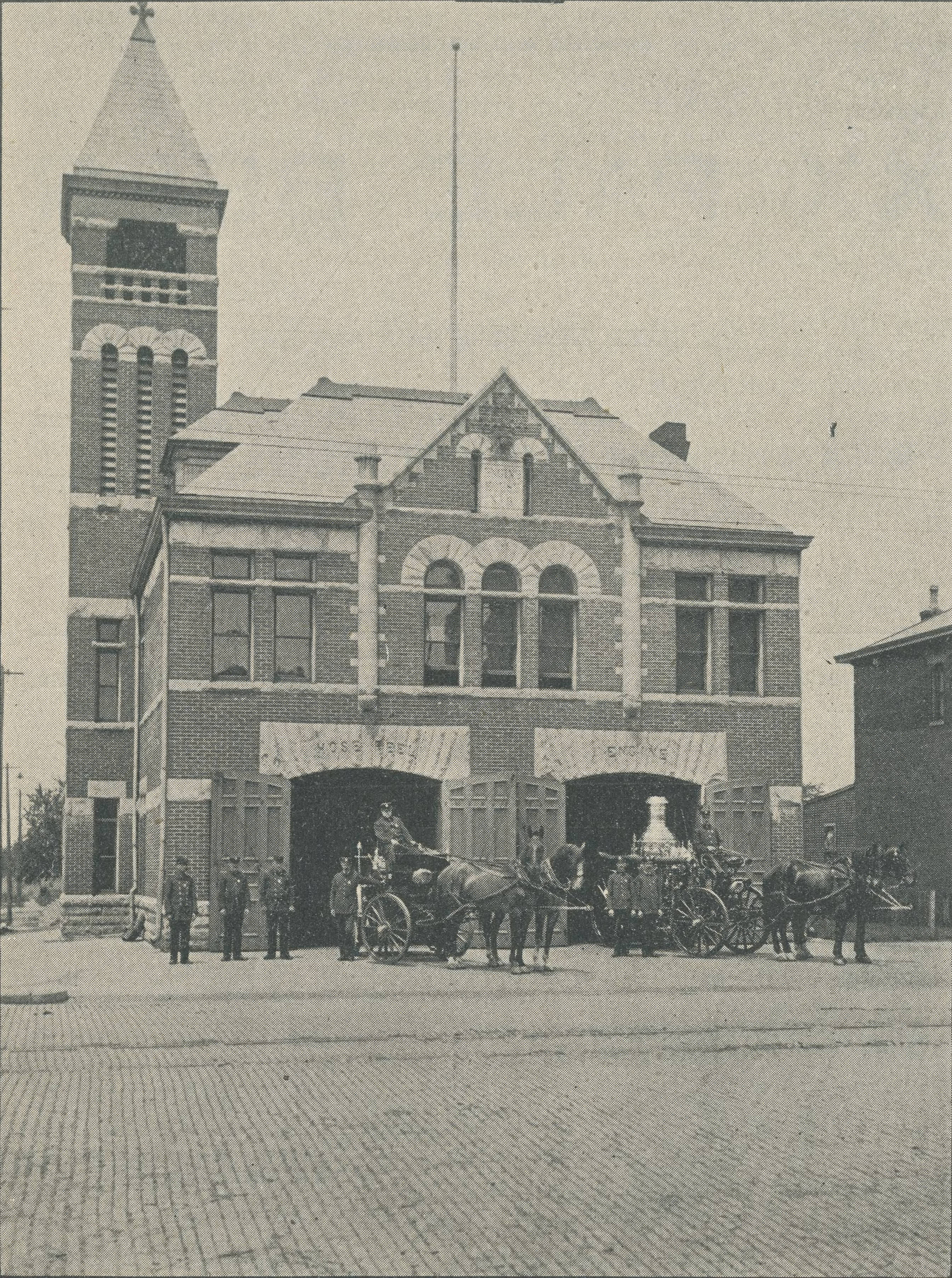
The fire station c. 1894

The building was completed in 1892 and decommissioned as a fire station in 1966. The station was in continuous service in that period, except during the Great Flood of 1913, when floodwaters reached its second story windows. A previous flood, in 1897, only formed several feet of water in its cellar. The building was offered for sale in 1967. William C. Rea purchased it that year for $48,000; he expressed plans to house an electronics store, drive-in Christian film office, and possibly a museum of the history of Franklinton. The building was home to Jimmy Rea Electronics from 1975 to 2014.

It was purchased by the Columbus Metropolitan Housing Authority (CMHA) in 2014, which built a housing project on the site, just east of the fire station. The station was planned to become the offices of Heritage Ohio, which sought a $1–2 million renovation around 2016, including for its first floor to be used for retail or a restaurant. Heritage Ohio and the housing authority successfully nominated the building to the National Register of Historic Places in 2016. In 2019, the Columbus Historical Society joined Heritage Ohio in a $450,000 purchase agreement, though by July 2020, Heritage Ohio decided the cost to obtain it was too high amid the 2020 coronavirus pandemic. The organization instead plans to move into part of the Ohio History Center, leaving the Columbus Historical Society to acquire the building. The 2019 agreement was terminated and the fire station was put on the market in September 2020. It received several bids above $450,000, though the CMHA took the building off the market again, preferring the building be purchased by the historical society if possible. The Columbus Historical Society raised funds in an attempt to purchase it. The society announced its successful acquisition of the building in November 2021.

== Status ==
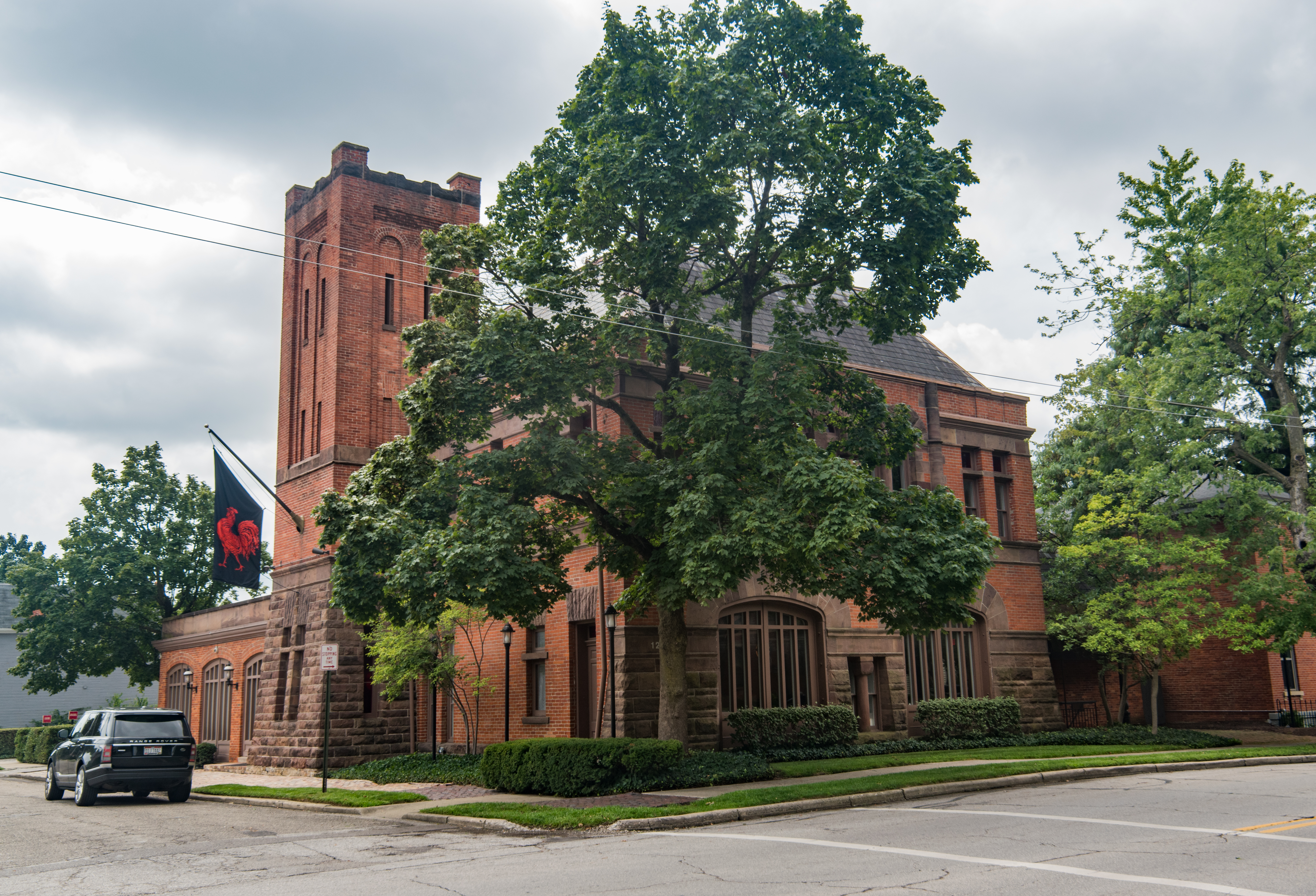
Flynn's Engine House No. 5

The station is one of about twelve built or reconstructed in the city in the 1880s to 1890s. Of these, seven remain, though in various conditions. Engine House No. 6 is in one of the best conditions, with its interior layout and construction materials largely as originally built. It is also only one of two remaining John Flynn-designed fire stations in Columbus; originally there were six. The other remaining early stations in Columbus are:

- Engine House No. 5, built in 1894, at 121 Thurman Avenue (also designed by Flynn)
- Engine House No. 7, built in 1888, at 31 Euclid Avenue
- Engine House No. 8, built in 1888, at 283 N. 20th Street
- Engine House No. 10, built in 1897, at 1096 W. Broad Street
- Engine House No. 11, built in 1897, at 1000 E. Main Street
- Engine House No. 12, built in 1897, at 734 Oak Street

== Gallery ==
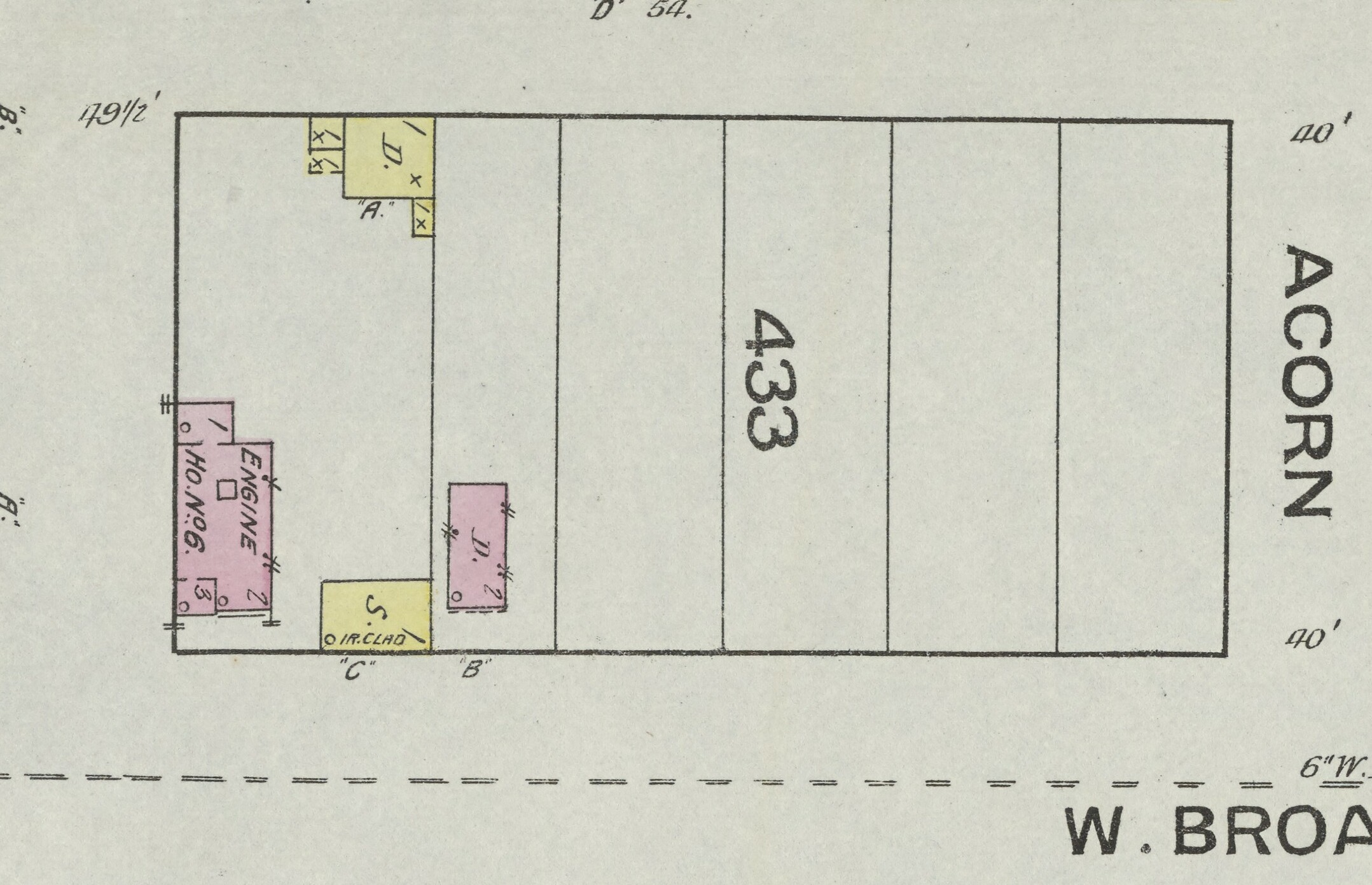
Former engine house, 1887

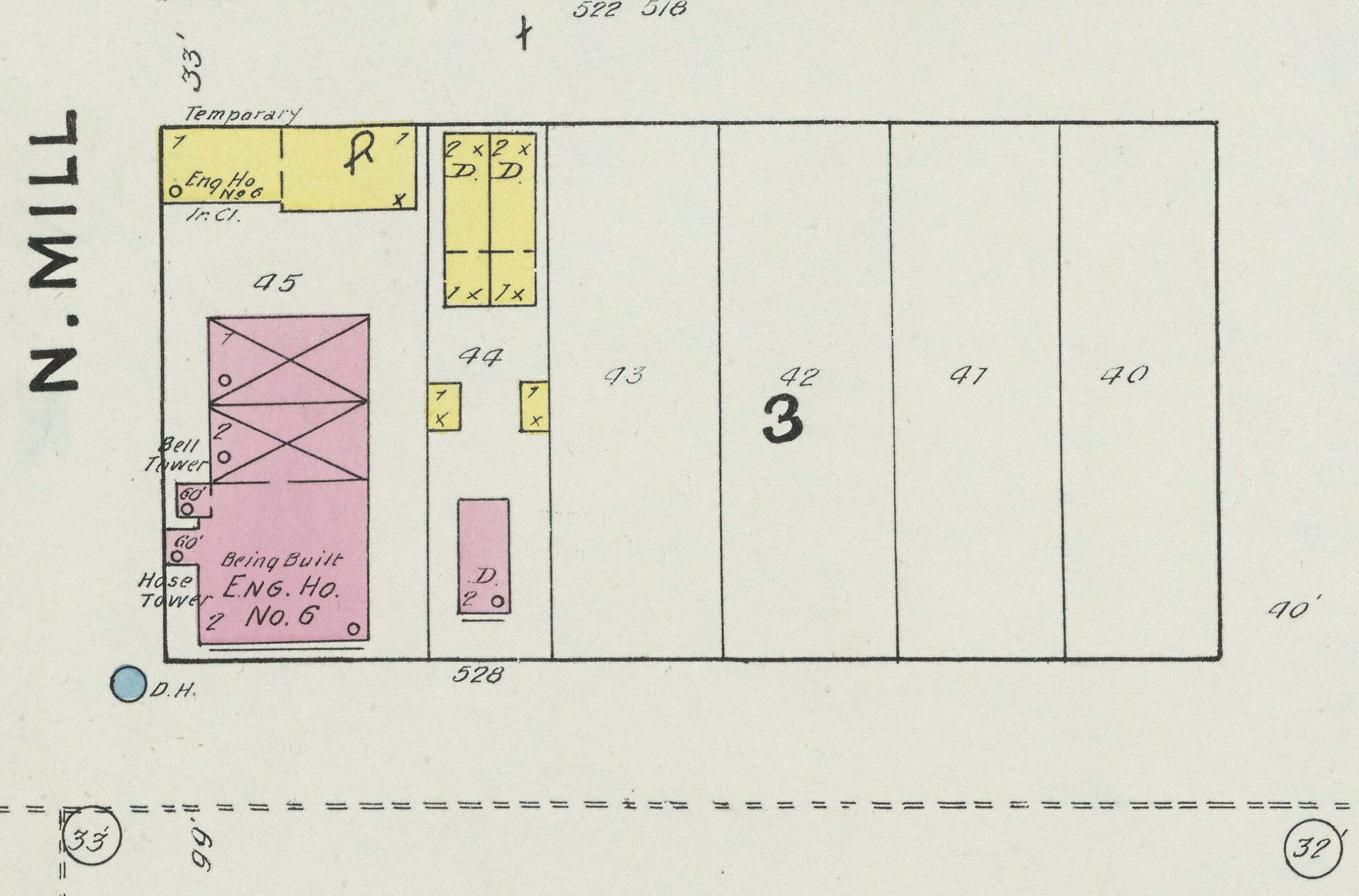
Current building being built, 1891

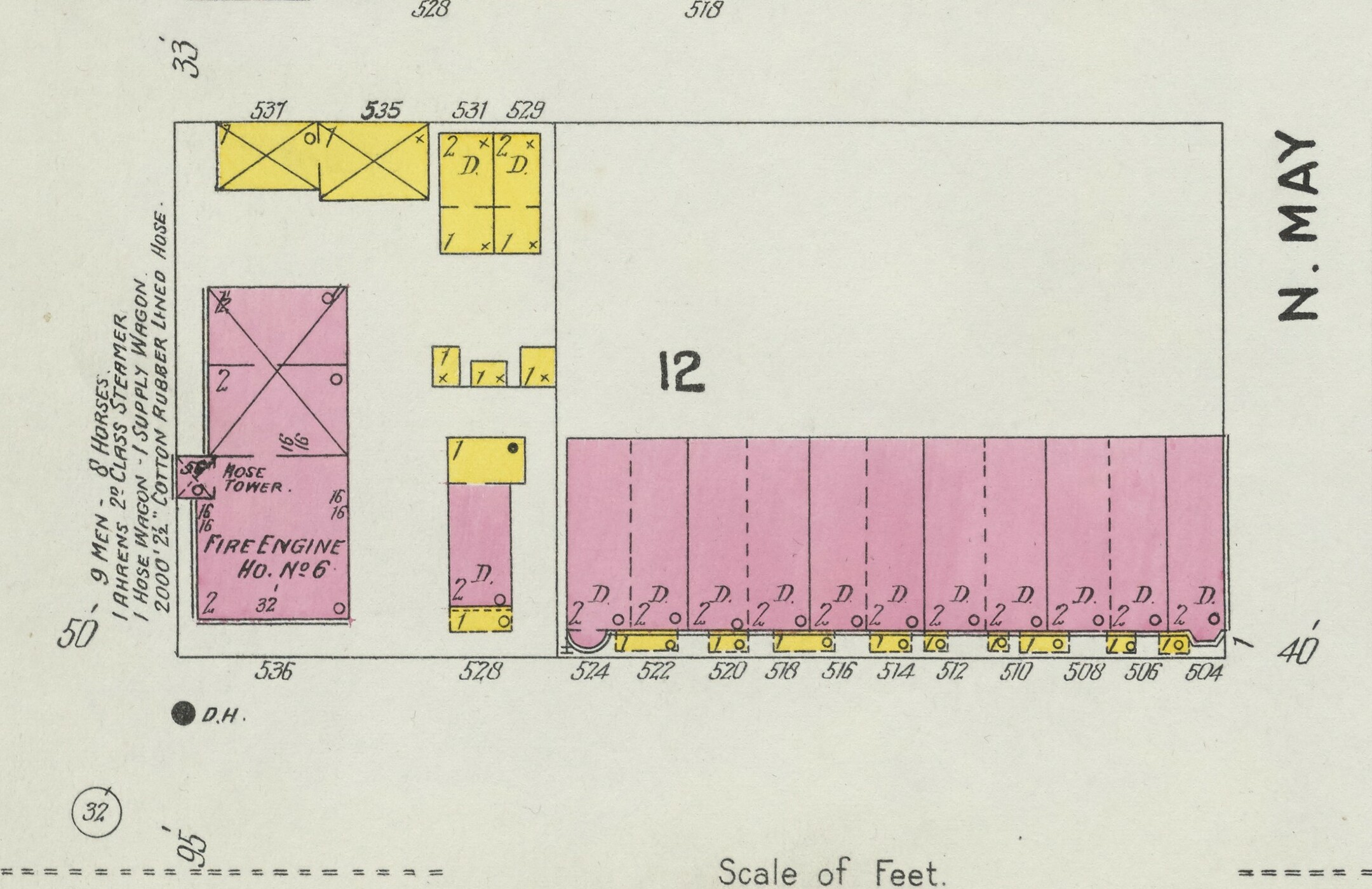
Engine house in 1901

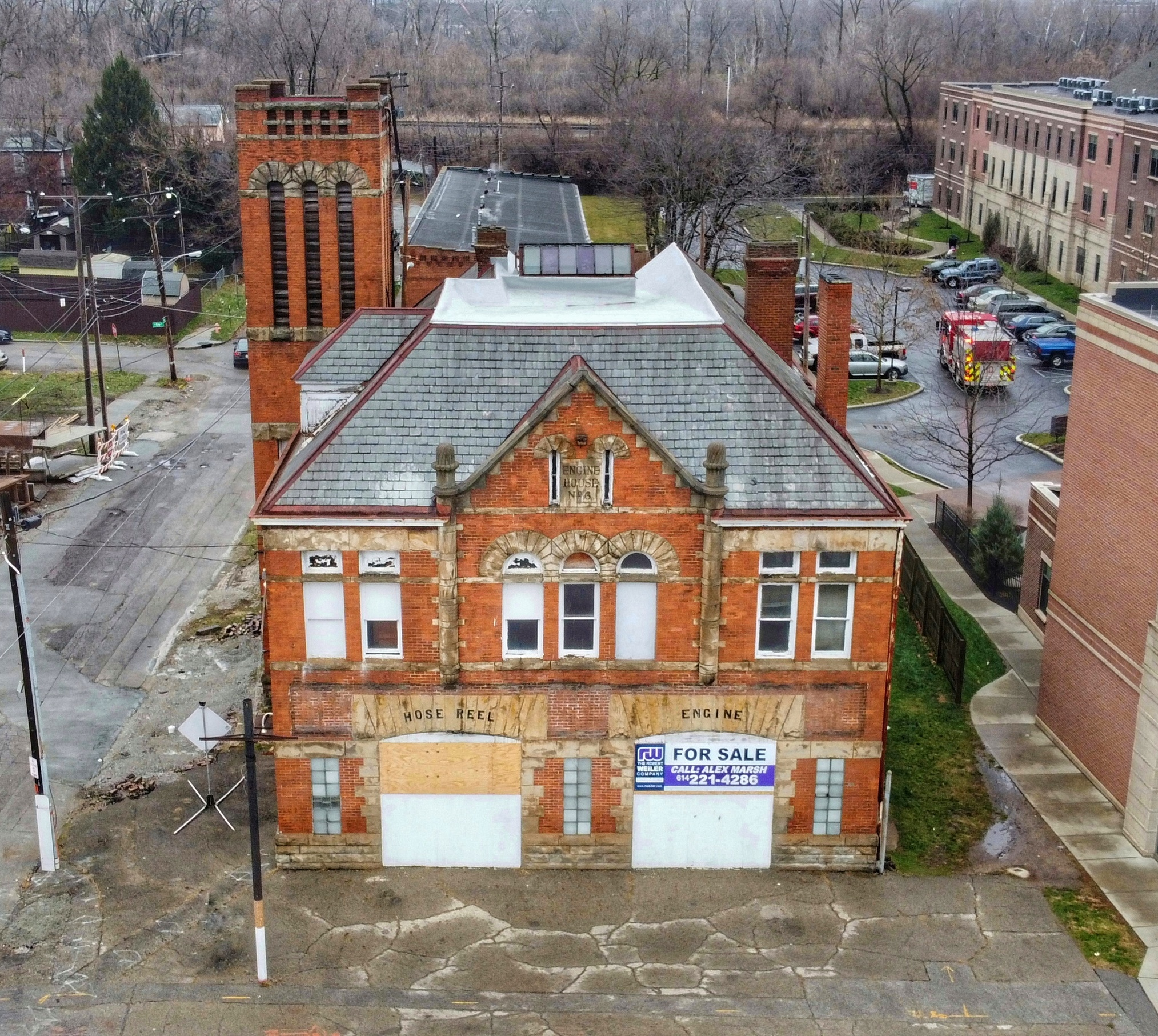
Main facade

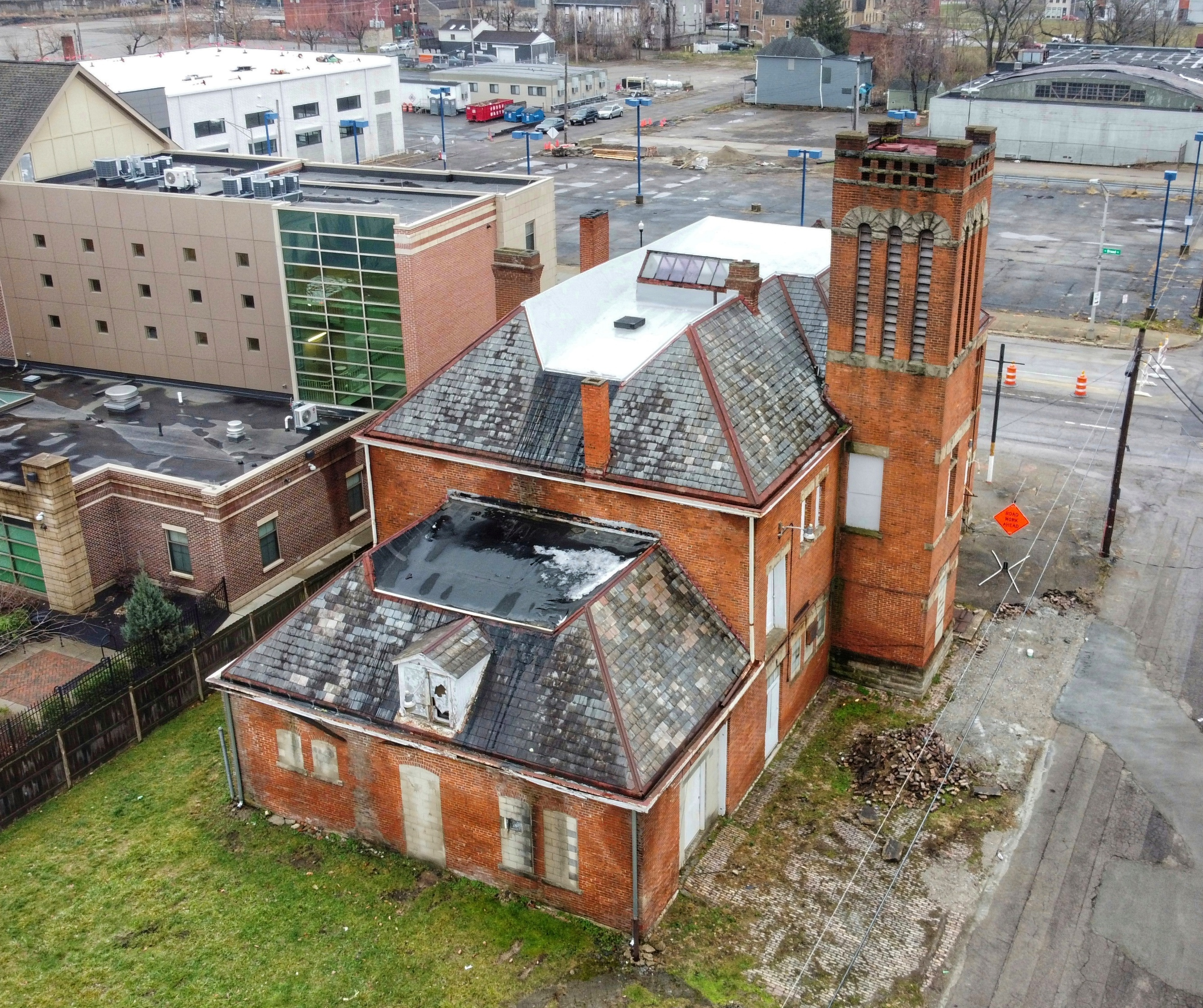
Building rear

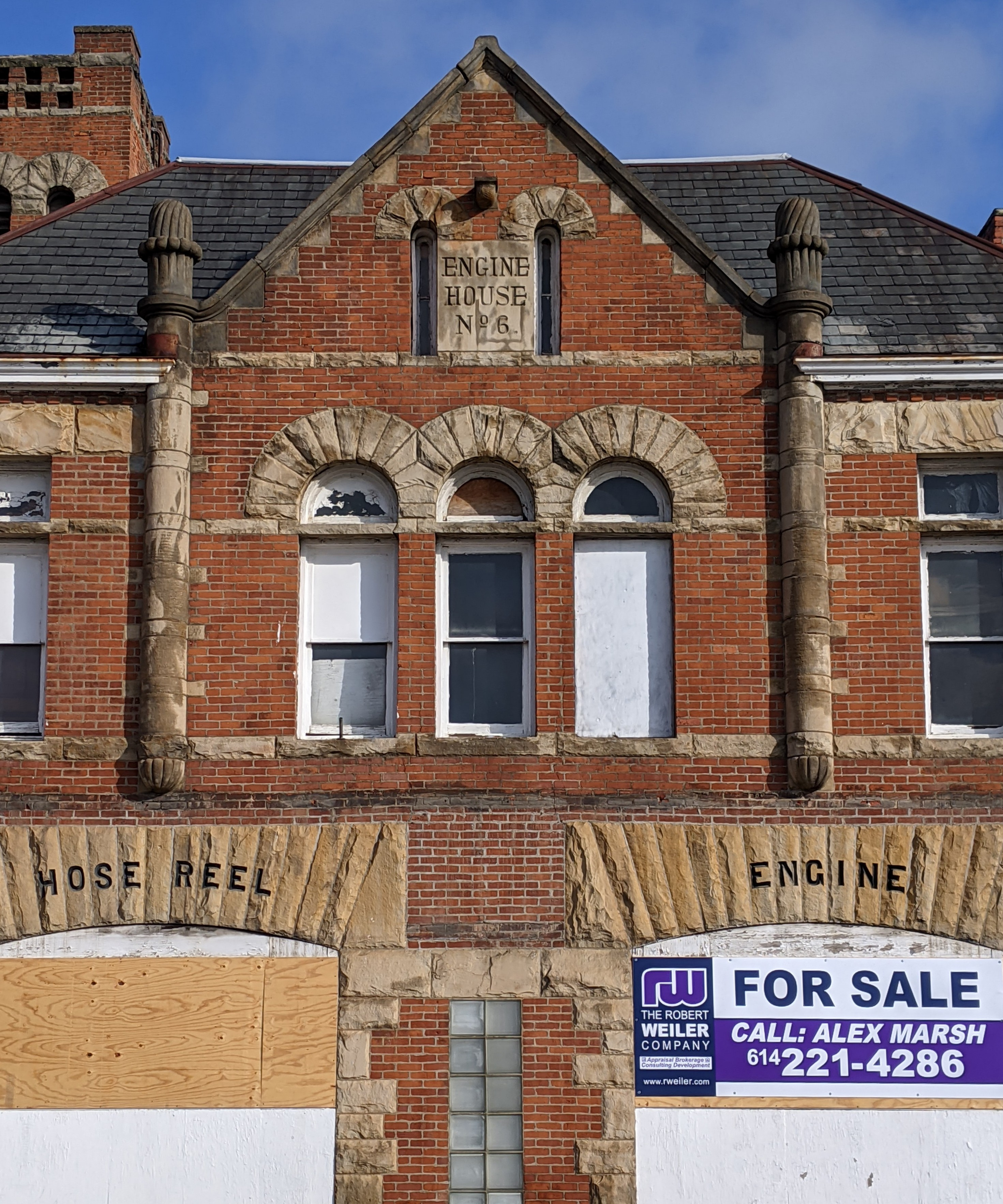
Main facade detail

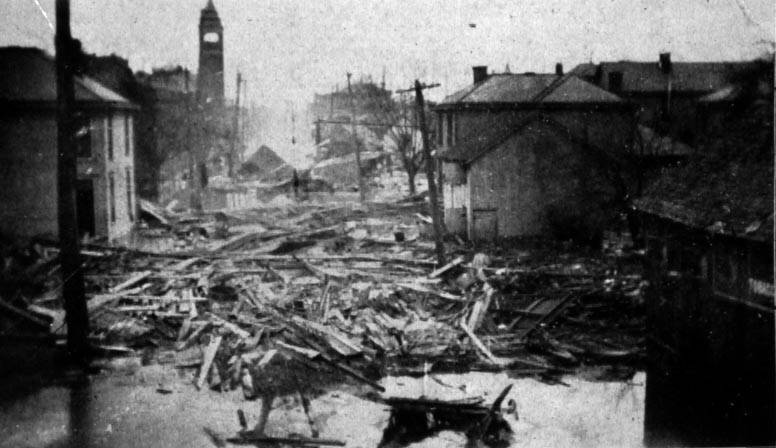
Looking south from Mill St. toward the station after the Great Flood of 1913

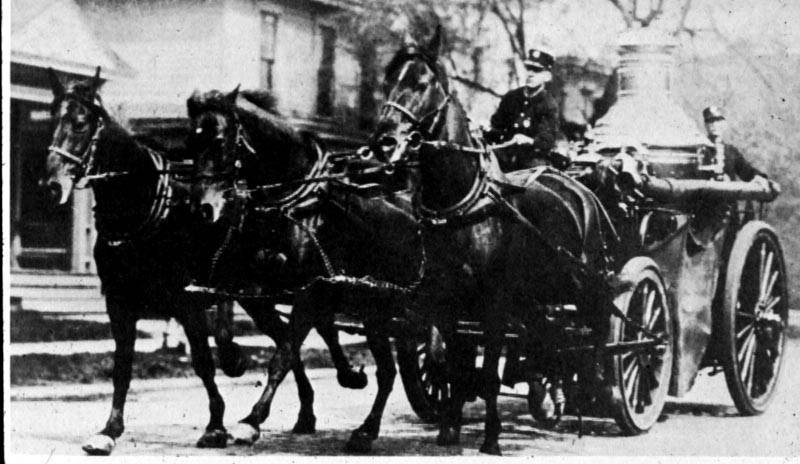
One of the station's steamers, 1919

== See also ==
- Fire stations in Columbus, Ohio
- List of museums in Columbus, Ohio
- National Register of Historic Places listings in Columbus, Ohio
