= Old Port Columbus Terminal =

- Old Port Columbus Airport Control Tower
- U.S. National Register of Historic Places
- Columbus Register of Historic Properties
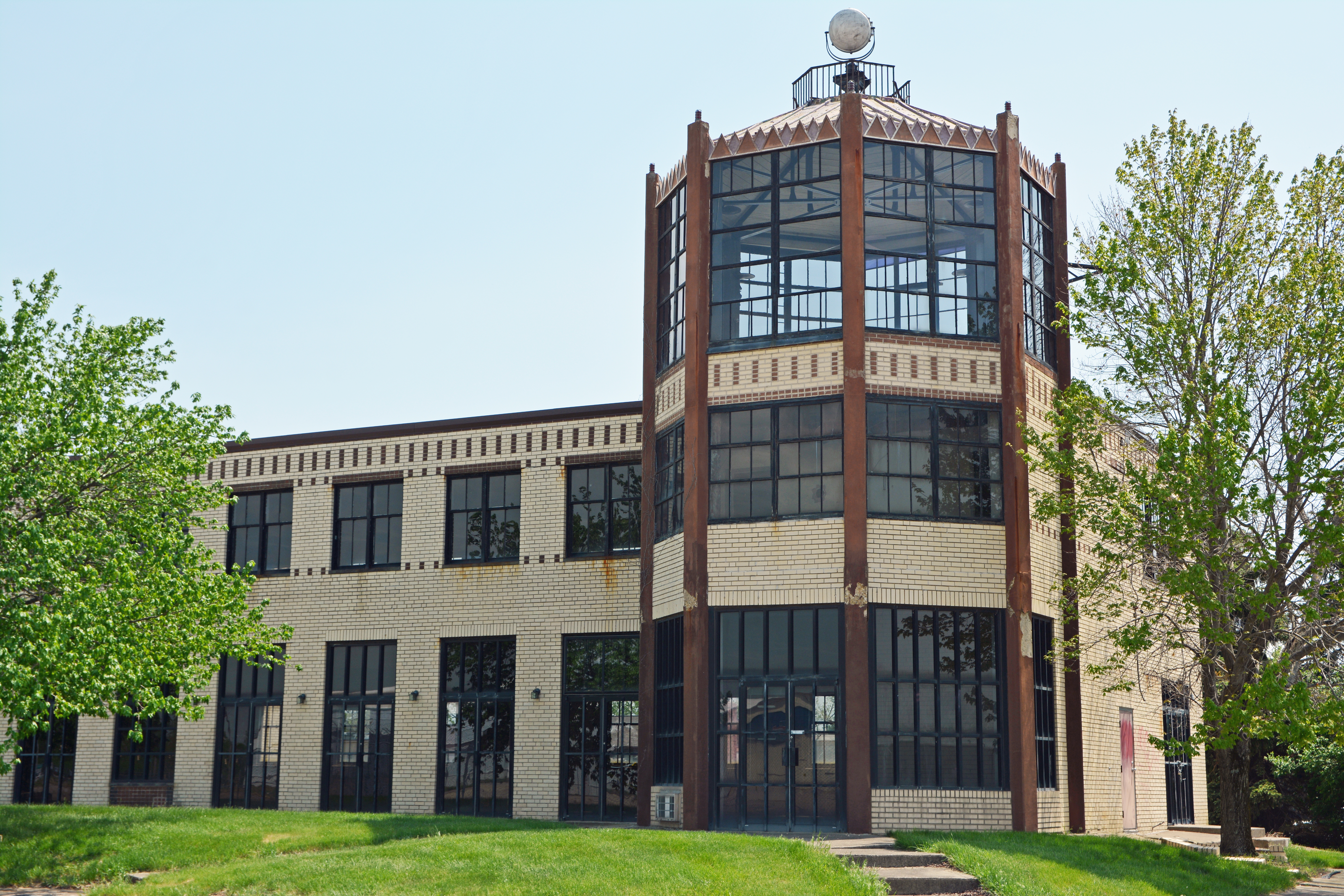
- Interactive map highlighting the building's location
- Location: 4920 E. 5th Ave., Columbus, Ohio
- Coordinates: 39.986854°N 82.871790°W
- Built: 1929
- NRHP reference No.: 79001839
- CRHP No.: CR-67

Significant dates
- Added to NRHP: July 26, 1979
- Designated CRHP: September 21, 2015

The Old Port Columbus Terminal, also known as the Old Port Columbus Airport Control Tower, is a historic building in Columbus, Ohio. It was built in 1929 as one of the first airport facilities in the United States. It was replaced by the current facilities in 1958. It was listed on the National Register of Historic Places in 1979. It is located on the southeast corner of John Glenn Columbus International Airport, formerly known as Port Columbus International Airport.

== Attributes ==
The terminal was designed in the Art Deco style popular at the time. The building has 12,000 square feet (1,100 m^{2}).

== History ==
The terminal was designed by the Allied Architects Association and engineered by Robert Harris Simpson, a prominent civil engineer from Columbus, Ohio. The terminal was constructed in 1929 and opened on July 8 of that year on a site chosen by aviator Charles Lindbergh. The dedication ceremony was attended by notable figures including Charles Lindbergh, Amelia Earhart, Henry Ford and Harvey Firestone, highlighting its national significance. At its opening, it was the easternmost airport in the Transcontinental Air Transport (later TWA) airline's coast-to-coast route, requiring visitors from New York to take a train to Columbus, fly to Oklahoma, take a train to New Mexico, and board a second flight to Los Angeles.

The building was listed on Columbus Landmarks' Most Endangered Sites in 2015. In that year, Heartland Bank shuttered its plans to lease and renovate the building and withdrew its historic tax credit application, stating that it was not economically feasible to restore the structure. In 2016, the building's roof was replaced and mold was removed.

In 2020, the nonprofit Ohio Air & Space Hall of Fame and Museum (OAS) announced it signed a long-term lease to the building. The organization is planning for a $2 million renovation of the building, which was to be followed by the opening of its museum and hall of fame in late 2021. The organization also plans for a historical archive, a STEAM education center, and an event and meeting space in the terminal building. By 2022, the organization had raised $1.2 million, and estimated the total project at $4 million. The organization's director plans to start the first construction phase in 2023, with a goal of raising $700,000 to accommodate the work.

== See also ==
- List of museums in Columbus, Ohio
- National Register of Historic Places listings in Columbus, Ohio
