= Old Oaks Historic District =

- Neighborhood in Columbus
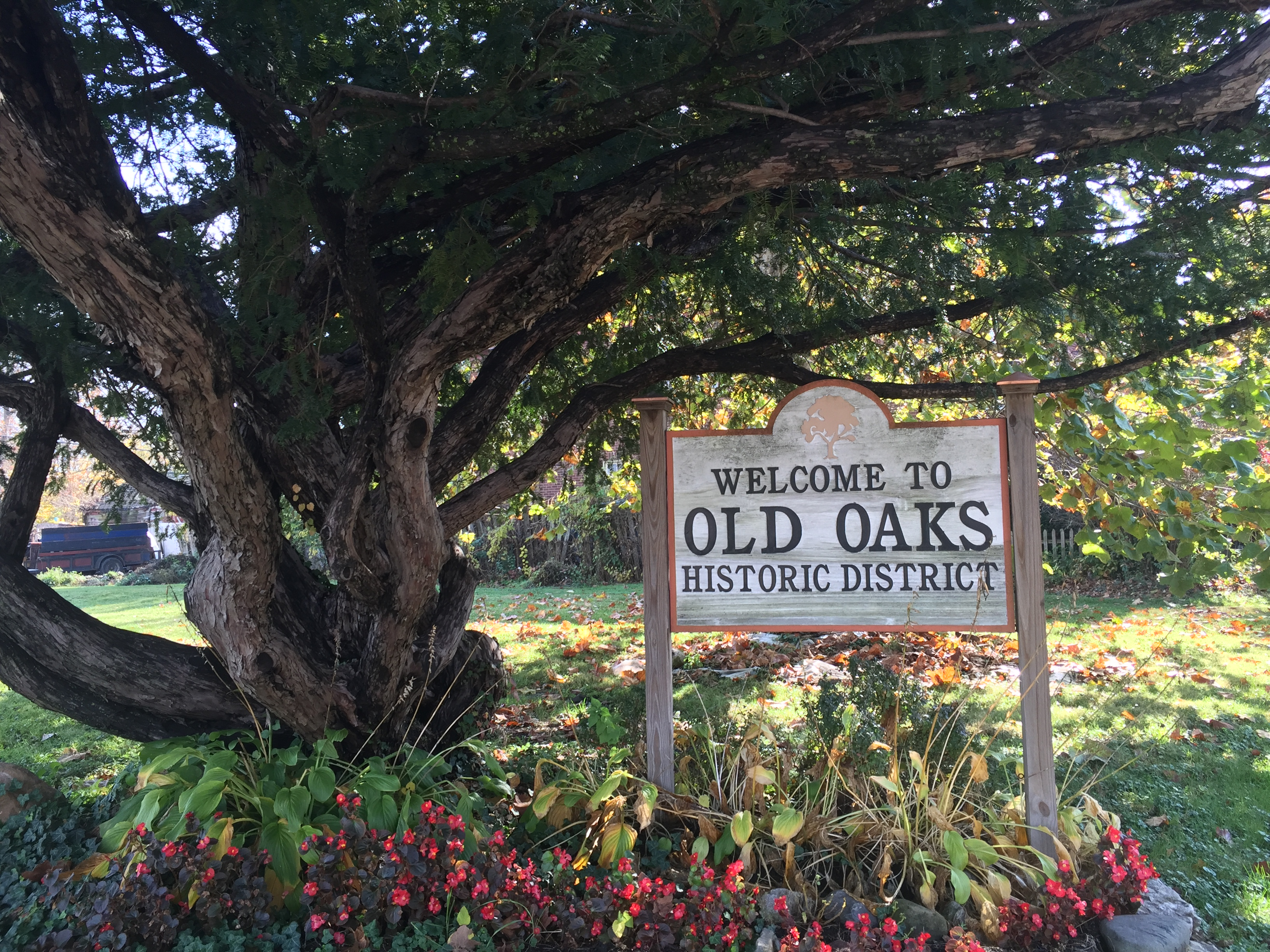
- A welcome sign to the Old Oaks Historic District
- Interactive map highlighting the district among other historic sites
- Coordinates: 39°57′05″N 82°58′03″W
- Country: United States
- State: Ohio
- County: Franklin
- City: Columbus
- ZIP Code: 43205
- Area code: 614

Columbus Register of Historic Properties
- Designated: September 23, 1986
- Reference no.: CR-41

Old Oaks Historic District, or Old Oaks, is a neighborhood just south and east of downtown Columbus, Ohio and is an example of a streetcar suburb in the city.

== History ==
The Old Oaks Historic District was founded as a streetcar suburb in 1891 when streetcar service in Columbus became electrified. In 1892, a group of developers platted the Oakwood Addition subdivision. A notable landmark, St. John's Catholic Parsonage and School, was built in 1898, with neighborhood construction taking place throughout the thirty-year period from 1892 to 1922.

Old Oaks became a historic district in 1986 after a group of neighbors petitioned the city for the designation. Area residents went door to door to collect signatures from homeowners who indicated they wanted the historic district designation.

Today, Old Oaks is the most intact of Columbus's turn-of-the-century streetcar era neighborhoods that shows the homes of the middle and upper classes. Homeowners were and are an economically, ethnically and religiously diverse group of people. Architectural styles include American Foursquares in Mission and Colonial Revival styles, as well as modified Queen Annes. Homes in the district show a predominance of architectural consistency with 2 ½ story brick homes that boast large front porches.

=== Holy Rosary-St. John Catholic Church ===
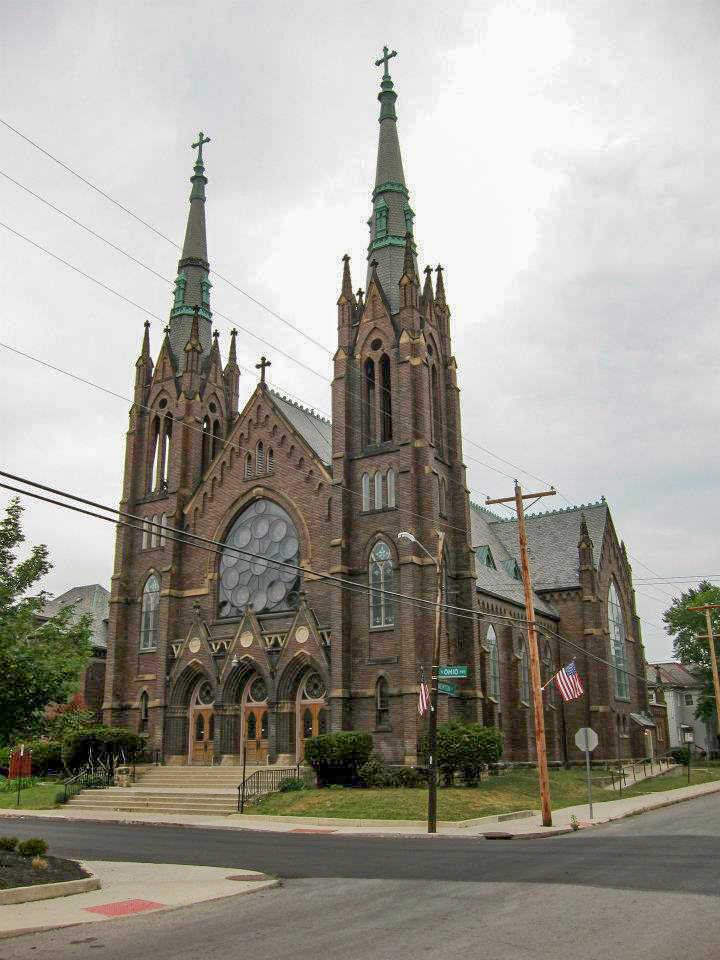
The Church of St. John the Evangelist

Holy Rosary-St. John Catholic Church was planned for the Catholics of the newer section of the city in the vicinity of Ohio and Livingston avenues, which were rapidly building up with comfortable and substantial homes. The work of organization was given to Rev. S. P. Weisinger on June 13, 1898, who prosecuted it with so much success that a little over a year later the new Church of St. John the Evangelist on Ohio avenue was completed and was dedicated on September 24 by Monsignor Specht, V. G. A residence for the pastor was completed at the same time. In 1905, a school building was erected, adding greatly to the value and appearance of the church property. The church is built in Gothic Revival architecture. The convent was built in 1908.

== Geography ==
Old Oaks is a small neighborhood approximately one mile east of, and just south of downtown. The community is bounded by Mooberry Street to the north, East Livingston Avenue to the south, South Ohio Avenue to the west, and Kimball Place to the east. Neighborhoods surrounding the area include Livingston Park, Driving Park, and Olde Towne East, including the Bryden Road Historic District. Old Oaks covers an area of only about 7 blocks by 3 blocks with a total land area of .109 square miles.

=== Transportation ===
This neighborhood is served by COTA lines 1 on East Livingston Avenue and 22 on South Ohio Avenue/South Champion Avenue.

== Demographics ==
The Old Oaks Historic District consists of 346 households with a total population of 1061 residents. The racial make-up of this neighborhood based on 2020 US Census results was 64% African American, 28.3% Caucasian, 3% another ethnicity, and 4.7% reported being multi-racial.

== Notable people ==
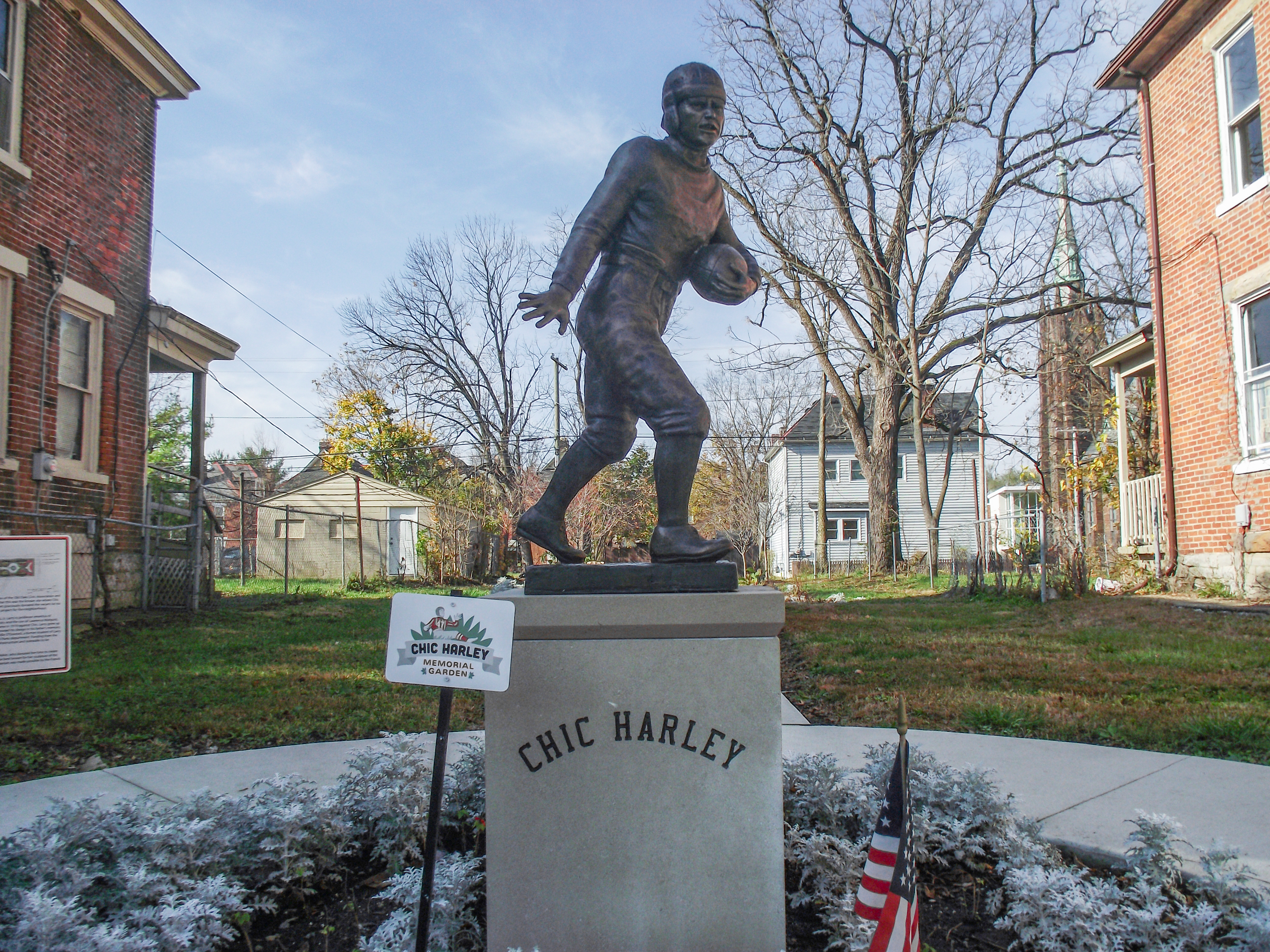
The Chic Harley Memorial Garden includes a statue of Harley

- Chic Harley, one of the outstanding American football players of the first half of the 20th century and the player who first brought the Ohio State University football program to national attention.
- William R. Gault, president of the Columbus Stock Yards

== Gallery ==
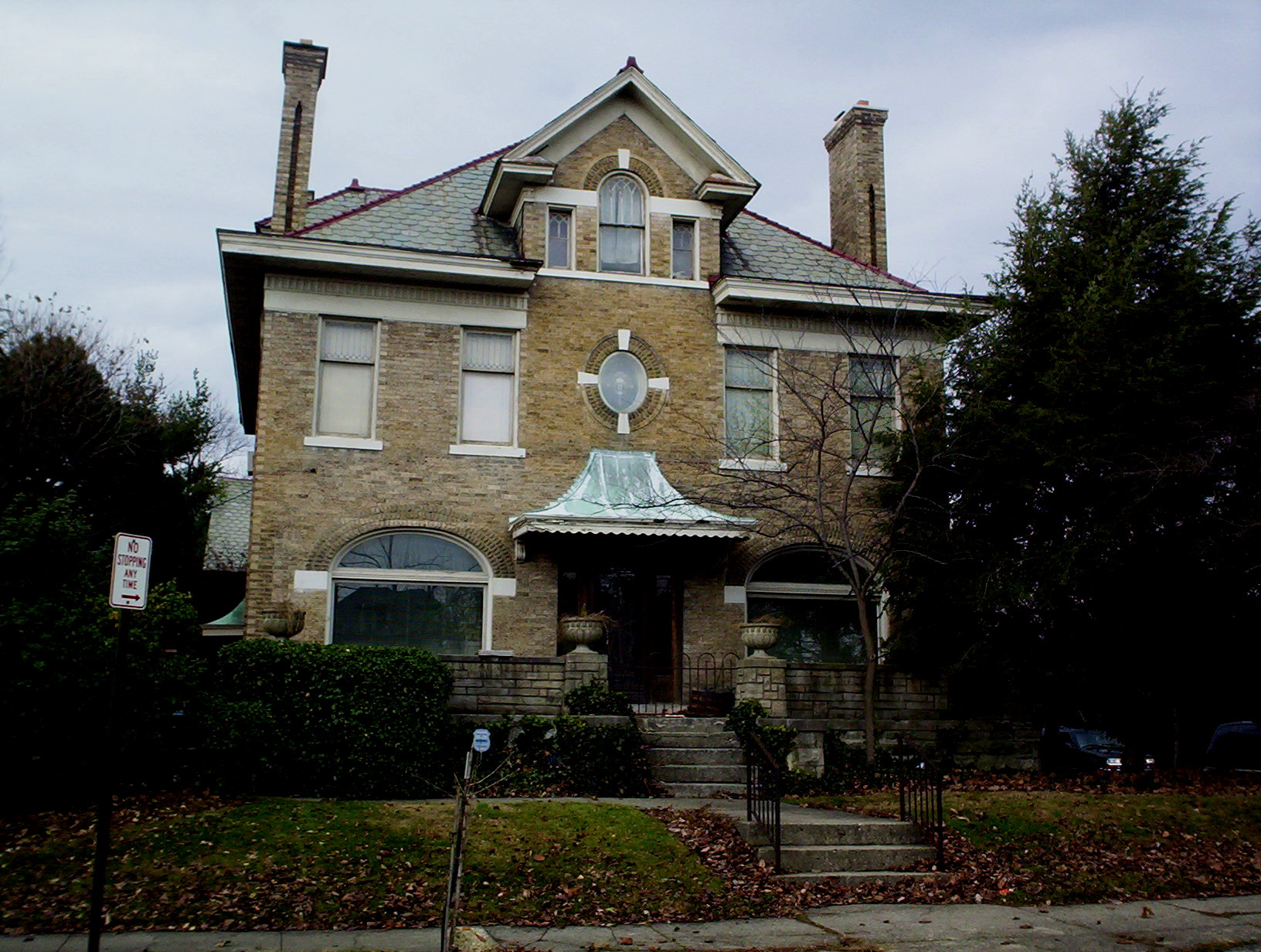
A house in Old Oaks

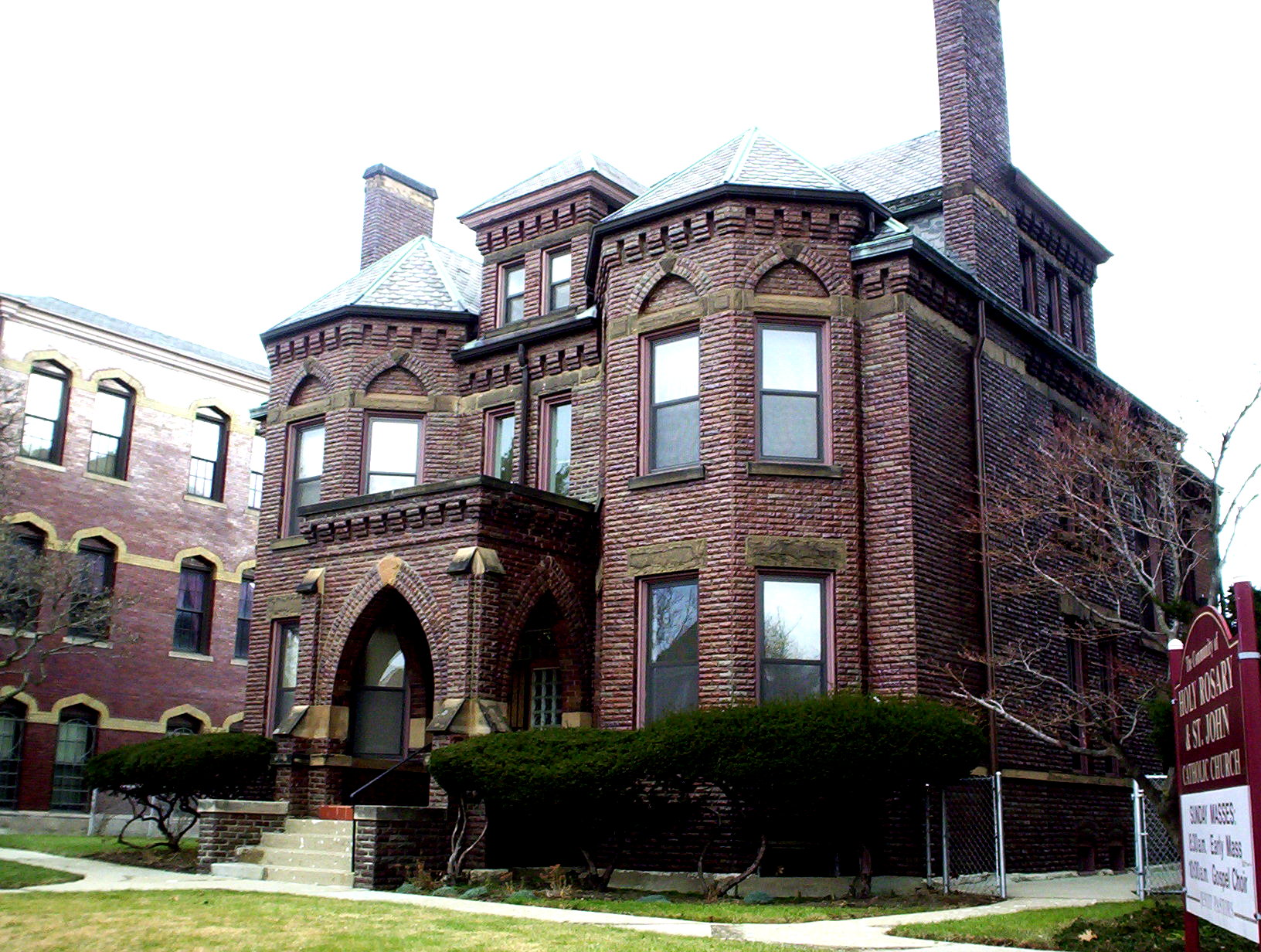
Church parsonage on S. Ohio Avenue

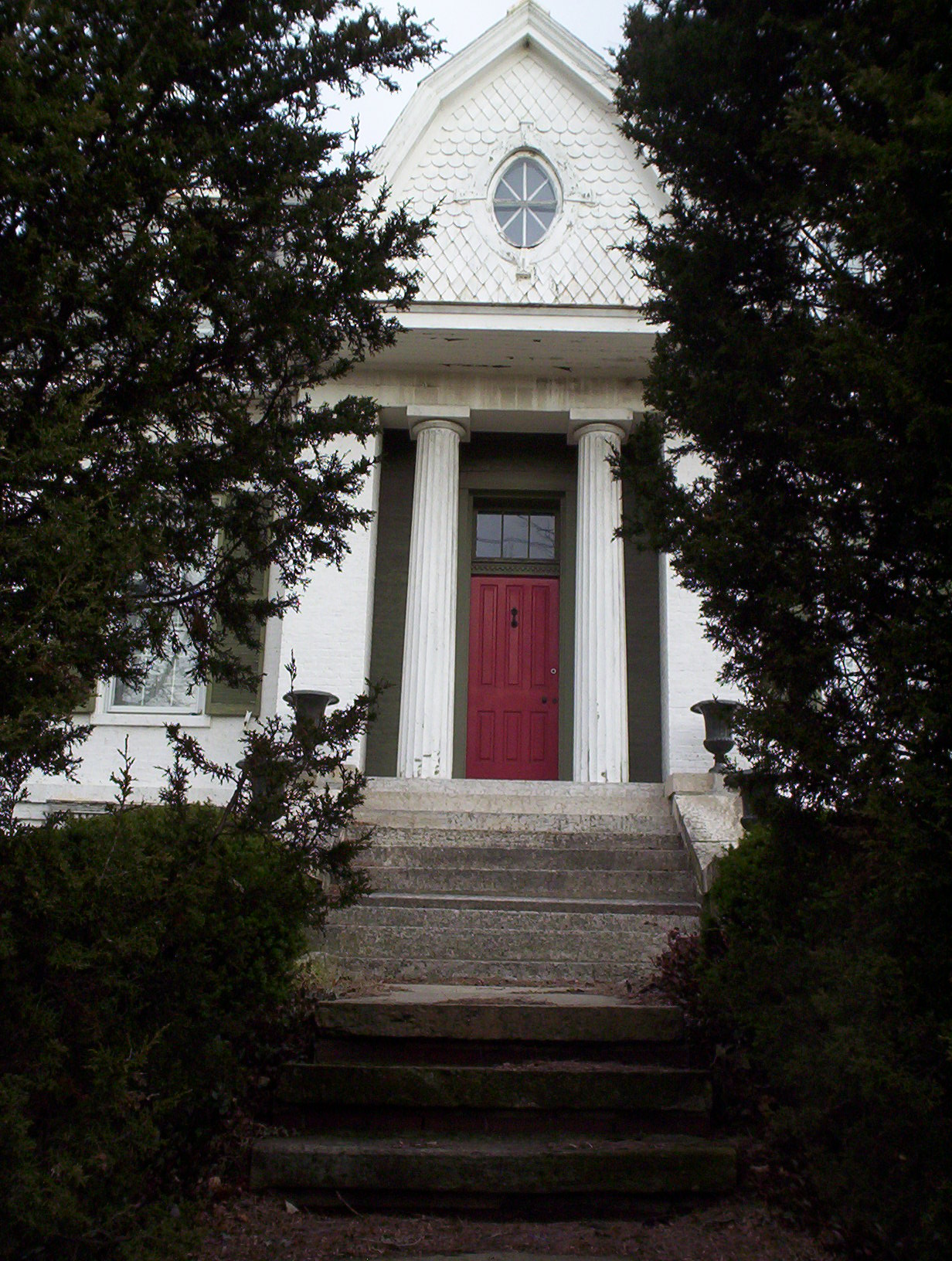
Home on Livingston Avenue

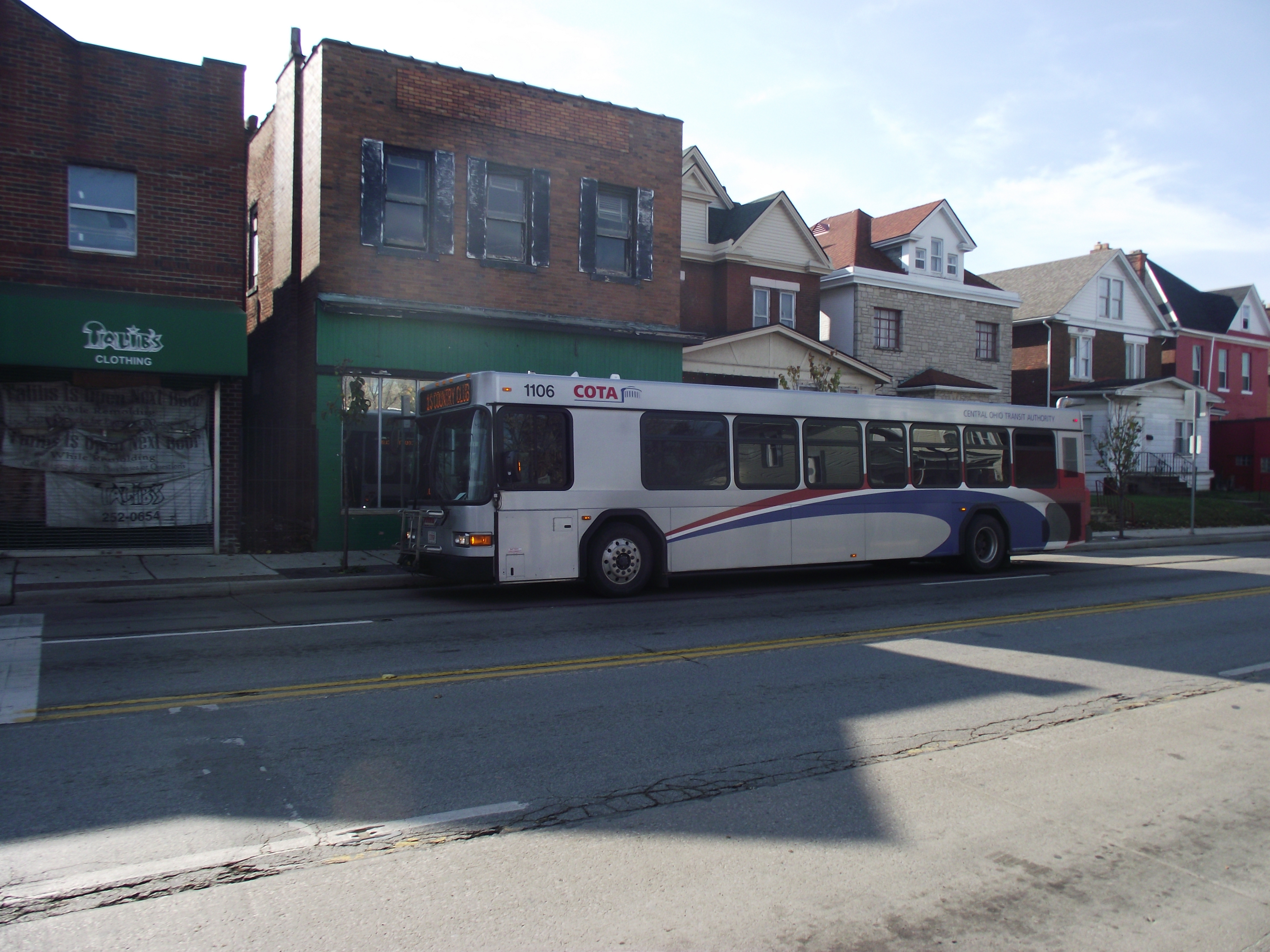
A COTA bus on Livingston Avenue

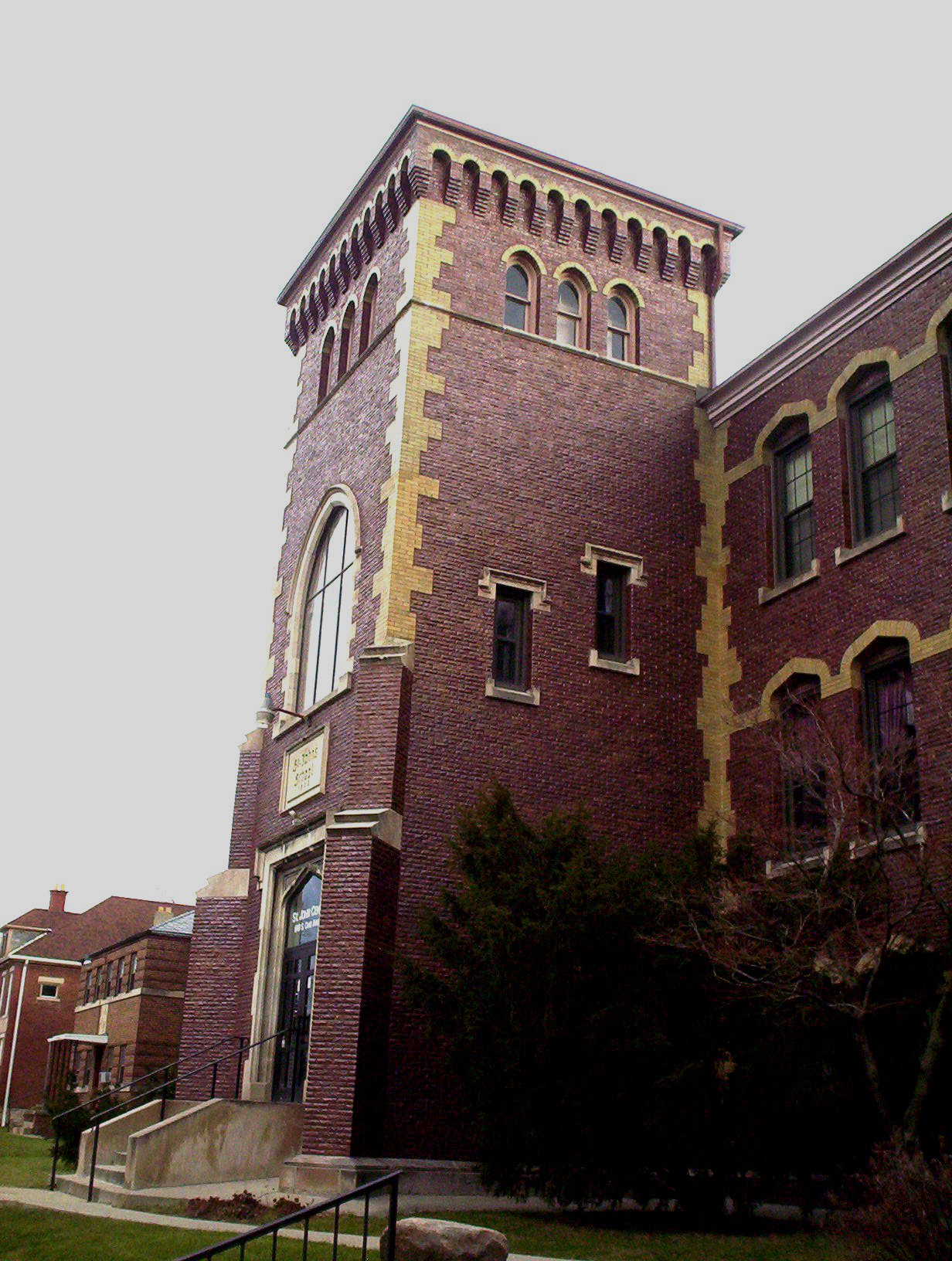
St. John Learning Center
