= Alum Crest High School (Columbus, Ohio) =

Location
- 2200 Winslow Drive; Columbus, (Franklin County), Ohio 43207; United States
- Coordinates: 39°55′34″N 82°56′14″W

Information
- Type: Public, Coeducational high school
- School district: Columbus City Schools
- Grades: 9-12
- Colors: Green and Gold
- Mascot: Dragon
- Website: District Website

Alum Crest High School was a public high school located in Columbus, Ohio. It was part of Columbus City Schools. Designed to meet the needs of emotionally disturbed students, Alum Crest High School prepared young men and women to successfully achieve the goal of graduating from Columbus Public Schools. However, the school was sold in March 2015 and merged with Clearbrook Middle School, and together are now Columbus Scioto 6–12.
