= Gen. William Henry Harrison Headquarters =

Historic house in Ohio, United States

- General William Henry Harrison Headquarters
- U.S. National Register of Historic Places
- Columbus Register of Historic Properties
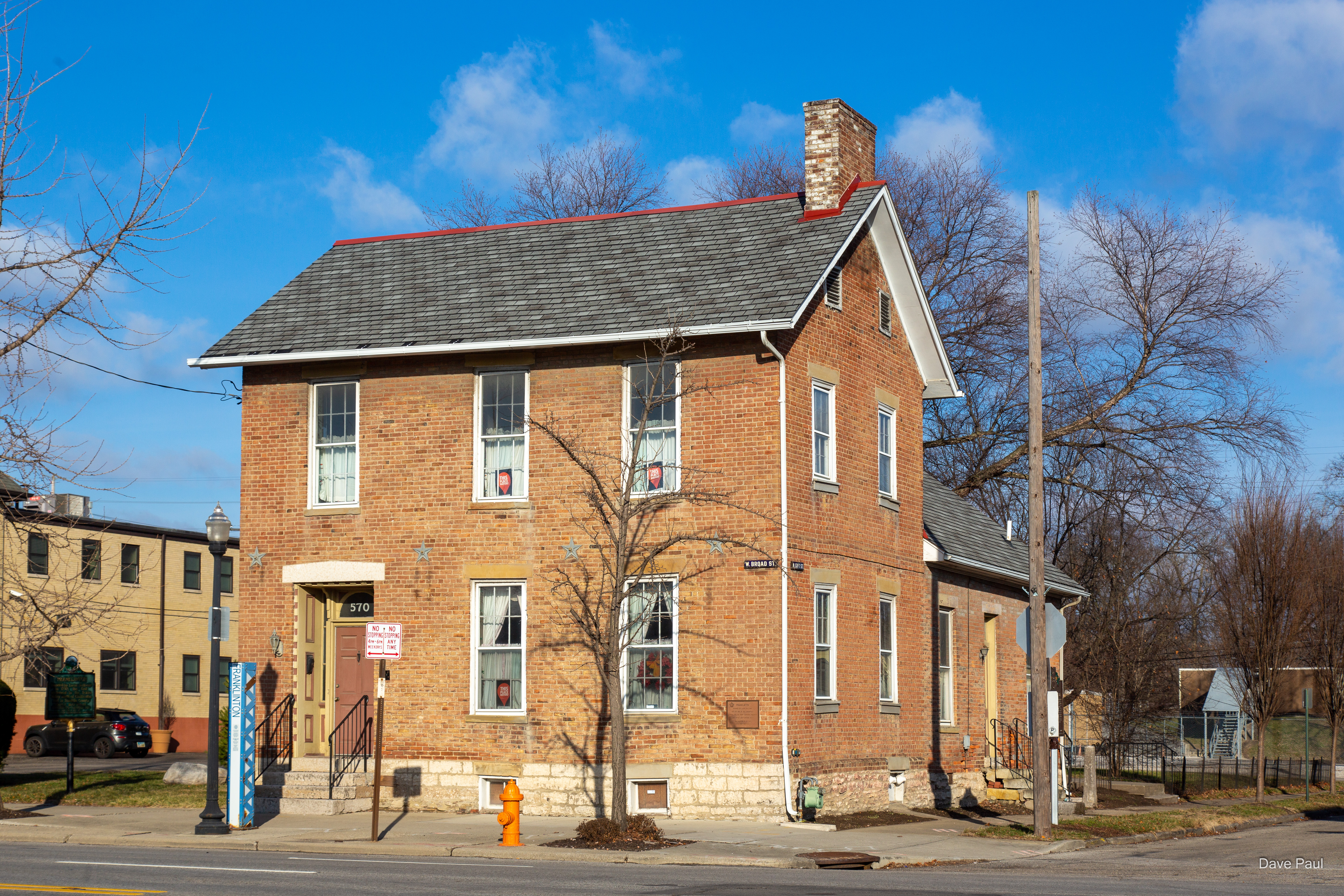
- Interactive map highlighting the building's location
- Location: 570 W. Broad St., Columbus, Ohio
- Coordinates: 39°57′38″N 83°00′57″W
- Area: Less than one acre
- Built: 1807
- Architectural style: Federal
- NRHP reference No.: 72001010
- CRHP No.: CR-40

Significant dates
- Added to NRHP: December 15, 1972
- Designated CRHP: August 1, 1985

The General William Henry Harrison Headquarters is a historic building in the East Franklinton neighborhood of Columbus, Ohio. It was listed on the National Register of Historic Places in 1972 and the Columbus Register of Historic Properties (along with the Sullivant Land Office) in 1985. The brick house was built in 1807 by Jacob Oberdier, one of Franklinton's first settlers. The house became especially important to the area from 1813 to 1814, when General William Henry Harrison, later the 9th President of the United States, used the house as his headquarters. It is the only remaining building in Ohio associated with Harrison.

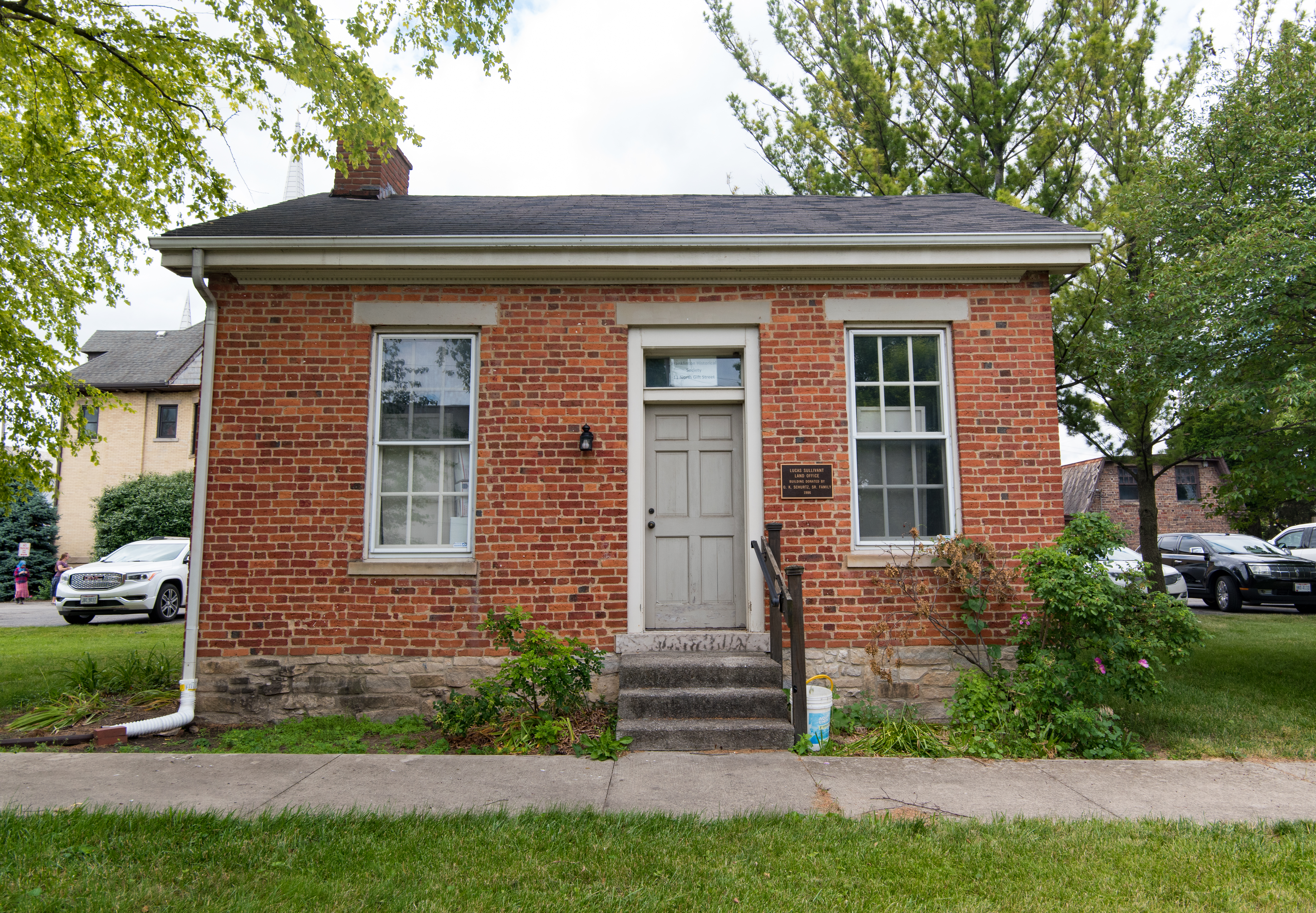
The Sullivant Land Office, co-listed on the Columbus Register of Historic Properties

== See also ==
- National Register of Historic Places listings in Columbus, Ohio
