= Fire stations in Columbus, Ohio =

Interactive map of active CFD fire stations

This is a list of historical and operating fire stations in Columbus, Ohio, part of the Columbus Division of Fire (CFD). Buildings in this list are grouped by station number and are sortable by name, date, and status.

Most of the stations' official names date to 2002, when they were designated by the department in memory of firefighters or in honor of the surrounding neighborhoods.

== Early engine houses ==
Name	Dates of CFD operation	Image	Location	Status	Notes
Chemical House No. 1	1880–1896		736 Oak Street	Demolished	Originally called Hose House 5; remodeled in 1892 for Chemical Engine Company No. 1, made up of African-American firefighters. Replaced with Engine House No. 12
Chemical House No. 1	1897–1913		2105 W. Broad Street	Demolished	Housed Chemical Engine Company No. 1; closed when Engine House 17 opened.

== Numbered stations ==
Station number	Dates of CFD operation	Alternate names	Image	Location	Status	Notes
1	1854–1892	Gay Street Engine House / North Engine House / Engine House No. 1	More images	18 E. Gay Street	Demolished	On the site of the Ruggery Building
1	1892–1952	Engine House No. 1	More images	89 N. Front Street	Demolished	Served as headquarters of the fire department. Firefighters relocated around 1942, while police and fire communications crews and equipment were vacated in 1952. The building was razed in 1954.
1	1908–1982	Engine House No. 1 / 16	More images	260 N. Fourth Street	In use	Today the Central Ohio Fire Museum
1	1982–present	Station 1 and Station 9 Union Station Engine House		300 N. Fourth Street	In use	
2	1859–1876	South High Street Engine House / South Street Engine House		35 E. Fulton Street	Demolished	
2	1877–1892	Engine House No. 2 / Fulton Street Fire Engine House		35 E. Fulton Street	Demolished	
2	1892–1962	Engine House No. 2	More images	27 E. Fulton Street	Demolished	Demolished for the interstate
2	1962–2015	Engine House No. 2		150 E. Fulton Street	Demolished	Titled "Fire Station # 2–3" in the 1980s
2	2017–present	Station 2 John W. Nance Fire Station		150 E. Fulton Street	In use	
3	c. 1855–1962	Engine House No. 3 Donaldson Engine House; Central Engine House	More images	133 S. 3rd Street	Demolished	Expanded and retitled No. 3/Donaldson in 1872, after Luther Donaldson who helped secure better fire protection for Columbus. Served as headquarters until No. 1 opened in 1892. Expanded and renamed simply "Engine House No. 3" in 1894. Taken out of service December 8, 1962 and sold at auction in 1967.
3	1962–c. 2015	Engine House No. 2		150 E. Fulton Street	Demolished	Titled "Fire Station # 2–3" in the 1980s
3	2015–present	Station 3 Mitchell J. Brown Fire Station		222 Greenlawn Avenue	In use	Built on the site of CFD's administration building, training academy, maintenance building, and communications department.
4	1874–1892	Flowers Engine House		479 N. High Street	Demolished	Completed in June 1874. Evans & McAllister, a shoe store founded in 1888, moved into the building in 1892.
4	1892–1945	Engine House No. 4		147 E. Russell Street	Demolished	
4	1957–1975	Engine House No. 4		2266 Lockbourne Road	Demolished	Built as a fire station for Marion Township in 1941; incorporated into CFD in 1957; also included a former schoolhouse. The demolition permit was approved in 2021, as the structure was aging and there were concerns of a roof collapse.
4	1975–present	Station 4 Berwick Fire Station		3030 Winchester Pike	In use	
5	1894–1968	Engine House No. 5	More images	121 Thurman Avenue	In use	Renovated for restaurant use in 1974. Currently houses marketing company Big Red Rooster.
5	1972–present	Station 5 Olde Orchard Fire Station		211 McNaughten Road	In use	
6	1892–1966	Engine House No. 6	More images	540 W. Broad Street	Vacant	Planned to house the Columbus Historical Society
6	1969–present	Station 6 Sharon Woods Fire Station		5750 Maple Canyon Avenue	In use	
7	1888–c. 1965	Engine House No. 7	More images	27 Euclid Avenue	In use	Houses Communications Workers of America Local 4501
7	1966–present	Station 7 Buckeye Fire Station		1425 Indianola Avenue	In use	
8	1888–1968	Engine House No. 8	More images	283 N. 20th Street	In use	Part of the Franklin County Department of Job and Family Services' East Opportunity Center
8	1968–present	Station 8 Battalion Chief Herman Harrison Fire Station		1240 E. Long Street	In use	
9	1892–1961	Engine House No. 9		347 Buttles Avenue	Demolished	Demolished in February 1962
9	1961–1982	Engine House 9 Station 25; Henry "Hank" Gowdy Fire Station		739 W. 3rd Avenue	In use	
9	1982–present	Station 1 and Station 9 Union Station Engine House		300 N. Fourth Street	In use	
10	1897–2008	Engine House No. 10	More images	1096 W. Broad Street	Vacant	
10	2008–present	Station 10; Franklinton Engine House	More images	1080 W. Broad Street	In use	
11	1897–1970	Engine House No. 11	More images	1000 E. Main Street	In use	Used for offices
11	1970–1992	Station 11; Don Scott Fire Station			Demolished	Replaced by the current fire station
11	1992–present	Station 11; Don Scott Fire Station	Upload image	2200 W. Case Road	In use	Built at the same time and with the same design as Station 32.
12	1897–c. 1950s	Engine House No. 12	More images	734 Oak Street	In use	Primarily houses Gemüt Biergarten
12	1956–present	Station 12; Lieutenant Frank D. Grashel Fire Station		3200 Sullivant Avenue	In use	
13	1892–c. 1957	Engine House No. 13		2468 N. High Street	Demolished	Opened as Chemical Engine House No. 2, renamed in 1898. Demolished in 1957.
13	1967–present	Station 13; Olde North Columbus Fire Station		309 Arcadia Avenue	In use	
14	1907–2001	Engine House No. 14		1716 Parsons Avenue	Vacant	
14	2001–present	Station 14; North Graceland Engine House	Upload image	1514 Parsons Avenue	In use	
15	1907–1969	Engine House No. 15		650 E. Livingston Avenue	Demolished	Closed in 1969
15	1969–present	Station 15; Driving Park Fire Station		1800 E. Livingston Avenue	In use	
16	1908–1982	Engine House No. 1 / 16		260 N. Fourth Street	In use	Today the Central Ohio Fire Museum
16	2021–present	Station 16; Mock Orchard Fire Station	Upload image	1465 Oakland Park Avenue	In use	
17	1913–1994	Engine House No. 17	More images	2300 W. Broad Street	In use	Part of the West Side Family Health and Wellness Center
17	1994–present	Station 17; Hilltop Engine House	Upload image	2250 W. Broad Street	In use	
18	1926–2006	Engine House No. 18	Upload image	1551 Cleveland Avenue	In use	
18	2006–present	Station 18; Herbert F. Turner/South Linden Fire Station		1630 Cleveland Avenue	In use	
19	1932–present	Station 19; Lieutenant Jerry Kuhn/Northmoor Engine House	More images	3601 N. High Street	In use	Oldest active fire station in Columbus
20	1951–present	Station 20; Captain Pleasant Higgenbotham Fire Station	Upload image	2646 E. Fifth Avenue	In use	
21	1959–present	Station 21; Eastmoor Fire Station	Upload image	3294 E. Main Street	In use	
22	1959–present	Station 22; Lieutenant Jack Russ Southgate Fire Station	Upload image	3069 Parsons Avenue	In use	
23	1959–present	Station 23; Big Walnut Fire Station	Upload image	4451 E. Livingston Avenue	In use	
24	1960–present	Station 24; Northland Area Fire Station	Upload image	1585 Morse Road	In use	
25	1961–present	Engine House 9 Station 25; Henry "Hank" Gowdy Fire Station		739 W. 3rd Avenue	In use	
26	1975–present	Station 26; Hoffman Farms Fire Station	Upload image	5333 Fisher Road	In use	
27	1978–present	Station 27; Great Northwest Fire Station	Upload image	7560 Smokey Row Road	In use	
28	1981–present	Station 28; Steltzer Ridge Fire Station	Upload image	3240 McCutcheon Road	In use	
29	1984–present	Station 29; Little Turtle Fire Station	Upload image	5151 Little Turtle Way	In use	
30	1988–present	Station 30; Wyandotte Fire Station		3555 Fishinger Blvd	In use	
31	1988–present	Station 31; Bolton Field Fire Station	Upload image	5303 Alkire Road	In use	
32	1991–present	Station 32; Refugee Tract Fire Station	Upload image	3675 Gender Road	In use	
33	1981–present	Station 33; County Line Fire Station	Upload image	440 Lazelle Road	In use	
34	2003–present	Station 34; Sleepy Hollow Fire Station	Upload image	5201 Wilcox Road	In use	
35	2020–present	Station 35	Upload image	711 Waggoner Road	In use	
36	2026–present	Station 36	Upload image	5785 Central College Rd	In Use	
