= Engine House No. 5 (Columbus, Ohio) =

Former fire station in Columbus, Ohio

- U.S. Historic district – Contributing property
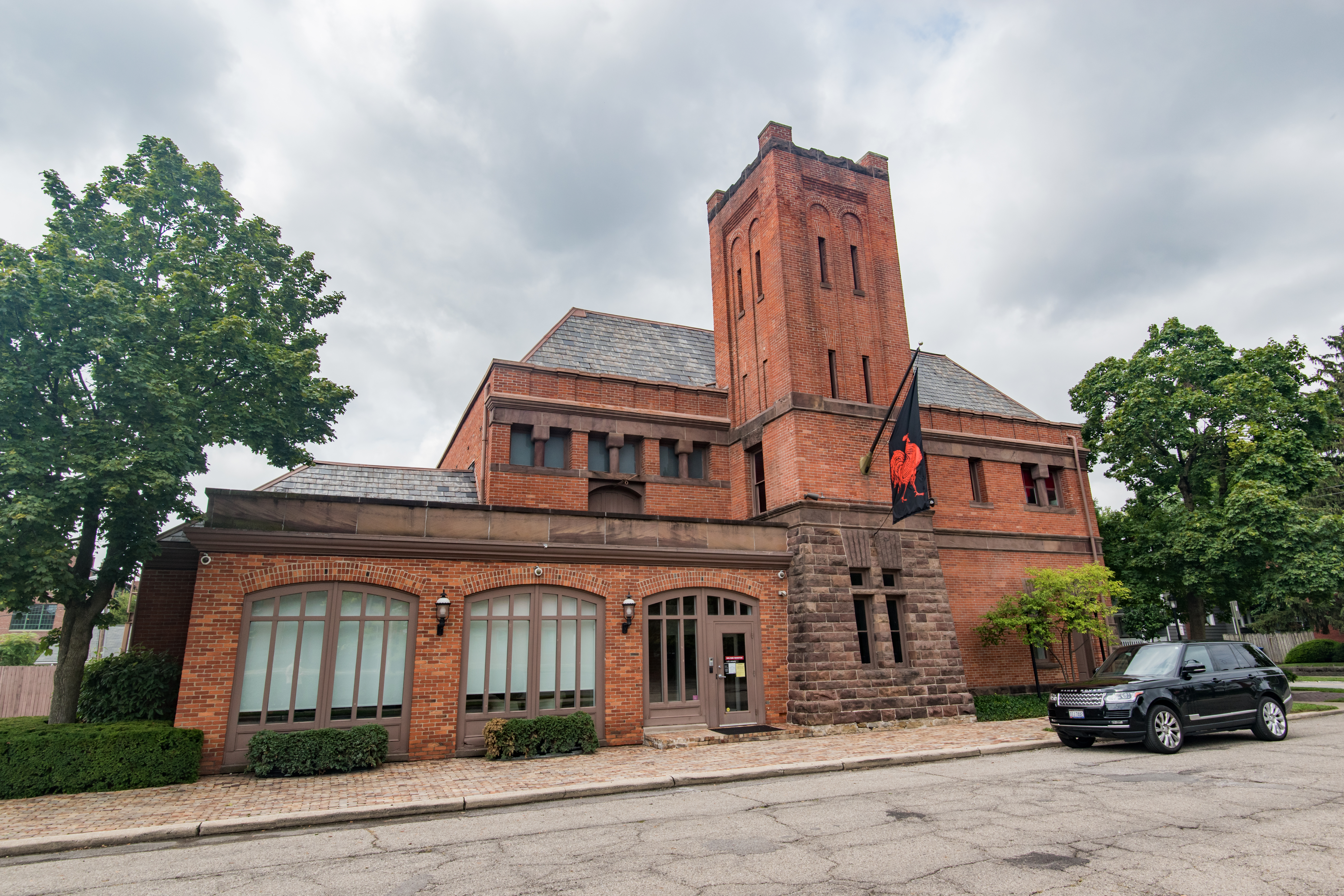
- Interactive map highlighting the building's location
- Location: 121 Thurman Avenue, Columbus, Ohio
- Coordinates: 39.9395°N 82.9929°W
- Built: 1894
- Architect: John Flynn
- Architectural style: Richardsonian Romanesque
- Part of: German Village (ID74001490)

Engine House No. 5 is a former Columbus Fire Department station in the German Village neighborhood of Columbus, Ohio. The building was constructed in 1894, designed in the Richardsonian Romanesque style by John Flynn. The station was decommissioned in 1968. From 1974 to 2002, the space was used for a restaurant and bar, also known as Engine House No. 5. In 2004, the building was converted for office use, and today is the Columbus branch of Big Red Rooster, a marketing company.

The station is one of two remaining Columbus fire stations designed by Flynn, and one of seven 1890s fire stations remaining in the city. It is a contributing part of the German Village Historic District, listed as a Columbus city historic district in 1960 and added to the National Register of Historic Places in 1974.

== Attributes ==
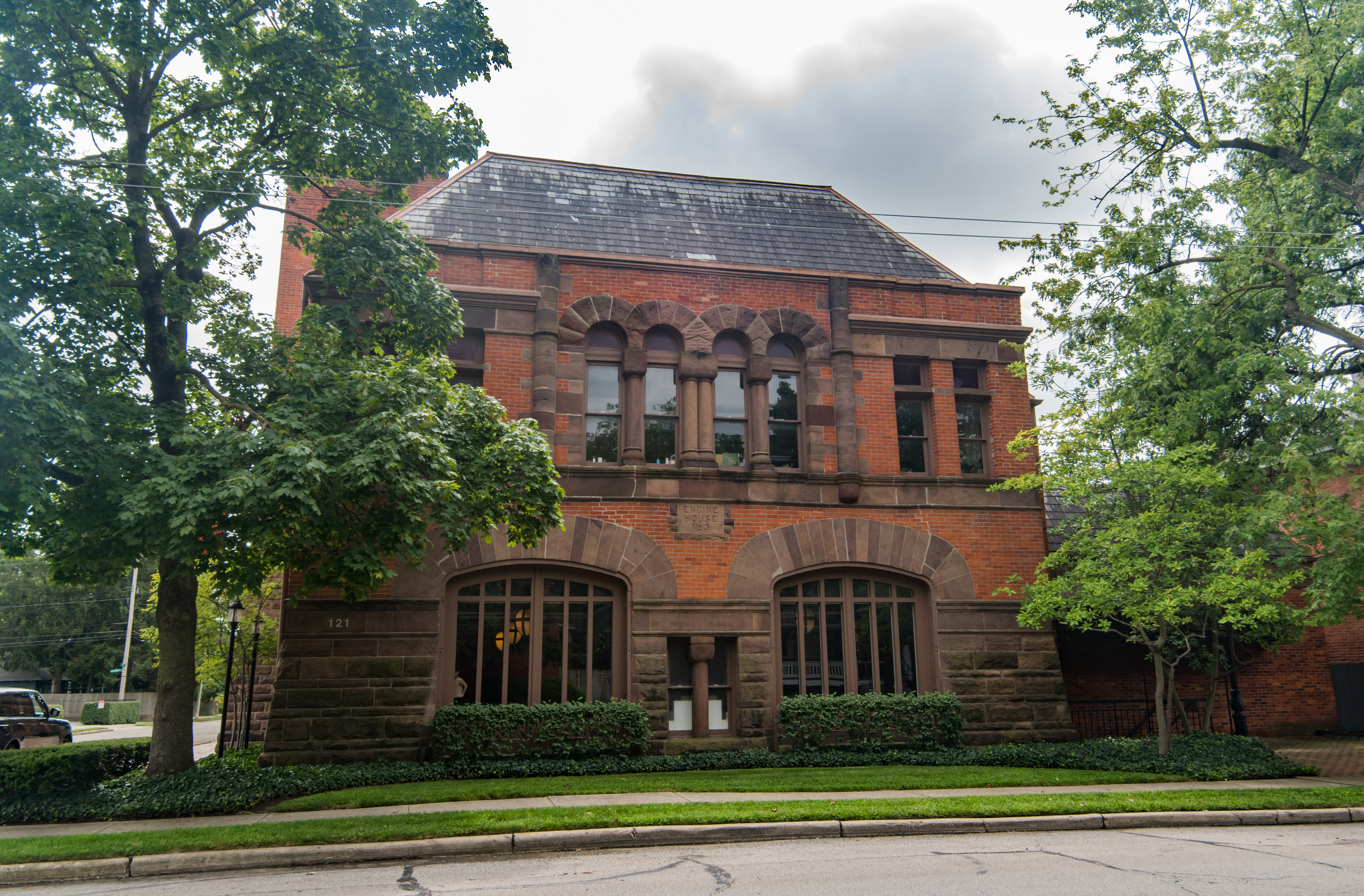
Thurman Avenue elevation

The firehouse was designed in the Richardsonian Romanesque style by John Flynn. It primarily utilizes brick and stone, with a heavy rusticated stone base, large segmental-arched windows, and rusticated stone surrounds. The upper floor of the main facade features a row of thin round-arched windows separated by stone columns, while the former firehouse doorways on the lower floor are now filled with bay windows. The engine house's hose tower still stands, though shortened to three stories.

The fire station was built to house eight firefighters, four horses, a steam engine, and a hose wagon. This included stalls for horses as well as a hayloft for storing fodder. During its operation as a restaurant, the main dining room was located in the former fire engine space. The space was painted peach and muted green; its walls were tastefully decorated with fire memorabilia, largely from the Central Ohio Fire Museum.

Interior decor today includes contemporary office furniture, original fixtures (including a clock, egg-shaped pendant lamps, and slate floors), as well as several pieces on loan from the Central Ohio Fire Museum, including a red emergency call box. The building still holds its original fire pole.

== History ==
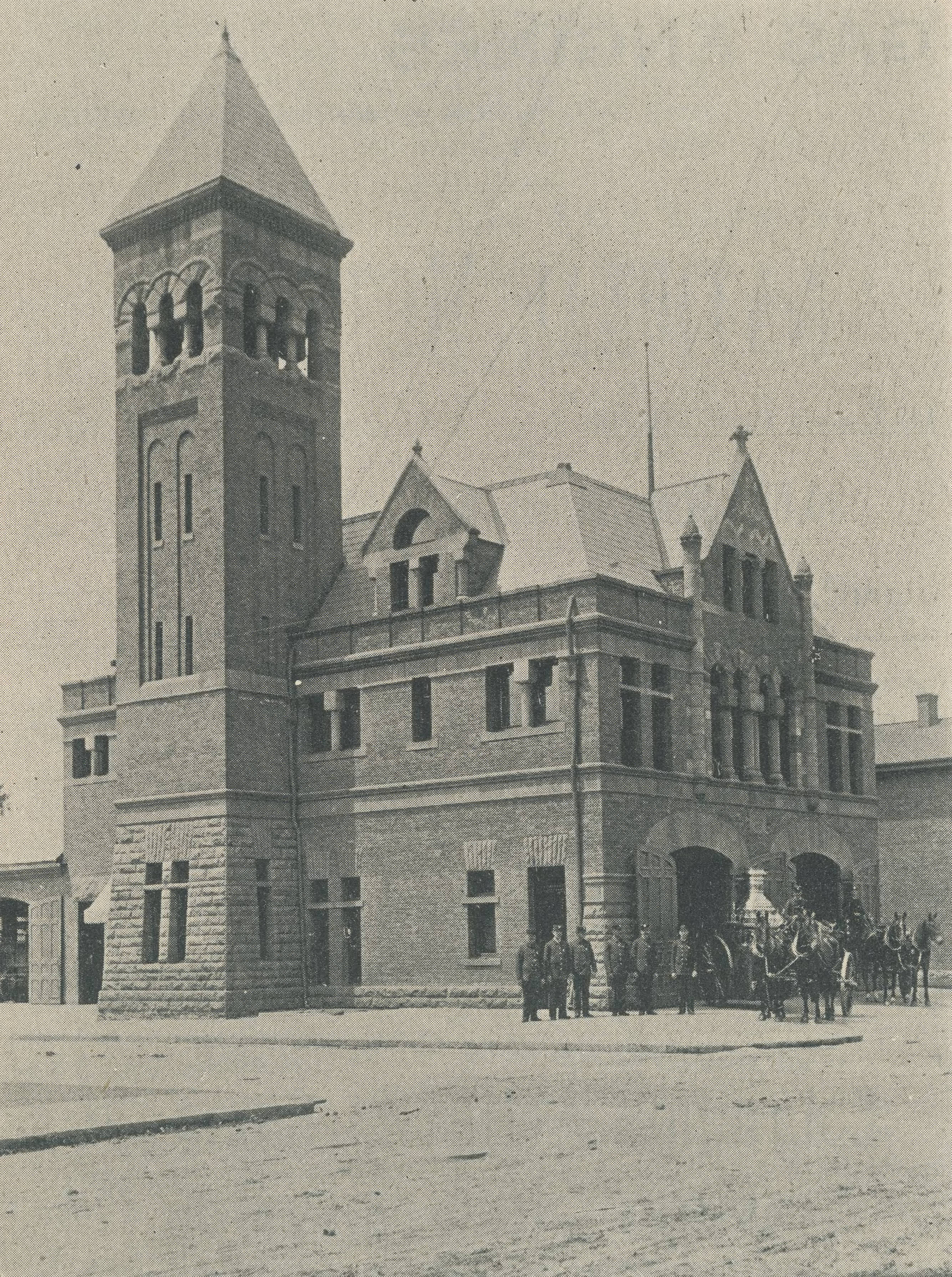
The station c. 1894

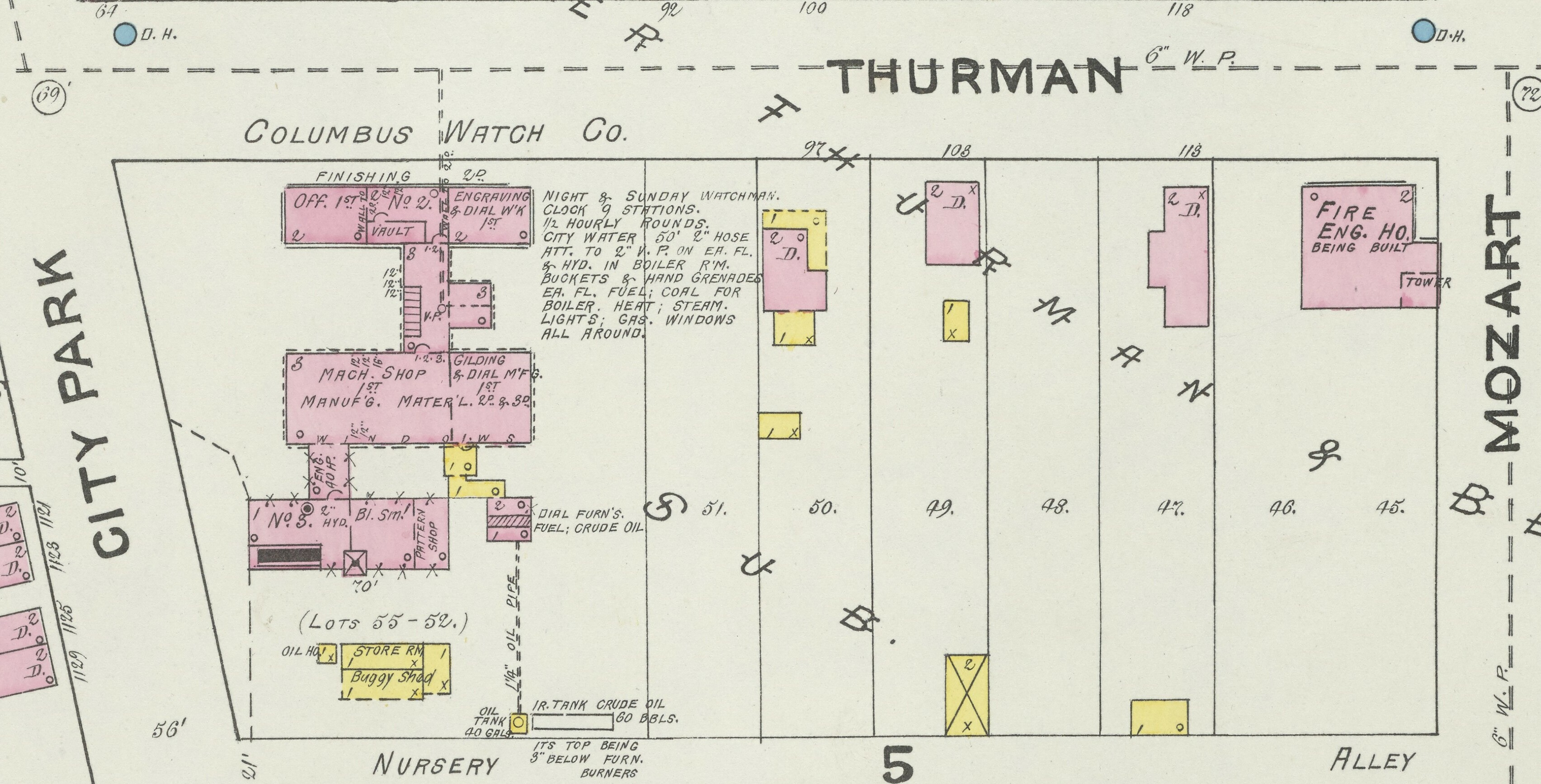
Map of the fire station being built, 1891

Engine House No. 5 was constructed in 1894 to serve as a fire station for the South End, at a time when fire engines were horse-drawn. The station was designed by John Flynn and cost $15,000. It was constructed at a time when fire stations were needed every few blocks. With modernized equipment by the late 1960s, a new fire station was constructed in the area, and so this station was decommissioned in 1968.

The station was listed as a contributing part of the German Village Historic District, a Columbus city historic district, in 1960. It was added to the German Village district on the National Register of Historic Places in 1974.

The building was slated for demolition in 1973, when restaurateur Chuck Muer purchased the building at auction and renovated it at a cost of about $1 million. He opened a seafood restaurant there in 1974, also called Engine House No. 5. The restaurant was quirky, known for its waiters who would surprise guests celebrating their birthday by sliding down its firepole while holding a cake with candles. It also maintained a reputation for quality fresh seafood. Muer's operations also included a bar in the basement of the building called "The Spot", a casual bar known for its strawberry shortcake. The restaurant operated until 2002 even after Muer and his wife disappeared while sailing through a storm in 1993. In 2002, it was purchased by Landry's, a large restaurant group. The group operated the restaurant for two months before permanently closing it.

A renovation in 2004 turned the interior into office space. It is now occupied by a branch of the marketing company Big Red Rooster. The company was founded in 2002 in another historic building in Columbus, a Victorian house, and quickly outgrew its space there. In 2011, Big Red Rooster acquired three local marketing companies, and expanded its office space into a new space called "The Coop".

== Status ==
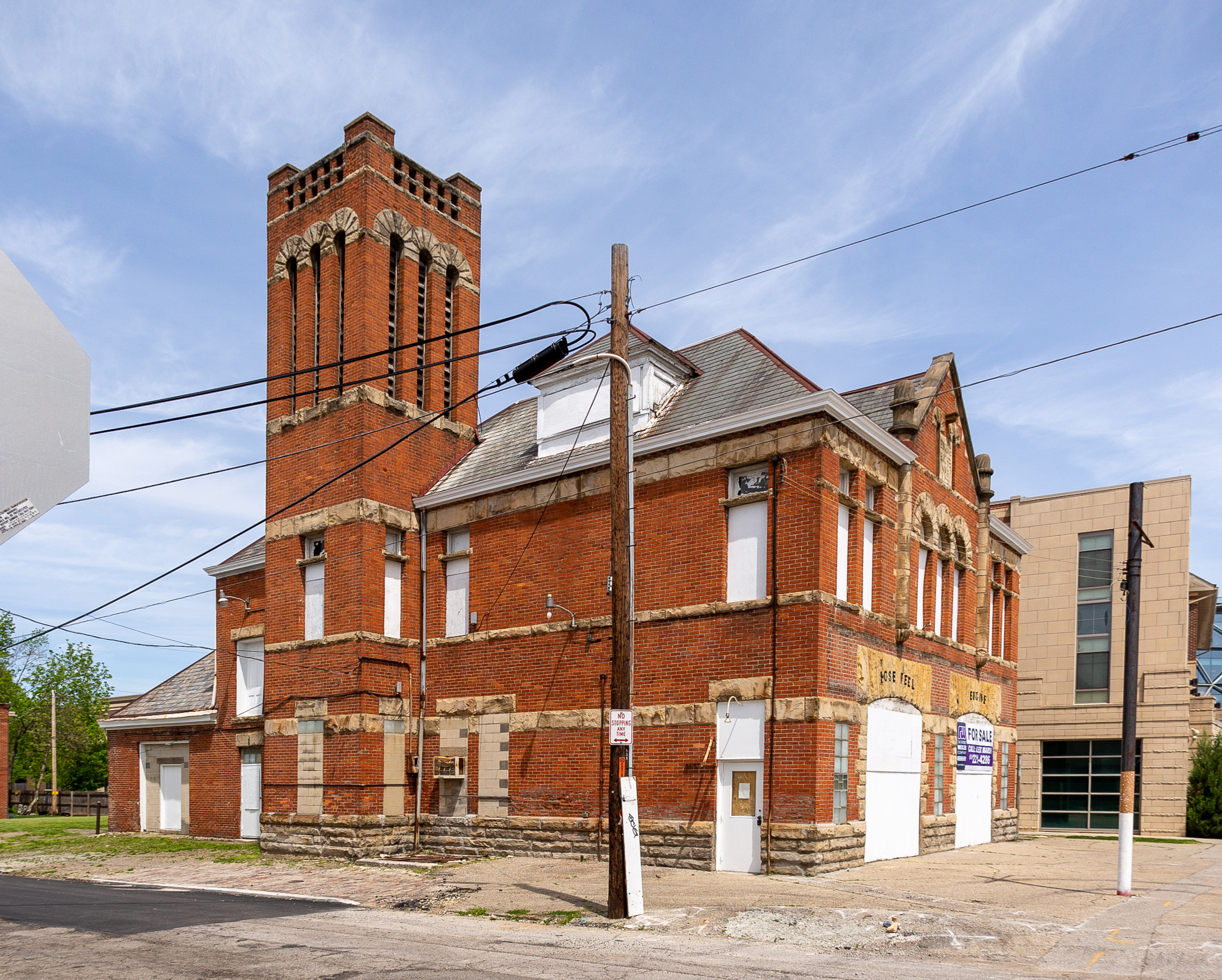
Flynn's Engine House No. 6

The station is one of about twelve built or reconstructed in the city in the 1880s to 1890s. Of these, seven remain, though in various conditions. The other remaining stations in Columbus are:

- Engine House No. 6, built in 1892, at 540 W. Broad Street (also designed by Flynn)
- Engine House No. 7, built in 1888, at 31 Euclid Avenue
- Engine House No. 8, built in 1888, at 283 N. 20th Street
- Engine House No. 10, built in 1897, at 1096 W. Broad Street
- Engine House No. 11, built in 1897, at 1000 E. Main Street
- Engine House No. 12, built in 1897, at 734 Oak Street

== See also ==
- Fire stations in Columbus, Ohio
