= Engine House No. 7 (Columbus, Ohio) =

Former fire station in Columbus, Ohio

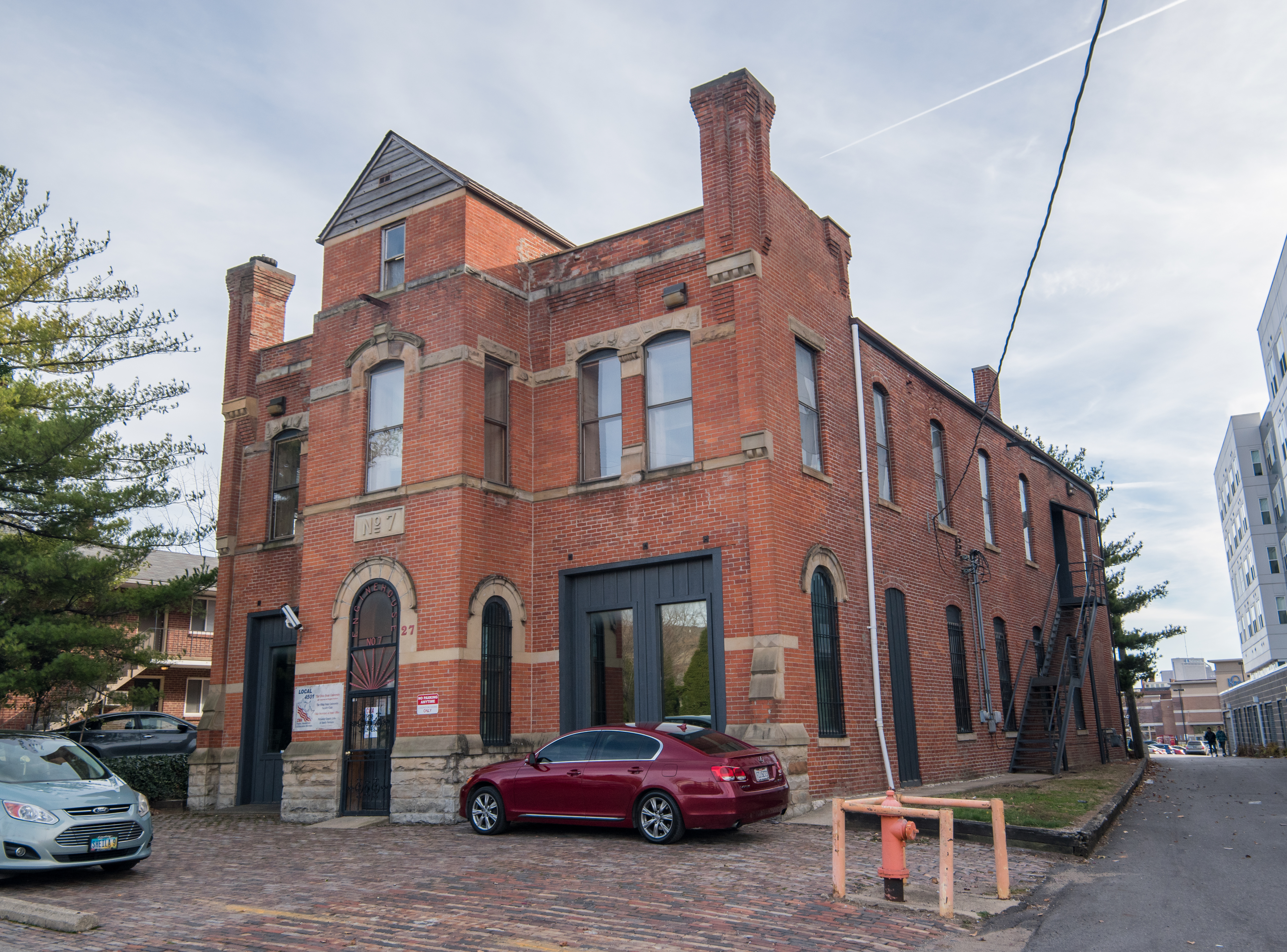
- Location: 27 Euclid Avenue, Columbus, Ohio
- Coordinates: 39.9911°N 83.0055°W
- Built: 1888

Columbus Register of Historic Properties
- Designated: November 8, 1994
- Reference no.: CR-52

Engine House No. 7 is a former Columbus Fire Department station in the Weinland Park neighborhood of Columbus, Ohio. It was built in 1888 and was listed on the Columbus Register of Historic Properties in 1994. Today the building houses a local branch of the Communications Workers of America, Local 4501.

== Attributes ==
The firehouse building is visibly similar to Engine House No. 8, which was put into service on the same day.

== History ==
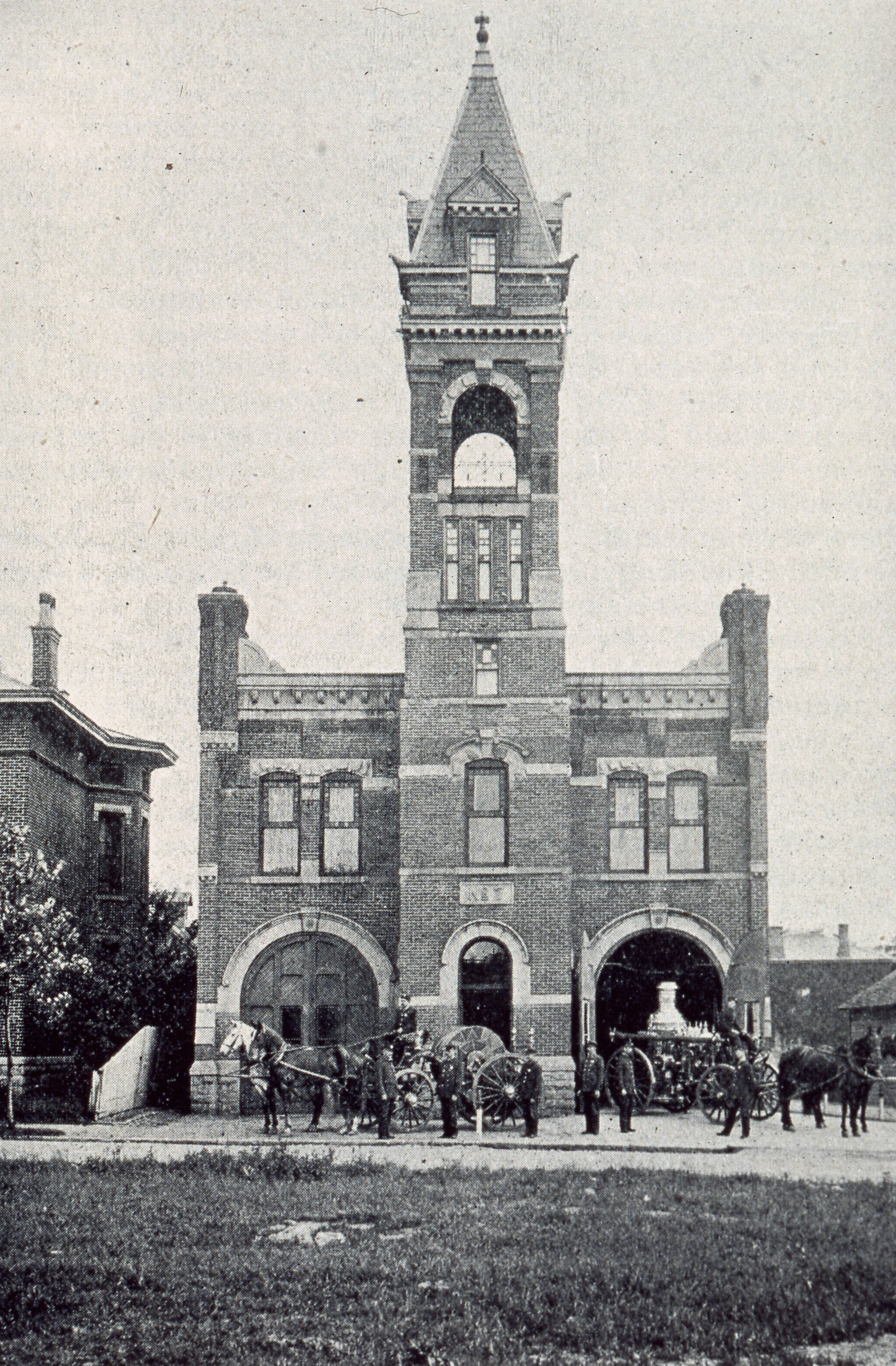
The building in 1894

The engine house was completed in 1888. It and Engine House No. 8 were both put into service on April 9, 1888. Around 1966, the fire department vacated the building, moving to a new facility at 1245 Indianola Avenue. Around 1965, the city began leasing the old building to the owner of a Ford dealership nearby, who began using it for parts storage. The dealership owner purchased the building in 1970.

Around 1980, the former fire station was suggested to house a collection of fire equipment, historical records, and old fire engines, and become the city's first firefighting museum. The former Engine House No. 1 instead came to house these items, as the Central Ohio Fire Museum.

In 1982, a new owner, a local developer, submitted plans to restore and rehabilitate the building while turning it into a hardware store. The owner also expressed a desire to eventually house a restaurant there.

The building has housed a local branch of the Communications Workers of America, Local 4501, for decades. In August 1994, the labor union nominated the building to the Columbus Register of Historic Properties, and it was approved and listed in November of that year.

== Status ==
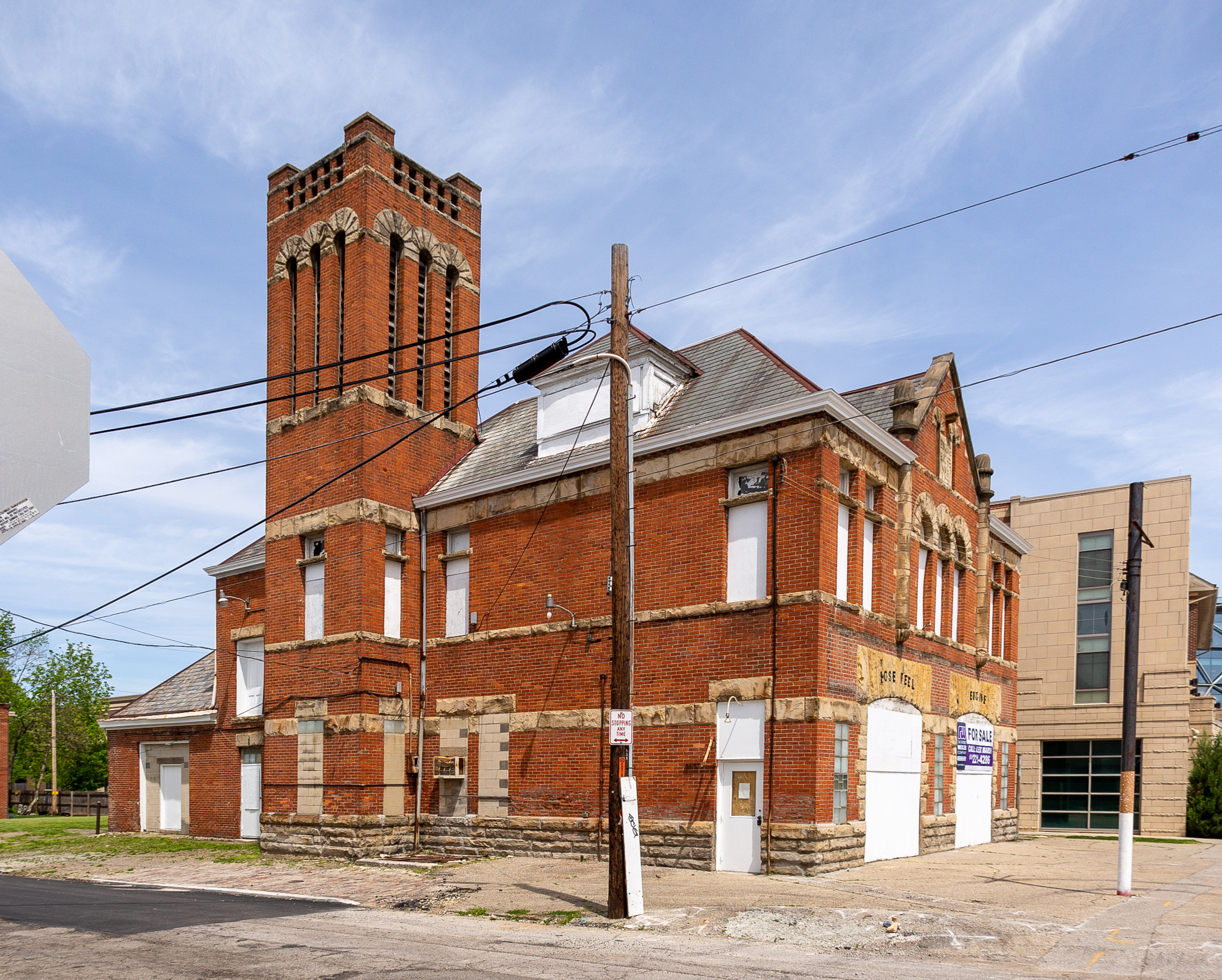
Engine House No. 6

The station is one of about twelve built or reconstructed in the city in the 1880s to 1890s. Of these, seven remain, though in various conditions. The other remaining stations in Columbus are:

- Engine House No. 5, built in 1894, at 121 Thurman Avenue
- Engine House No. 6, built in 1892, at 540 W. Broad Street
- Engine House No. 8, built in 1888, at 283 N. 20th Street
- Engine House No. 10, built in 1897, at 1096 W. Broad Street
- Engine House No. 11, built in 1897, at 1000 E. Main Street
- Engine House No. 12, built in 1897, at 734 Oak Street

== See also ==
- Fire stations in Columbus, Ohio
