= Engine House No. 10 (Columbus, Ohio) =

Former fire station in Columbus, Ohio

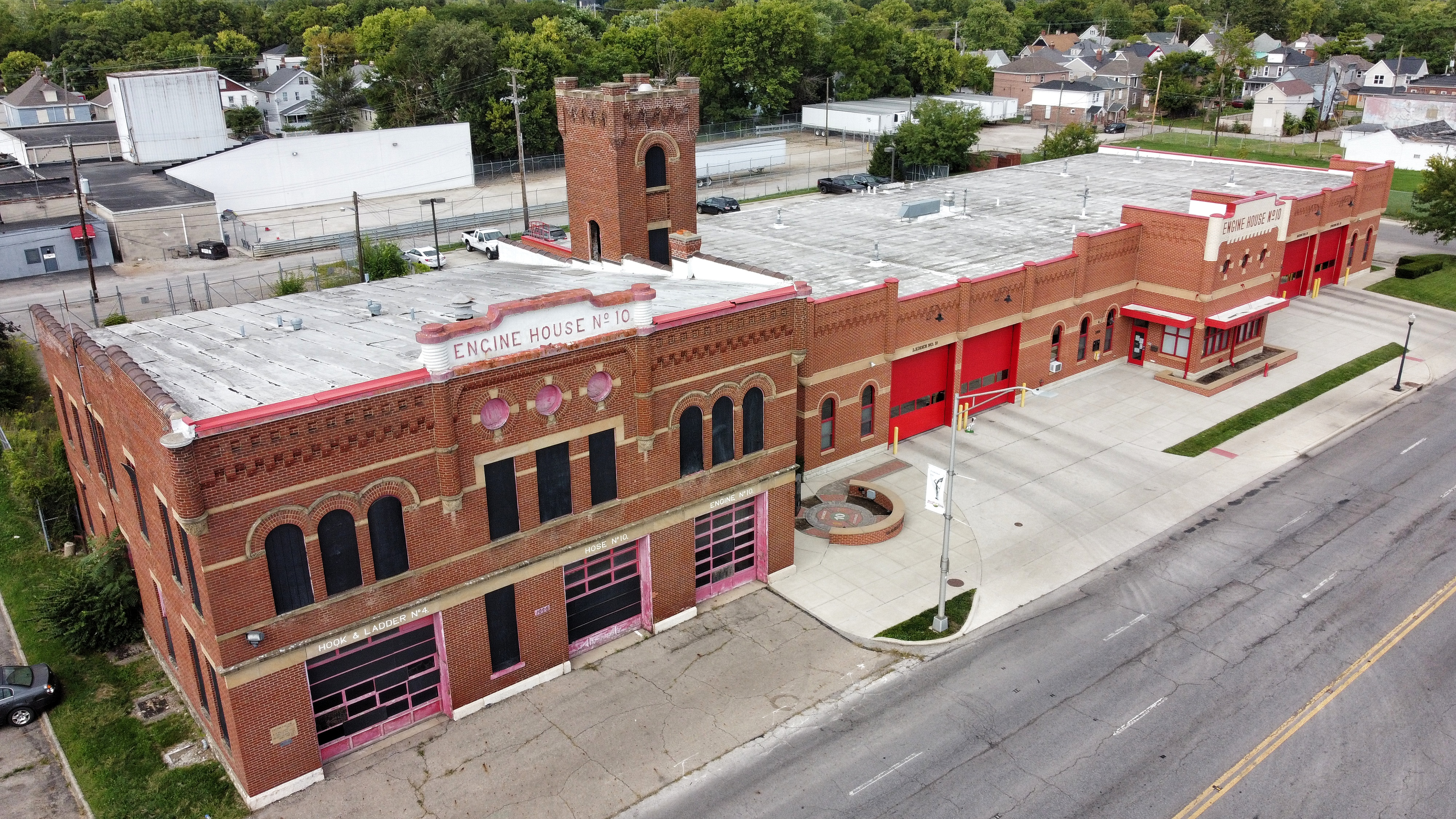
- The former (left) and current (right) Engine House No. 10
- Location: 1080 and 1096 W. Broad Street, Columbus, Ohio
- Coordinates: 39.959008°N 83.029248°W
- Built: 1897; 2008

Engine House No. 10 is a Columbus Division of Fire station in the Franklinton neighborhood of Columbus, Ohio. The original firehouse was built in 1897, while its neighboring replacement, also known as Station 10, was completed in 2008.

== History ==
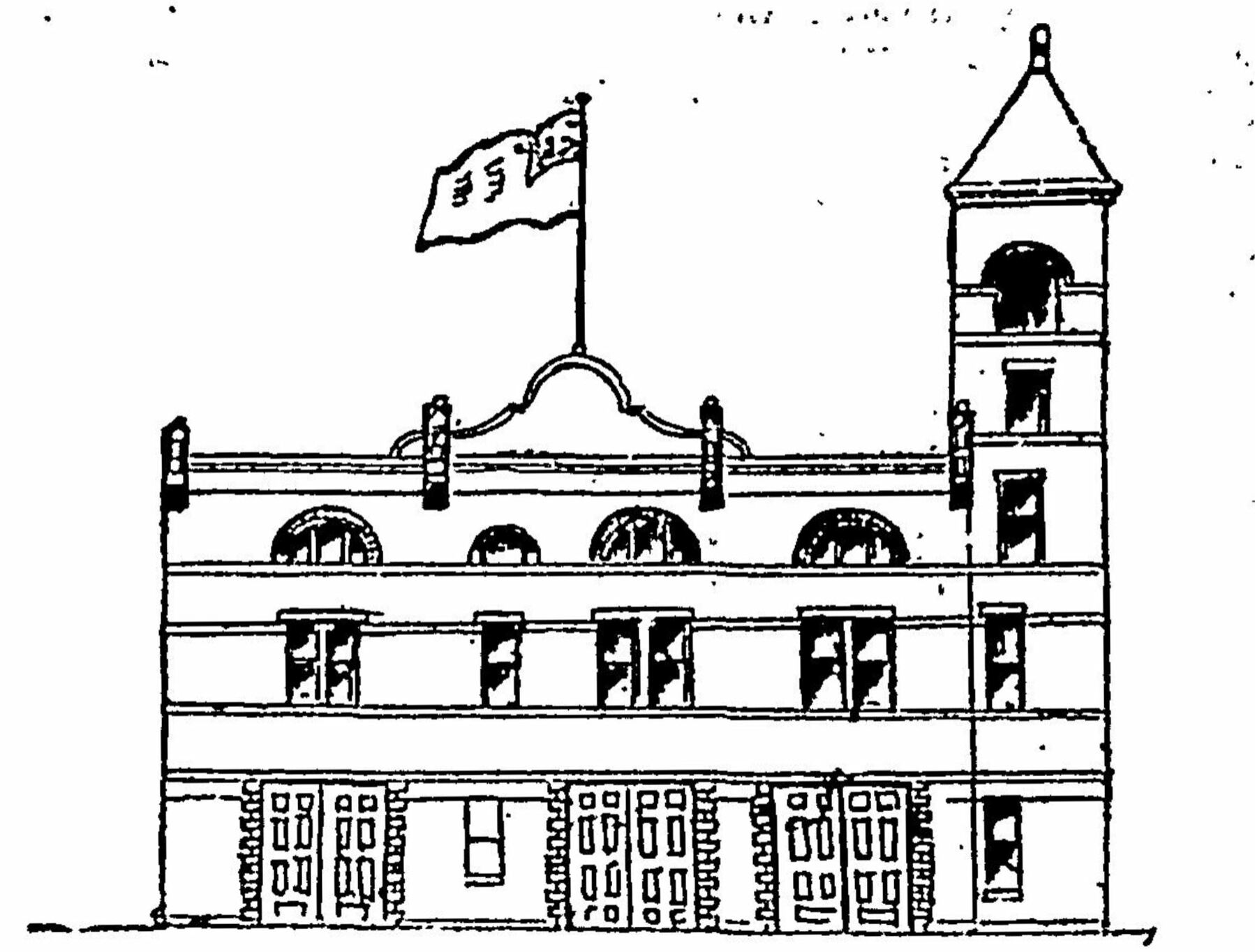
Initial design for the east and west side engine houses in 1896

The West Broad Street engine house was designed in 1896, to be identical in interior and exterior design to the original Engine House No. 11 on East Main Street. Both were locations on the National Road. The station was built from August 1896 to February 1897 at a cost of $22,140. A flood in late 1896, during the station's construction, showed the station's basement to be "practically useless". The flooding forced workers to shut a sewer valve, leading surface water to drain into the basement, accumulating several feet. Suggestions were made for remedying the problem. In 1912, the station became the second in Columbus equipped with a full complement of motorized vehicles. In the fallout of the Great Flood of 1913, the fire station's cellar again flooded, and one of the department's fire engines was used to pump out water, sand, and small debris.

The station building housed the department's training academy from 1952 to 1962. In 1971, the station caught on fire, caused by a gas stove. On January 15, 1976, another fire broke out, in the second-story storage and exercise room, with repair costs estimated at $10,000. During an internal investigation of the fire, officials attempted to force 14 firefighters to take lie detector tests. Several of the firefighters sued the city, prompting a judge's injunction against taking the tests. A county judge later gave a permanent injunction from taking the tests, calling them part of a "fishing expedition".

Around 1988, city officials proposed to close the station, along with the Hilltop's Station 17, and build a new larger station between the two. The decision was made to renovate both stations instead, after significant opposition from residents worried about response times.

Around 1996, for the station's centennial, firefighters at Station 10 asked for renovation donations, and repainted the first floor interiors.

In the early 2000s, the city added a ventilation system to the station, as diesel exhaust would cause issues as it rose, especially through space around the fire poles, into the crew's living spaces. The city also upgraded the building's electrical system. Most major repairs in the last two decades were postponed, as the city had been planning to replace the building anyway. The new building had a delayed construction date as the city was waiting for the Franklinton floodwall to be completed; it was eventually finished in 2004.

By 2001, the building was degrading, with toxic fumes, rotten and boarded-up windowframes, and suspected asbestos and lead paint. The foundation had been X-rayed eight years prior, showing crumbling basement walls. Boiler problems, faulty thermostats, and three fires had affected the building. In 2003, temporary lighting was placed to light the first floor, replacing faulty circuitry; a permanent fix was estimated at $60,000.

In 2005, Columbus City Council was to designate the 1897 firehouse for listing on the Columbus Register of Historic Properties, along with three other historic fire stations. The action was tabled indefinitely.

In 2006, amid plans to construct a new firehouse, most of the firefighters at Engine House 10 expressed unwillingness to leave. In 2008, the fire station transferred to its new building, built adjacent to the original firehouse. By the time of the original firehouse's closure (and since at least 1987), it was the oldest active fire station in Columbus. The 1897 building still stands. In 2008, a memorial for Maurice Gates was installed between the old and new firehouses. Gates was a firefighter at the station and Franklinton resident who died in the line of duty at the age of 21, in 1982.

The Columbus Landmarks Foundation listed the old Engine House No. 10 as an endangered site in June 2023, in the 2023 edition of its Most Endangered List.

== Attributes and design ==
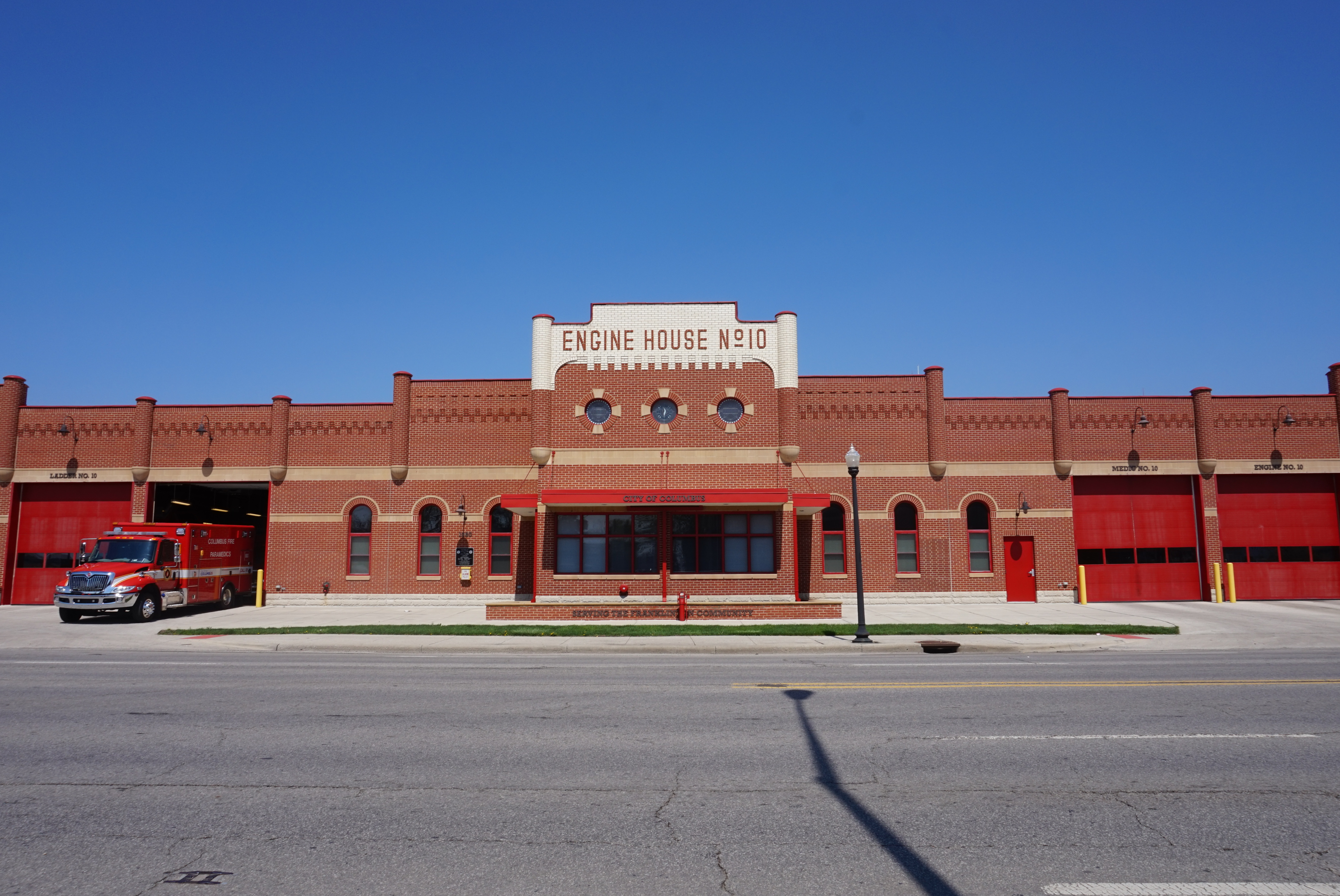
Broad St. facade of the new fire station

Station 10 is also known as the "Maurice Gates Firehouse", and colloquially as "Tens" as it houses Engine 10, Ladder 10, and Medic 10. Its firefighters are nicknamed the "River Rats", as most Columbus fire stations have nicknames or mascots. The river rat theme alludes to the many floods, including the Great Flood of 1913, that plagued the area until a floodwall was constructed between Franklinton and the nearby Scioto River.

The new station building was designed by Harris Architects, built to complement the neighboring station building. It has four bays for emergency vehicles, a commercial kitchen, 18 dormitories for firefighters, classrooms, and recreation and training areas.

Today, the older firehouse has ground-floor exhibits to educate the public on the station's history and community role. Outside the firehouses is a memorial to Maurice Gates, a firefighter from Station 10 who died in the line of duty.

=== 1897 building ===
The two-story 1897 building has two bays for emergency vehicles, just barely wide enough for modern fire engines. It has horse stalls and a hayloft for keeping horses at the engine house, as it was built at a time when the engines were horse-drawn. In the station's later history, the stalls were used to house EMS equipment and the hayloft was used as an exercise room. The three-story hose tower was still in use in the 2000s, used to dry the engine's hoses. A request for electric driers was turned away, given that the station already has the hose tower. The building also has two fireman's poles. The relatively cramped building was seen as a benefit to the firefighters, bringing them closer together. In 2006, station members estimated that the two second-story dormitory rooms (formerly one large room) brought the firefighters together better than the new station's private bedrooms would. At this time, 45 firefighters worked in the station, in three shifts.

Despite its wear, the building was well beloved by the community, referred to in the Columbus Dispatch in 2001 as "possibly [Columbus's] longest-neglected and most-beloved firehouse."

The building is visibly similar to Engine House No. 11, which was designed and built at the same time. Both have two stories, use brick and stone, with a hose tower. The first floors were designed to house a hook and ladder truck, hose wagon, and a steamer, as well as stalls for nine horses, as it was built at a time when the engines were horse-drawn. The second floors were to house dormitories, the captain's rooms, bathrooms, lockers, a recreation room, and hay lofts.

== Operation ==
The station is part of the fire department's Battalion 5, one of five stations in the battalion that serves the city's west side. It is Franklinton's only fire station. The station has three emergency service vehicles: Engine 10, a 2009 Ferrara; Ladder 10, a 2001 Sutphen 95' Platform; and Medic 10, a 2008 Int'l/Horton.

The station receives a high number of service calls, as many of the neighborhood's wood-frame houses are poorly maintained by absentee landlords, and many community residents would reportedly call on the station's medical team like they would a home healthcare service. It also stays active as an informal community center; during the early 2000s, children would visit to use its soda machine or basketball hoops, or to fix a bike tire. Firefighters would spend time outside the bay doors, greeting residents and giving directions to lost drivers.

== Status ==
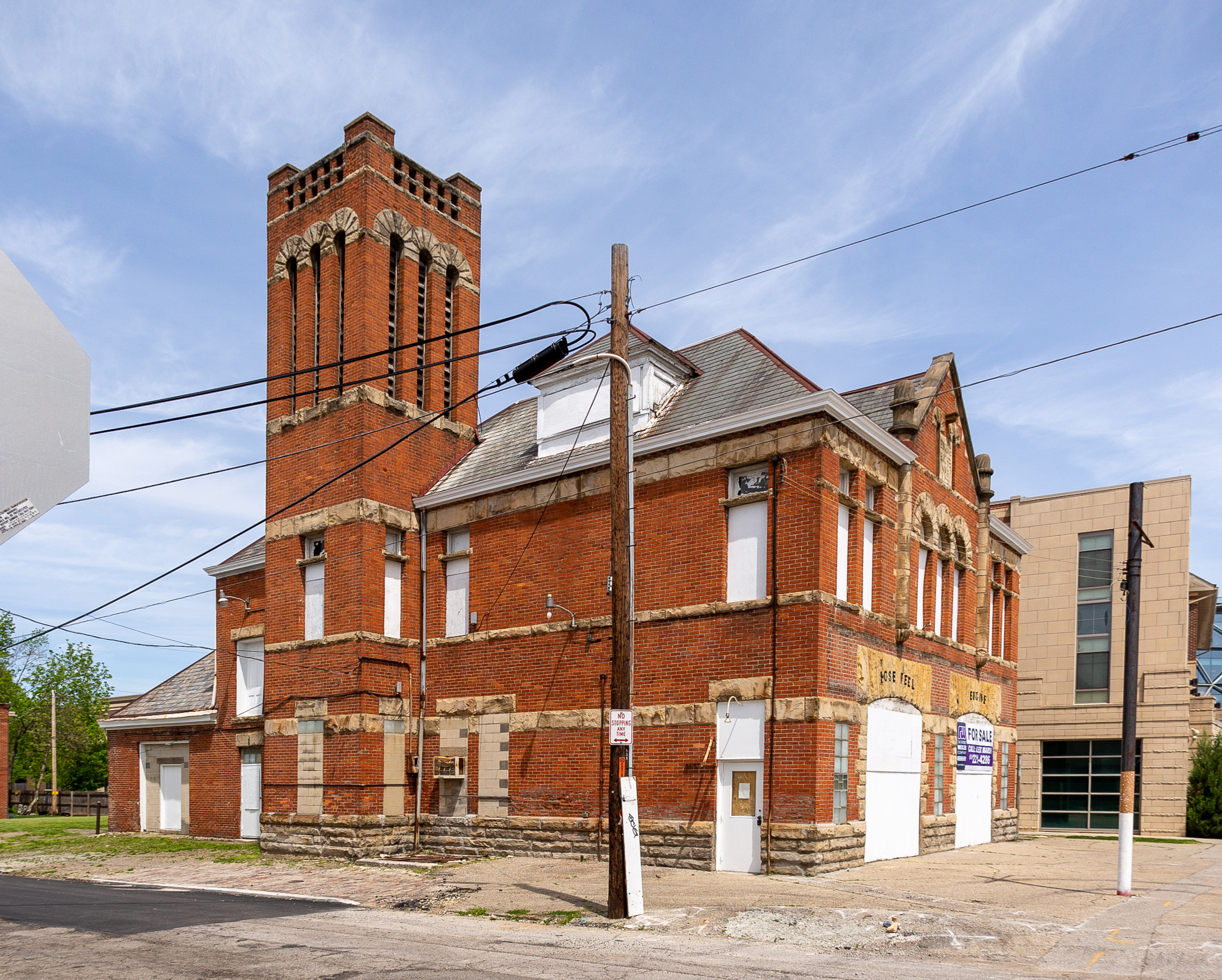
Engine House No. 6

The 1897 station building is one of about twelve built or reconstructed in the city in the 1880s to 1890s, and the last 19th century station operated by the fire department. Of the twelve stations from this period, seven remain, though in various conditions. The other remaining stations in Columbus are:

- Engine House No. 5, built in 1894, at 121 Thurman Avenue
- Engine House No. 6, built in 1982, at 540 W. Broad Street
- Engine House No. 7, built in 1888, at 31 Euclid Avenue
- Engine House No. 8, built in 1888, at 283 N. 20th Street
- Engine House No. 11, built in 1897, at 1000 E. Main Street
- Engine House No. 12, built in 1897, at 734 Oak Street

== See also ==
- Fire stations in Columbus, Ohio
