= Engine House No. 12 (Columbus, Ohio) =

Historic building in Columbus, Ohio

- U.S. Historic district – Contributing property
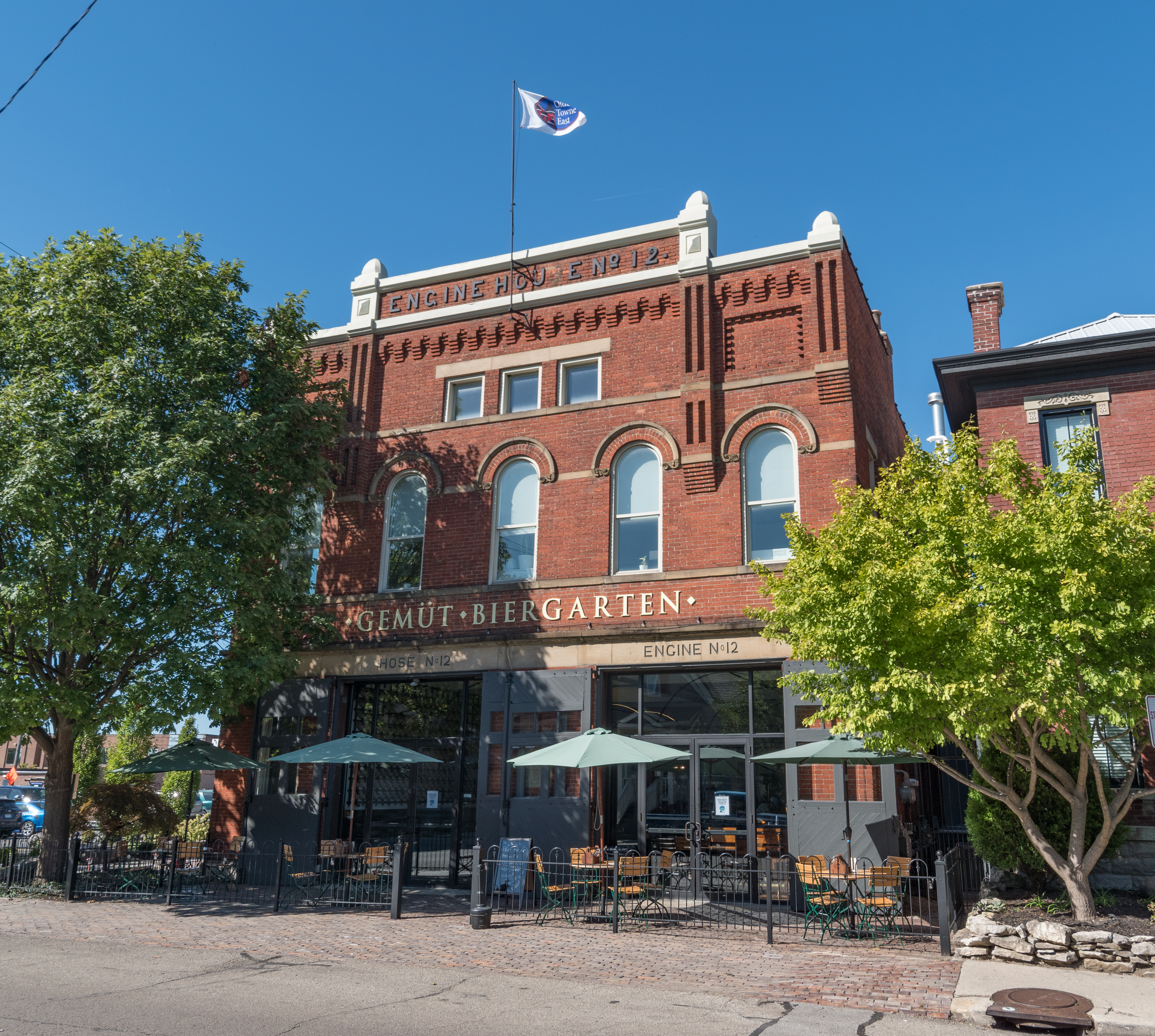
- Interactive map of Engine House No. 12
- Location: 734 Oak St., Columbus, Ohio
- Coordinates: 39.963332°N 82.980844°W
- Built: 1896-1897
- Part of: Columbus Near East Side District (ID78002063)

Engine House No. 12 is a former fire station in the Olde Towne East neighborhood of Columbus, Ohio. Today it primarily houses Gemüt Biergarten, a German restaurant, brewery, and biergarten, with its second story used for offices. It is a contributing property to the Columbus Near East Side District, a national historic district established in 1978.

The building was constructed in 1896 as a Columbus Fire Department station. It became vacant following several decades' use, and subsequently housed the city's Arts and Crafts Center, from 1952 to 1978. The building lay vacant or under renovation for years while several proposals were fielded for it. It finally reopened in 1988 as an event venue and concert space known as the Columbus Music Hall. The music hall operated until 2008, and the building underwent another period of vacancy until another renovation around 2017. Gemüt Biergarten opened in the engine house building in 2019.

== Attributes ==
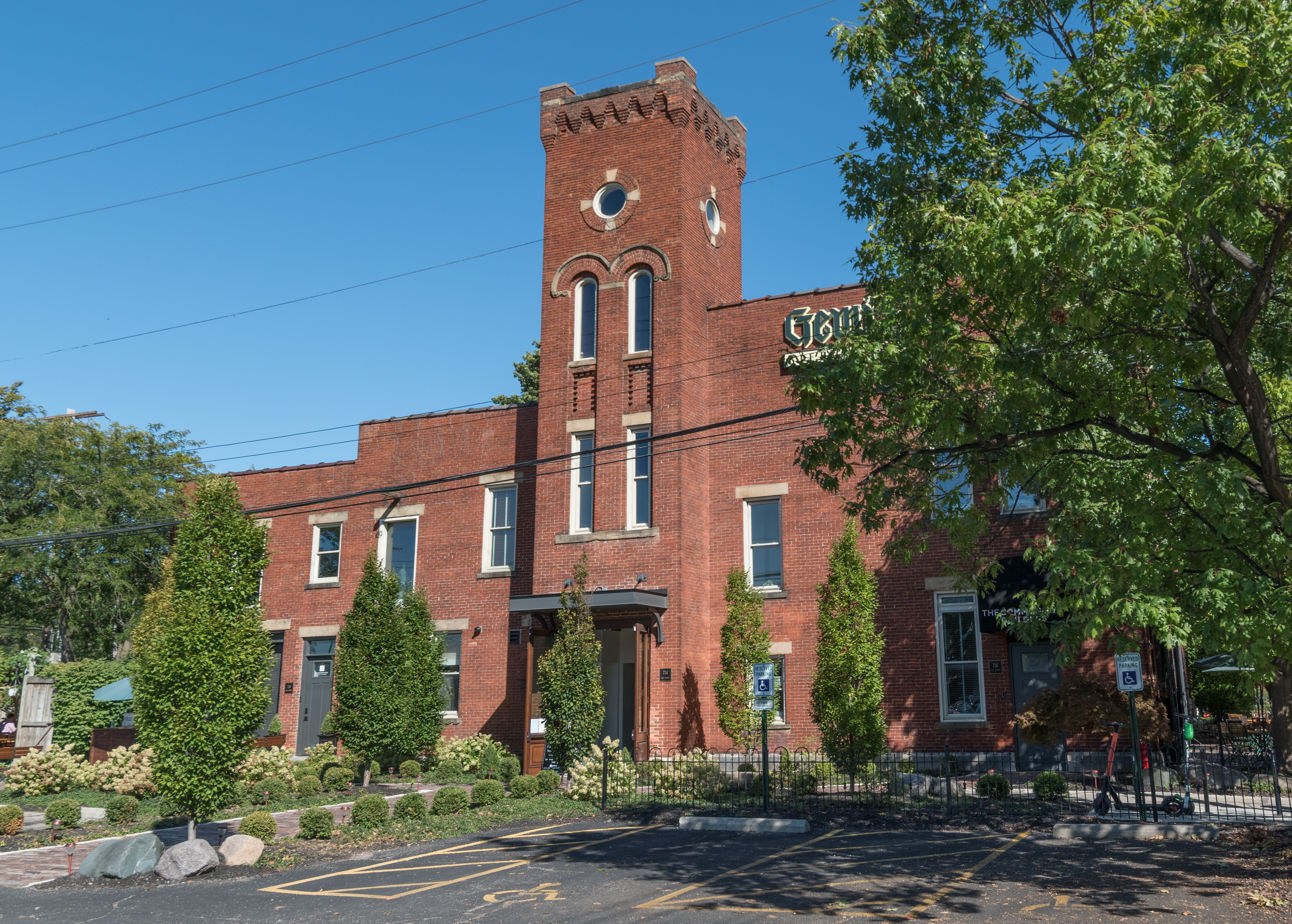
Restaurant entrance at the base of the building's hose tower

The building is made of red brick on a stone foundation, with two stories and 6,000 sq ft (560 m^{2}). It is a contributing property to the Columbus Near East Side District, a national historic district established in 1978.

The building's restaurant occupies a 3,300 sq ft (310 m^{2}) space, including an indoor dining room, beer garden, brewery space, and front and back patios. The dining room has large wooden communal tables. It also features stained glass windows, designed by a London-based artist and created by a Columbus glass studio. The works reflect the stories of the restaurant's house-brewed beers.

== History ==
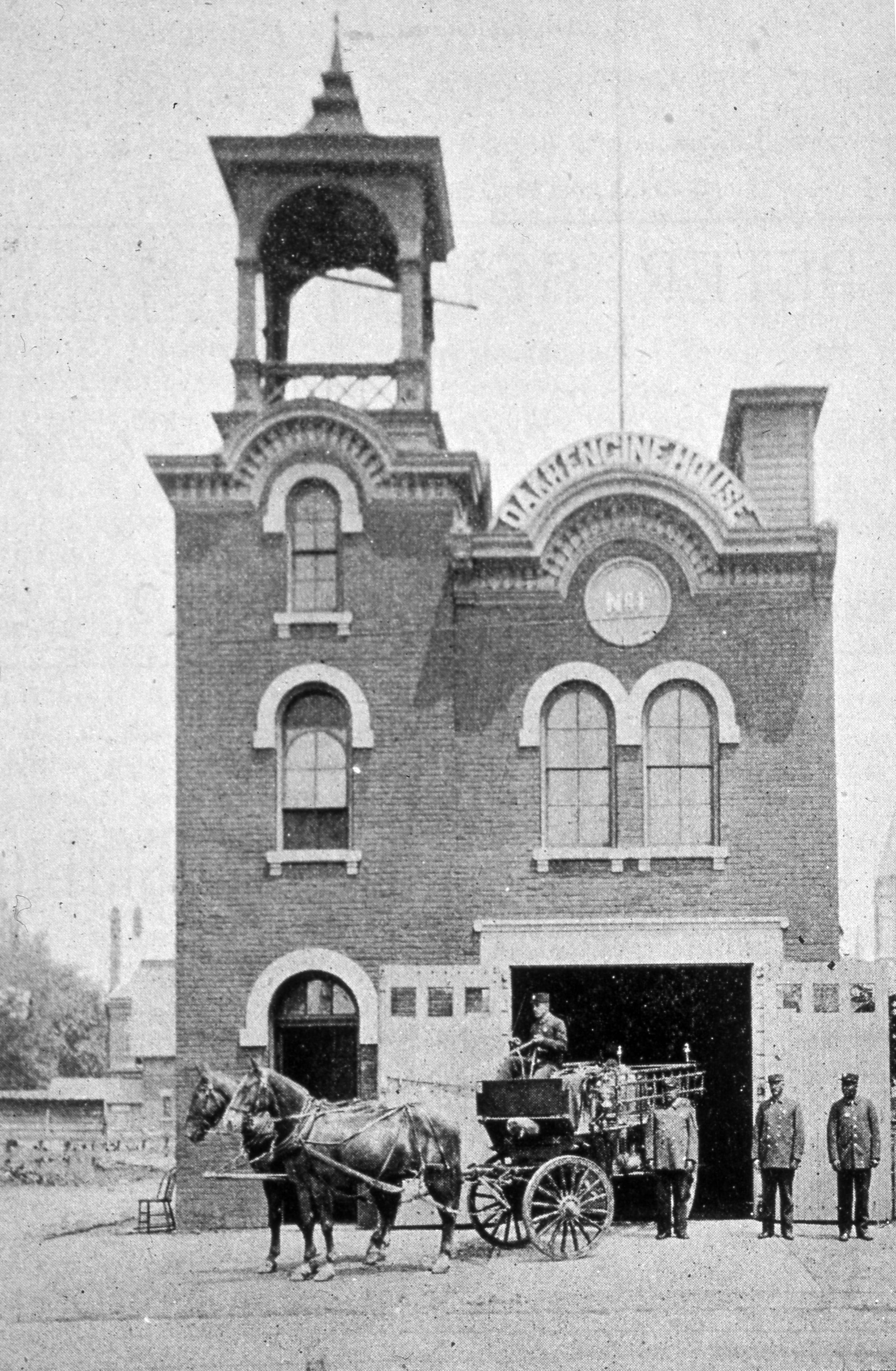
Prior station building, the Oak Street Engine House

The fire station was built from 1896 to 1897, replacing a prior building, the Oak Street Engine House which housed Chemical Engine Company No. 1. The station had been nearly completed in February 1897, including its furniture. The fire station at the time had a requirement to be staffed by people of color, a city ordinance allegedly created to increase minority support for the government. Despite this, the fire chief decided to move the station's existing crew and their chemical engine to a new chemical engine station on West Broad Street, as the equipment needed to be moved and the existing crew was trained and experienced with the machinery. Therefore, in March 1897, the fire department issued a statement that the new station would be staffed by white men. The old fire station was cleared away by April of that year.

The engine house initially operated with horse-drawn fire engines. After the Columbus Fire Department vacated the space, it fell vacant for a long period. In 1952, it became the Arts and Crafts Center of the Columbus Recreation Department. On September 29 of that year, it held its first classes for the community arts and crafts programs. The arts center moved to the new Cultural Arts Center in Downtown Columbus in 1978. In 1980, an architect and restaurateurs attempted to purchase the building and renovate it to house "Fat Tuesday", a New Orleans or Bourbon Street-style French bistro.

In 1985, developer John Ogden purchased the building. Ogden initially planned to convert the building to house a restaurant and other businesses. He received opposition from the Olde Towne East Association and Near East Area Commission, which viewed a lack of parking to support a restaurant on-site. Ogden's plans were then turned down by the Columbus Development Commission. In 1986, Ogden reached a compromise with the community groups, with an agreement not to create a restaurant, and instead have office or retail space on the first floor and apartments on the second. Ogden eventually decided on making the building an event venue, cultural workshop space, and concert space. In 1987, John and Becky Ogden renovated the building into the Columbus Music Hall, which hosted jazz musicians for two decades. Livingston Taylor hosted the opening performance on October 9, 1988. Visitors to the music hall over its history included Ramblin' Jack Elliott, Tom Russell, Jefferson Airplane guitarist-turned-bluesman Jorma Kaukonen, the Woody Herman Orchestra, and the group Dry Branch Fire Squad. It closed in 2008, with a "Farewell to the Firehouse" concert taking place on April 30 that year and a final performance on May 2, 2008. The owner had run out of funds, and cited a lack of substantial income from performances, the building's lack of a full-size kitchen, and its lack of ADA-compliant features barring it from receiving grants.

The building then became vacant again until its purchase by developers in 2017. The development company performed another renovation, including modernizing the space and making repairs to the building's original wooden firehouse doors. A restaurant, Gemüt Biergarten, opened in the building on August 23, 2019. Gemüt Biergarten was positively reviewed by the Columbus Dispatch that year. It praised the food as "impressive", its house-brewed beers, and the "1890s-vintage, refurbished firehouse" with a "convivial beer garden". Though the reviewer had qualms with the counter ordering style and simple food trays, they admitted that in a full-service restaurant, dishes would be smaller and more expensive.

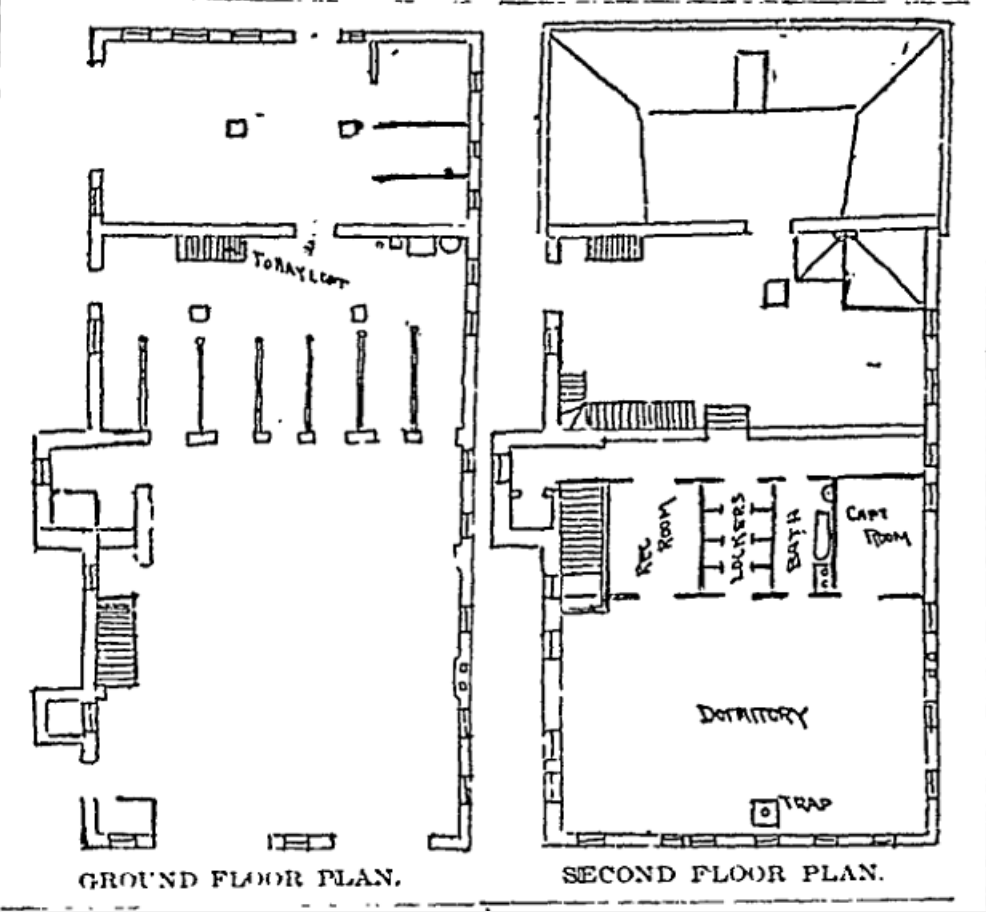
Proposed floorplans, 1896

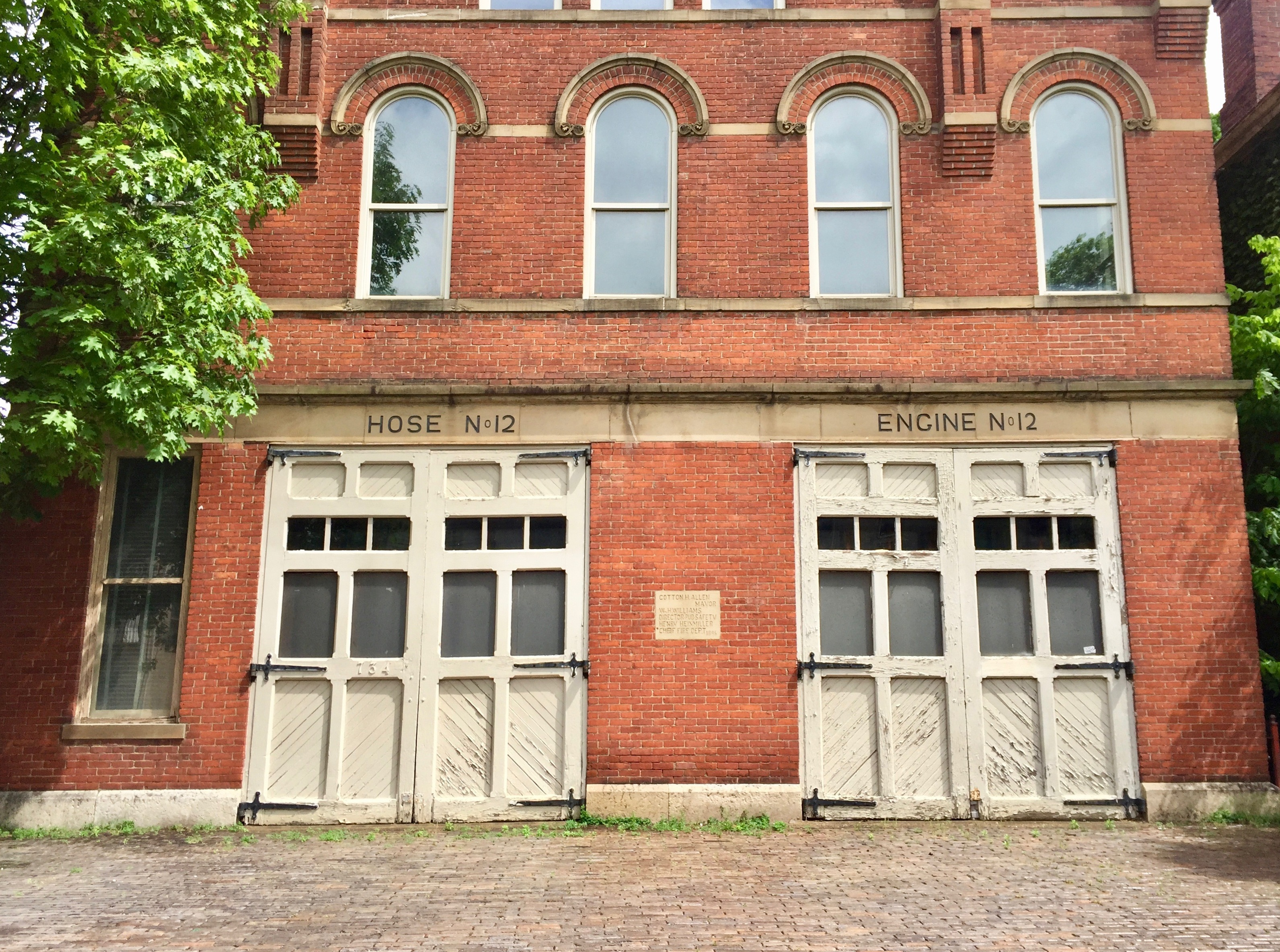
Oak St. façade in 2018

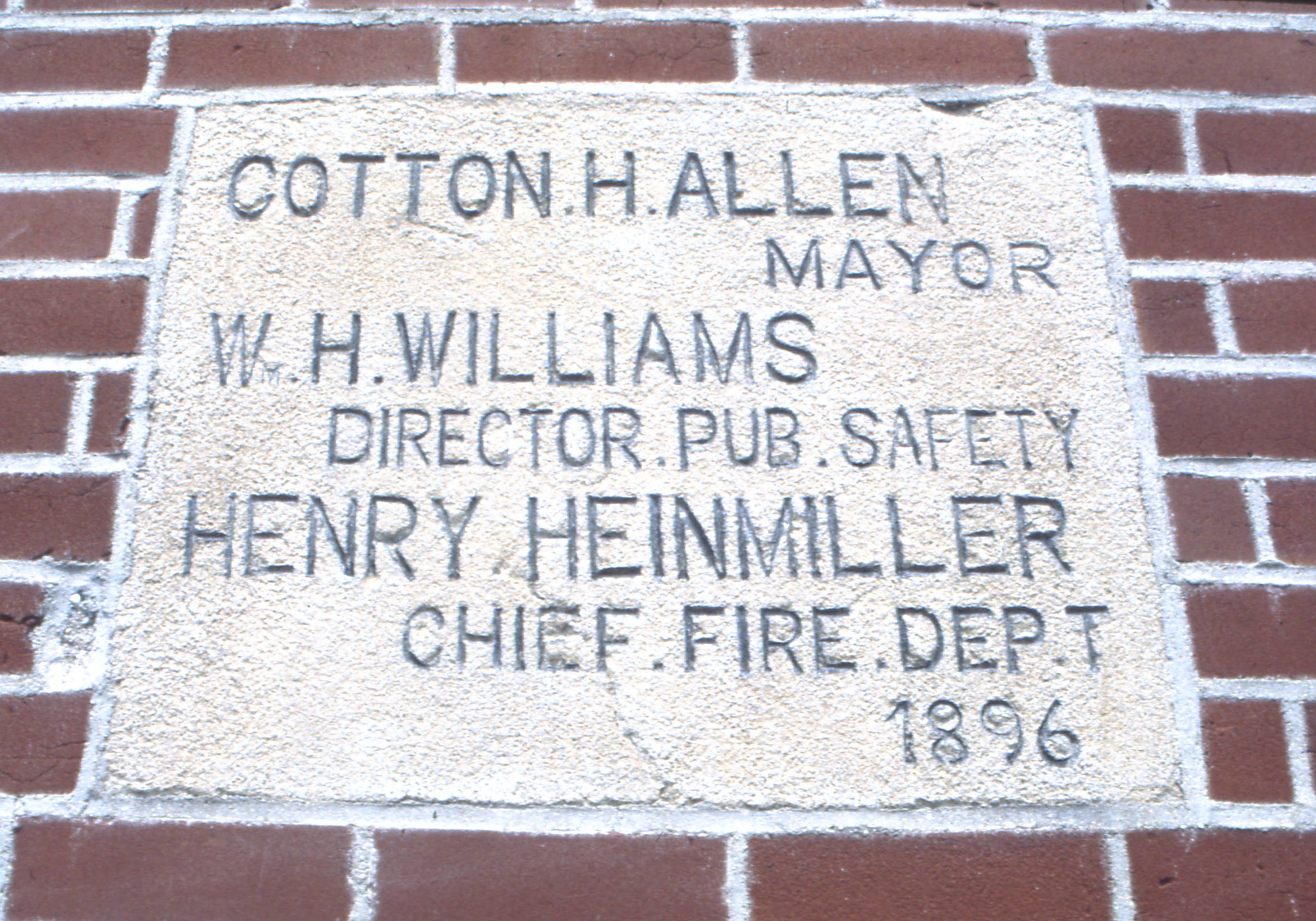
Plaque facing Oak St.

== Status ==
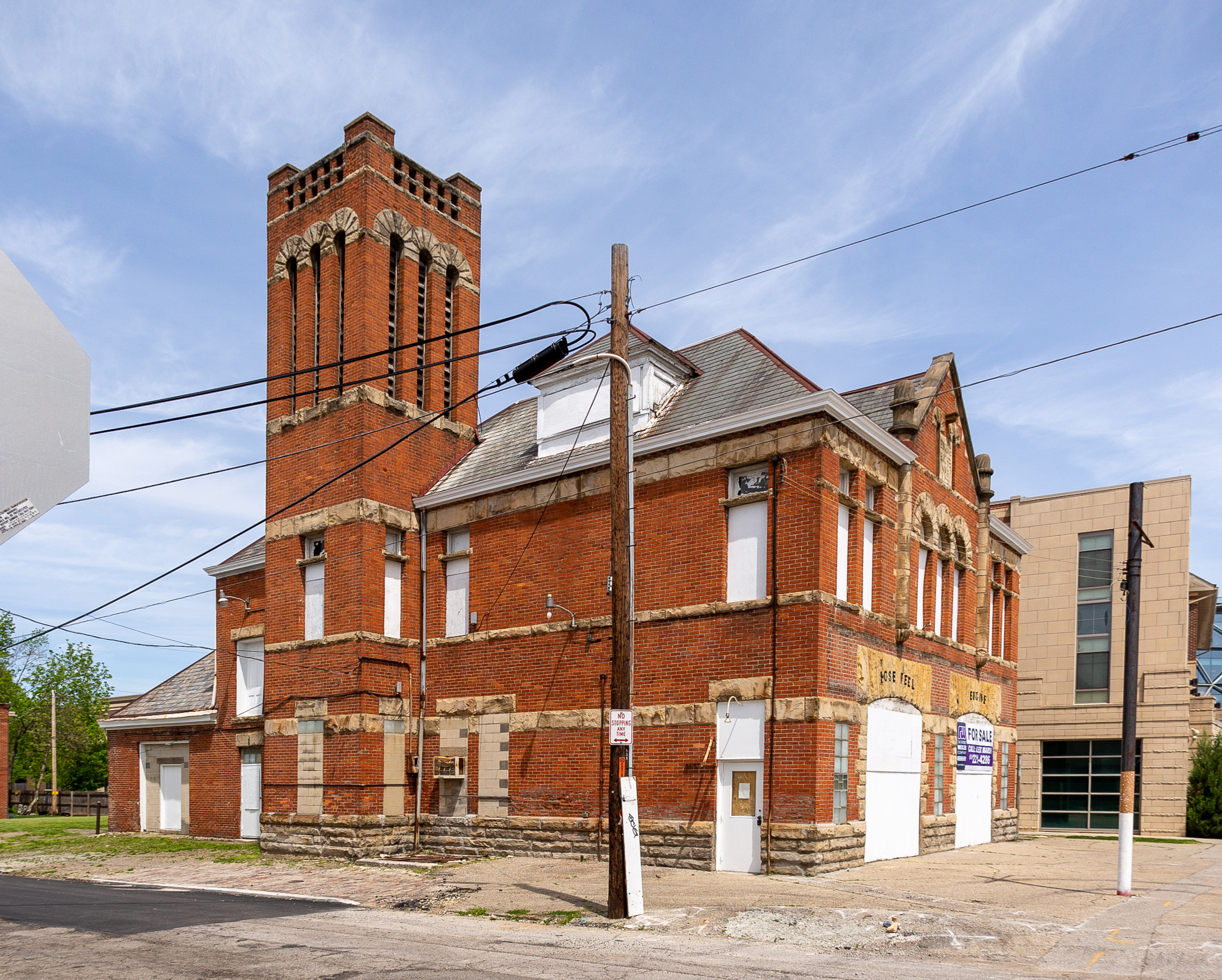
Engine House No. 6

The station is one of about twelve built or reconstructed in the city in the 1880s to 1890s. Of these, seven remain, though in various conditions. The other remaining stations in Columbus are:

- Engine House No. 5, built in 1894, at 121 Thurman Avenue
- Engine House No. 6, built in 1892, at 540 W. Broad Street
- Engine House No. 7, built in 1888, at 31 Euclid Avenue
- Engine House No. 8, built in 1888, at 283 N. 20th Street
- Engine House No. 10, built in 1897, at 1096 W. Broad Street
- Engine House No. 11, built in 1897, at 1000 E. Main Street

== See also ==
- Fire stations in Columbus, Ohio
- National Register of Historic Places listings in Columbus, Ohio
