= Engine House No. 11 (Columbus, Ohio) =

Former fire station in Columbus, Ohio

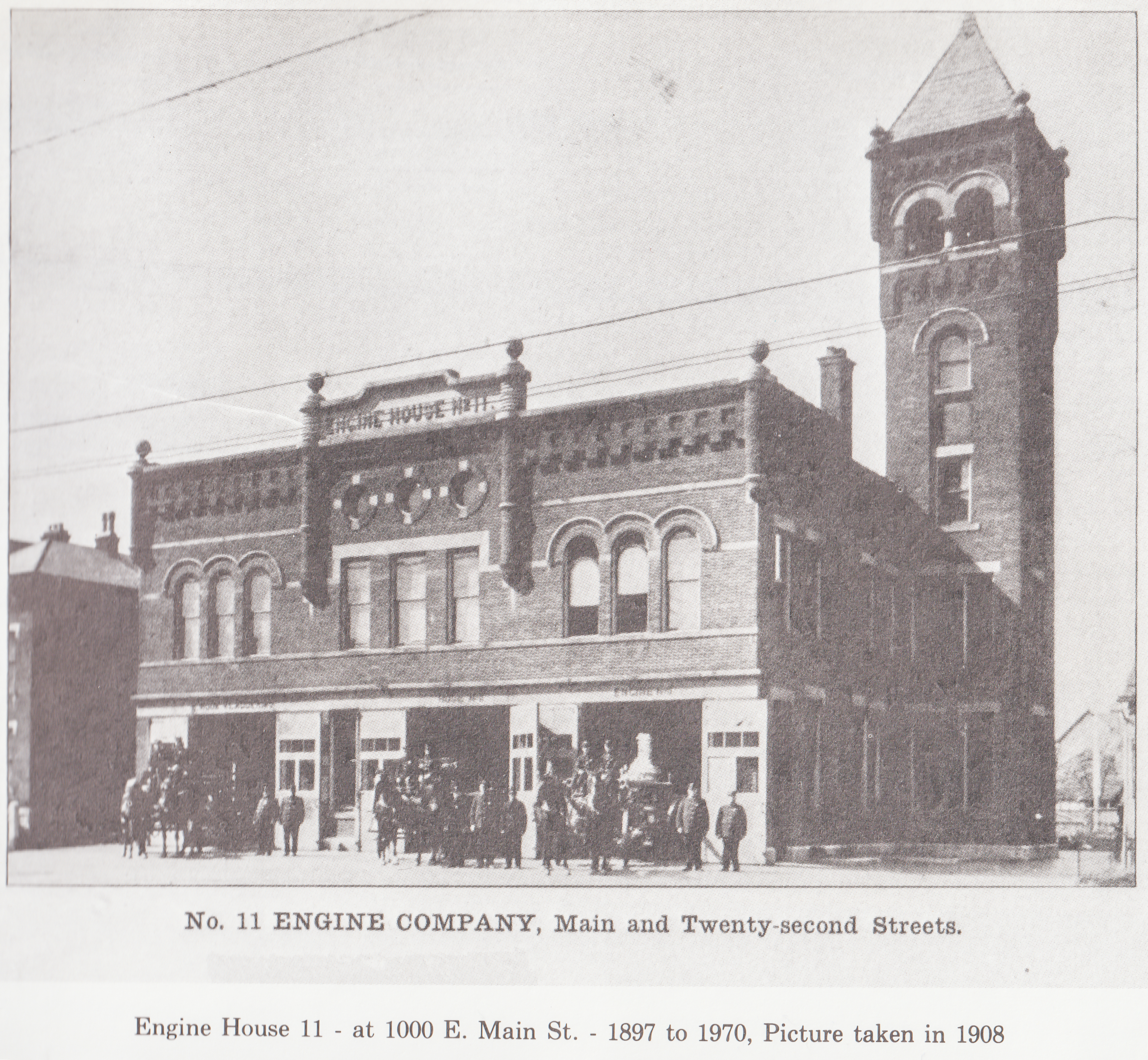
- Interactive map of Engine House No. 11
- Location: 1000 E. Main Street, Columbus, Ohio
- Coordinates: 39.9581°N 82.9727°W
- Built: 1896–1897
- Architectural style: Romanesque Revival

Engine House No. 11, also known as the Main Street Engine House, is a former Columbus Fire Department station in the Olde Towne East neighborhood of Columbus, Ohio. The building was constructed from 1896 to 1897, designed in the Romanesque Revival style. The station was decommissioned in 1970.

== Attributes ==
The fire station was typical of those built in the late 19th century. The building symbolizes the patterns of growth along the National Road, which made East Main Street a commercial corridor with surrounding residential neighborhoods.

When built, the building was reportedly "one of the finest in the city". It measured 59 by 40 feet (18 m × 12 m). Its interior had yellow pine with wainscoting four and a half feet high around the entire room. The floor was of maple, laid on edge with white lead between each strip. The stable had nine oak stalls and a brick floor. The front of the building had three large doors. The engine house was an exact replica of Engine House No. 10, and similar to Engine House No. 12, except that building had no provision for a hook and ladder company. Engine Houses 10 and 11 were designed and built at the same time. Both have two stories, use brick and stone, with a hose tower. The first floors were designed to house a hook and ladder truck, hose wagon, and a steamer, as well as stalls for nine horses, as it was built at a time when the engines were horse-drawn. The second floors were to house dormitories, the captain's rooms, bathrooms, lockers, a recreation room, and hay lofts.

== History ==
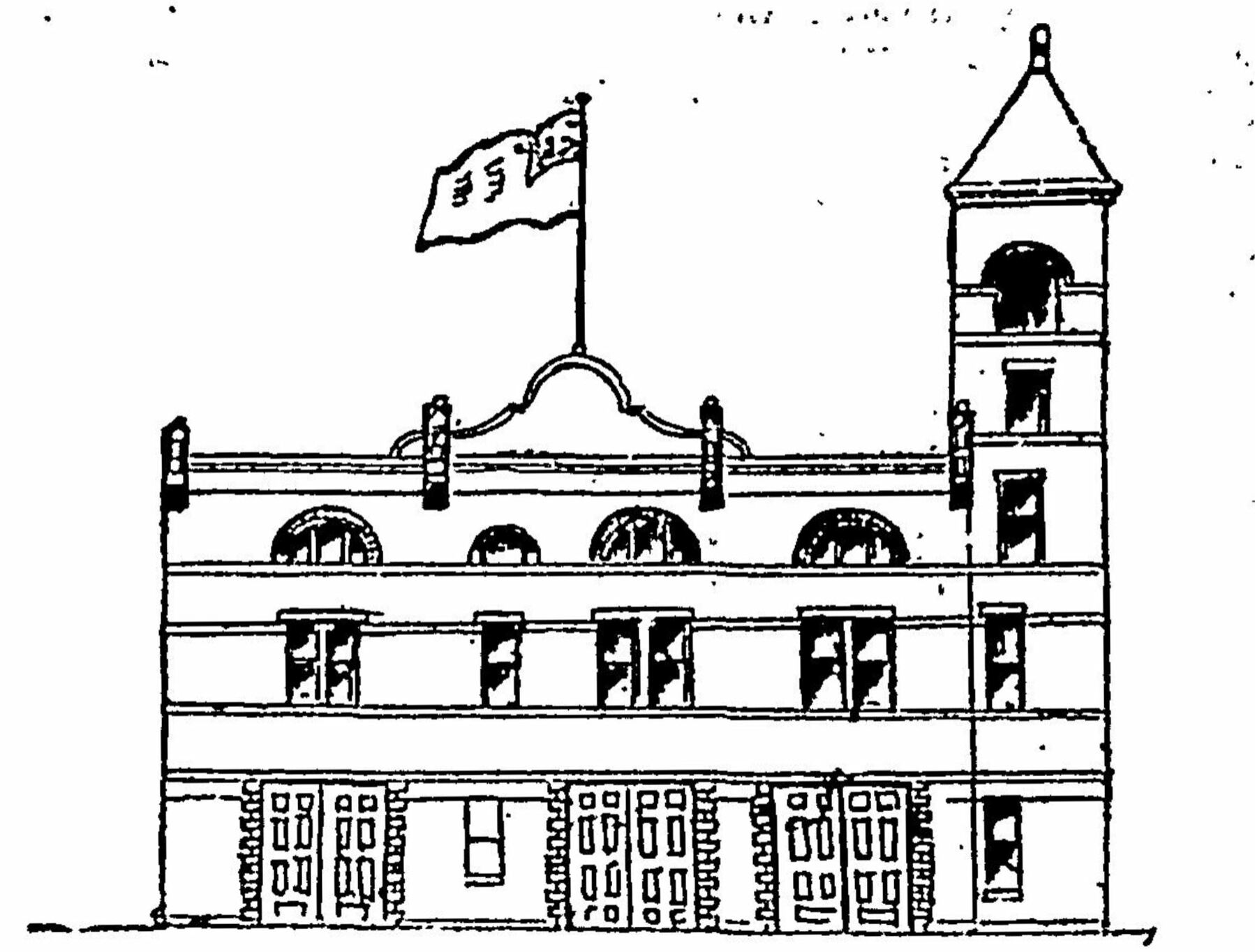
Initial design for the east and west side engine houses in 1896

The East Main Street engine house was designed in 1896, to be identical in interior and exterior design to the original Engine House No. 10 on West Broad Street. Both were locations on the National Road. Construction ran from August 1896 to February 1897. The building cost $12,900 while furnishing and equipment cost $10,700, making for a total expense of $23,600.

In 1933, the station was modified, replacing its original doors with roll-up garage style doors, and removing the top portion of the building's hose tower. In 1951, the station began housing the department's Emergency Squad 1 as well as its gas mask repair shop. In 1963, the National Board of Fire Underwriters recommended retiring the station, and it closed in 1970. The Columbus Compact Corporation renovated the building into a community outreach center.

== Status ==
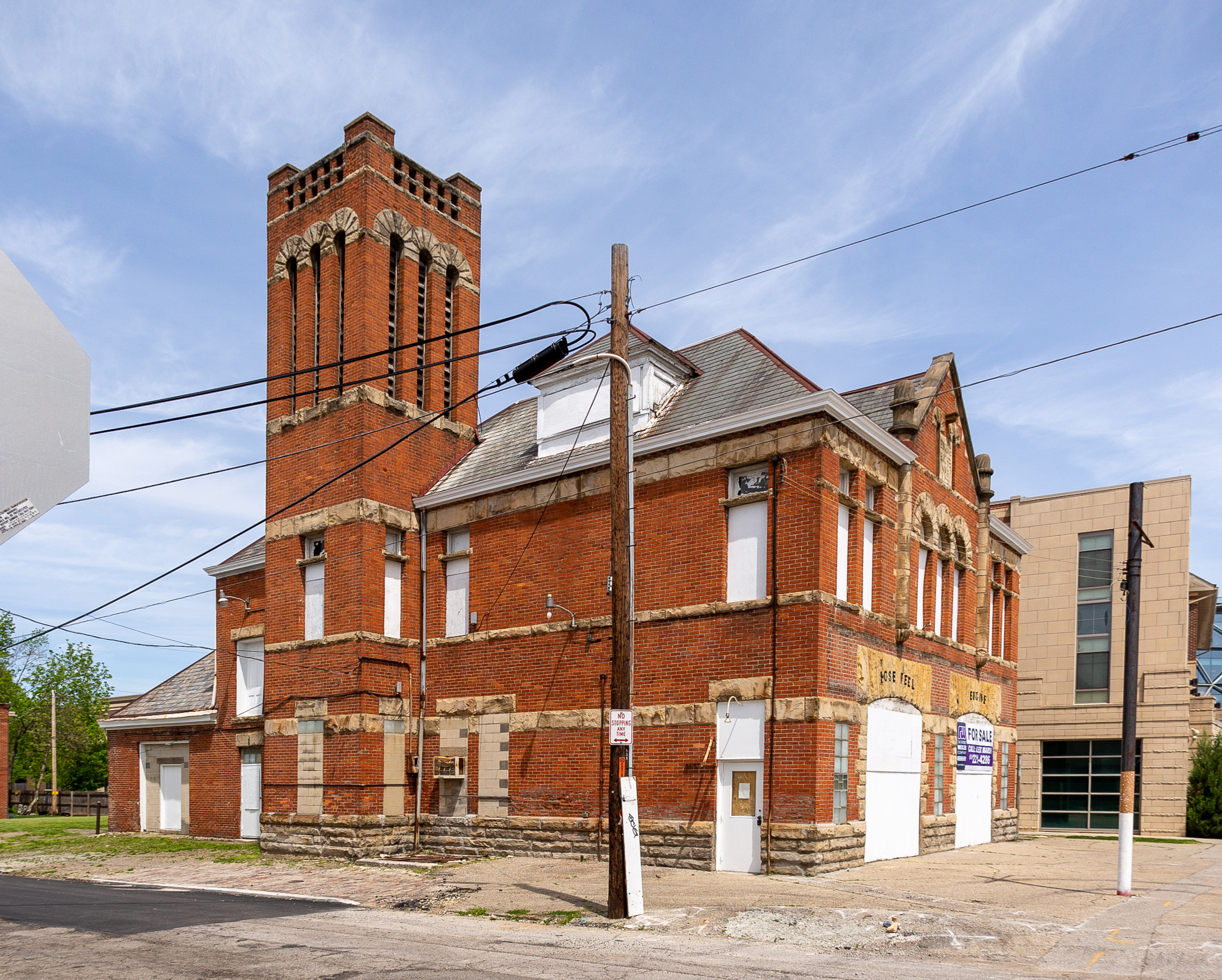
Engine House No. 6

The station is one of about twelve built or reconstructed in the city in the 1880s to 1890s. Of these, seven remain, though in various conditions. The other remaining stations in Columbus are:

- Engine House No. 5, built in 1894, at 121 Thurman Avenue
- Engine House No. 6, built in 1892, at 540 W. Broad Street
- Engine House No. 7, built in 1888, at 31 Euclid Avenue
- Engine House No. 8, built in 1888, at 283 N. 20th Street
- Engine House No. 10, built in 1897, at 1096 W. Broad Street
- Engine House No. 12, built in 1897, at 734 Oak Street

== See also ==
- Fire stations in Columbus, Ohio
