= Engine House No. 8 (Columbus, Ohio) =

Former fire station in Columbus, Ohio

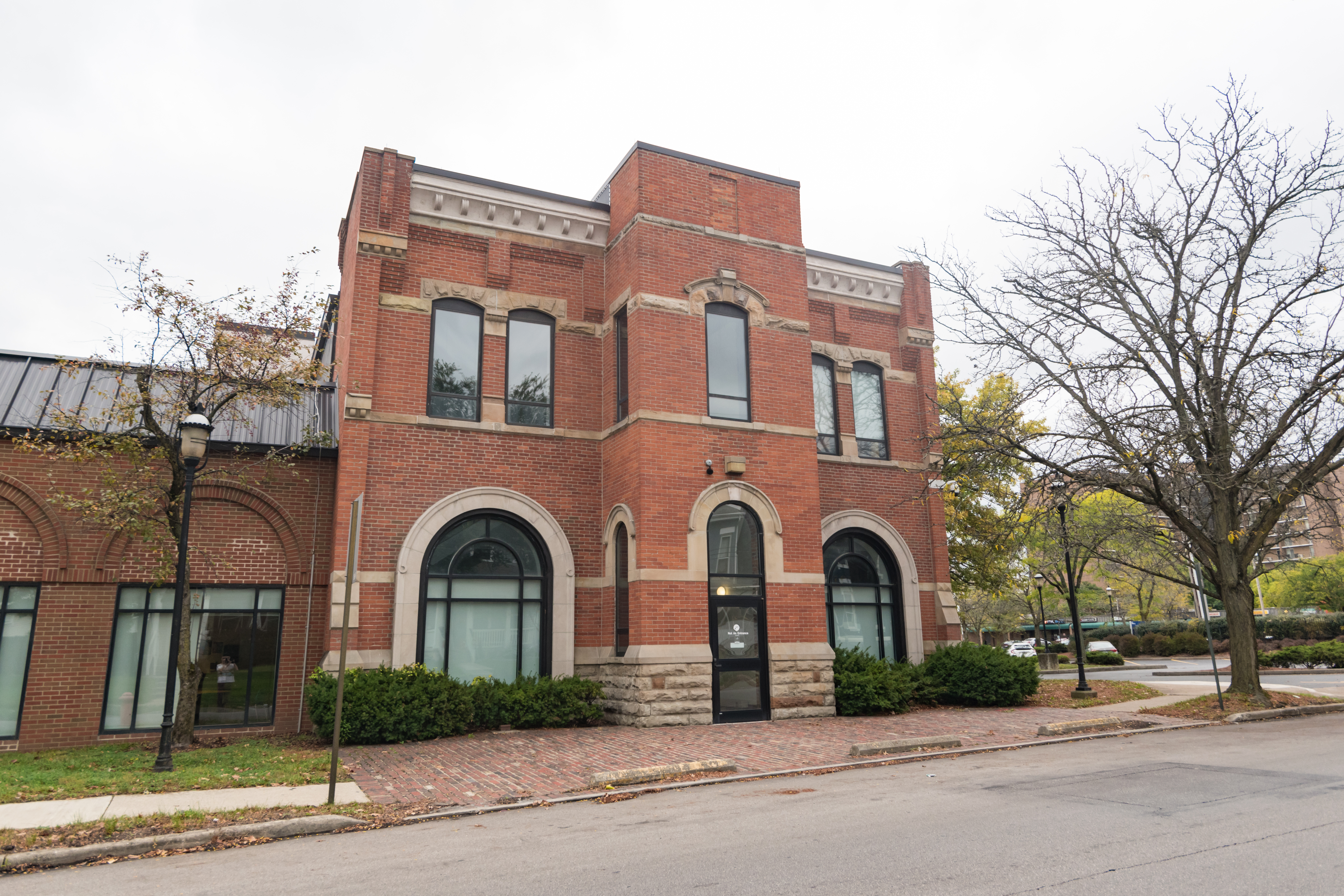
- Location: 283 N. 20th Street, Columbus, Ohio
- Coordinates: 39.97148°N 82.97364°W
- Built: 1888
- Architectural style(s): Romanesque Revival

Engine House No. 8, also known as the Twentieth Street Engine House, is a former Columbus Fire Department station in the Mount Vernon neighborhood of Columbus, Ohio. The building was constructed in 1888, designed in the Romanesque Revival style. The station was decommissioned in 1968. In the 1980s, a supermarket was built around the original structure; today the firehouse and supermarket buildings are used as the Franklin County Department of Job and Family Services' East Opportunity Center.

== Attributes ==
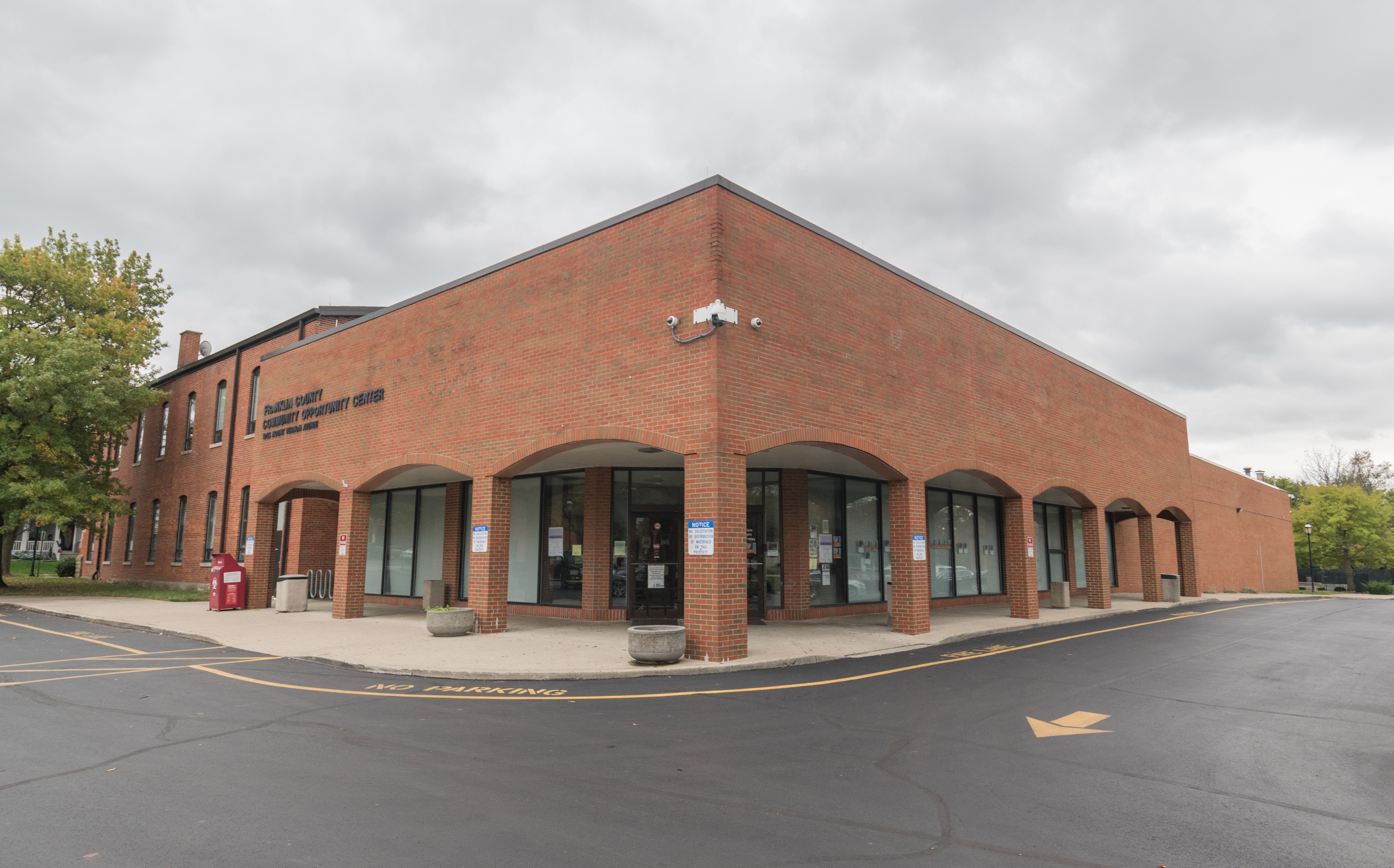
East Opportunity Center main entrance

The Engine House No. 8 building is today a portion of the larger East Opportunity Center. The office, at Mount Vernon Avenue and 20th street, is at the busiest intersection of the Mount Vernon neighborhood, once a bustling and thriving area in the community. The office has approximately 60 social workers managing caseloads for 15,000 people.

In the present-day, the office is used to help residents find employment and end reliance on welfare programs. The office's programming includes high school and equivalent courses, remedial education, and ESL education, as well as job development and skills training.

The old firehouse is visibly similar to Engine House No. 7, which was put into service on the same day.

== History ==
The building was constructed in the 1880s. Its fire alarm was first tested on September 20, 1887, and it and Engine House No. 7 were both put into service on April 9, 1888. In February 1897, residents in the surrounding area complained that while the building was designed large enough to house a hook and ladder truck, it had never received one, and South Columbus received most of the department's hook and ladder vehicles. In July of that year, a nearby livery stable caught fire, demolishing it and three houses, while severely scorching the engine house and injuring firefighters from Engine Company 11.

The firehouse was taken out of service in 1968. In 1979, the building was determined to be eligible for listing on the National Register of Historic Places.

In 1982, Columbus architect John W. Spencer devised a plan to renovate the station while creating a federally-subsidized supermarket. The 2.5-acre site would be redeveloped at a cost of $2.5 million. It would involve a new building adjoining the south and west walls of the firehouse. The supermarket's brick would resemble the firehouse's original brick. The side of the supermarket facing 20th street would include some arches resembling the station's arches; new windows would also match the firehouse's older windows. After the plan was approved, it was delayed in order for the Ohio Historical Society and Advisory Council on Historic Preservation to review the project, as it had been deemed eligible for the National Register. While the supermarket was determined to have an adverse effect on the engine house's setting, the project was to restore original features of the building, including its bell tower. The building operated as Singletary's PlazaMart, which Franklin County later bought for $460,000 and renovated for $1.5 million.

On September 22, 1992, Franklin County opened the East Opportunity Center in the renovated supermarket and firehouse buildings. The firehouse reopened the same day, called Children's Firehouse, a daycare center owned by the county and run by Columbus State Community College as a free program by the county's Human Services Department. The daycare is open to children of adults who are part of the jobs program there.

In 2022, Hammond Harkins Galleries displayed works by noted Columbus artist Aminah Robinson. These works included "Teaching Tools: Community Life/Fire Engine House No. 8", a work transcribing the history of Engine House No. 8.

== Status ==
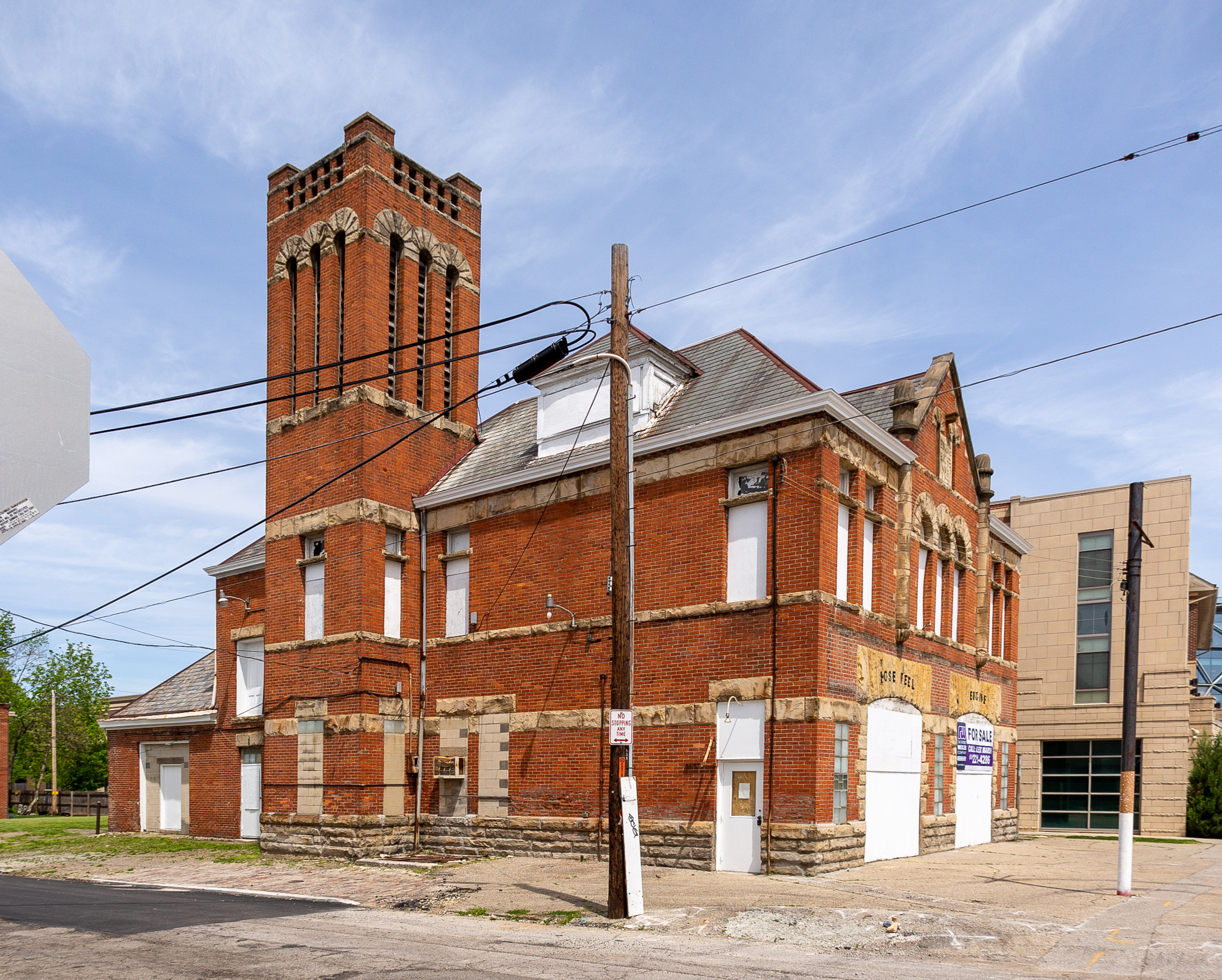
Engine House No. 6

The station is one of about twelve built or reconstructed in the city in the 1880s to 1890s. Of these, seven remain, though in various conditions. The other remaining stations in Columbus are:

- Engine House No. 5, built in 1894, at 121 Thurman Avenue
- Engine House No. 6, built in 1892, at 540 W. Broad Street
- Engine House No. 7, built in 1888, at 31 Euclid Avenue
- Engine House No. 10, built in 1897, at 1096 W. Broad Street
- Engine House No. 11, built in 1897, at 1000 E. Main Street
- Engine House No. 12, built in 1897, at 734 Oak Street

== Gallery ==
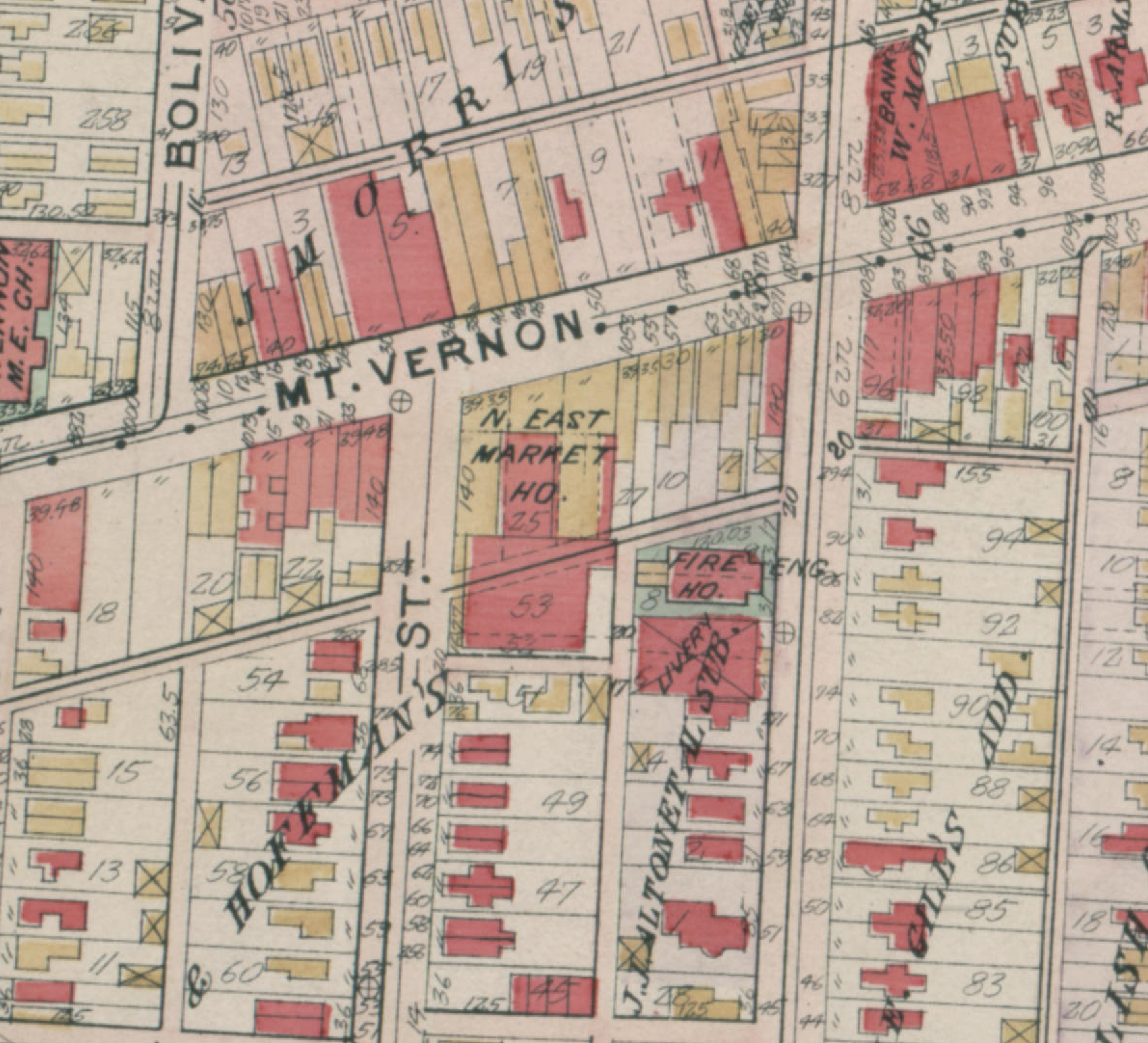
1910 map of the firehouse

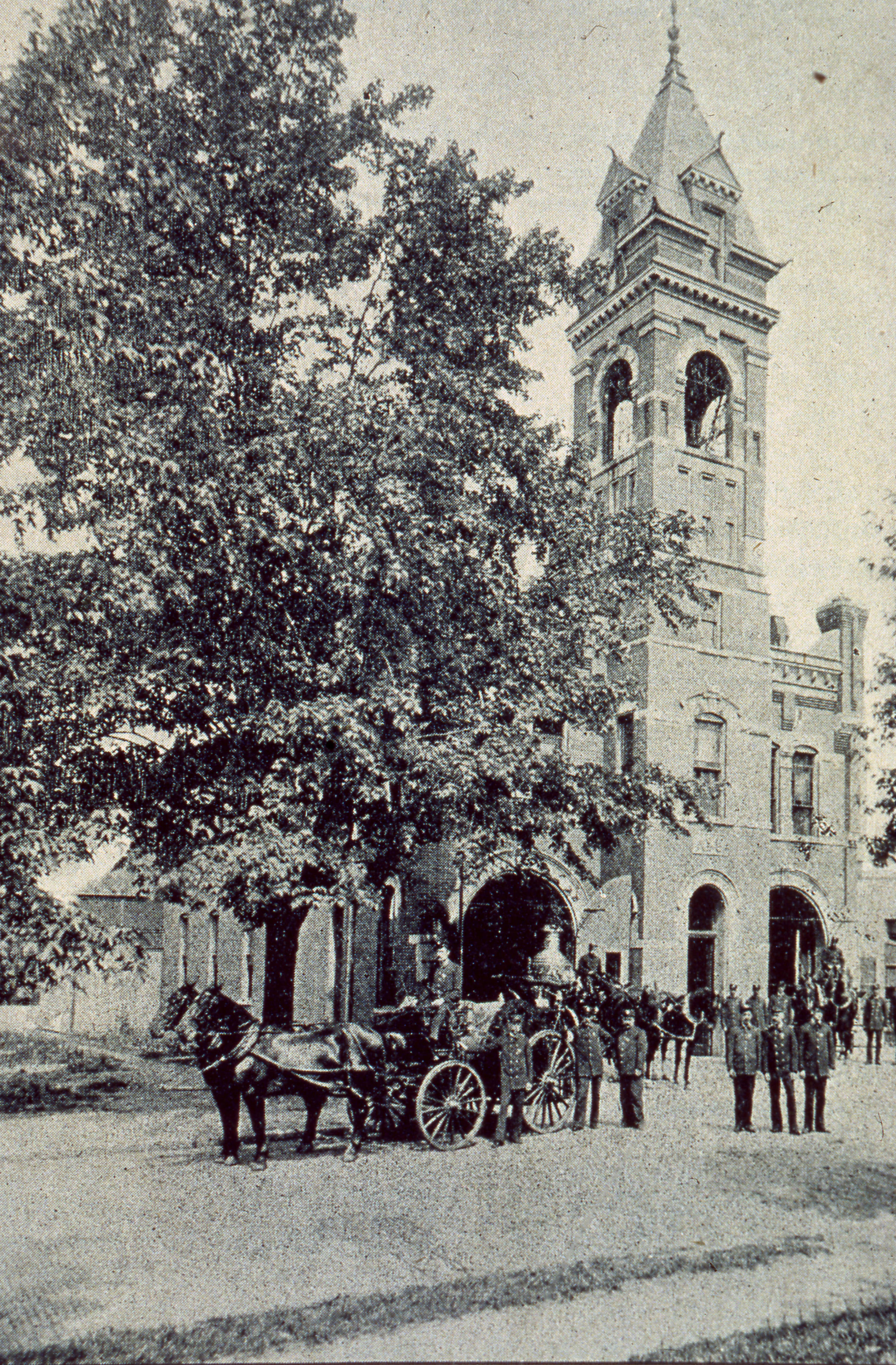
C. 1894 view

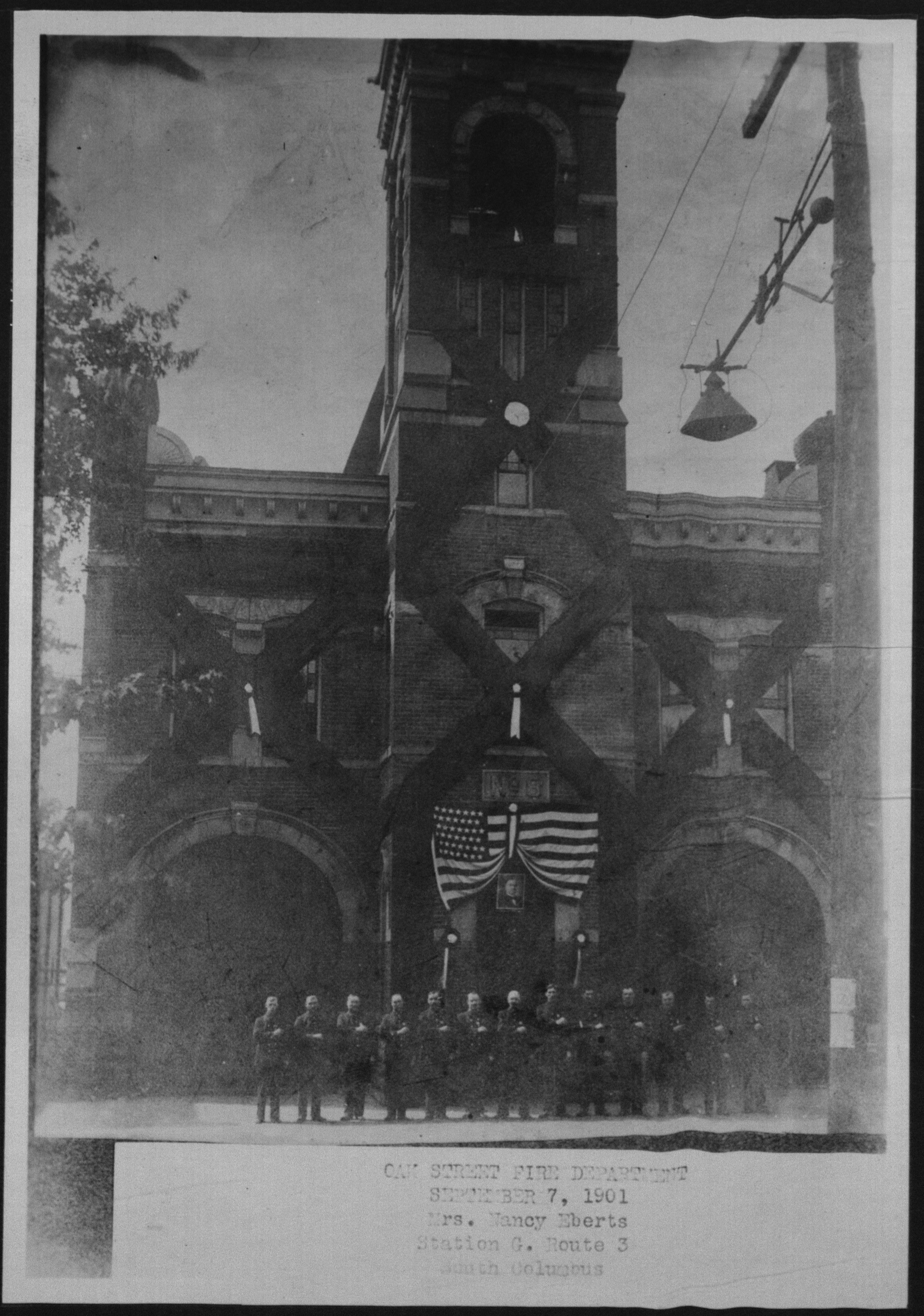
1901 view, decorated mourning McKinley's assassination

== See also ==
- Fire stations in Columbus, Ohio
