= Columbus Division of Fire =

Fire department of Columbus, Ohio

Operational area
- Country: United States
- State: Ohio
- City: Columbus
- Address: 3639 Parsons Avenue

Agency overview
- Established: 1822
- Fire chief: Vacant

Facilities and equipment
- Battalions: 7
- Stations: 35

Website
- www.columbus.gov/Services/Public-Safety/Fire

Interactive map of active CFD fire stations

The Columbus Division of Fire (CFD) provides fire protection and emergency medical services to Columbus, Ohio.

The department operates 35 stations; the newest station opened March 2020. The stations are divided into seven battalions. The Columbus Division of Fire oversees 35 engine companies, 16 ladder companies, 5 rescue companies, and 40 EMS transport vehicles as well as several special units and reserve apparatus. It is staffed by a minimum of 292 personnel during daytime hours (first 12 hours) and 331 during nighttime hours (second 12 hours). The department also oversees 39 medic companies. There are 1,592 uniformed and 70 civilian professionals serving the citizens of Columbus, Ohio.

The department is accredited by the Committee on Fire Accreditation International, granted in 2007. At the time, it was the second-largest fire department with the accreditation.

The Division of Fire was created in 1822; at that time it was officially named the Columbus Fire Department.

== Stations ==
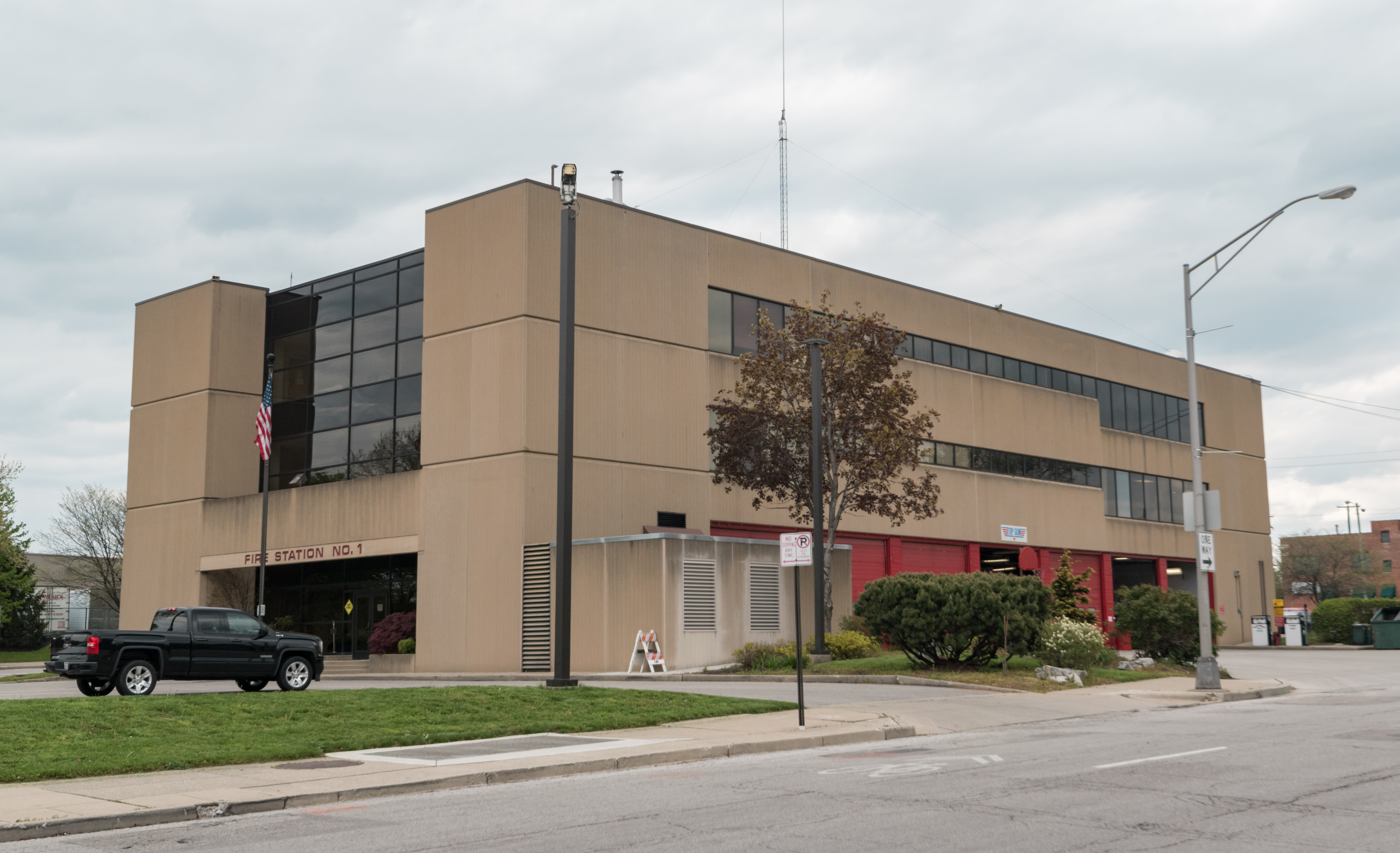
Union Station Engine House (Stations 1 and 9)

=== In use ===
- Station 10, built in 2008
- Station 19, built in 1931

=== Out of use ===
Columbus has numerous historic fire station buildings that are still extant, repurposed for other uses. Stations built in the 1880s to 1890s include:

- Engine House No. 5, built in 1894
- Engine House No. 6, built in 1892
- Engine House No. 7, built in 1888
- Engine House No. 8, built in 1888
- Engine House No. 10, built in 1897
- Engine House No. 11, built in 1897
- Engine House No. 12, built in 1897

Other former stations include:

- Engine House No. 14 (at 1716 Parsons Ave.)
- Engine House No. 16, built in 1908 (today the Central Ohio Fire Museum)
- Engine House No. 17 (at 2300 W. Broad St.)
- Engine House No. 18, built in 1926 (at 1551 Cleveland Ave.)

== See also ==
- Government of Columbus, Ohio
- Station 67, headquarters for Columbus Firefighters Local 67
