= Central Ohio Fire Museum =

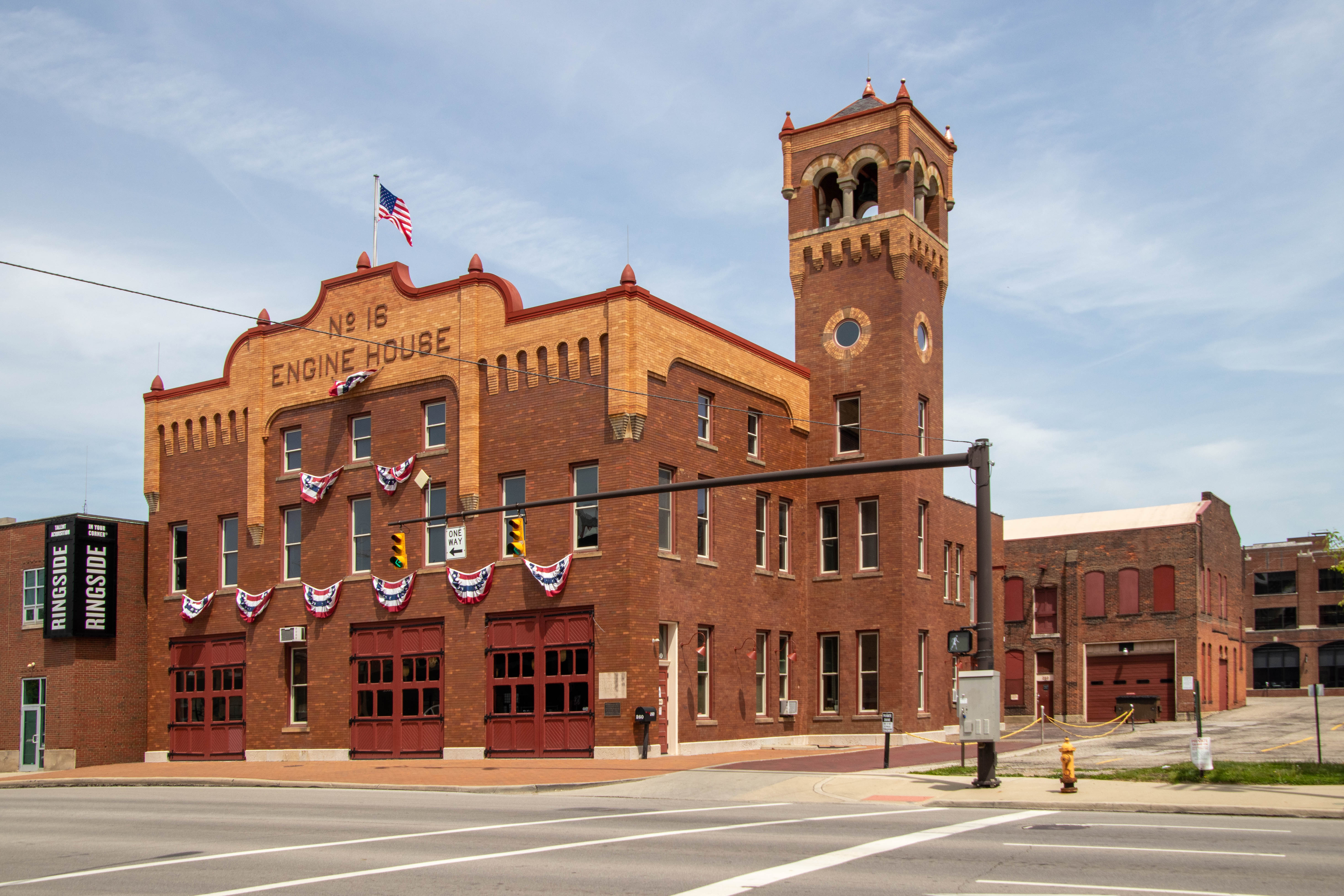
- Location: 260 N. Fourth St., Columbus, Ohio
- Coordinates: 39.968216°N 82.996952°W
- Type: Fire museum
- Public transit access: 6, 9, CMAX
- Website: centralohiofiremuseum.com
- Engine House No. 16
- U.S. National Register of Historic Places
- Columbus Register of Historic Properties
- Area: Less than one acre
- Built: 1908
- Architect: A. C. Burley
- Architectural style: Late 19th and Early 20th Century American Movements
- NRHP reference No.: 95000580
- CRHP No.: CR-19

Significant dates
- Added to NRHP: May 11, 1995
- Designated CRHP: May 9, 1983

The Central Ohio Fire Museum is a firefighting museum in Downtown Columbus, Ohio, housed in the former Engine House No. 16 of the Columbus Fire Department, built in 1908. It was listed on the Columbus Register of Historic Properties in 1983 and the National Register of Historic Places in 1995.

Details of the building's plans were released in September 1908, drawn by department architect A. C. Burley. The building was renamed Station No. 1 when the old Engine House No. 1 at Front and Elm streets closed. The fire station was one of several built to similar design, along with Engine House No. 14 and Engine House No. 15.

The building was completed in 1908, built as the last in the city to accommodate horse-drawn engines (the transition to motorized equipment began one year later). It was remodeled several times for larger equipment, and was closed in 1982 when the new Station No. 1 was built two blocks away. The city began leasing the station to the Central Ohio Fire Museum, which facilitated a restoration of the building's exterior in 1990. The facade's third story and decorative parapet were rebuilt, along with the top of its hose tower. New doors were added based on the original design as well.

== See also ==
- Museums in Columbus, Ohio
- National Register of Historic Places listings in Columbus, Ohio
