= Eddie Rickenbacker =

American World War I aviator (1890–1973)

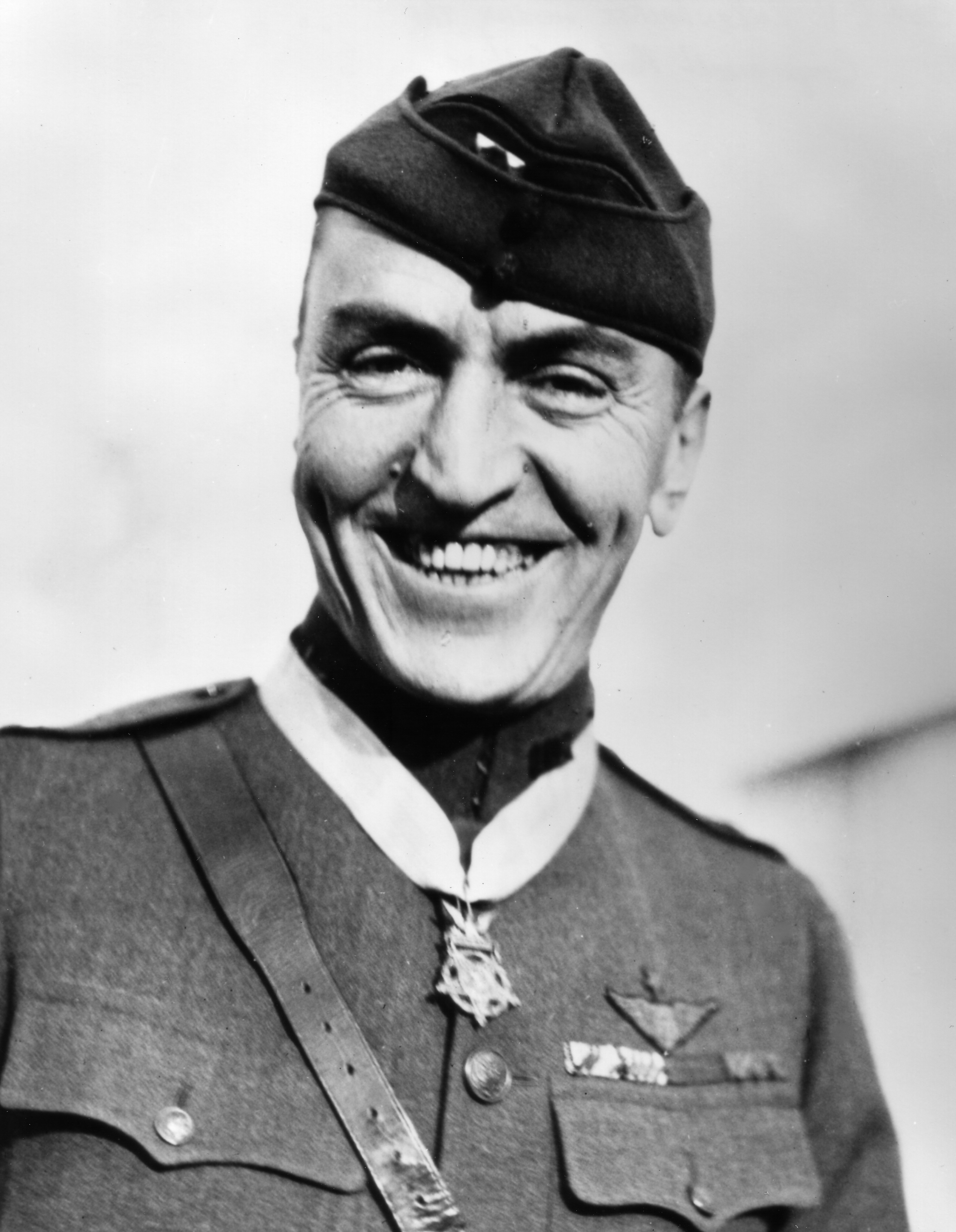
- Rickenbacker wearing the Medal of Honor in 1931
- Born: Edward Rickenbacher; October 8, 1890; Columbus, Ohio, U.S.
- Died: July 23, 1973 (aged 82); Zürich, Switzerland
- Burial place: Green Lawn Cemetery (Columbus, Ohio)
- Spouse: Adelaide Frost Durant (m. 1922)
- Military career
- Nickname: Rick
- Military career
- Allegiance: United States
- Branch: United States Army Air Service
- Service years: 1917–1919
- Rank: Major
- Commands: 94th Aero Squadron
- Conflicts: World War I
- Awards: Medal of Honor; Distinguished Service Cross; Medal for Merit; Legion of Honour (France); Croix de Guerre (France)
- Other work: Rickenbacker Car Company; Indianapolis Motor Speedway; Eastern Air Lines

Champ Car career
- 42 races run over 5 years
- Best finish: 3rd (1916)
- First race: 1912 Indianapolis 500 (Indianapolis)
- Last race: 1916 Championship Award; Sweepstakes (Ascot Speedway)
- First win: 1914 Sioux City 300 (Sioux City)
- Last win: 1916 Championship Award; Sweepstakes (Ascot Speedway)
| Wins | Podiums | Poles |
|---|---|---|
| 7 | 14 | 0 |

Edward Vernon Rickenbacker (born Edward Rickenbacher, October 8, 1890 – July 23, 1973) was an American fighter pilot in World War I and a Medal of Honor recipient. With 26 aerial victories, he was the most successful and most decorated United States flying ace of the war. He was also a racing driver, an automotive designer, and a long-time head of Eastern Air Lines.

== Early life ==
Rickenbacker was born Edward Rickenbacher in Columbus, Ohio. He was the third of eight children born to German-speaking Swiss immigrants, Lizzie (née Liesl Basler) and Wilhelm Rickenbacher. Later in life, he changed the spelling of his last name to Rickenbacker and adopted a middle name, Vernon.

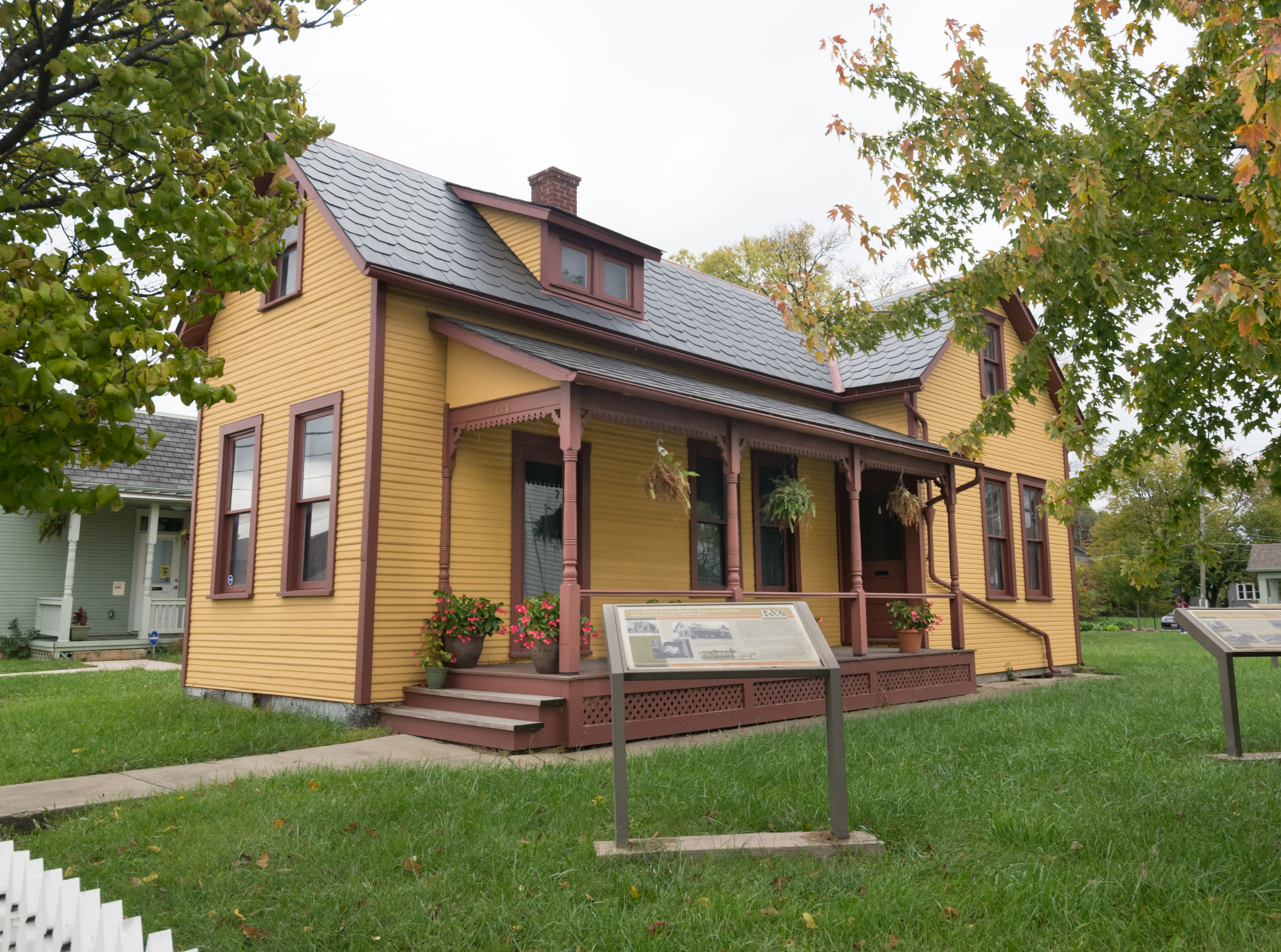
Rickenbacker's childhood home

His father worked for breweries and street-paving crews and his mother Lizzie took in laundry to supplement the family income. In 1893, his father owned a construction company. With a loan from Lizzie's parents, the couple purchased a lot and built a small home at 1334 East Livingston Avenue, 2 miles (3.2 km) southeast of downtown at the edge of the city limits in 1893. The house lacked running water, indoor plumbing, and electricity. This is where Edd, as he was called by his parents, spent his childhood.

Growing up, Rickenbacker worked before and after school. He helped in the garden where the family grew potatoes, cabbages, and turnips and cared for the family's chickens, goats, and pigs. He earned money by delivering papers, setting up pins at a bowling alley, and selling scavenged goods. He gave most of his earnings to his mother but spent some on Bull Durham tobacco, a habit he picked up from his older brother Bill.

As a child, Rickenbacker was accident-prone. Before entering school, he toddled into an oncoming horse-drawn streetcar and fell 12 feet (3.7 m) into an open cistern. His brother rescued him from a passing coal car twice. Once, he ran back into his burning school building to retrieve his coat and nearly paid for it with his life. Sixty years later when producing his autobiography, he found significance in these close calls. He came to believe that God had repeatedly saved him for a higher purpose.

Young Rickenbacker had an artistic side and enjoyed painting watercolors of animals, flowers, and scenery. He tried to design a perpetual motion machine, but, his father berated him for wasting time on an invention with no purpose. He was also "sort of the leader" of the Horsehead Gang, with whom he smoked, played hooky, and broke streetlamps. With the Horsehead Gang, he constructed pushcarts that were a precursor to the Soapbox Derby. Once, the Horsehead Gang took a "roller coaster ride" in a quarry cart and his leg was run over and badly sliced. After the Wright brothers' first airplane flight, Rickenbacker tried to "fly" a bicycle outfitted with an umbrella off of his friend's barn roof.

The summer before Rickenbacker's fourteenth birthday, his father was injured in a brawl. After being hit in the head with a level, Rickenbacker's father was in a coma for almost six weeks before his death on August 26, 1904. His assailant was convicted of manslaughter and sentenced to ten years in prison.

== Career beginnings ==
Though his older siblings Bill and Mary were working, Rickenbacker felt a responsibility to help replace his father's lost income. He dropped out of the seventh grade and went to work full-time, lying about his age to work around child labor laws. He worked eight different jobs during the next two years. While working at the Oscar Lear Automobile Company in 1905, he took an engineering course from the International Correspondence School. Chief engineer Lee Frayer took Rickenbacker under his wing, giving him more responsibility in the workshop.

Two months later, when it came time to compete in the 1906 Vanderbilt Cup race, Frayer brought Rickenbacker to New York as his riding mechanic. After two practice runs, their engine overheated and they failed to get to the starting line for their qualifying run.

Back in Columbus, Rickenbacker followed his mentor to the Columbus Buggy Company as a chief testing engineer, supervising upwards of a dozen men in his department. The sixteen-year-old Rickenbacker's hard work and mechanical acumen impressed Harvey S. Firestone, his new employer. Firestone chose Rickenbacker for special assignments, including troubleshooting in Atlantic City and demonstrating at the 1909 Chicago Automobile Show.

Later that year, Firestone sent Rickenbacker to Texas to figure out why the new Frayer-designed engines were overheating. Rickenbacker solved the problem and stayed on to head up Columbus Buggy's Dallas agency. At eighteen, he was the chief engineer, experimenter, demonstrator, mechanic, and salesman. During this time, he served as a chauffeur to the visiting William Jennings Bryan, getting his picture and his cars in the newspaper. He made three sales as a result. In March 1910, Firestone sent Rickenbacker to direct the Upper Midwest Agency out of Omaha. At nineteen, Rickenbacker was in charge of six men, covering sales, distribution, and maintenance of Firestone-Columbus automobiles in four states. He earned $125 per week (equivalent to $4,300 in 2025).

== Automobile racing ==
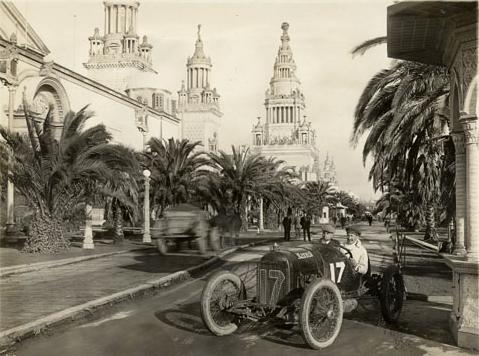
Rickenbacker at the 1915 American Grand Prize at San Francisco

To draw attention to his company's car, Rickenbacker entered a 25-mile (40 km) race in Red Oak, Iowa. He failed to finish in his first automobile race after crashing through an outer fence. That summer, Rickenbacker went on to win most of the dirt track races he entered, including five of six races at Omaha's Aksarben Festival in October. When reporting on races, newspapers misspelled his name as Reichenbaugh, Reichenbacher, or Reichenberger, before settling on Rickenbacker.

The following May, Lee Frayer invited his protégé to join him in another racing venture: the first ever Indianapolis 500. As relief driver, Rickenbacker replaced Frayer in the middle portion of the race, driving the majority of miles and helping his former boss take thirteenth place. The next year, he drove Frayer's Red Wing Special by himself but was forced out after 100 miles (160 km) with mechanical difficulties. Rickenbacker quit his sales job and went on the county fair circuit with a Flying Squadron team.

In October 1912, the American Automobile Association (AAA) cracked down on drivers known for flouting safety regulations. Rickenbacker was barred from the track for the next twelve months. He joined the automobile workshop of Frederick and August Duesenberg in Des Moines, Iowa. For the next year, he worked sixteen-hour days at $3 a day (equivalent to $100 in 2025), developing a Mason race car, named for Duesenberg's chief investor.

In July 1913, Rickenbacker received dispensation from AAA to compete in his hometown Columbus 200-mile race. Somehow, he kept his racing reinstatement through the rest of the season. He won three times and finished the season in 27th place on the AAA standings with 115 points. In 1914, the Duesenberg team separated from their investor, Edward R. Mason. Winning the prize money became vital for Rickenbacker because he would be out of racing for the season if Duesenberg ran out of funds. With some hard driving, he won the Fourth of July race at Sioux City. A third-place finish by another Duesenberg driver brought in $12,500 (equivalent to $402,000 in 2025) and ensured that the team would complete the season. Rickenbacker finished the year in sixth place in the AAA standings.

Rickenbacker was now a national racing figure, earning the nickname "Fast Eddie". One sportswriter called him "the most daring and...the most cautious driver in America today." The top-ranked Peugeot team lured Rickenbacker away from Duesenberg at the start of 1915. However, a couple of bad outings caused him to abandon Peugeot and switch to the Maxwell team. Looking back decades later, Rickenbacker called this "the major mistake of my racing career". Still, he finished the season ranked fifth among all racers, with three victories to his credit. In September 1915, Rickenbacker received financial backing from Indianapolis Speedway owner Carl Fisher and his partner, Fred Allison. They made Rickenbacker the leader of a new Presto-Lite team, giving him free rein over three drivers and four mechanics as they developed four Maxwell Special race cars.

In 1915, newspapers began spelling his name with a second "k" more frequently, with his active encouragement. He also decided his given name "looked a little plain" and adopted a middle initial, signing his name 26 times with different letters before settling upon "V." The Hartford Courant referred to him as "Edward Victor Rickenbacher" after his win at Sheepshead Bay in 1916.

In the 1915–16 seasons, Rickenbacker won at Sioux City for the third year in a row, as well as Tacoma and Sheepshead Bay (New York). In September, he was in a three-way tie for the championship with Dario Resta and Johnny Aitken. He needed a win at the Indianapolis Harvest 100 to take first place. He had the lead in the penultimate lap but had driven his car into the ground. Driving on three wheels, Aitken passed Rickenbacker's broken-down Maxwell Special. Rickenbacker called it "one of the grandest free-for-alls I ever was in." He finished the year in third place in the standings but with a win in Los Angeles. He was now one of the most famous race car drivers in America and was earning $40,000 a year.

Signing with the British Sunbeam team for the upcoming season, Rickenbacker sailed to England to work to develop a new race car. Following his arrival at Liverpool for his new job with Sunbeam, Rickenbacker was briefly detained by two plainclothes agents from the Metropolitan Police prior to disembarking from his ship. A 1914 Los Angeles Times article had falsely claimed that the young driver was Baron Rickenbacher, "the disowned son of a Prussian noble." Amidst the ongoing First World War, this led the police to suspect Rickenbacker of being a German spy.

Following his release, Rickenbacker worked at the Sunbeam shop in Wolverhampton during the week and spent his weekends at the Savoy Hotel in London. The Metropolitan Police surveilled Rickenbacker during the six weeks he spent in England and for another two weeks when he was back in the United States. In 1917, due to his experience as a suspected spy and in order to anglicize his name, he officially changed the spelling of his name from Rickenbacher to Rickenbacker. A few years later, Rickenbacker settled on the middle name "Vernon" after the brother of his boyhood crush, Blanche Calhoun.

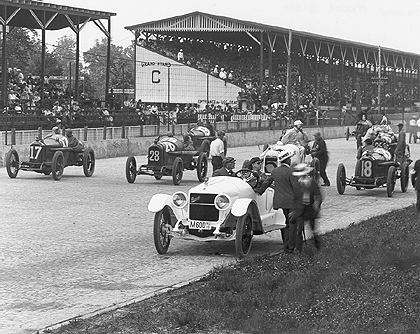
Rickenbacker (second from right, White #5) lined up to start second in the 1916 Indianapolis 500

=== Motorsports career results ===
==== Indianapolis 500 results ====
| Year | Car | Start | Qual | Rank | Finish | Laps | Led | Retired |
|---|---|---|---|---|---|---|---|---|
| 1912 | 16 | 13 | 77.300 | 22 | 21 | 44 | 0 | Bearing |
| 1914 | 42 | 23 | 88.140 | 19 | 10 | 200 | 0 | Running |
| 1915 | 23 | 19 | 81.970 | 20 | 19 | 103 | 0 | Rod |
| 1916 | 5 | 2 | 96.440 | 2 | 20 | 9 | 9 | Steering |
| Totals | | | | | | 356 | 9 | |

| Starts | 4 |
| Poles | 0 |
| Front Row | 1 |
| Wins | 0 |
| Top 5 | 0 |
| Top 10 | 1 |
| Retired | 3 |

== World War I ==
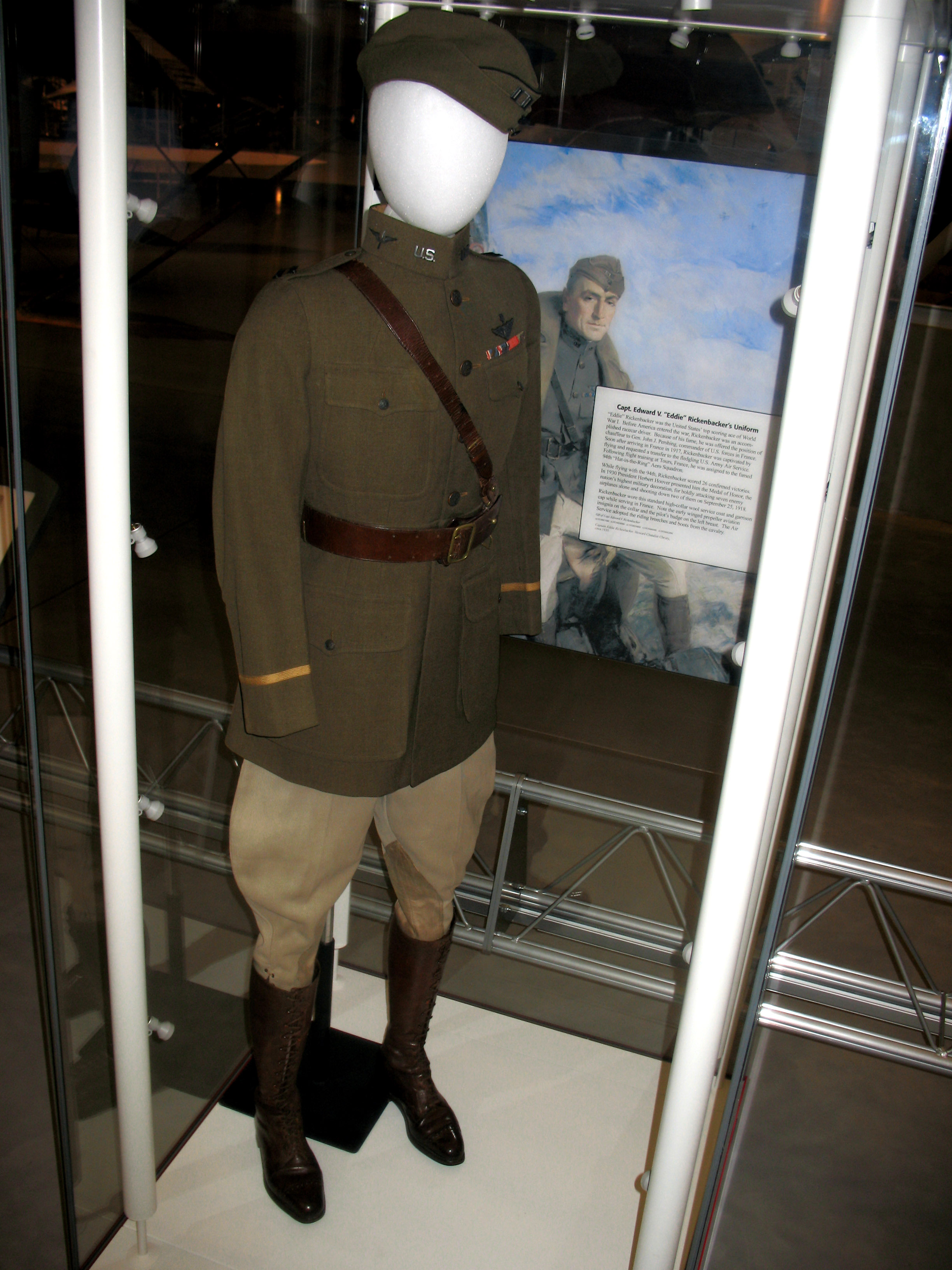
Rickenbacker's uniform on display at the Steven F. Udvar-Hazy Center

=== Pre–U.S. entry ===
While in England, Rickenbacker watched Royal Flying Corps airplanes fly over the Thames from the Brooklands aerodrome. He began to consider a role in aviation if the United States entered the European war. The month before, while he had been in Los Angeles, Rickenbacker had had two chance encounters with aviators. Glenn Martin, founder of Glenn L. Martin Company and more recently with Wright-Martin Aircraft, gave Rickenbacker his first ride aloft. Next, Major Townsend F. Dodd was stranded with his plane in a field and Rickenbacker diagnosed a magneto problem. Dodd later became General John J. Pershing's aviation officer and an important contact in Rickenbacker's attempt to join air combat.

Back in the United States after the revelation of the Zimmermann Telegram, Rickenbacker shared his idea for an aero squadron composed of race car drivers and mechanics with a New York Times reporter: "War would practically put a stop to racing, and we have a training that our country would need in the time of war. We are experts in judging speed and in motor knowledge." His theory was that such men, accustomed to tight confines and making split-second decisions at high speeds, would make excellent fighter pilots, though his idea was ignored by the military. After the April 6 declaration of war by the United States, Rickenbacker went to Washington, D.C. to propose his idea without success.

=== Flight training ===
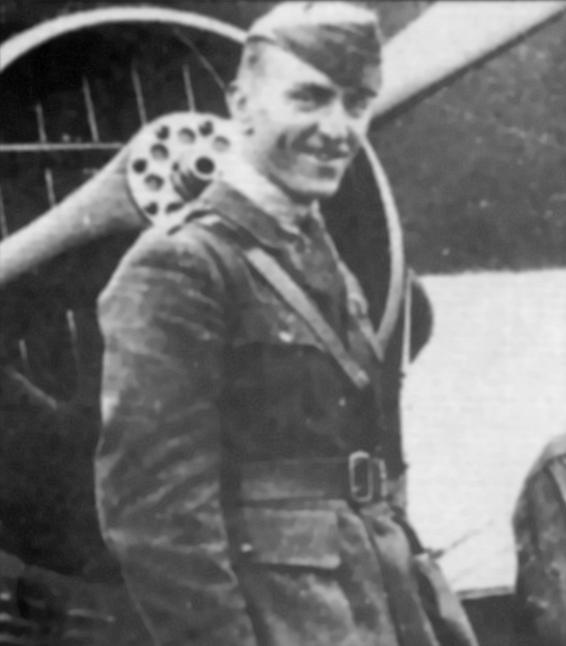
Rickenbacker with airplane

In late May 1917, a week before he was to race in Cincinnati, Rickenbacker was invited to sail to England with General John J. Pershing. By mid-June, he was in France, where he enlisted in the United States infantry. He was assigned to drive Army officials between Paris and A.E.F. headquarters in Chaumont, and on to various points on the Western Front. Rickenbacker earned the rank of Sergeant First Class but never drove for General Pershing. Rather, he mostly drove for Major Dodd. A chance encounter with Captain James Miller on the Champs-Elysees put Rickenbacker on the track to becoming a fighter pilot. Miller asked Rickenbacker to be the chief engineer at the flight school and aerodrome he was establishing at Issoudun. Rickenbacker bargained for the chance to learn to fly at the French flight school outside Toul. He received five weeks of training or 25 hours in the air in September 1917. Then, he went to Issoudun to start constructing the United States Air Service's pursuit training facility.

During the next three months, Rickenbacker took time from his work schedule to continue his flight training, standing in at the back of lectures and taking airplanes up on his own to practice new maneuvers. In January 1918, Rickenbacker finagled his way into a release for gunnery school, the final step to becoming a pursuit pilot.

In February and March, Lieutenant Rickenbacker and the officers of the nascent 1st Pursuit Group completed advanced training at Villeneuve–les–Vertus Aerodrome. There he came under the tutelage and mentorship of the French flying ace, Major Raoul Lufbery. With regards to flying, Rickenbacker said, "All I learned, I learned from Lufbery". Lufbery took Rickenbacker and Douglas Campbell on their first patrol before their Nieuport 28s were outfitted with machine guns. Rickenbacker earned the respect of the other fliers, who called him "Rick".

Both squadrons relocated to Toul, in the St. Mihiel sector, where Rickenbacker had begun his training with the French seven months earlier. Now the American air service had its aerodrome at nearby Gengoult. Before beginning their patrols, the two squadrons chose an insignia to paint on their planes. The 95th chose a kicking mule. The 94th chose an Uncle Sam stovepipe hat, tipped inside a surrounding circle. One officer remarked, "Well, I guess our hat is in the ring now!", and the squadron became known as The Hat-in-the-Ring Gang.

=== Early aerial combat ===
Film footage of Rickenbacker on a bombing run over German lines

Rickenbacker's first sortie was with Reed Chambers on April 13, 1918. It almost ended in disaster when both became lost in the fog and Chambers was forced to land. Flight commander David Peterson called Rickenbacker a "bloody fool for flying off in a fog". Two weeks later, on April 29, Rickenbacker shot down his first enemy plane. On May 28, he claimed his fifth victory and became an ace. Rickenbacker received the French Croix de Guerre that month. However, Rickenbacker was not perfect: he almost fired on friendly planes several times, his gun jammed, and he nearly crashed when his Nieuport's fabric wing tore off in a dive.

On May 30, 1918, he achieved his sixth victory, but it would be his last for three and a half months. In late June, he had a fever and ear infection that turned into an abscess and grounded him most of the Chateau Thierry campaign. While recovering in a Paris hospital in July, Rickenbacker reflected on his shortcomings as a pilot, deciding he needed more self-discipline and less impetuosity.

Rickenbacker was out of the hospital in time for the St. Mihiel offensive based out of Rembercourt Aerodrome on September 12, 1918. By this time, the 94th and the other squadrons of the 1st Pursuit had converted from their agile but temperamental Nieuport airplanes to the more rugged, higher-powered Spad XIII. The Spad was a good fit for Rickenbacker's style of attack. He made another kill on September 14 against a Fokker D-VII, and another the day after that. Although Rickenbacker's performance was rising, the 94th squadron's was still disappointing. After a sluggish summer at Chateau Thierry, Major Harold Hartney wanted new leadership to return the Hat-in-the-Ring Gang to its prior level of effectiveness. He chose Lieutenant Rickenbacker over several captains as the new commander of the 94th Squadron.

=== Commander of the 94th Aero Squadron ===
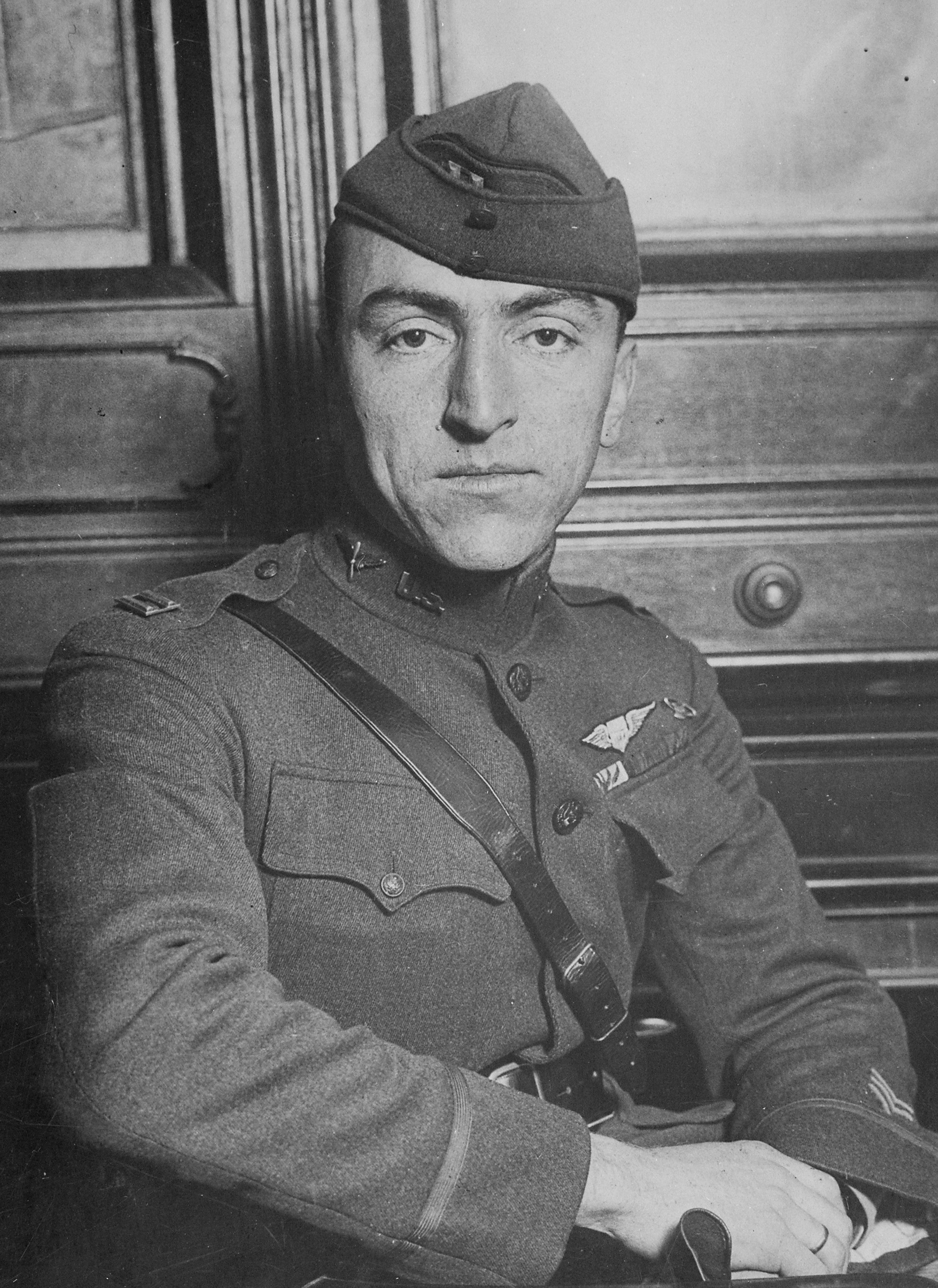
Capt. Eddie Rickenbacker, United States Army Air Service, c. 1919

Rickenbacker went to work turning his men "back into a team". He gathered his pilots and exhorted them to stay focused on their mission. Reminding the mechanics that he was one of them, he stressed the crucial importance of their work. Above all, he let them know that he was a "gimper" or "a bird who will stick by you through anything" and "would never ask anybody to do anything that [he] would not do [him] self first or do at the same time." To underscore his point, Rickenbacker took a solo patrol over the line and shot down two enemy planes the next morning. His victories above Billy, France, earned him the Medal of Honor, awarded by President Herbert Hoover in 1931.

Building on the leadership skills he developed with Maxwell, Rickenbacker turned the 94th Squadron into a winning team. He was determined to "blind the eyes of the enemy" by taking out their observation balloons. The giant gas bags appeared easy to bring down, but were heavily guarded and dangerous to attack. Rickenbacker led planning sessions for multi-squadron raids of as many as fourteen planes. One reporter likened him to a football coach, "boning up for the season ahead" with "conferences on methods, blackboard talks, and ideas for air battle tactics". Rickenbacker was credited with bringing down five balloons.

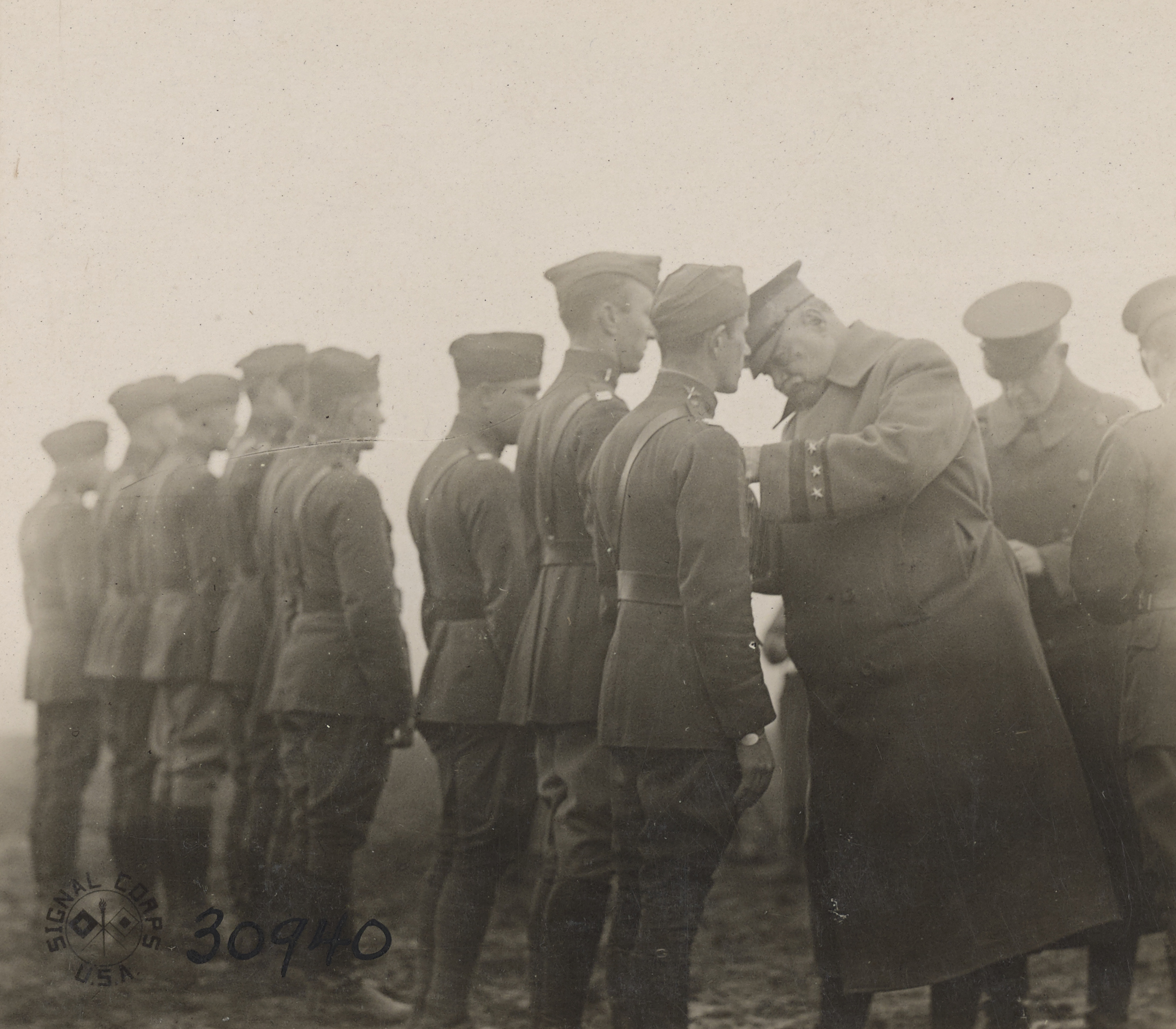
Lieutenant General Hunter Liggett, commander of the U.S. First Army, decorating Captain Eddie Rickenbacker with the DSC at Remicourt, Marne, France, November 10, 1918.

Rickenbacker inculcated into the squadron with his new principles of engagement, which germinated while he was confined in the hospital: Never attack unless there is at least a fifty-fifty chance of success, always break off an engagement that seems hopeless, and know the difference between cowardice and common sense. He continued to fly aggressively, but with calculated caution. He also flew more patrols and spent more hours in the air than any other pilot in the service—a total of 300 combat hours. He brought down fifteen aircraft in the final six weeks of the war. In September 1918, he received the rank of captain. At the end of the war in France, the 94th had the highest number of air victories of the American squadrons.

When Rickenbacker learned of the Armistice, he flew an airplane above the No Man's Land to observe the ceasefire as it occurred at 11:00 a.m. on November 11, 1918. He later wrote, "I was the only audience for the greatest show ever presented. On both sides of no man's land, the trenches erupted. Brown-uniformed men poured out of the American trenches, gray-green uniforms out of the German. From my observer's seat overhead, I watched them throw their helmets in the air, discard their guns, wave their hands."

=== Military achievements ===
Rickenbacker received the Distinguished Service Cross a record number of eight times. In 1930, one of these awards was upgraded to the Medal of Honor. In addition, he received the Legion of Honor and the Croix de Guerre from France.

Officially, he brought down 26 aircraft during the war (though several more were reportedly unconfirmed), making him the United States ace of aces for the war. His 26 victories remained the American record until Richard Bong's forty victories in World War II. The following data is from Rickenbacker's book, Fighting the Flying Circus. New York: Frederick A. Stokes, 1919, pp. 363–364.

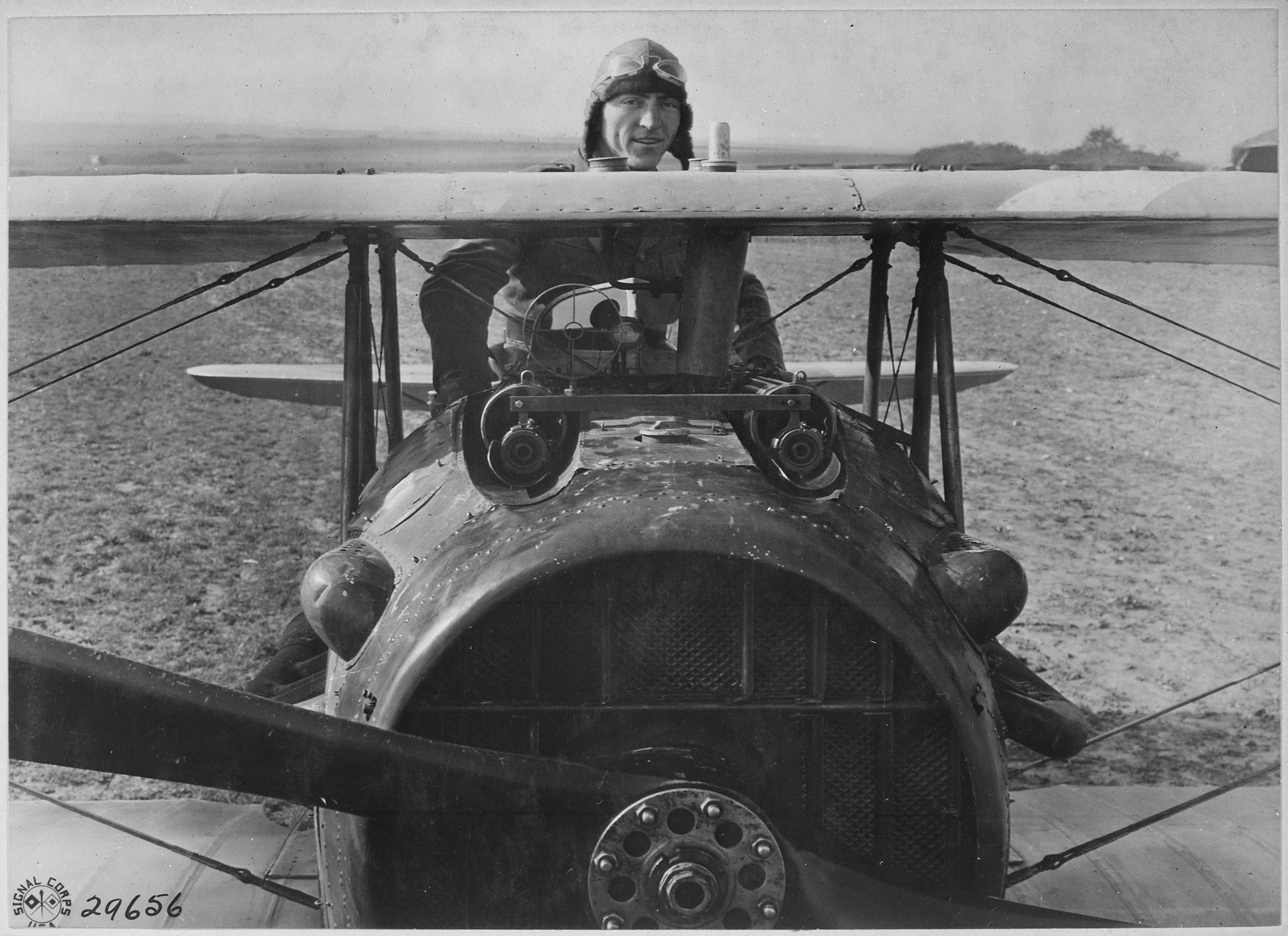
Rickenbacker in his SPAD S.XIII

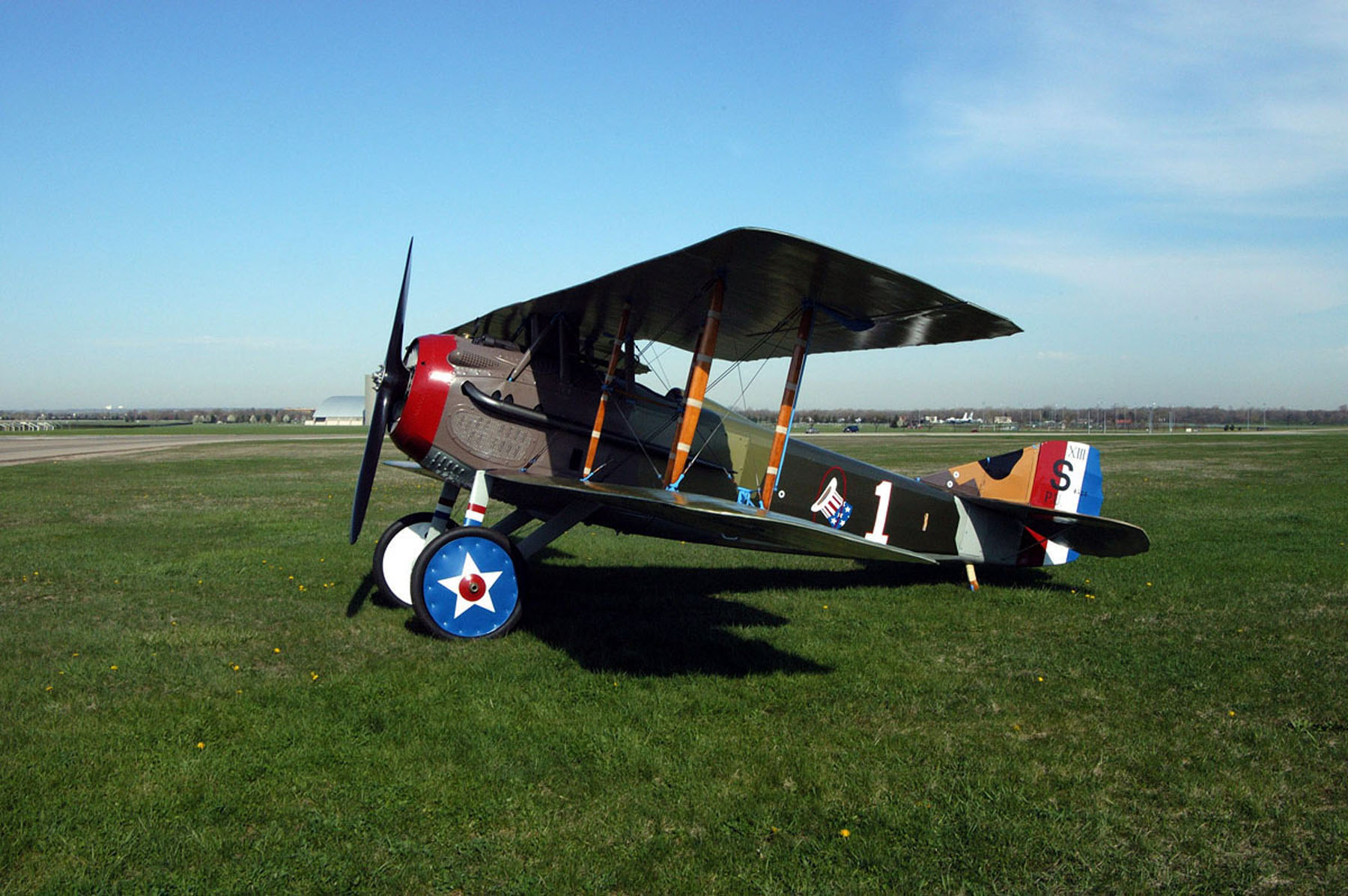
SPAD XIII in the colors of the 94th Aero Squadron. The aircraft is marked as Eddie Rickenbacker's aircraft.

| Verified Aerial Victory | Date | Time | Aircraft | Opponent | Location |
|---|---|---|---|---|---|
| 1 | Apr 29, 1918 | 1810 | Nieuport | Pfalz D.III | Baussant |
| 2 | May 7, 1918 | 0805 | Nieuport | Pfalz D.III | Pont-à-Mousson |
| 3 | May 17, 1918 | 1824 | Nieuport | Albatros D.V | Ribécourt |
| 4 | May 22, 1918 | 0912 | Nieuport | Albatros D.V | Flirey |
| 5 | May 28, 1918 | 0925 | Nieuport | Albatros C.I | Bois de Rate |
| 6 | May 30, 1918 | 0738 | Nieuport | Albatros C.I | Jaulny |
| 7 | Sep 14, 1918 | 0815 | SPAD XIII | Fokker D.VII | Villecey |
| 8 | Sep 15, 1918 | 0810 | SPAD XIII | Fokker D.VII | Bois de Waville |
| 9 | Sep 25, 1918 | 0840 | SPAD XIII | Fokker D.VII | Billy |
| 10 | Sep 25, 1918 | 0850 | SPAD XIII | Halberstadt C | Forêt de Spincourt |
| 11 | Sep 26, 1918 | 0600 | SPAD XIII | Fokker D.VII | Damvillers |
| 12 | Sep 28, 1918 | 0500 | SPAD XIII | Balloon | Sivry-sur-Meuse |
| 13 | Oct 1, 1918 | 1930 | SPAD XIII | Balloon | Puzieux |
| 14 | Oct 2, 1918 | 1730 | SPAD XIII | Hannover CL | Montfaucon |
| 15 | Oct 2, 1918 | 1740 | SPAD XIII | Fokker D.VII | Vilosnes |
| 16 | Oct 3, 1918 | 1707 | SPAD XIII | Balloon | Dannevoux |
| 17 | Oct 3, 1918 | 1640 | SPAD XIII | Fokker D.VII | Cléry-le-Grand |
| 18 | Oct 9, 1918 | 1752 | SPAD XIII | Fokker D.VII | Dun-sur-Meuse |
| 19 | Oct 10, 1918 | 1552 | SPAD XIII | Fokker D.VII | Cléry-le-Petit |
| 20 | Oct 10, 1918 | 1552 | SPAD XIII | Fokker D.VII | Cléry-le-Petit |
| 21 | Oct 22, 1918 | 1555 | SPAD XIII | Fokker D.VII | Cléry-le-Petit |
| 22 | Oct 23, 1918 | 1655 | SPAD XIII | Fokker D.VII | Grande Carne Ferme |
| 23 | Oct 27, 1918 | 1450 | SPAD XIII | Fokker D.VII | Grandpré |
| 24 | Oct 27, 1918 | 1505 | SPAD XIII | Fokker D.VII | Bois de Money |
| 25 | Oct 27, 1918 | 1635 | SPAD XIII | Balloon | Saint-Juvin |
| 26 | Oct 30, 1918 | 1040 | SPAD XIII | Balloon | Remoiville |

== Between the wars ==
=== War hero ===
Rickenbacker returned home as a war hero. At the Waldorf-Astoria, 600 people, including Secretary of War Newton Baker and his mother, shuttled in from Columbus. They "cheered him and toasted him and shouted and sang to him". On the streets, he was mobbed by souvenir seekers who tore buttons and ribbons off his uniform. He noted, "The onslaught was pretty heavy, more than I liked, but I took it...." Los Angeles gave him a parade in June.

Rickenbacker turned down several endorsement offers and an opportunity to star in a feature film. He said producer Carl Laemmle "shoved a hundred-thousand-dollar certified check under my nose". Rickenbacker turned down these opportunities because he did not want to cheapen his image. He signed a book deal worth $25,000 (equivalent to $460,000 in 2025), publishing his memoir of the war, Fighting the Flying Circus. Rickenbacker also contracted for a speaking tour for $10,000; still in the Army, Rickenbacker also used this tour to promote liberty bonds. After the Liberty Bond tour, he was promoted to major, and released from the army in November 1919. However, Rickenbacker felt the rank of captain was the only one that was "earned and deserved," and preferred and was referred to as Captain Eddie or just "the Captain" for the rest of his life.

Rickenbacker had a name he could capitalize on in any business he chose. He told a reporter, "There is no comparison between the auto and the air. I am through with the automobile and I stand ready to place my skill and talents in flying." Around December 1919, Rickenbacker talked to Reed Chambers about a joint venture in aircraft manufacturing. However, the performance and safety of airplanes were a concern for the government and the general public. Rickenbacker resorted to his promotional abilities to generate public and governmental enthusiasm, but with limited success. In 1920 and 1921, he made four transcontinental crossings—twice in Junkers-Larsen JL-6s and twice in de Havilland DH-4s. During these trips, he had seven crack-ups, nine near misses, and eight forced landings in cornfields.

In 1925, Rickenbacker was a defense witness, along with Hap Arnold, Carl Spaatz, Ira Eaker, and Fiorello H. La Guardia, in the court-martial of General Billy Mitchell.

=== Rickenbacker Motor Company ===
In October 1919, Rickenbacker accepted an offer from millionaire Byron F. Everitt of Everitt-Metzger-Flanders to develop a new car under the name Rickenbacker Motor Company (RMC). Other partners in the business were Harry Cunningham and Walter Flanders.

Rickenbacker designed the car, with Ray McNamara developing its core engineering. Rickenbacker's most significant innovation was the tandem flywheel construction at the rear of the crankshaft that reduced vibration. The Rickenbacker automobile model took two years of development and 100,000 miles (160,000 km) of test driving by Rickenbacker before being unveiled at the New York Auto Show in 1922.

RMC marketed its vehicle as "A Car Worthy of Its Name" and also used the Hat-in-the Ring squadron symbol. It was a high-quality mid-priced car, "up to the minute in every detail". RMC models sold for $1,500 to $2,000. Because it "offers the least resistance to radio because of vibration", the Rickenbacker was selected to make the first transcontinental radio tour in June 1922. The next year, Leo Wood extolled its smooth ride in a pop song, "In My Rickenbacker Car".

In mid-1923 Rickenbacker introduced his next innovation—four-wheel brakes. A decade earlier, he had benefited from these on the race track and wanted to make them standard on his commercial vehicles. However, his decision to make a mid-year introduction was costly. Rickenbacker blamed sales problems on a concerted industry media attack led by Studebaker. He said, "That broke me; it was more responsible for my going broke...than anything else." A second mid-year change in 1924 left RMC dealers feeling mistreated and taking a financial hit. In 1925, the Rickenbacker model 8 was the pace car of the Indianapolis 500.

RMC declined when Rickenbacker failed to fully focus on RMC and continued work on aviation. In addition, the company's production engineer, Walter Flanders, died. Above all, the arrival of the less expensive, equally reliable Chrysler cut into the RMC market. As RMC sales dropped and leadership bickered, Rickenbacker resigned from his role as vice president and director of sales. In November 1927, the company went bankrupt. Because he was a founder, Rickenbacker was responsible for $250,000 of debt.

=== Florida Airway ===
While he was supposed to be focusing on RMC, Rickenbacker tried to achieve speed and distance records in aviation across the United States. His focus shifted to creating a light plane that would be affordable for private ownership. In January 1923, he announced the Glider Trophy, an annual worldwide contest he established to encourage experimentation with glider design. The Trophy cost $5,000 to produce.

In 1926, Rickenbacker started Florida Airways, with wartime comrade Reed Chambers. Investors in the company included Henry Ford, Richard C. Hoyt of the Hayden, Stone & Co. financial empire, and Percy Rockefeller. Ford's investment included supplying three new airplanes.

Florida Airways began carrying airmail in April and passengers two months later, going between Miami and Jacksonville. However, Florida Airways was out of business before completing a full year of operations. It was a victim of the 1926 hurricane, the decline of the Florida real estate boom, and the failure of Tampa officials to deliver a promised airport. The company was purchased from receivership by Harold Pitcairn.

=== Indianapolis Motor Speedway ===
On November 1, 1927, Rickenbacker purchased the Indianapolis Motor Speedway from Carl Fisher for $700,000. He considered his salary of $5,000 a year and the opportunities for public relations to be more valuable than the $700,000 in debt he incurred. He also drove the speedway's pace car for several years.

He operated the Indianapolis Motor Speedway for more than ten years, overseeing many improvements to the facility. He was responsible for the first radio broadcast of the Memorial Day 500 race. After a final 500-mile (800 km) race in 1941, he closed the Speedway to conserve gasoline, rubber, and other resources during World War II. In 1945, Rickenbacker sold the racetrack to the businessman Anton Hulman Jr.

=== General Motors ===
Before going to Detroit to produce his automobile with RMC, Rickenbacker took a job with General Motors (GM) as the California distributor for its new car, the Sheridan. He spent the first eight months of 1921 in California, creating a network of dealerships. He often traveled between cities by plane, a leased Bellanca.

In January 1928, Rickenbacker became assistant general manager for sales at GM for its Cadillac and LaSalle models. Later in the year, he took out a $90,000 loan to buy the Allison Engine Company and earned a significant amount on its resale to GM. Rickenbacker repeated this strategy with Bendix Corporation soon after.

By mid-1929, Rickenbacker returned his focus to aviation. He convinced GM to purchase Fokker Aircraft Corporation of America (FACA), the designer of the fighter planes he once faced on the Western Front. As compensation for his advice, Rickenbacker was promoted to vice president for sales for GM's Fokker Aircraft Company. When Fokker Aircraft relocated its headquarters to Baltimore in 1932, Rickenbacker left. He became the vice president for governmental relations for American Airways, part of American Air Transport. While there, he convinced American Air Transport to purchase North American Aviation.

Ten months later, he left American Air Transport and returned to GM, convincing the automaker to purchase North American Aviation. When the deal went through in June 1933, Rickenbacker became vice president for public affairs in GM's new aviation venture. North American Aviation was the parent company for Eastern Air Transport, Curtiss-Wright Corporation, and Trans World Airlines.

In 1934, in an effort to curtail no-bid contract corruption, President Franklin D. Roosevelt rescinded existing mail contracts with private airlines and moved air mail transportation to the U.S. Army Air Corps. At the time, Rickenbacker was vice president of Eastern Air Transport, one of the companies affected. He became an outspoken critic of Roosevelt's New Deal policies, seeing them as little better than socialism. This drew criticism and ire from the press and the Roosevelt administration, which ordered NBC Radio to no longer allow Rickenbacker to broadcast his criticisms of Roosevelt's policies. When several inexperienced, undertrained Army pilots crashed and died while hauling mail on treacherous routes, Rickenbacker called it "legalized murder!"

=== Eastern Air Lines ===
Rickenbacker called upon his connections to achieve a merger of Eastern Air Transport with Florida Airways, forming Eastern Air Lines. In early 1935, Rickenbacker became general manager of Eastern Air Lines. In April 1938, after learning that GM was considering selling Eastern to John D. Hertz, Rickenbacker met with GM's chairman of the board, Alfred P. Sloan, and bought the company for $3.5 million.

Under his leadership, Eastern Air Lines grew from a company flying a few thousand miles per week into a major airline. Rickenbacker oversaw many radical changes in the field of commercial aviation. He negotiated with the U.S. government to acquire air mail routes, a great advantage to companies that needed regular income. He helped develop and support new aircraft designs. Rickenbacker bought larger and faster airliners, including the four-engine Lockheed Constellation and Douglas DC-4. He also collaborated with pioneers of aviation design, including Donald W. Douglas, the founder of the Douglas Aircraft Company and the designer and builder of the DC-4, DC-6, DC-7, and DC-8 (its first jet airliner).

=== Comic strips ===
Rickenbacker scripted the popular Sunday comic strip, Ace Drummond, from 1935 to 1940 for King Features Syndicate. He worked with aviation artist and author Clayton Knight, who illustrated the series. The strip followed the adventures of barnstormer Drummond as he traveled around the world and defeated evil-doers. The comic was cross-promoted through Rickenbacker's Junior Pilots Club which distributed buttons featuring Ace Drummond characters. Ace Drummond was adapted into a film serial, a radio program, and a Big Little Book, Ace Drummond (Whitman Publishing Co., 1935).

Between 1935 and 1940, Knight and Rickenbacker created another Sunday comic strip for King Features. Called The Hall of Fame of the Air, this fact-based comic featured airplanes and air battles of famous aviators and aces. As one modern writer noted, "Whether 'America's Ace of Aces' wrote the pieces or not; his name added authenticity to the strip." This comic strip was adapted into a Big Little Book, Hall of Fame of the Air, by Whitman Publishing Co. in 1936.

== World War II ==
=== Support for Britain ===
Rickenbacker supported the war effort as a civilian. While initially supporting the isolationist movement, Rickenbacker officially left the America First organization in 1940, having been a member for a few months. He then took an outspoken pro-British stance. He was inspired by "England's heroic resistance to relentless air attacks" from the Luftwaffe's campaign during the Battle of Britain in 1940, writing: "Should these gallant British withstand the terrific onslaught of the totalitarian states until the summer of 1941, it is my sincere conviction that by that time this nation will have declared war."

Rickenbacker was one of a few celebrities who participated in campaigns to rally World War I veterans to the British cause before the attack on Pearl Harbor. In 1942, he toured training bases in the southwestern United States and England. He encouraged the American public to contribute time and resources and pledged Eastern Air Lines equipment and personnel for use in military activities. Under Rickenbacker's direction, Eastern Air Lines flew munitions and supplies across the Atlantic to the British.

In 1942, with a letter of authorization from Henry L. Stimson, U.S. Secretary of War, Rickenbacker visited England on an official war mission and made ground-breaking recommendations for better war operations. He inspected troops, operations, and equipment, serving in a publicity role to increase support from civilians and soldiers. Later, he worked with both the Royal Air Force and the United States Army Air Forces on bombing strategy, including work with air chief marshal Sir Arthur Harris and general Carl Andrew Spaatz.

=== Adrift at sea ===
In October 1942, Stimson sent Rickenbacker on a tour of air bases in the Pacific Theater of Operations to review living conditions and operations. In addition, he was to deliver a secret message from the president to General Douglas MacArthur. After visiting several air and sea bases in Hawaii, Rickenbacker was provided with a B-17D Flying Fortress (AAF Ser. No. 40-3089) as transportation to the South Pacific. Due to faulty navigation equipment, the bomber strayed hundreds of miles off course while on its way to a refueling stop on Canton Island. When the airplane ran out of fuel, the pilot, Captain William T. Cherry Jr., was forced to ditch or water land the airplane in a remote part of the Pacific Ocean.

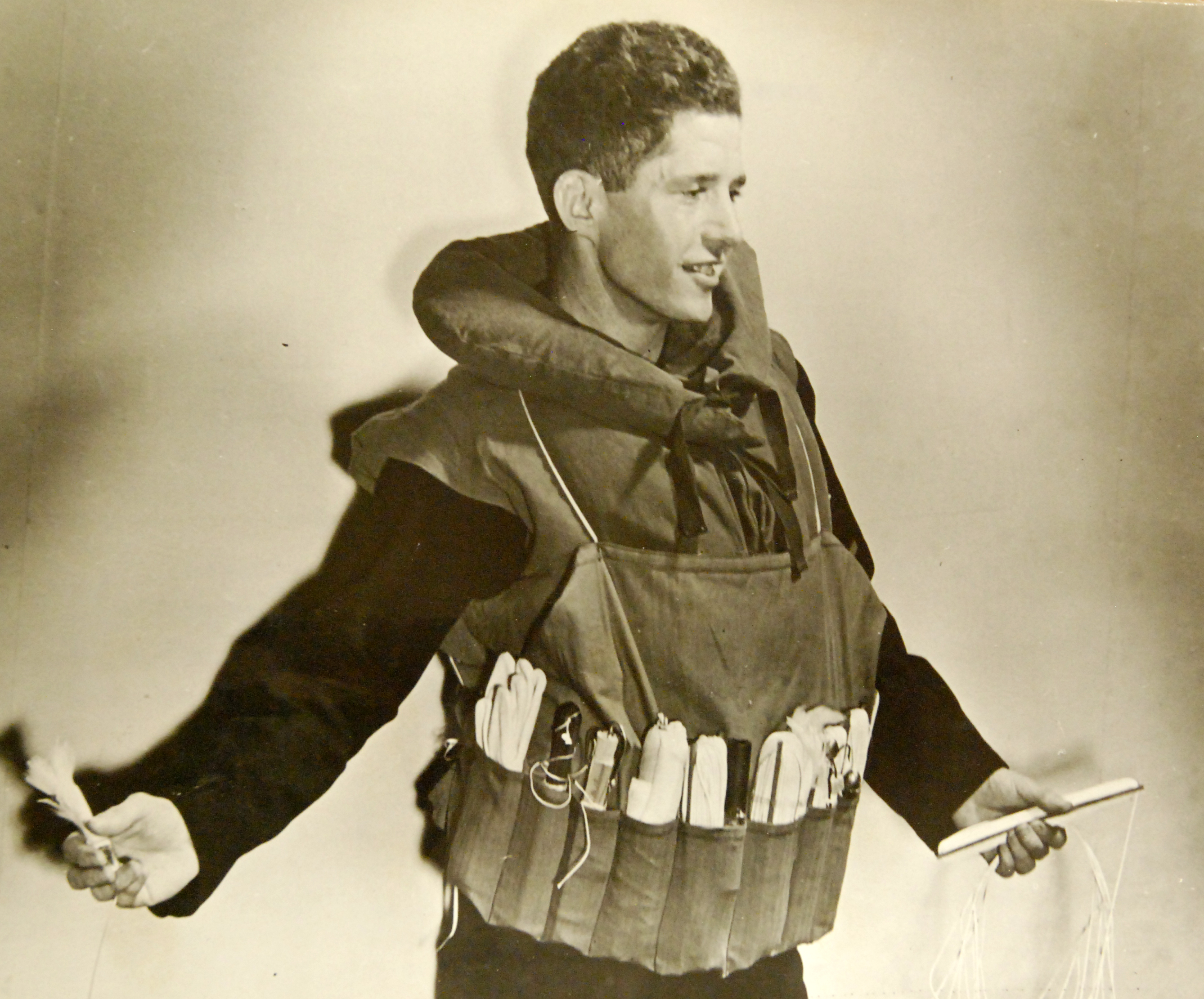
Rickenbacker's experience resulted in every Navy life raft being equipped with an emergency fishing kit.

For 24 days, Rickenbacker, Army Captain Hans C. Adamson (his friend and business partner), and six crewmen drifted for thousands of miles at sea in life rafts. Adamson sustained serious injuries during the ditching. The other crewmen—John Bartek, Wiliam Cherry, John De Angelis, Alexander Kaczmarczyk, James Reynolds, and James Whittaker—were hurt to varying degrees. Their food supply ran out after three days. On the eighth day, a tern landed on Rickenbacker's head. He captured it, and the bird became both a meal for the men and fishing bait. They survived on sporadic rainwater and small fish that they caught with their bare hands. While suffering from dehydration, Kaczmarczyk drank seawater; he died after two weeks adrift and was buried at sea.

The U.S. Army Air Forces and the U.S. Navy's patrol planes planned to abandon the search for the lost B-17 crewmen after just over two weeks, but Rickenbacker's wife convinced them to search for another week. However, the newspapers and radio reported that Rickenbacker was dead.

The surviving men split up. Cherry rowed off in the small raft and was rescued on day 23. Reynolds, De Angelis, and Whittaker found a small island that was close to an inhabited island where the natives were hosting an allied radio station. A U.S. Navy patrol OS2U-3 Kingfisher float-plane rescued the survivors on November 13, 1942, in the Ellice Island chain (now Tuvalu). All were suffering from exposure, sunburn, dehydration, and near starvation. He had lost 40 pounds (18 kg), but after a few days of rest, Rickenbacker completed his assignment and delivered his message to General MacArthur.

The failure in the airplane's navigation was blamed on an out-of-adjustment bubble octant that gave a systematic bias to all of its readings. The octant suffered a severe shock in a failed takeoff attempt in a different bomber. When the bomber's landing gear brakes seized, the crew unknowingly moved the damaged bubble octant to Rickenbacker's plane. This ditching spurred the development of improved navigational instruments and also better survival gear for the air crewmen.

In 1943, Rickenbacker wrote Seven Came Through about his experience, saying he was lost for 21 days. He corrected the number to 24 days in his 1967 autobiography.

=== 1943 mission to the USSR ===
Still determined to support the war effort, Rickenbacker suggested a fact-finding mission in the Soviet Union to provide the Soviets with technical assistance with their American aircraft. To get approval for this trip, Rickenbacker approached Soviet diplomats, rather than President Roosevelt. By trading favors with the Soviet ambassador and with Stimson's help, Rickenbacker secured permission to travel to the Soviet Union. Stimson assigned Rickenbacker to visit the bases and production facilities in the Aleutian Islands, Burma, China, India, the Middle East, North Africa, and the Soviet Union. The War Department provided everything Rickenbacker needed, including a highly unusual letter giving the bearer permission to "visit...any...areas he may deem necessary for such purposes as he will explain to you in person", signed by the Secretary of War.

In April 1943, Rickenbacker began his trip, traveling to Cairo, Egypt, in a United States Army Air Forces C-54 provided by General Henry H. Arnold. Rickenbacker made observations at every stop and reviewed American operations with a critical eye, forwarding reports to authorities. From Cairo, he traveled by C-87 to India to experience the Hump airlift into China—he reported unfavorably on the Hump airlift to Arnold after his return to the United States. Continuing into China, Rickenbacker was impressed by the determination of the Chinese people but disgusted with the corruption of the Kuomintang government. Next, he went to Iran and, from there, to the Soviet Union.

In the Soviet Union, Rickenbacker observed wartime conditions, the dedication and patriotism of the Russians, and the denial of food to those deemed unproductive to the war effort. He befriended many Soviet officials and shared his knowledge of the aircraft they had received from the United States. He was lavishly entertained by the Soviets and recalled attempts by NKVD agents to get him intoxicated enough to disclose sensitive information.

Rickenbacker's mission was successful. A commander of Moscow's defense had stayed at Rickenbacker's home in 1937, and this personal connection aided his information-gathering. He learned about Soviet defense strategies and capabilities. When the Battle of Kursk started, he took advantage of the Soviets' distraction, viewing and memorizing a map that detailed the locations of Soviet military units at the front. He also persuaded his hosts to give him an unprecedented tour of the Shturmovik aircraft factory. However, Rickenbacker made comments during his trip that alerted the Soviets to the existence of the secret B-29 Superfortress program.

After Rickenbacker visited the Soviet Union, British prime minister Winston Churchill interviewed him. In the United States, Rickenbacker's information resulted in some diplomatic and military action; however, the president did not meet with him. For his support of the war effort, Rickenbacker received the Medal for Merit from the United States government.

== Postwar ==
For a time, Eastern was the most profitable airline in the postwar era. During the late 1950s, however, Eastern Air Lines' fortunes declined. Rickenbacker was forced out of his position as CEO on October 1, 1959. At the age of 73, Rickenbacker also resigned as the chairman of the board on December 31, 1963.

In the 1960s, Rickenbacker became a well-known speaker. He shared his vision for the future of technology and commerce, exhorting Americans to respect the Soviet Union during the Cold War, but still uphold American values. He also endorsed many conservative ideas.

In 1967, Rickenbacker published his autobiography, giving a special edition to the employees of Eastern Air Lines.

== Personal life ==
Washington Times article about Rickenbacker and his wife. September 3, 1922

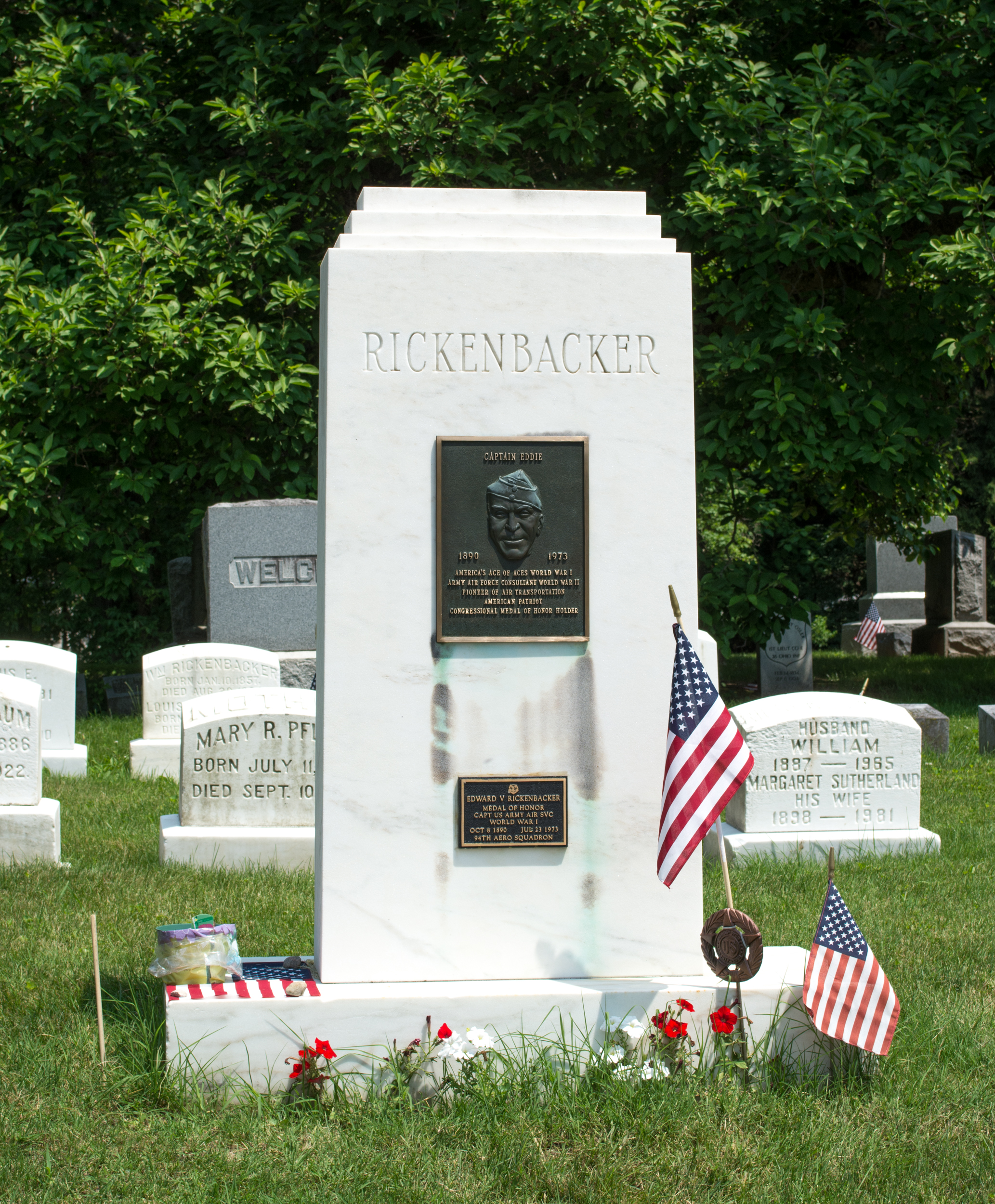
Rickenbacker's grave

Rickenbacker met Adelaide Frost Durant, 5 years his senior, in Los Angeles before World War I. At the time, she was married to Clifford Durant, a racing competitor of Rickenbacker and the hard-partying son of William Durant of General Motors fame. Durant was also an abusive husband. Adelaide chose to get a hysterectomy to ensure she would bear him no children. Her father-in-law stepped in to allow her to live independently, buying her a comfortable home and giving her $220,000 in equities, half being GM stock.

Rickenbacker saw Adelaide again in New York in 1921 and was smitten. She finalized her divorce in July 1922, and the two were married on September 16, 1922, in Cumberland Presbyterian Church of South Beach, Connecticut. Following a seven-week honeymoon in Europe, the newlyweds set up home at Indian Village Manor in Detroit, Michigan. They adopted two boys: David Edward in 1925, and William Frost in 1928. Before the second adoption, the couple purchased a home in Grosse Pointe. In 1931, the family moved to Bronxville, New York. New York City was Rickenbacker's favored home base and remained the couple's primary residence for the rest of their lives, along with their second home in Key Biscayne. They also owned a ranch in Kerr County, Texas, in the 1950s. Both of their sons attended the Asheville School, where Rickenbacker served on the board of trustees.

On February 26, 1941, Rickenbacker was a passenger on Eastern Air Lines Flight 21 on a Douglas DC-3 airliner that crashed outside Atlanta, Georgia. The survivors were rescued after spending the night at the crash site. Rickenbacker barely survived being soaked in fuel and trapped in the wreckage. The press mistakenly announced his death.

In his autobiography, Rickenbacker gave a dramatic retelling of the incident. While he was still conscious and in terrible pain, he was left behind while some ambulances carried away the bodies of the dead. When he arrived at the hospital, his injuries were so severe that the emergency surgeons and physicians left him for dead for some time. The doctors instructed their assistants to "take care of the live ones". Rickenbacker's injuries included a fractured skull, a shattered left elbow with a crushed nerve, a paralyzed left hand, several broken ribs, a crushed hip socket, a pelvis broken in two places, a severed nerve in his left hip, a broken left knee, and his left eyeball was out of its socket. He was in critical condition at Atlanta's Piedmont Hospital for ten days. After four months in the hospital, followed by months of home care, Rickenbacker healed from his injuries and regained his full eyesight. Rickenbacker later noted the supreme act of will that it took to stave off dying.

Rickenbacker was an avid golfer, often playing at the Siwanoy Country Club course near his home in Bronxville. He is one of a very select few members who were granted honorary lifetime membership. He was also a member of the Los Angeles Elks Lodge #99. After he left Eastern Airlines, the Rickenbackers traveled for several years in the Orient.

In 1972, Rickenbacker had a stroke that left him in a coma for a short time. He recovered and traveled to Zürich, Switzerland, in July 1973, seeking medical treatments for his wife's failing vision. While in Zürich, Rickenbacker contracted pneumonia and died at the age of 82. His memorial service was held at the Key Biscayne Presbyterian Church with the eulogy given by Lt. General Jimmy Doolittle. He was interred in Columbus, Ohio, at Green Lawn Cemetery. When he died, Rickenbacker was the last living Medal of Honor recipient from the United States Army Air Service.

In 1977, Adelaide was blind, in failing health, and still grieving severely from the loss of her husband. She died by suicide via gunshot at their home in Key Biscayne, Florida, at the age of 92.

== Awards and honors ==
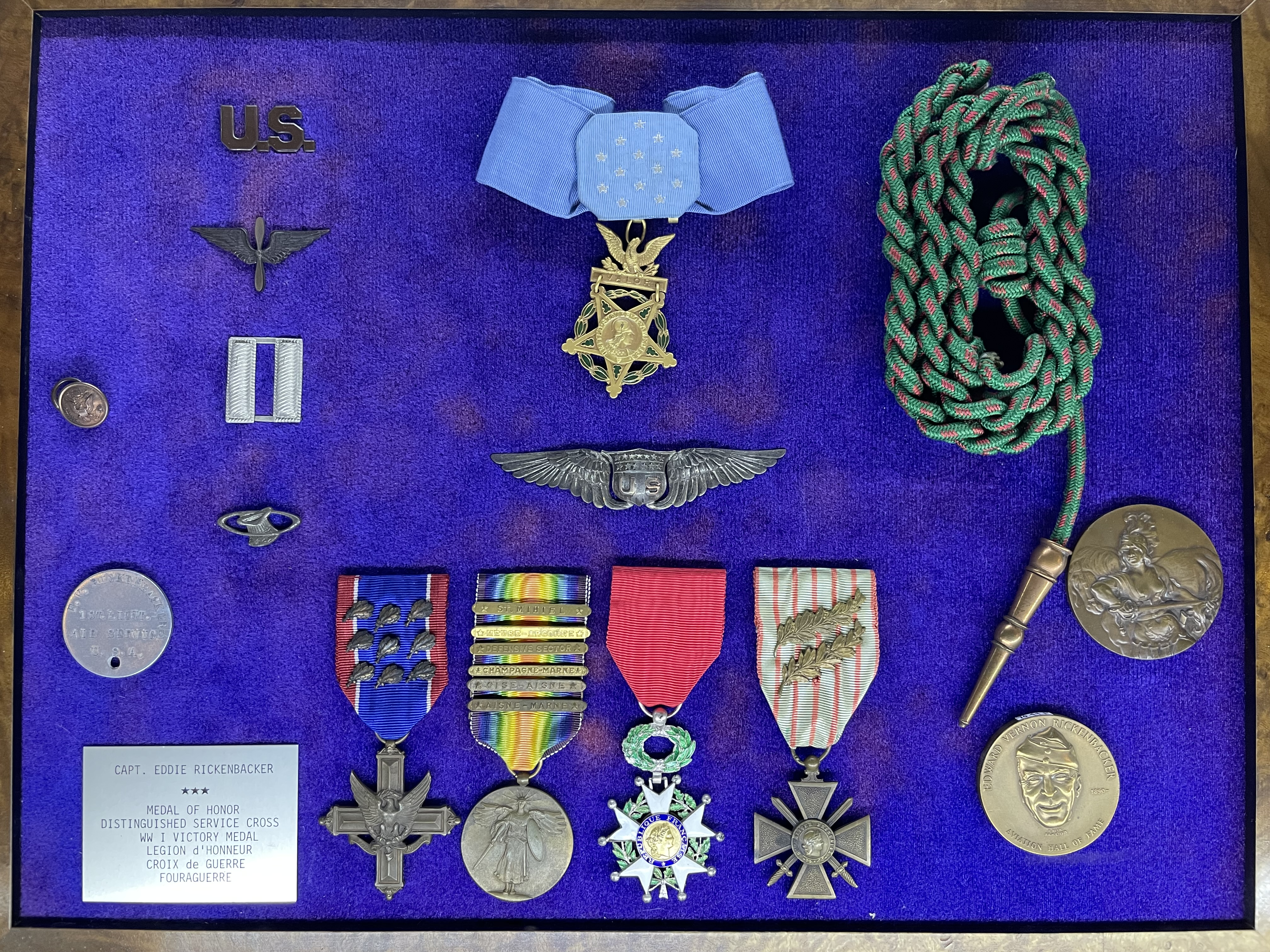
Rickenbacker's medals at the San Diego Air & Space Museum

=== Military awards ===
- Junior Military Aviation Badge
- Mackay Trophy for bringing down sixteen enemy aircraft, 1918
- Croix de Guerre with Palm from France in May 1918
- Legion of Honor (Chevalier) from France in May 1918
- Distinguished Service Cross for service near Billy, France on September 25, 1918 (replaced by a Medal of Honor in 1930)
- Distinguished Service Cross for heroism near Montsec, France on April 29, 1918
- Distinguished Service Cross Oak Leaf Cluster for heroic action over Richecourt, France on May 17, 1918
- Distinguished Service Cross Oak Leaf Cluster for heroism over Saint-Mihiel, France on May 22, 1918
- Distinguished Service Cross Oak Leaf Cluster for heroism in action over Boise Rate, France on May 28, 1918
- Distinguished Service Cross Oak Leaf Cluster for heroism in action at 4,000 meters (13,000 ft) over Jaulny, France on May 30, 1918
- Distinguished Service Cross Oak Leaf Cluster for heroism in action near Villecy, France on September 14, 1918
- Distinguished Service Cross Oak Leaf Cluster for action in the region of Bois-de-Wavrille, France, September 15, 1918
- World War I Victory Medal with six battle clasps
- Medal of Honor awarded on November 6, 1930, for service near Billy, France on September 25, 1918 (replaced his first Distinguished Service Cross)

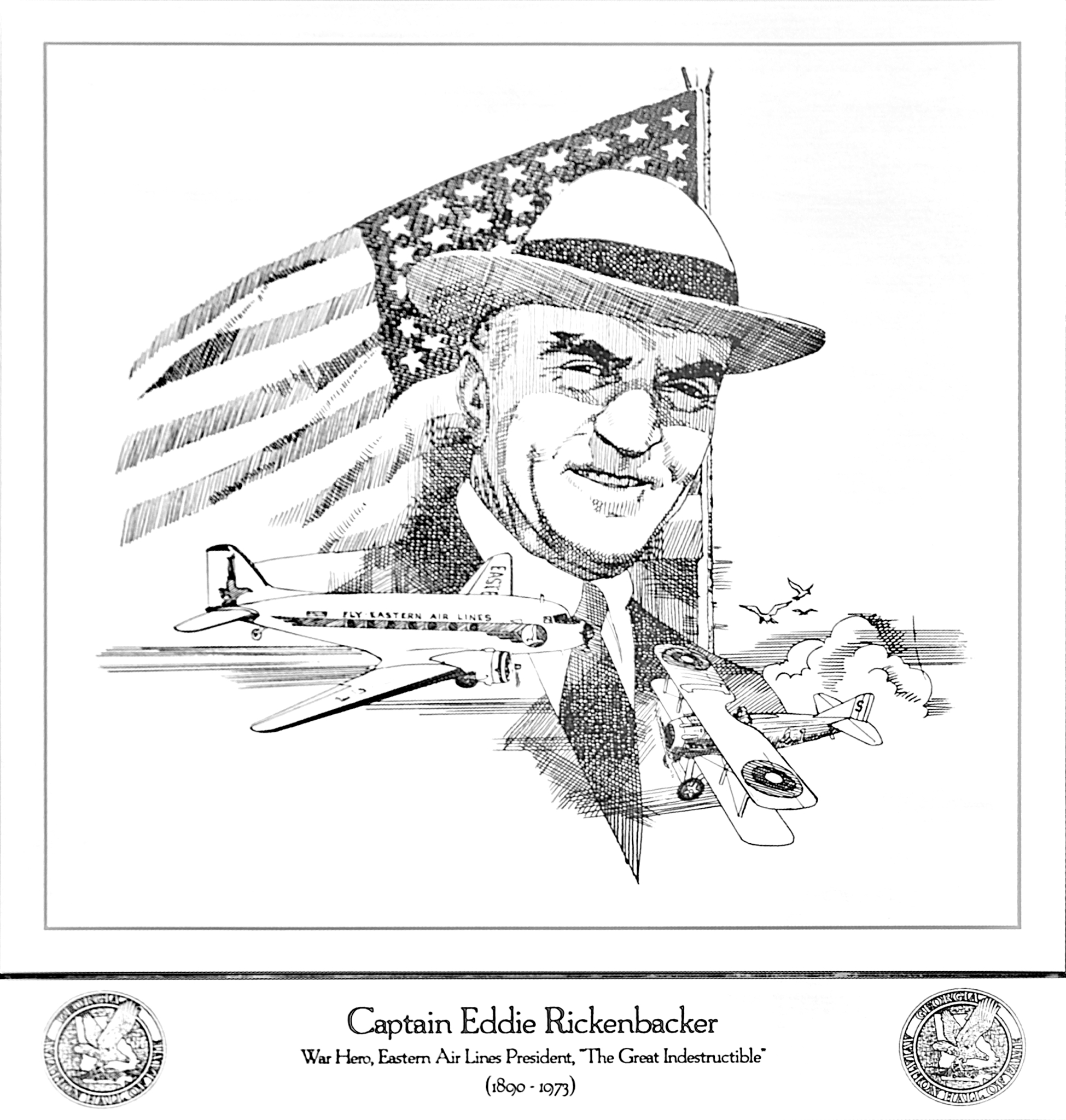
Plaque honoring Rickenbacker at the Georgia Aviation Hall of Fame

=== Other awards ===
- Medal for Merit for efforts as a civilian during World War II
- Veterans of Foreign Wars Merit Award, 1953
- Indianapolis Motor Speedway Hall of Fame, 1954
- Tony Jannus Award, 1967
- Automotive Hall of Fame, 1973
- International Motorsports Hall of Fame, 1992
- National Sprint Car Hall of Fame, 1992
- Motorsports Hall of Fame of America, 1994
- Georgia Aviation Hall of Fame, 1999
- National Aviation Hall of Fame, 2004

=== Other honors ===
- When it opened in 1941, Dobbins Air Reserve Base in Georgia was originally called Rickenbacker Field, in his honor.
- In November 1947, a four-mile (6.4 km) Rickenbacker Causeway was completed, linking Miami with Crandon Park with Key Biscayne.
- He was made an honorary brother of the Alpha Pi Sigma fraternity in March 1949 at Parks Air College in Cahokia, Illinois.
- In 1974, Lockbourne Air Force Base, a Strategic Air Command (SAC) installation in Columbus, Ohio was renamed Rickenbacker Air Force Base. On April 1, 1980, it was turned over to the Ohio Air National Guard and renamed Rickenbacker Air National Guard Base which shares an airfield with Rickenbacker International Airport.
- Rickenbacker ANGB Composite Squadron, a Civil Air Patrol unit based at Rickenbacker Air National Guard Base in Columbus, Ohio, traces its lineage to the former Capt. Eddie Rickenbacker Composite Squadron (OH-115) and Rickenbacker ANGB Composite Squadron in Lancaster, Ohio (OH-210) which merged in 2023. All three squadrons have been named in Rickenbacker's honor.
- The Rickenbacker Award is the Civil Air Patrol cadet achievement equivalent to an Air Force Technical Sergeant.
- The United States Postal Service issued a postage stamp honoring Rickenbacker as an aviation pioneer in 1995. The stamp was reprinted in 1999 and reissued in 2000.
- A coffee shop and deli located at Maxwell Air Force Base's University Inn is called Rickenbacker's.
- Rickenbacker was named as the class exemplar at the United States Air Force Academy for the Class of 2004.
- His childhood home in Columbus, Ohio is listed on the National Register of Historic Places as the Captain Edward V. Rickenbacker House.

== Pop culture references ==
- Co-founded in 1931 by a second cousin, Adolph Rickenbacker, Rickenbacker Guitars was given its name because of its association with the already famous Eddie Rickenbacker.
- The 1945 biographical movie, Captain Eddie, starred Fred MacMurray as Rickenbacker.
- The story of Eddie Rickenbacker "and his courageous company" appears in Twelve Steps and Twelve Traditions, the 1953 book from Alcoholics Anonymous. It pertains to when his plane crashed in the Pacific and is used in the closing remarks of Tradition One: "Our common welfare should come first; personal recovery depends upon A.A. unity."
- In the 1955 film The Court-Martial of Billy Mitchell, Rickenbacker is played by Tom Mckee.
- In the 1959 television show, The Twilight Zone episode "The Parallel", in a parallel universe, Rickenbacker was never found after the B-17 incident.
- In the early 1960s, Al Capp included an airplane pilot, Cap'n Eddie Ricketyback, in his comic strip Li'l Abner.
- In a 1960s Peanuts comic strip, Lucy tells Snoopy that he received a postcard from Charlie Brown who is on vacation. Snoopy imagines that the message was sent from Captain Eddie Rickenbacker claiming that "Rick will never amount to much...Those racing drivers don't know anything about flying airplanes."
- The 1975 children's television series Fraidy Cat stars a cat who lived his seventh life as an ace pilot named Eddie Kittenbacker, a feline caricature of Rickenbacker.
- In the pilot episode of the science fiction series Voyagers! (1982), the protagonists help Rickenbacker defeat the Red Baron.
- Eddie Rickenbacker appears in the 1990 video game Red Baron as one of the Allied aces.
- In the 1999 video game System Shock 2, a military spaceship is named the UNN Rickenbacker.
- The 2004 board game Wings of War: Famous Aces features Rickenbacker's Spad XIII.
- In the 2004 novel The Godfather Returns, Nick Geraci is reading Eddie Rickenbacker's autobiography. His father quotes from the sleeve of the book.
- Rickenbacker is an instructor in the World War I simulation game Rise of Flight, released in 2009.
- In the 2007 documentary The King of Kong: A Fistful of Quarters, Billy Mitchell compares Eddie Rickenbacker with the Red Baron to illustrate his dominance of competitive video gaming. He says, "The top French pilot in World War I shot down 24 enemy planes. The top American pilot—you don't know his name, do you? Nobody does, but it's Eddie Rickenbacker. Shot down 26 enemy planes. The German Ace, the Red Baron—everyone knows who the Red Baron is. That's 'cause he shot down 87 enemy planes. I mean, he was the best...There's a level of difference between people, and it translates into some games."
- In 2009, musician Todd Snider wrote a song called "Money, Compliments, and Publicity," which revolves around a statement Rickenbacker made indicating that the pinnacle of success is when you lose interest in money, compliments, and publicity.
- In the 2017 film Wonder Woman, the fictional pilot/spy Steve Trevor has Rickenbacker's logo and number on his plane.

== Publications ==
- Fighting the Flying Circus. New York: Frederick A. Stokes, 1919
- Ace Drummond (Big Little Book no. 1177). Racine, Wisconsin: Whitman Publishing Company, 1935
- Hall of Fame of the Air (Big Little Book no. 1159). Racine, Wisconsin: Whitman Publishing Company, 1936.
- Seven Came Through. Garden City: Doubleday, Doran and Company, Inc., 1943
- Rickenbacker: An Autobiography. Englewood Cliffs: Prentice-Hall, Inc., 1967. ISBN 978-0-13-781005-5
- From Father to Son: The Letters of Captain Eddie Rickenbacker to His Son William, from Boyhood to Manhood. William Rickenbacker, ed. New York: Walker & Co, 1970. ISBN 978-0-8027-0325-5
- Fighter Pilot: The Combat Memoir of Eddie Rickenbacker (Modern Annotated Edition). Laurence La Tourette Driggs and David W. Bradford, ed. Boston Hill Press, 2015. ASIN B016FZ6JTY

== See also ==
- List of Medal of Honor recipients for World War I
- List of members of the American Legion
- List of World War I flying aces from the United States
