= Captain Edward V. Rickenbacker House =

Historic house in Columbus, Ohio, United States

- U.S. National Register of Historic Places
- U.S. National Historic Landmark
- Columbus Register of Historic Properties
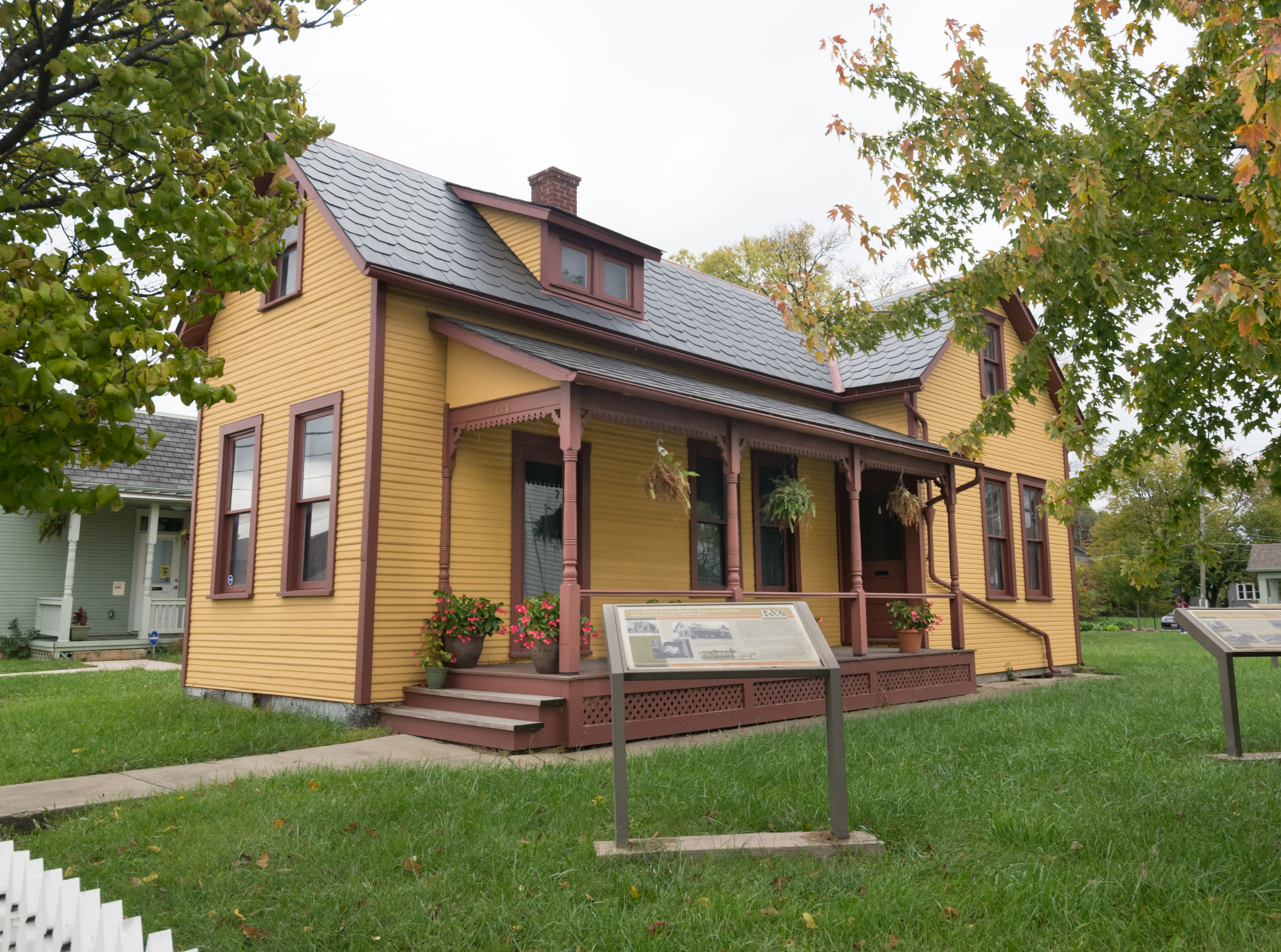
- Interactive map highlighting the building's location
- Location: 1334 East Livington Avenue, Columbus, Ohio
- Coordinates: 39°56′58″N 82°57′44″W
- Area: 1 acre (0.40 ha)
- Built: 1895
- Architect: William Rickenbacker
- NRHP reference No.: 76001426
- CRHP No.: CR-28

Significant dates
- Added to NRHP: May 11, 1976
- Designated NHL: May 11, 1976
- Designated CRHP: May 14, 1984

The Edward V. Rickenbacker House is a historic house in the Driving Park neighborhood of Columbus, Ohio. Built in 1895, it was the childhood home of Eddie Rickenbacker (1890–1973), who at various times in his life was a flying ace, Medal of Honor recipient, race car driver and a pioneer in air transportation. The house was designated a National Historic Landmark in 1976.

== Description and history ==
The Edward V. Rickenbacker House is located on the north side of East Livingston Avenue (United States Route 33), between Miller Avenue and Lockbourne Road. The house is a 1½ story frame structure with a shingle roof. The house has a gable roof with a shed dormer. Windows are one-over-one sashes. Access to the cellar is through an exterior metal bulkhead door on a concrete base; the concrete bears the initials "E.V.R." The house interior comprises three rooms on the first floor and two in the attic. A one-story shed on the property dates to the Rickenbacker occupancy.

The first portion of the house was built between 1893 and 1895 by Rickenbacker's father, William, with two rooms on the main floor and two attic rooms. About 1900 William and Eddie Rickenbacker built an ell to the north, over a cellar. Eddie grew up in this house, and it was his nominal residence during World War I until he rented an apartment in 1922 with his wife. Eddie paid off the mortgage on the house after his father's death, and it remained in the family until about 1960, the residence of Eddie's sister Mary.

The house was purchased by the city in 1998, when it was in poor condition, with the intent of making it the centerpiece of a museum that would revitalize the area. The effort had faltered by 2009, after some rehabilitation had been made to the house. The effort has since been taken over by a nonprofit organization, the Rickenbacker Woods Foundation. The foundation aims to open a museum focusing on the life of Eddie Rickenbacker and the history of the surrounding Driving Park neighborhood.

== See also ==
- List of National Historic Landmarks in Ohio
- National Register of Historic Places listings in Columbus, Ohio
