= Cléry-le-Petit =

- Commune
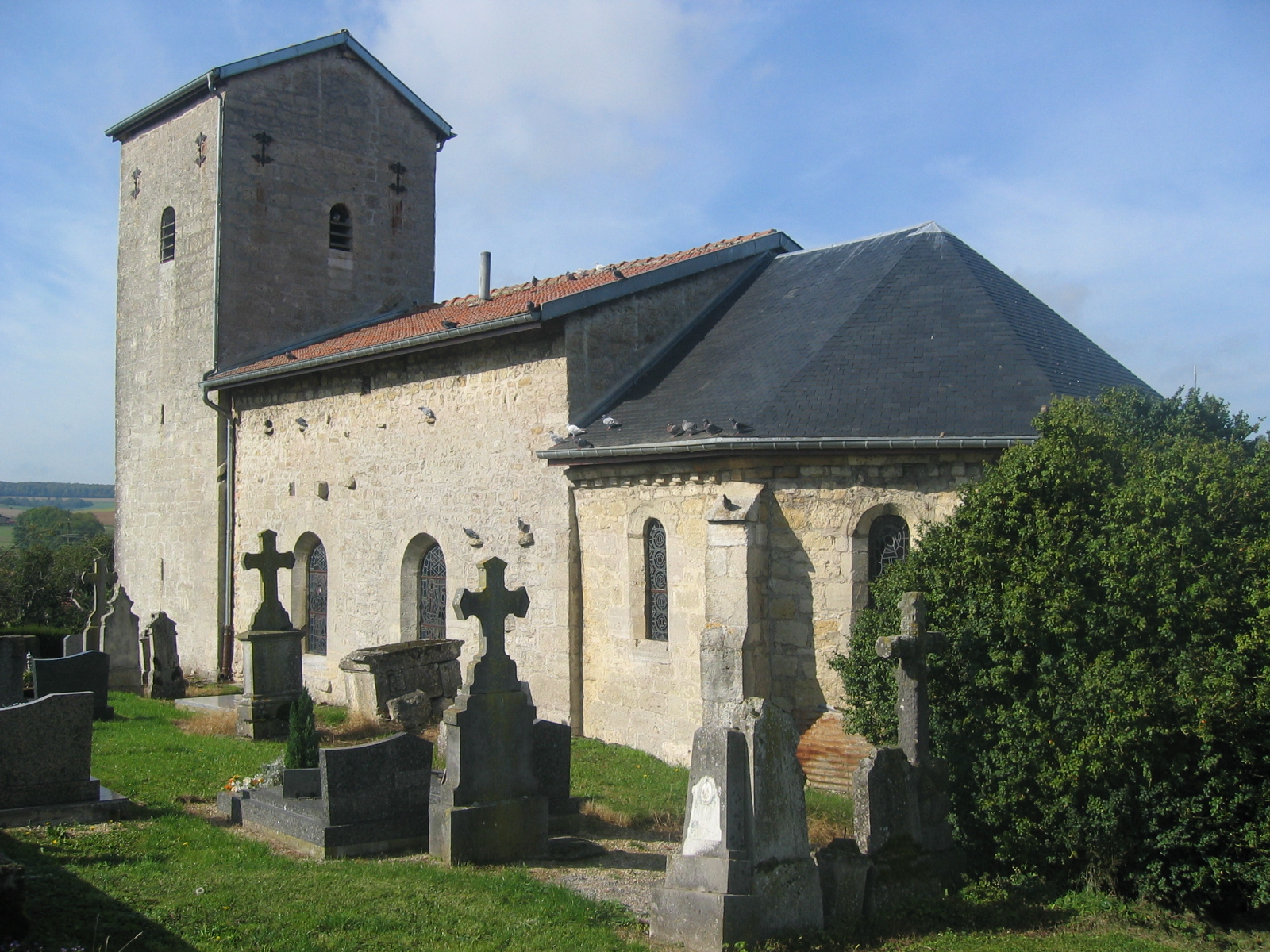
- The church in Cléry-le-Petit

- Coat of arms
- Location of Cléry-le-Petit
- Location within France Location within Grand Est
- Coordinates: 49°22′05″N 5°10′49″E
- Country: France
- Region: Grand Est
- Department: Meuse
- Arrondissement: Verdun
- Canton: Stenay
- Intercommunality: CC du Pays de Stenay et du Val Dunois

Government
  - Mayor (2020–2026): Pascal Humbert
- Area^{1}: 4.58 km^{2} (1.77 sq mi)
- Elevation: 200 m (660 ft)
- Highest elevation: 273 m (896 ft)
- Lowest elevation: 172 m (564 ft)
- Population (2023): 183
  - Density: 40.0/km^{2} (103/sq mi)
- Time zone: UTC+01:00 (CET)
  - Summer (DST): UTC+02:00 (CEST)
- INSEE/Postal code: 55119 /55110
- ^{1} French Land Register data, which excludes lakes, ponds, glaciers > 1 km^{2} (0.386 sq mi or 247 acres) and river estuaries.

Cléry-le-Petit (French pronunciation: [kleʁi lə pəti]) is a commune in the Meuse department in Grand Est in north-eastern France.

== See also ==
- Communes of the Meuse department
