= Oscar Lear Automobile Company =

Defunct American motor vehicle manufacturer

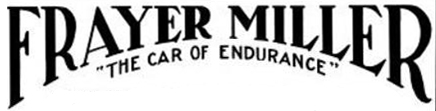
- Type: Automobile Manufacturing
- Industry: Automotive
- Genre: Touring cars
- Founded: 1904
- Founder: Oscar Lear, Lee A. Frayer and William J. Miller
- Defunct: 1910
- Headquarters: Columbus, Ohio, Springfield, Ohio, United States
- Area served: United States
- Products: Vehicles; Automotive parts

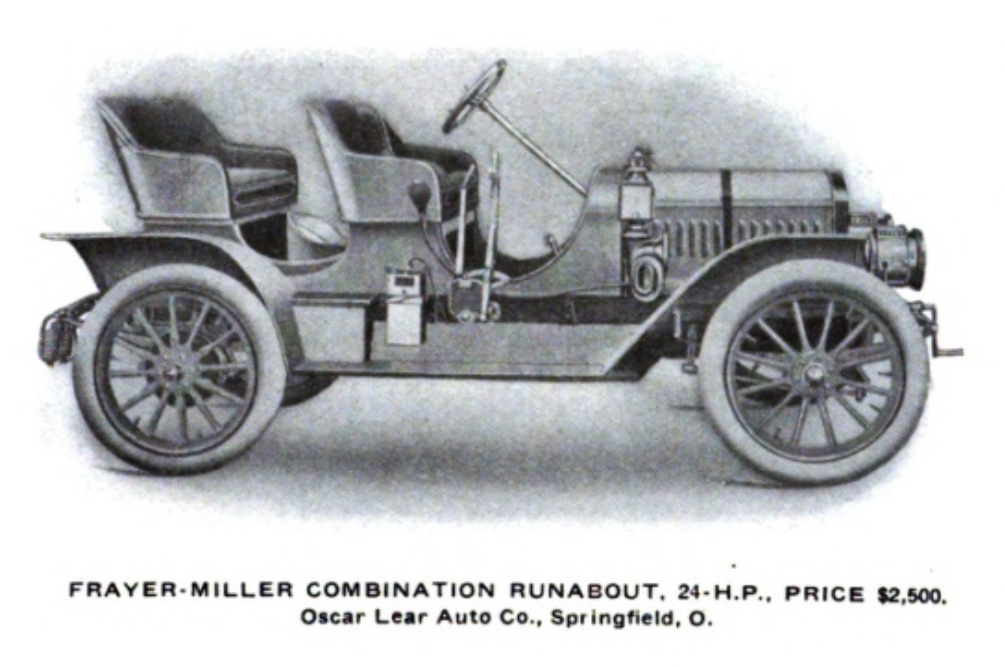
Frayer-Miller Combination Runabout (1908)

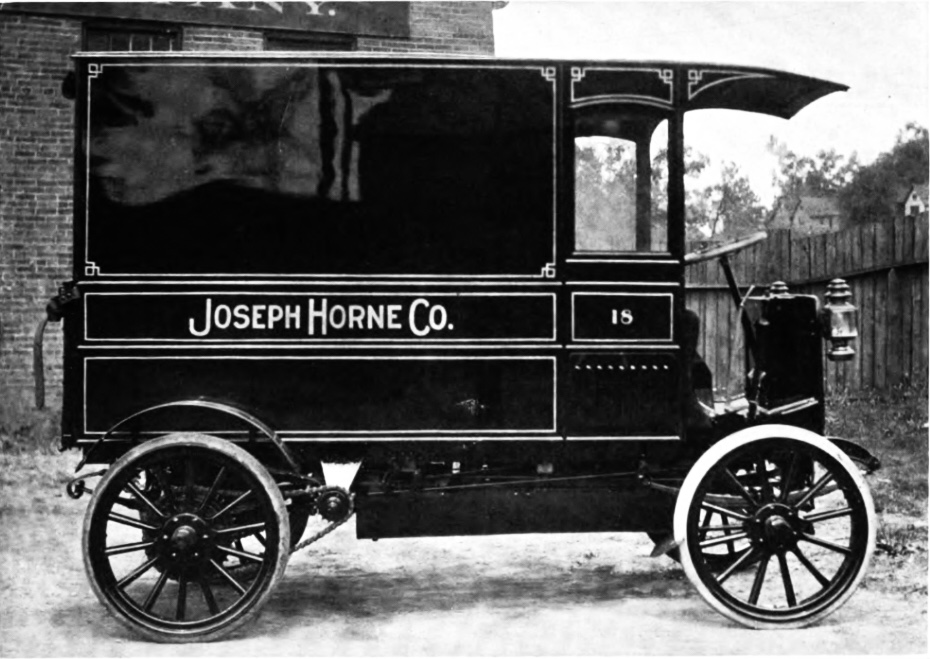
Frayer-Miller 4354 cc Motor (1908)

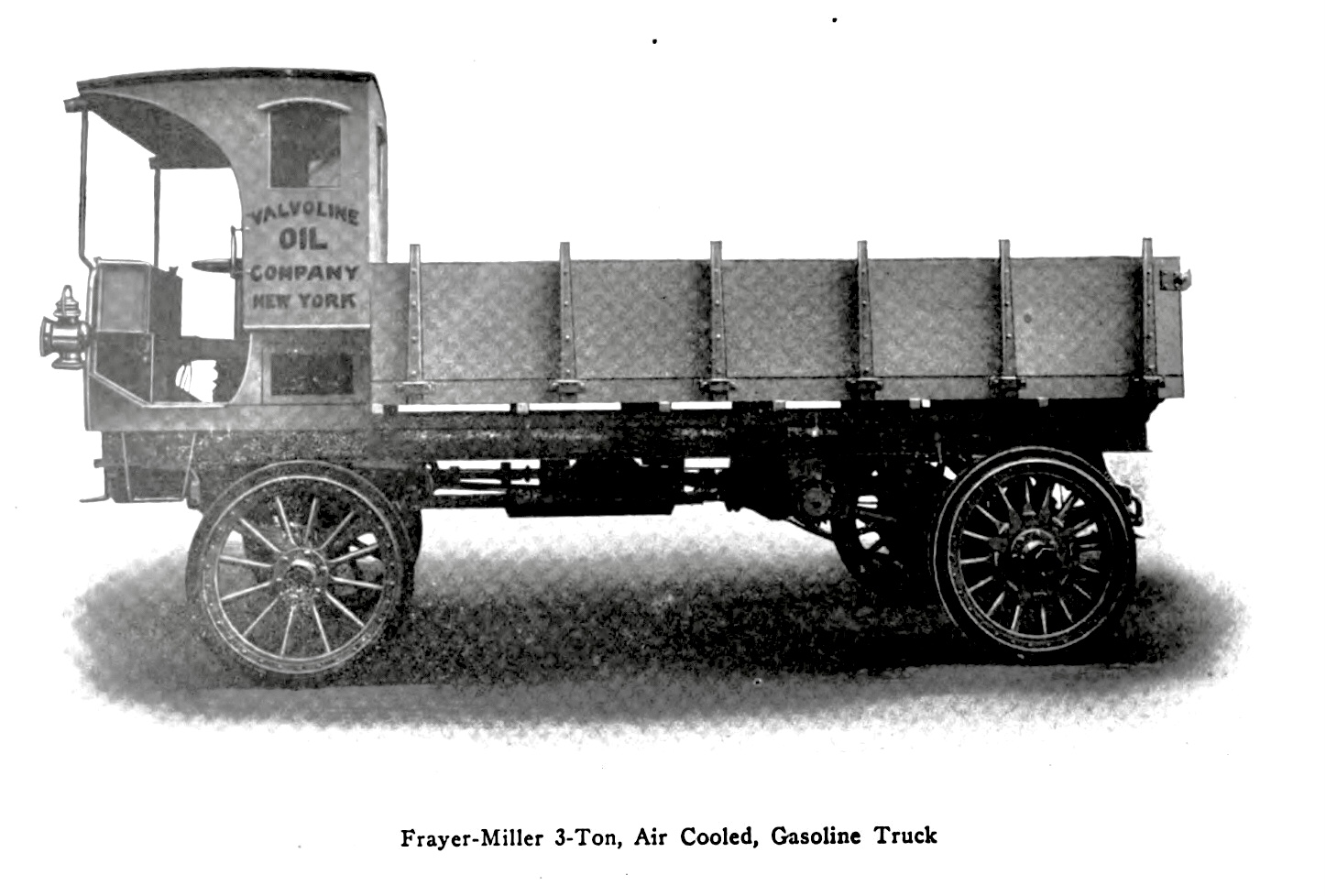
Frayer-Miller 3 t Truck (1908)

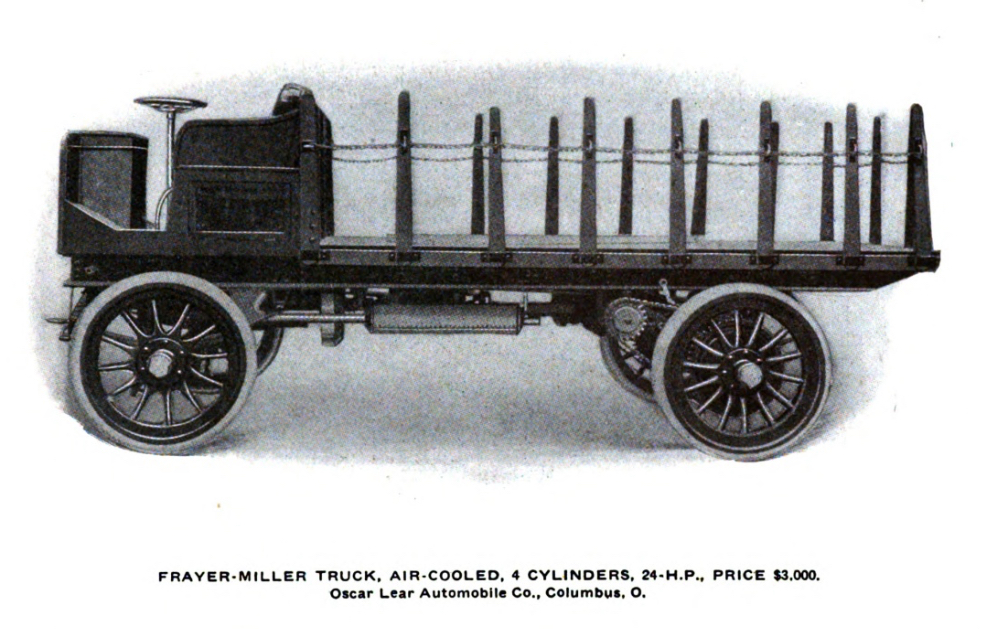
Frayer-Miller Truck 24 hp (1908)

Frayer-Miller Race car

Frayer-Miller was built by the Oscar Lear Automobile Company in Columbus, Ohio and advertised as "the car of endurance." It had a distinctive air-cooled engine. The car was manufactured between the years of 1904 and 1910.

== Advertisements ==
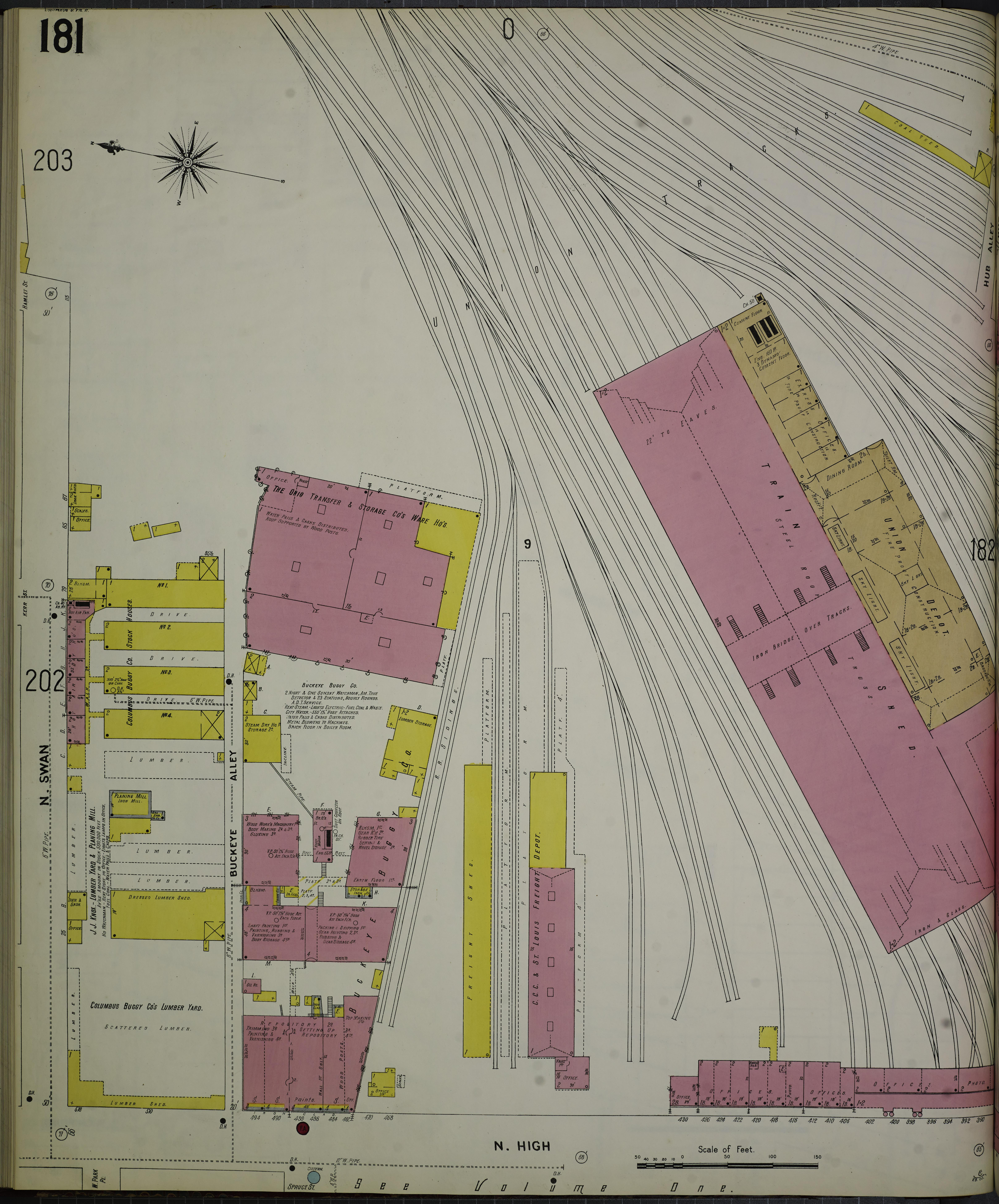
Oscar Lear Automobile Company plant (1901) Buckeye Buggy Co.

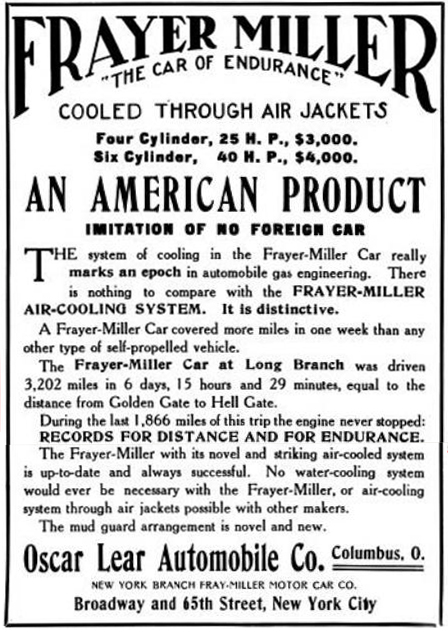
Frayer-Miller - Oscar Lear Automobile Co. of Columbus, Ohio - 1906

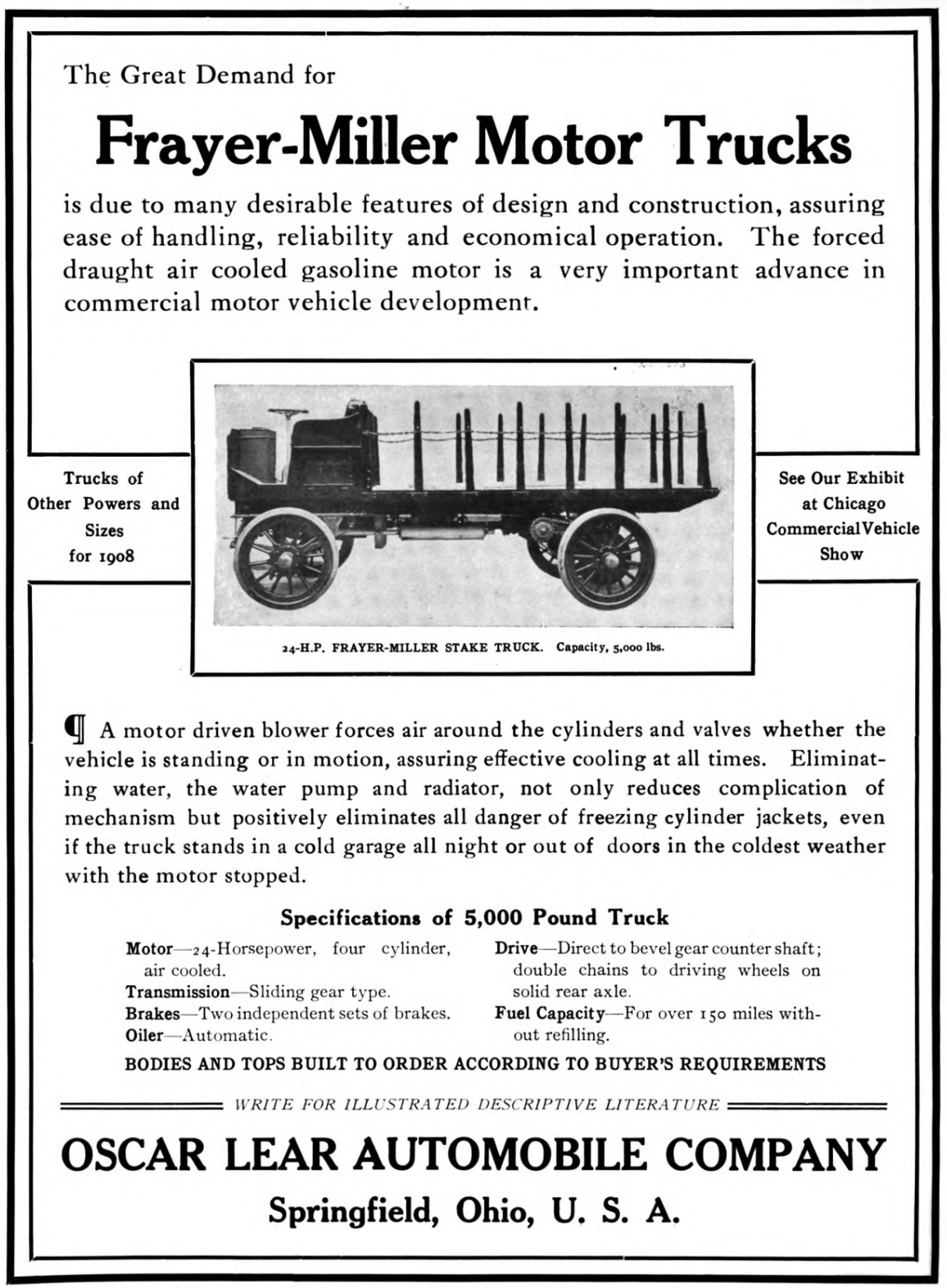
Frayer Miller Trucks (1907)

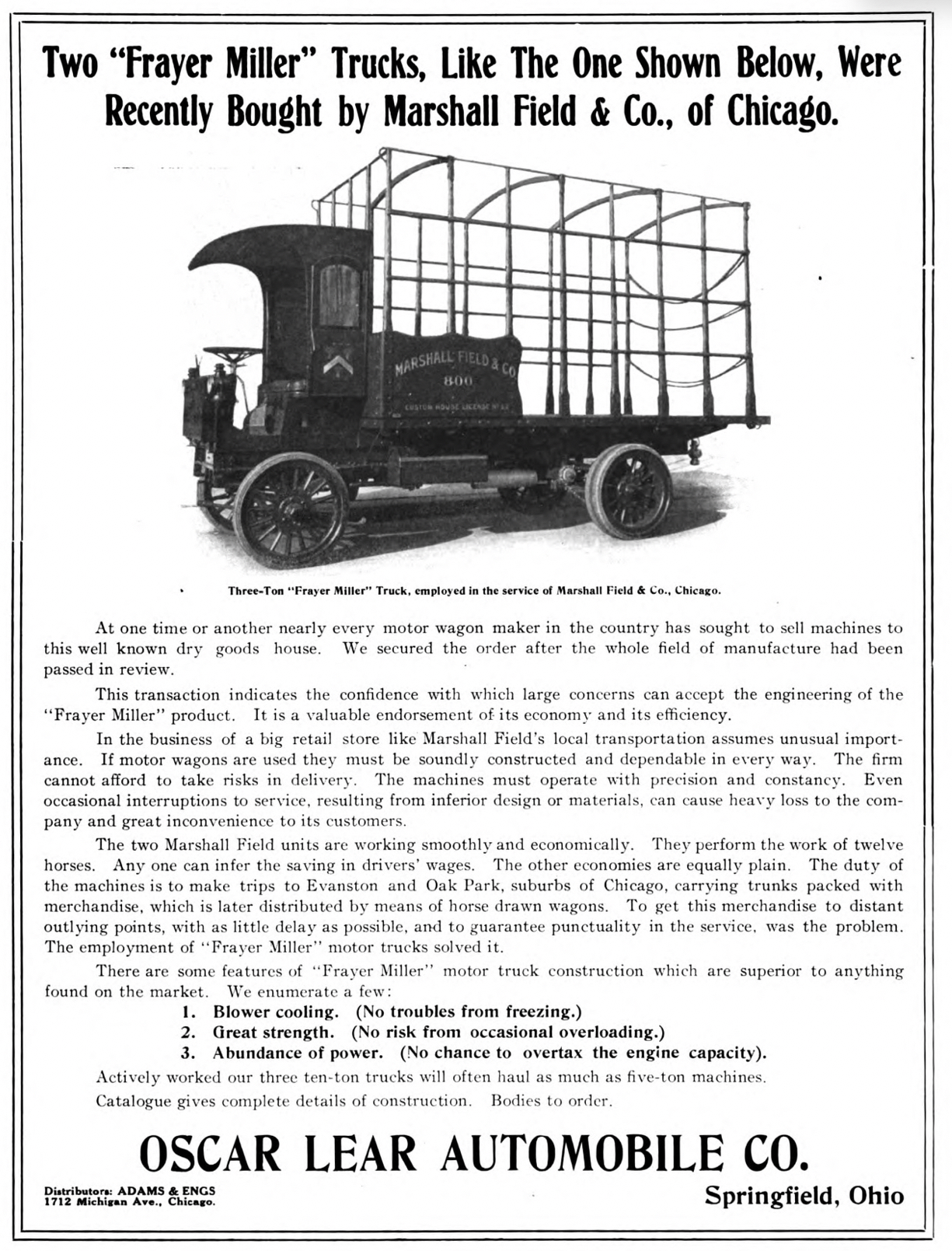
Frayer Miller Trucks (1909)

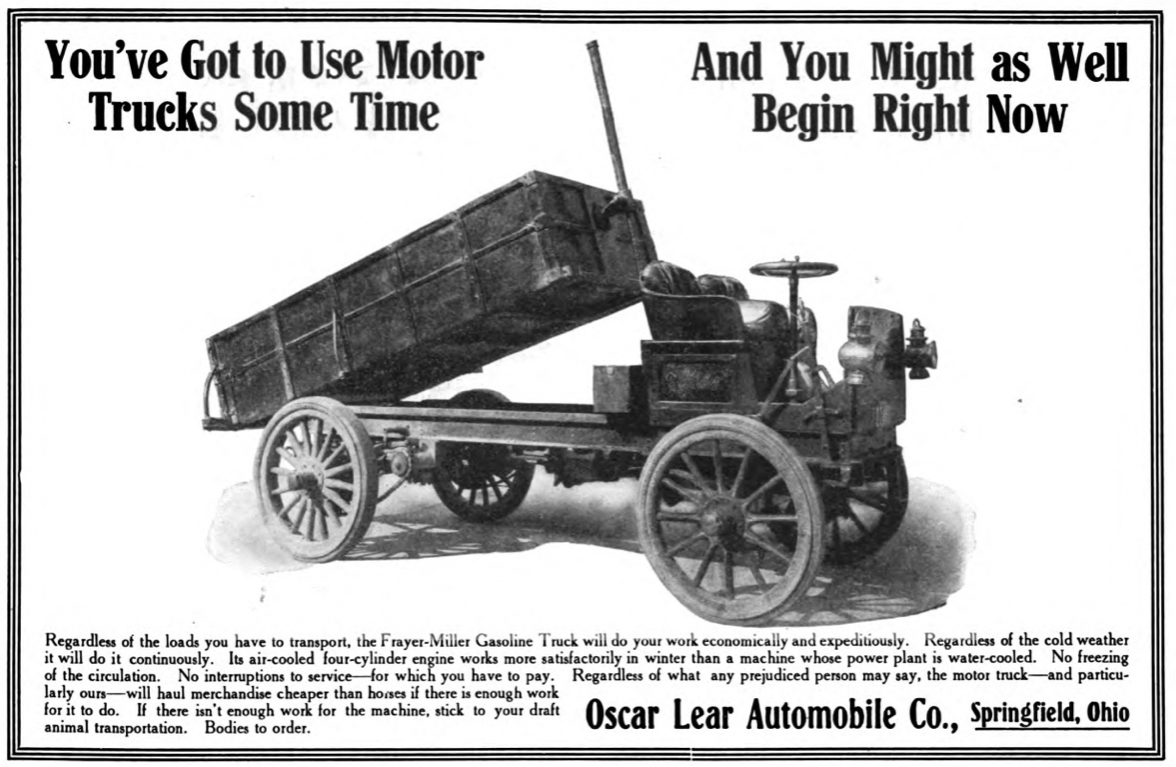
Frayer-Miller Trucks (1908)
