= A. B. Graham =

Albert Belmont (A.B.) Graham
- Born: March 13, 1868; Champaign County, Ohio, US
- Died: January 14, 1960 (aged 91); Columbus, Ohio, US
- Known for: Founder of 4-H program in the United States

Albert Belmont (A.B.) Graham (1868-1960) was an American educator and early leader of the Cooperative Extension System. He is widely regarded as the founder of 4-H, the largest youth development organization in the United States.

== Biography ==
=== Early life ===
Graham was born on a farm in Champaign County, Ohio, on March 13, 1868 to parents Joseph Archibald Graham and Esther Reed Graham. At the age of 11, Graham suffered the loss of both his father and his family’s home due to a fire. Following this tragedy, the Graham family relocated to Lima in Allen County, Ohio, where Graham spent his teenage years. In 1885, Graham was a member of the first graduating class of Lena Conover High School in Miami County, Ohio.

At the age of sixteen, Graham was awarded a teaching certificate in Miami County and his certification was soon extended to Champaign County. Between 1885 and 1887, Graham worked as a high school teacher in Johnson Township School District in Champaign County Ohio. Graham subsequently attended the National Normal School in Lebanon, Ohio. He was awarded a Bachelor of Science degree in 1888. He then attended Ohio State University from 1889-1890. Graham married Maud Keyte Lauer in 1890. They had five children, including one who died in infancy.

=== Career ===
Graham continued his work as a high school teacher from 1890 to 1896, teaching at multiple schools within Shelby, Miami, and Champaign counties. In 1896, Graham was hired as principal at Terre Haute School in Champaign County. He simultaneously served as Superintendent of the Southern Mad River Township, also in Champaign County. Graham occupied these roles until 1900, at which point the Graham family relocated to Springfield Township in Clark County, Ohio.

In 1900, Graham was appointed Superintendent of Schools for Springfield Township. In this position, Graham dedicated his efforts to studying the present challenges within rural education. Graham believed that rural youth needed more opportunities for practical learning experiences in agriculture and science. He also felt it was important to restore young people’s pride in farming as a profession and way of life.

As a result, in early 1902, Graham created a club for youth ages 10-15 in his community called the Boys’ and Girls’ Agriculture Experiment Club. Some sources alternatively suggest that the club was named “The Tomato Club” or “The Corn Growing Club." In order to attract members, Graham traveled to various schools within the Springfield Township school district and delivered presentations about his vision for the club. He successfully recruited 85 students. The first meeting of the Boys’ and Girls’ Agriculture Experiment Club was held on January 15, 1902.

Club meetings were held once a month on Saturday afternoons in the basement of the Clark County Court House. Graham deliberately held the club in a non-school setting to make clear that its activities were separate from those of the local school. Through his club, Graham sought to prepare young people with an awareness of how the agricultural industry operates, and to instill a strong sense of character within his students that allowed them to understand the importance of hard work.

Graham adopted a “learning by doing” approach within his club. Students received instruction in growing various crops, such as corn, potatoes, and tomatoes, and then practiced their newfound skills using experimental gardening plots. Students also studied weeds and seeds, tested local soils for acidity, and spent time observing birds. Graham often employed the nature study method within his club. Club members also prepared exhibits for display at farmers’ institutes.

Graham’s work garnered attention from Ohio State University in 1903, establishing a partnership between Graham’s agricultural clubs and the university’s agricultural college. On July 1, 1905, Graham was appointed as the first Superintendent of Agricultural Extension at Ohio State University. As Superintendent, Graham traveled to rural communities throughout Ohio to encourage educational reform. In his position, Graham authored many Extension bulletins about agriculture, nature study, and rural life. He was an advocate for rural school reform, and contributed significantly to the growth of farmers’ institutes and agricultural fairs.

Graham continued his work at Ohio State University until 1914, when he accepted a position at the New York State School of Agriculture in Farmingdale, NY. His work in New York was similar to his work in Ohio, with a strong focus on expanding Extension education programs. He resigned from this position in 1915, and was hired by the United States Department of Agriculture as a Chief Agricultural Extension Specialist. Graham served as a subject-matter specialist in the Federal Extension Service until his retirement on March 31, 1938.

=== Retirement and death ===
In total, Graham devoted more than 35 years of his career to advancing the Cooperative Extension System in the United States. He spent his retirement in Clintonville, a suburb of Columbus, Ohio. He remained active in the community, often responding to correspondence from former colleagues and attending 4-H events. Graham died on January 14, 1960, at a nursing home in Columbus, Ohio, two weeks after he had a stroke at his home. He is buried in Fletcher Cemetery in Miami County, Ohio.

== Legacy ==
Graham High School in St. Paris, Ohio, was named in his honor, and he attended its first graduation ceremony in 1958.

His Columbus, Ohio house, the A.B. Graham House, was listed on the National Register of Historic Places in 2015.
