= Cooperative Extension System (United States) =

US education system

- Formation: 1914
- Type: Federally supported educational and agricultural extension network
- Headquarters: Washington, D.C., U.S.
- Region served: United States
- Parent organization: National Institute of Food and Agriculture (United States Department of Agriculture)
- Website: nifa.usda.gov

The Cooperative Extension System (CES) is a nationwide publicly funded informal education system in the United States. CES programs are administered by land-grant universities in collaboration with federal, state, and local governments. CES was formally established by the Smith-Lever Act of 1914.

CES supports and delivers community education programs in subject areas such as agriculture, health and nutrition, family and consumer sciences, community development, natural resources, emergency preparedness, climate, volunteerism, and human sciences. CES also oversees 4-H, the largest youth development organization in the United States.

CES operates at the federal level through the National Institute of Food and Agriculture (NIFA), an agency under the United States Department of Agriculture (USDA). State-level leadership is provided by land-grant universities, and local programming is facilitated by county-level offices.

== Structure and organization ==
CES operates as a partnership between federal, state, and local agencies. Each level of leadership performs unique functions that are essential to the overall operation of CES.

Federal oversight is provided by the National Institute of Food and Agriculture under the United States Department of Agriculture. NIFA is responsible for supporting national-level programming, administering formula-based funding, and ensuring compliance with federal regulations.

At the state level, each state's land-grant university (or multiple universities if applicable) oversees the state Extension administration. State Extension leaders and Extension specialists translate campus-based research into curricula, develop statewide programs, provide technical expertise, and support county Extension offices. States also provide substantial funding to Extension programs and establish statewide priorities.

Local programming is overseen by city or county governments, and implemented by county Extension offices, Extension agents, and volunteers. Local offices are responsible for identifying and responding to the unique needs of local communities. Local Extension programming may include 4-H clubs, farm and business outreach, family and consumer science programs, and community development activities.

Beyond the administrative structure, CES serve as a bridge between university research and everyday community needs, helping people apply practical, science based solutions in Agriculture, youth development, health and family-life.

== Programs and areas of focus ==
CES supports programs in four main areas: family and consumer sciences, 4-H youth development, community and economic development, and agriculture and natural resources.

=== Family and consumer sciences ===
Extension programs in family and consumer sciences (FCS) focus on issues of domestic and family life, such as health and wellness, child and family development, rural health and safety, adult development and aging, and workforce development. FCS programs seek to promote well-being and maximize socio-economic potential within communities. Many FCS programs focus on improving public health, promoting healthy lifestyles, and reducing diet-related diseases. These programs are designed to equip participants with the motivation and knowledge necessary to implement healthy habits. Extension programs in FCS target multiple populations, including low-income families, aging adults, and parents.

- The Expanded Food and Nutrition Education Program (EFNEP) is designed to improve nutrition and health among low-income families and youth in the United States. EFNEP programs provide hands-on nutrition education to help participants improve the quality of their diets, manage food resources, practice safe food handling, and increase physical activity.
- SNAP-Ed programs provide educational outreach to individuals and families who are eligible for the federal Supplemental Nutrition Assistance Program (SNAP). SNAP-Ed aims to reduce nutrition insecurity and promote overall health and well-being among SNAP-eligible populations. The program focuses on improving dietary habits, increasing physical activity, and promoting healthy choices.

=== 4-H youth development ===
4-H is a youth development program overseen by NIFA under USDA. 4-H programs are designed to promote the development of leadership, civic engagement, and life skills among youth. Today, 4-H is the largest youth development organization in the United States with over six million members. 4-H clubs are supported by a network of over 500,000 adult volunteers nationwide. 4-H programs primarily provide educational opportunities for youth in four national focus areas: STEM, agriculture, civic engagement, and healthy living. The name '4-H' refers to four core values that the program seeks to develop in its members: Head, Heart, Hands, and Health.

==== Creation of 4-H in the United States ====
4-H was created in response to increasing urbanization in the early 1900s, which led to social and cultural shifts in rural America. Young people were increasingly uninterested in pursuing farming as a profession. 4-H was developed as a way to reengage rural youth with agriculture. It sought to provide young people with a sense of purpose and pride in rural life while also preparing them to embrace modern science and technology in the farming process.

In 1902, A. B. Graham founded a youth club in Clark County, Ohio, to teach young people about growing corn and tomatoes. Although the name “4-H” was not adopted until 1910, this is widely recognized as the first 4-H club. By 1910, almost 100,000 youth nationwide were participating in 4-H clubs. Early 4-H clubs provided instruction to rural youth in topics like growing corn, raising hogs, and canning food.

==== Positive Youth Development ====
4-H youth development programs are designed in alignment with Positive Youth Development (PYD) frameworks. PYD is a theory of youth development that focuses on experiential, relational, and environmental factors to promote positive developmental outcomes among young people. The Five C’s Model of Positive Youth Development is often used to define the intended developmental outcomes of PYD programs. The 5 C’s model suggests that when high levels of competence, confidence, character, caring, and connection are cultivated among young people, they will be able to meaningfully contribute to their communities.

=== Community and economic development ===
Extension programs in the area of Community and Economic Development aim to strengthen local economies, improve quality of life, and promote civic engagement. Extension initiatives focus on a wide range of issues, including small business development, workforce training, digital skills education, housing and health care access, financial literacy, and community leadership. Extension programs assist communities in responding to economic, demographic, and environmental challenges like population decline, loss of farmland, and natural disasters like droughts, floods, and wildfires.

- Stronger Economies Together (SET) is a national initiative designed to help rural communities strengthen their regional economic development. SET programs promote regional collaboration, asset-based development, data-driven planning, and capacity building in rural communities. SET has been implemented in 32 states, reaching over 80 multi-county regions.

=== Agriculture and natural resources ===
Many Extension programs focus on strengthening the U.S. food supply by promoting research and innovations in farming, food processing, and distribution. It aims to increase domestic food production, reduce waste, improve nutrition, and enhance food safety. Extension also emphasizes supporting local and regional markets and supply chains. Programs also provide training to students and 4-H members in agricultural skills to prepare young people for careers in sustainable agriculture.

Extension’s programs help communities respond to extreme weather events or climate variations by promoting the responsible use of natural resources. Extreme weather and environmental degradation threaten food security, ecosystem health, and the economic stability of rural and urban communities. In response to this threat, Extension programs promote soil health, water conservation, biodiversity, climate-smart forestry, and agricultural practices that reduce greenhouse gas emissions.

Extension programs seek to secure and preserve the U.S. water supply to ensure reliable access to safe water for agriculture and public health. Extension programs provide guidance on water contamination source identification, water testing and treatment, and water conservation and policy. To implement water education programs, NIFA maintains a partnership with The National Drought Mitigation Center based at University of Nebraska-Lincoln.

== History ==
=== Early efforts to expand agricultural education in the U.S. ===
In his final address to Congress as President of the United States in 1796, George Washington advocated for the creation of governmental institutions to collect and spread information about agriculture. Washington stated that the success of American agriculture was fundamental to the success of both individual citizens and the nation overall.

Despite Washington’s call for formal, government-sponsored agricultural education, early initiatives in agricultural education largely consisted of agricultural societies formed by farmers, scientists, and community members. Agricultural societies emerged shortly after the American Revolution. The first agricultural society is believed to have been the Philadelphia Society for Promoting Agriculture, which was established in 1785 by Benjamin Franklin. These organizations hosted informational lectures, sponsored community fairs, and published reports about members’ agricultural accomplishments. Agricultural societies also advocated for the creation of education programs for farmers.

In the early 1800s, few efforts were made to formalize agricultural education. Many institutions of higher education were hesitant to include agriculture in their academic offerings. In response to this, multiple states passed legislation to establish state colleges of agriculture. Federal support of agricultural education remained limited for much of the early 19th century.

=== The First Morrill Act and land-grant universities ===
On December 14, 1857, Representative Justin S. Morrill of Vermont introduced a bill to Congress which would provide federal lands to each state for the establishment of agricultural colleges. The bill initially received opposition from Southern members of congress, but was eventually passed by both the House of Representatives and the Senate in 1859. However, this bill was later vetoed by President Buchanan who labeled it as an unconstitutional expansion of federal power.

Following the election of President Abraham Lincoln, Congress reintroduced and passed the Morrill Land-Grant College Act. The Morrill Act of 1862 granted each state 30,000 acres of federal land per member of Congress. States could sell this land for a profit in order to fund the creation of public colleges providing instruction in agricultural and mechanical sciences. It was signed into law by President Lincoln in 1862, establishing the United States’ first nationwide network of agricultural education institutions.

=== The Second Morrill Act and expanding educational access ===
The Second Morrill Act of 1890, introduced by Representative Justin Morrill, expanded upon the original Morrill Act of 1862 by providing federal funding to land-grant universities through annual appropriations. The Second Morrill Act also sought to prohibit racial discrimination within the land-grant university system. This legislation required that any university receiving these federal funds could not engage in racial discrimination in its admissions practices. States were required to either open their existing land-grant universities to Black students, or to establish separate land-grant colleges where Black students could pursue higher education in agricultural and mechanical sciences. This gave rise to the establishment of many historically Black colleges and universities (HBCUs), which became land-grant universities under the Second Morrill Act.

=== The early land-grant university and agricultural experiment stations ===
Enrollment in land-grant universities was initially slow, and many institutions struggled to attract students in agriculture and mechanics. At the time, scientific research in agriculture was limited. Many agricultural colleges emphasized teaching practical farming operations rather than innovative methods or the scientific study of agricultural systems.

In order to expand research in agriculture nationwide, the Hatch Act of 1887 provided annual funding to each state in order to establish an agricultural experiment station. Agricultural experiment stations conducted research in agricultural science and distributed bulletins to the public about their findings. Reports were intended to reach both academic and agricultural audiences. However, information from agricultural research remained inaccessible to many traditional farmers. Farmers often distrusted “book farming,” the practice of non-farming “experts” offering instructions on how to run a farm. Literacy rates were also low among farmers, and agricultural research was often disseminated in a written format.

=== Farmers institutes and the rise of university Extension ===
Agricultural scientists, researchers, and farmers recognized that in order to spread innovation in agriculture, stronger communication networks needed to be established. As such, many states began establishing farmers institutes in the 1860s. Farmers institutes were designed to provide accessible, local, and relevant educational programs for farmers. By 1890, twenty-six states had established farmers institutes. Many referred to farmers institutes as “movable schools,” as they were designed to travel to various communities in order to spread agricultural knowledge. Professors from universities would travel to farming communities in order to host demonstrations and lectures about agricultural science.

Seeing the success of farmers’ institutes across the U.S., many citizens pushed for continued federal investment to expand farmers’ access to agricultural education. In 1890, the American Society for the Extension of University Teaching was established. In 1891, New Jersey was the first state to begin a program of university Extension through an agricultural college at Rutgers University. Rutgers’ program offered courses to farmers in soil, crop, and animal sciences. In the same year, New York State appropriated $10,000 towards their own university Extension efforts. Many states began to introduce their own variations of university-based agricultural Extension in the years following.

At the turn of the century, local communities across the United States were beginning to organize their own agricultural Extension efforts, drawing attention from the federal government. In 1903, the USDA established the Office of Farmers’ Cooperative Demonstration Work, which was overseen by Seaman A. Knapp. The county agent system originated within this office. County agents worked directly with farmers to demonstrate new agricultural methods and share research-based knowledge from land-grant universities.

=== Roosevelt's Country Life Commission and the Smith-Lever Act of 1914 ===
At the beginning of the 20th century, the U.S. was undergoing significant industrialization and urbanization. Many young people were leaving farming communities for urban areas, which was concerning to policymakers who saw rural communities as the moral and economic foundation of the nation overall. In 1908, President Theodore Roosevelt created the Country Life Commission. The Commission was tasked with documenting the conditions of rural life in the U.S. and developing recommendations to improve rural communities.

The Country Life Commission’s final report stated that American farmers needed better access to practical, research-based education. The Country Life Commission advocated for the creation of an Extension education system that would disseminate research-based agricultural information from land-grant universities to citizens living and working on farms.

On September 6, 1913, the Smith-Lever Act was introduced to Congress, sponsored in the house by representative Asbury F. Lever of South Carolina and in the senate by Senator Hoke Smith of Georgia. The Act sought “to provide for cooperative agricultural Extension work between the agricultural colleges in the several States… and the United States Department of Agriculture.” It was signed into law by President Woodrow Wilson on May 8, 1914, establishing the Cooperative Extension System. Wilson referred to the Smith-Lever Act as “one of the most significant and far-reaching measures for the education of adults ever adopted by the government.”

=== Impacts of World War I, the Great Depression, and the New Deal ===
In 1914, the same year that the Smith-Lever Act was signed into law, World War I began in Europe. When the United States entered the war, many farmers had to leave their farming operations behind in order to serve in the military. In order to counteract this loss of labor, CES redirected many of its efforts towards boosting food production. By 1917, over 1,600 emergency Extension agents had been hired in order to facilitate Extension programs. During this time, federal influence in Extension programming increased significantly in order to ensure programming was meeting national priorities and responding to the shifting agricultural conditions of the U.S. during WWI.

During the Great Depression, tax revenues decreased significantly, placing strain on publicly funded Extension programs. Following the passage of the New Deal, the federal government expanded support for farmers by strengthening Extension programs and expanding the local Extension workforce. Emergency funds were allocated to Extension programs, and many New Deal programs were administered by county Extension agents.

At the start of World War II, Extension resumed its efforts to encourage American farmers to meet wartime production goals. Extension programs disseminated new innovations in agriculture in order to facilitate increased food production. CES received large amounts of community support in these efforts, recruiting over 600,000 volunteers during WWII. Many CES programs during WWII focused on food preservation, subsistence gardening, and technology training. At the conclusion of WWII, Extension began to shift its efforts away from wartime priorities and back toward general educational programming.

=== Postwar expansion and modernization ===
Between 1950 and 1986, improved farming practices allowed agricultural production to increase significantly in scale across the United States. During this time, Extension agents supported farmers in adapting to new, rapidly changing technologies. When the economic prosperity of the agricultural industry declined in the 1980s, Extension agents continued to support farmers by providing education in financial literacy.

During the 1980s, Extension expanded its program offerings beyond agriculture to also include family and consumer sciences. Extension began conducting educational outreach in nutritional sciences through the Expanded Food and Nutrition Education Program (EFNEP). Programs in civic engagement and home economics were also developed at this time. The expansion of Extension’s educational scope allowed for programs to be adopted in urban and non-agricultural communities.

In 1994, certain Tribal Colleges and Universities received land-grant status after the Equity in Educational Land-Grant Status Act was passed. Congress authorized a $23 million endowment to support these colleges. Like 1862 and 1890 land-grant universities, 1994 institutions receive federal support for education, research, and community outreach in agriculture, science, and mechanical fields.

The Department of Agriculture Reorganization Act of 1994 reorganized the existing structure of the USDA in order to make it more efficient. The Act established the Cooperative State Research, Education, and Extension Service (CSREES) to oversee land-grant university research, Extension, and education programs. CSREES operated from 1994 to 2008. It was replaced by the National Institute of Food and Agriculture (NIFA) under the 2008 Farm Bill. Today, NIFA continues to oversee CES activities at the federal level.

== Land-grant universities ==
Land-grant universities support and facilitate CES programming nationwide. Land-grant universities in the United States include 1862 institutions (public universities established under the First Morrill Act), 1890 institutions (historically Black colleges and universities established under the Second Morrill Act), and 1994 institutions (tribal colleges and universities recognized as land-grant institutions in 1994).

=== Land-grant universities in the United States ===
State/territory	1862 institution	1890 institution	1994 institution
Alabama	Auburn University	Alabama A&M University; Tuskegee University	—
Alaska	University of Alaska Fairbanks	—	Ilisagvik College
Arizona	University of Arizona	—	Diné College; Tohono O'odham Community College
Arkansas	University of Arkansas (Fayetteville)	University of Arkansas at Pine Bluff	—
California	University of California System	—	D-Q University
Colorado	Colorado State University	—	—
Connecticut	University of Connecticut	—	—
Delaware	University of Delaware	Delaware State University	—
District of Columbia	University of the District of Columbia	—	—
Florida	University of Florida	Florida A&M University	—
Georgia	University of Georgia	Fort Valley State University	—
Guam	University of Guam	—	—
Hawaii	University of Hawaii	—	—
Idaho	University of Idaho	—	—
Illinois	University of Illinois Urbana-Champaign	—	—
Indiana	Purdue University	—	—
Iowa	Iowa State University	—	—
Kansas	Kansas State University	—	Haskell Indian Nations University
Kentucky	University of Kentucky	Kentucky State University	—
Louisiana	Louisiana State University	Southern University and A&M College	—
Maine	University of Maine	—	—
Maryland	University of Maryland, College Park	University of Maryland Eastern Shore	—
Massachusetts	University of Massachusetts Amherst	—	—
Michigan	Michigan State University	—	Bay Mills Community College; Keweenaw Bay Ojibwa Community College; Saginaw Chippewa Tribal College
Minnesota	University of Minnesota	—	Fond du Lac Tribal and Community College; Leech Lake Tribal College; Red Lake Nation College; White Earth Tribal and Community College
Mississippi	Mississippi State University	Alcorn State University	—
Missouri	University of Missouri (Columbia)	Lincoln University	—
Montana	Montana State University (Bozeman)	—	Blackfeet Community College; Chief Dull Knife College; Aaniiih Nakoda College; Fort Peck Community College; Little Big Horn College; Salish Kootenai College; Stone Child College
Nebraska	University of Nebraska–Lincoln	—	Little Priest Tribal College; Nebraska Indian Community College
Nevada	University of Nevada, Reno	—	—
New Hampshire	University of New Hampshire	—	—
New Jersey	Rutgers University	—	—
New Mexico	New Mexico State University	—	Navajo Technical University; Institute of American Indian Arts; Southwestern Indian Polytechnic Institute
New York	Cornell University	—	—
North Carolina	North Carolina State University	North Carolina A&T State University	—
North Dakota	North Dakota State University	—	Fort Berthold Community College; Cankdeska Cikana Community College; Sitting Bull College; Turtle Mountain College; United Tribes Technical College
Northern Mariana Islands	Northern Marianas College	—	—
Ohio	Ohio State University	Central State University	—
Oklahoma	Oklahoma State University	Langston University	College of the Muscogee Nation
Oregon	Oregon State University	—	—
Pennsylvania	Pennsylvania State University	—	—
Puerto Rico	University of Puerto Rico at Mayagüez	—	—
Rhode Island	University of Rhode Island	—	—
South Carolina	Clemson University	South Carolina State University	—
South Dakota	South Dakota State University	—	Oglala Lakota College; Sinte Gleska University; Sisseton Wahpeton College
Tennessee	University of Tennessee	Tennessee State University	—
Texas	Texas A&M University	Prairie View A&M University	—
Utah	Utah State University	—	—
Vermont	University of Vermont	—	—
Virgin Islands	University of the Virgin Islands	—	—
Virginia	Virginia Tech	Virginia State University	—
Washington	Washington State University	—	Northwest Indian College
West Virginia	West Virginia University	West Virginia State University	—
Wisconsin	University of Wisconsin–Madison	—	College of Menominee Nation; Lac Courte Oreilles Ojibwa Community College
Wyoming	University of Wyoming	—	—
American Samoa	—	—	American Samoa Community College
Federated States of Micronesia	—	—	College of Micronesia

== Notable figures ==
- Seaman Asahel Knapp (1833-1911): Seaman Asahel Knapp was an American educator and agricultural reformer. He is often referred to as the "father of the Cooperative Extension System." Knapp served as a professor of agriculture at Iowa Agricultural College (now Iowa State University), where he emphasized hands-on agricultural education. Knapp developed demonstration farms for Extension programs, and founded the county agent system. He also encouraged the formation of youth agricultural clubs which would later develop into 4-H programs.
- Albert Belmont Graham (1868-1960): A.B. Graham is regarded as the founder of the first 4-H club. On January 15, 1902, Graham hosted the first meeting of the Boys and Girls Agriculture Club in Springfield (Clark County), Ohio. Graham’s club focused on teaching young people new methods of growing corn and tomatoes. He was a lifelong educator, having graduated from the National Normal University in Lebanon, Ohio, also receiving a teaching certificate from Miami County. Graham began his career as a teacher in Champaign County, Ohio. He later served as the first superintendent of Agricultural Extension at the Ohio State University.
- Thomas Monroe Campbell (1883-1956): Following the passage of the Smith-Lever Act in 1914, Thomas Monroe Campbell was hired as the first official Cooperative Extension Agent in the United States. Campbell spent over 50 years working to improve the lives of African American farmers in the South, and trained hundreds of fellow Extension agents. By the time he retired in 1953, he had helped increase the number of Black Extension professionals to over 850 nationwide. Campbell was posthumously inducted into the National 4-H Hall of Fame in 2002.
- Liberty Hyde Bailey (1858-1954): Liberty Hyde Bailey was an American horticulturist who played a significant role in shaping agricultural education and rural life reform in the United States. Bailey joined the faculty at Cornell University in 1888, where he then founded the New York State College of Agriculture. Bailey promoted the idea that land-grant colleges should extend knowledge beyond the campus to rural citizens through demonstrations, farmer institutes, and youth programs. Bailey was the leading author of the Country Life Commission Report, which drew attention to the importance of improving rural education and contributed to the introduction of the Smith-Lever Act of 1914 which formally established CES.
- Justin S. Morrill (1810-1898): In 1854, Justin Morrill was elected to the U.S. House of Representatives, representing the state of Vermont. Morrill was responsible for introducing the Land Grant College Act of 1862 which established the land-grant university system. Morrill served in Congress for 44 years.

== See also ==
- Agricultural Extension
- Land-grant University
- National Institute of Food and Agriculture
- 4-H
