= Mulligan Stew (TV series) =

- Created by: Ira A. Klugerman and Joseph Pascal
- Starring: Steven Einbender; Larry Friedman; Mion Hahm; Barry Michlin; Benjamin Sands; Sherry Louise Wright
- Country of origin: United States
- No. of seasons: 1
- No. of episodes: 6

Production
- Production locations: Michigan State University in East Lansing, Michigan; also Washington, DC
- Running time: 30 minutes

Original release
- Release: 1972 – 1981

Mulligan Stew is an American children's educational television series, produced and sponsored by the USDA Extension Service and its youth outreach program, 4-H.

Taking its name from the dish, Mulligan Stew aired in syndication beginning in the fall of 1972 and continued in reruns on public television into the early 80s.

The six-episode series follows the adventures of a group of five school-age musicians and their mentor, all dedicated to teaching others about good nutrition and developing healthier eating habits. The series, along with various educational materials including a companion comic book with additional adventures of the characters, was developed by the Michigan State University Cooperative Extension Service.

== Overview ==
The series centers on the humorous adventures of a group of five school-aged kids who are all members of a rock band called "Mulligan Stew" (also referred to as the "Stews" or the "Mulligan Stew Force").

The band members are:

- Mulligan (Larry Friedman), the leader; occasionally plays guitar
- Maggie (Sherry Wright), identified by her long blond pigtailed hair; keyboards
- Mike (Steven Einbender), an Italian; drums
- Manny (Benjamin Sands), a Black preteen; bass
- Micki (Mi-On Hahm), a young Asian girl; guitar

(Mulligan, Maggie and Micki all sing lead vocals on most of the band's songs while Mike and Manny usually handle backing vocals.) The group's clubhouse is a basement in a brownstone apartment, fully furnished with a kitchen, shortwave radio, home gym, laboratory, and even a small stage where they rehearse their music.

Their grownup advisor and mentor is Wilbur Dooright (Barry Michlin), a bespectacled, bumbling accountant who, in some episodes, gives the kids their assignments "from upstairs", assumed to be a secret government organization (paying homage to the spy films and TV shows of the day). Wilbur provides much of the comic relief throughout the series.

== "4-4-3-2" balanced diet message ==
An integral and ubiquitous part of the program's message was the "4-4-3-2" balanced diet program, part of the standard USDA nutrition guidelines/recommendations promoted during the 1960s and 1970s. The use of dietary supplements was strongly discouraged; it was taught that all nutritional needs, including the proper intake of vitamins, minerals, fats and carbohydrates, could be adequately obtained solely by adhering to a balanced diet, with appropriate servings from the "basic four" food groups. This message was enthusiastically repeated by the children several times per episode. (The "basic four" food groups were updated by USDA in subsequent decades by the 1990s-era "Food Guide Pyramid", the later "MyPlate" and current (as of 2026) "New Pyramid" nutritional guidelines programs.)

== Production and development ==
Mulligan Stew was developed in early 1971 by the USDA Extension Service, and filmed by the USDA Motion Picture Service (which for many years prior produced educational cinematic films and TV programs for public viewing). Mulligan Stew was developed based on plan and design proposals by Developmental Committees, Iowa State University Extension Service 4-H Nutrition Television Programs. The Expanded Food and Nutrition Education Program (EFNEP) provided a grant to produce the series. (4-H is the official youth outreach and development program of the land-grant universities' Cooperative Extension Services and USDA.)

The target audience of the program was older elementary school students, fourth through sixth grade.

Eleanor Wilson, the national 4-H TV coordinator at the time, was tapped to be the series' technical advisor. Wilson subcontracted with Iowa State University to develop an outline of educational concepts for the series. USDA Extension then hired Ira Klugerman to direct the series. Klugerman, who came from a background of children's television at WQED in Pittsburgh, Pennsylvania, came up with the title and general treatment for the series. V. "Buddy" Renfro was the credited producer.

Production began on location in southeast Washington, DC in 1971 (the opening sequence was filmed at RFK Stadium). Other filming locations included major production partner Michigan State University's home base of Lansing, Michigan, and on location for one episode at Johnson Space Center in Houston. The low budget of the project proved to be a significant challenge, as well as the unique challenges of working with child actors.

The producers wanted the style of the series to reflect trends begun in other popular and innovative TV shows such as Sesame Street and Laugh-In. Puppetry and animation were frequently used. Sometimes one or two of the kids would conduct "man-on-the-street" interviews, asking ordinary citizens about nutrition-related topics. All of the music, including the theme song and the various songs sung by the kids during an episode (many times in musical "romps" reminiscent of the ones seen on The Monkees TV series), were composed and arranged by Washington, DC musician and recording engineer Paul Brier, and performed by a rock combo credited on screen as "The Eye".

Mulligan Stew premiered on October 4, 1972, during the National 4-H Week at the National 4-H Center in Washington, DC. The program was considered a success, especially by previous standards for television outreach sponsored by 4-H. The series had a moderate impact on kids making better choices in what they ate, and provided 4-H with a sizable marketing, promotional and public relations boost. Thanks in part to the popularity of Mulligan Stew, 4-H membership was boosted to an all-time high in 1974, and the series continued to air in reruns on public television until 1981.

== Episode list ==
№	Title
1	"The Great Nutrition Turn On"
Wilbur and the Stews are given a secret assignment to travel to the town of Lazy Susan and rescue the lethargic locals, whose energy is being sapped from poor eating habits. On the way, the gang stops by a 4-H Fair and samples the exhibits.
2	"Look Inside Yourself"
The Stews explain the basics of nutrition and digestion, as well as the importance of eating breakfast; they explain this to two lethargic and grouchy teenagers (played by two uncredited young actors) they have been assigned to help. Then-Washington Senators manager and baseball legend Ted Williams makes a cameo appearance in the pre-opening teaser; Senators star player Frank Howard makes a cameo later in the episode.
3	"The Flim Flam Man"
The Stews shun Mulligan when he refuses to follow the direction of a macrobiotics-like fad diet promoter, who tricks the rest of the kids into trying his fad diets. A concerned Mulligan frantically seeks assistance from Wilbur, who engages the con man in a nutritional duel. Mulligan is ultimately proven correct, but not without some anguish on everyone's part.
4	"Getting It All Together"
The Stews enlist suggestions from friends and family as they help prepare a buffet for an international 4-H conference, to spotlight the nutritional value of international foods.
5	"Countdown 4-4-3-2"
With a rescue bag of food in tow, the Stews come to Wilbur's aid when he chooses a dark and stormy night for a camp-out. In some segments, the kids visit Johnson Space Center in Houston, Texas, and interview Dr. Malcom Smith (chief nutritionist for NASA) and astronauts Jack Swigert and Joseph Kerwin. The overall theme is how innovations in food science, such as freeze-drying and aquaculture, have the possibility to meet the nutritional needs of a growing population.
6	"The Racer That Lost His Edge"
With the help of a balanced diet, a sidelined race car driver regains his proper racing weight and returns to action — and his gout is alleviated as well.

== Guest appearances ==
Several celebrities or future celebrities made uncredited appearances, either as part of the main storyline or in brief segments; among these were Richard Sanders who later gained fame playing Les Nessman on WKRP in Cincinnati. Ordinary citizens were interviewed by the kids in selected segments of some episodes in a "man on the street" format.

- Larry Friedman (Mulligan) performed in the musical Rasputin with Ted Neeley and John Hurt.
- Mion Hahm (Micki) is a realtor in Florida.
- Steve Einbender (Mike) is Senior Manager of Customer Analytics for The Home Depot, in Atlanta, Georgia. He still plays drums.
- Benjamin Sands (Manny) is a music teacher in the Washington, D.C. area.
- Sherry Wright (Maggie) pursued an acting and singing career while living in Alexandria, Virginia; she died in July 2009.
- Barry Michlin (Wilbur) had a number of minor roles throughout the 1970s and 1980s, and also made recurring appearances in several TV commercials including for Arm & Hammer Baking Soda with actress Beverly Sanders. He is a photographer based in Los Angeles.
