= A.B. Graham House =

Historic house in Ohio, United States

- U.S. National Register of Historic Places
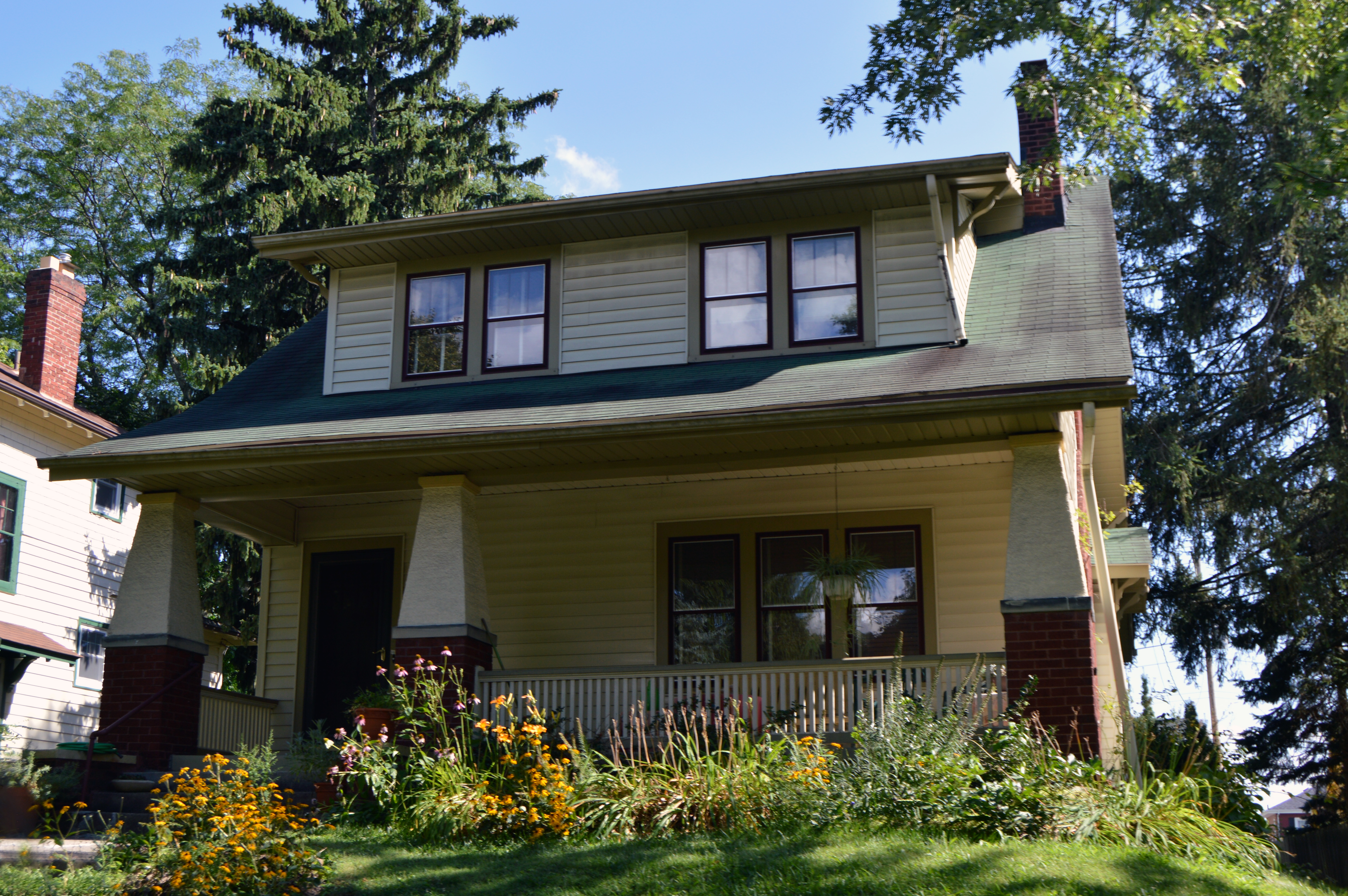
- Interactive map highlighting the building's location
- Location: 159 Clinton Heights Ave., Columbus, Ohio
- Coordinates: 40.030040°N 83.010841°W
- Built: 1918
- Architectural style: Craftsman
- NRHP reference No.: 15000323
- Added to NRHP: June 5, 2015

The A.B. Graham House is a historic building in Clintonville, Columbus, Ohio. The 1.5-story Craftsman house was built in 1918 for Albert Belmont Graham. It was listed on the National Register of Historic Places in 2015.

== See also ==
- National Register of Historic Places listings in Columbus, Ohio
