= Truman and Sylvia Bull Coe House =

Historic house in Ohio, United States

- U.S. National Register of Historic Places
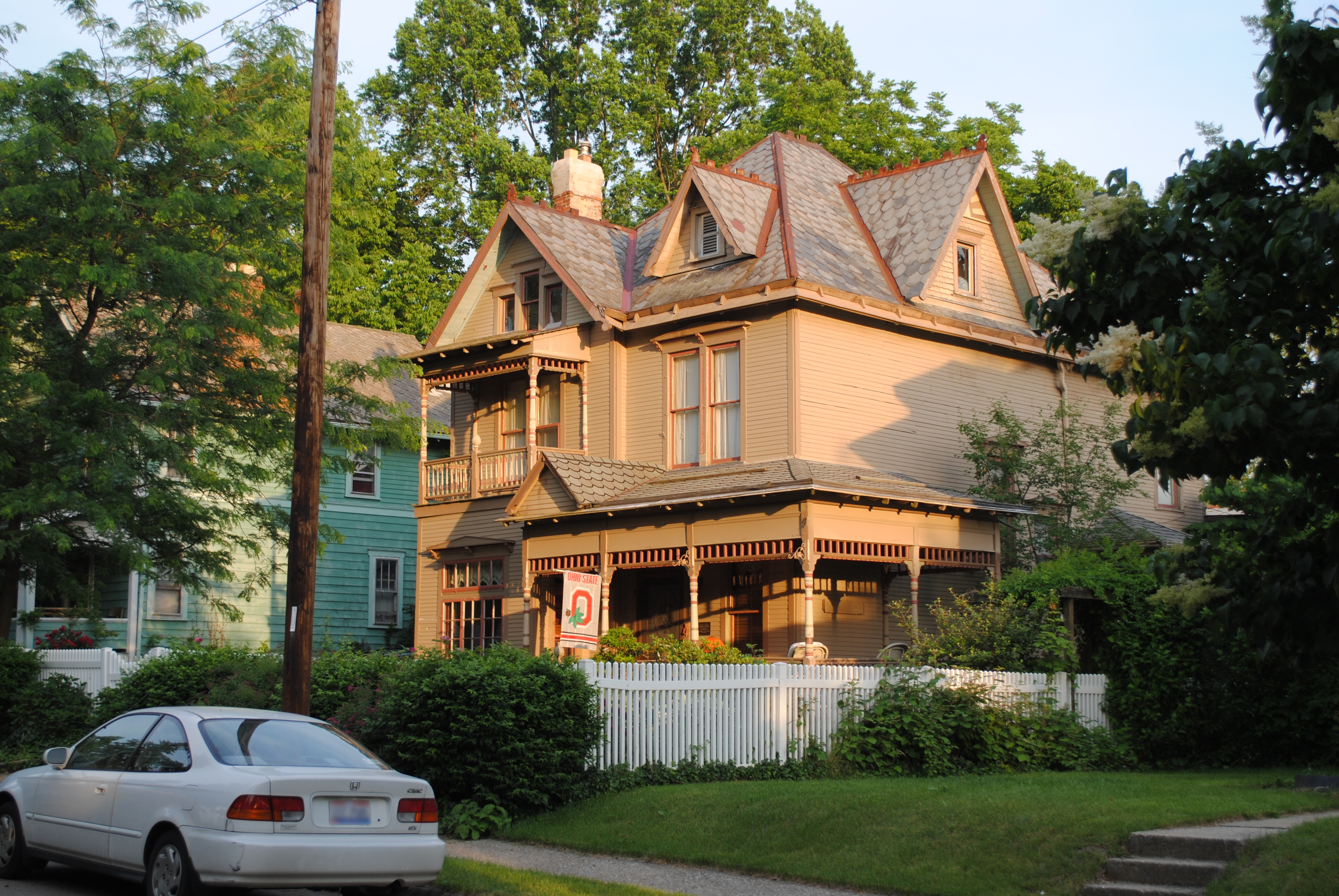
- Exterior in 2010
- Interactive map highlighting the building's location
- Location: 75 E. Lakeview Ave., Columbus, Ohio
- Coordinates: 40.027150°N 83.012337°W
- Built: c. 1880-85
- Architectural style: Queen Anne-Eastlake
- NRHP reference No.: 06000361
- Added to NRHP: May 10, 2006

The Truman and Sylvia Bull Coe House is a historic building in the Clintonville neighborhood of Columbus, Ohio. It was listed on the National Register of Historic Places in 2006. The house is significant for its Queen Anne-Eastlake style architecture. It is one of few remaining houses of the style or from the 19th century in the neighborhood.

== See also ==
- National Register of Historic Places listings in Columbus, Ohio
