= Northmoor Engine House =

Fire station in Columbus, Ohio

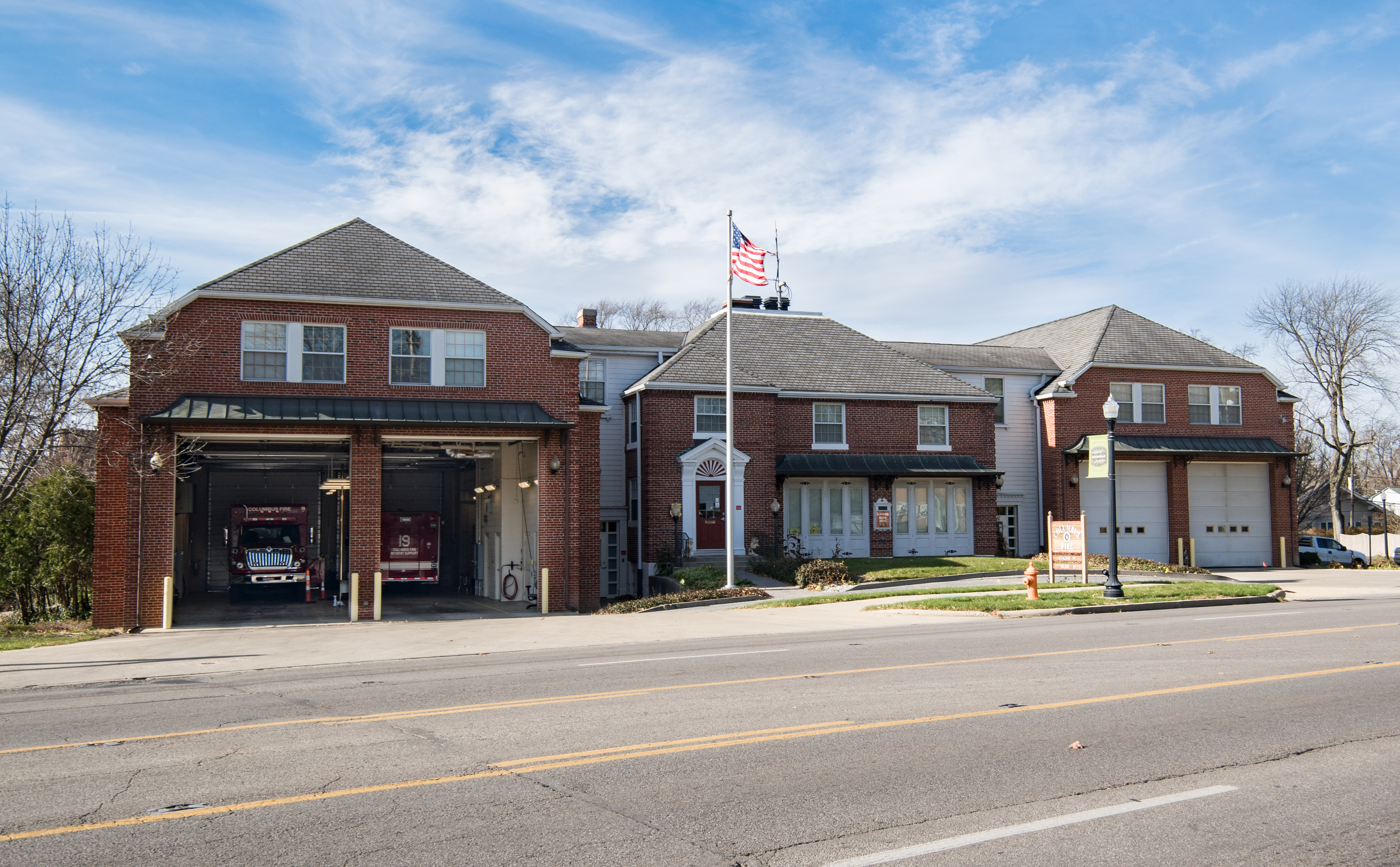
- Location: 3601 N. High Street, Columbus, Ohio
- Coordinates: 40.035561°N 83.017317°W
- Built: 1931
- Architectural style: Colonial Revival
- Website: Official website

Columbus Register of Historic Properties
- Designated: September 24, 2003
- Reference no.: CR-55

The Northmoor Engine House, or Station 19, is a Columbus Division of Fire station in the Clintonville neighborhood of Columbus, Ohio. It was listed on the Columbus Register of Historic Properties in 2003. It was named for Jerry Kuhn in 2002; Kuhn was a lieutenant for Station 19 and died in the line of duty in 1972.

The Northmoor Engine House was built in the Colonial Revival style, and was designed to blend into the surrounding neighborhood. It was completed in 1931, though the Great Depression made it the only station built in the city in that period. The city's lack of funds for new equipment and staff only prompted the station's use over a year after completion, and only through an equipment and personnel transfer. The station operated through into the 2000s, when it became too antiquated for modern firefighting equipment. Community support for the building prompted its preservation, and additions to the structure were completed in 2003.

== History ==
The initial fire station was built from March to May 1931; the cornerstone was laid on March 10. The station was the only one built in the city during the Great Depression. The building cost "several thousands of dollars", though it was unoccupied for over a year past its opening. The city had weakened finances, and thus postponed purchasing fire equipment and hiring firefighters to operate the station. Around May 1932, the city began the bidding process to purchase a fire engine for the station, relieving the then-new portion of the city from having to utilize a station over three miles away, which only had a single fire truck. By late May, the city found it lacked the $18,000 necessary for new equipment, and so the city council ordered a fire engine and eight men to relocate from Engine House 16 to the new station. The station was dedicated, staffed by ten firefighters, on August 24, 1932.

By the early 2000s, the building was too small and antiquated, lacking support for modern firefighting equipment. A group, the committee to Save the Northmoor Engine House, formed to advocate for the building's preservation. Local residents demonstrated the possibility of adaptive reuse. Local resident architects created a feasibility study, placed the structure on the Columbus Register, and collected resident endorsements. In 2002, the city began construction of new wings to the original structure, a $3 million project designed by Schorr and Associates.

== Design ==
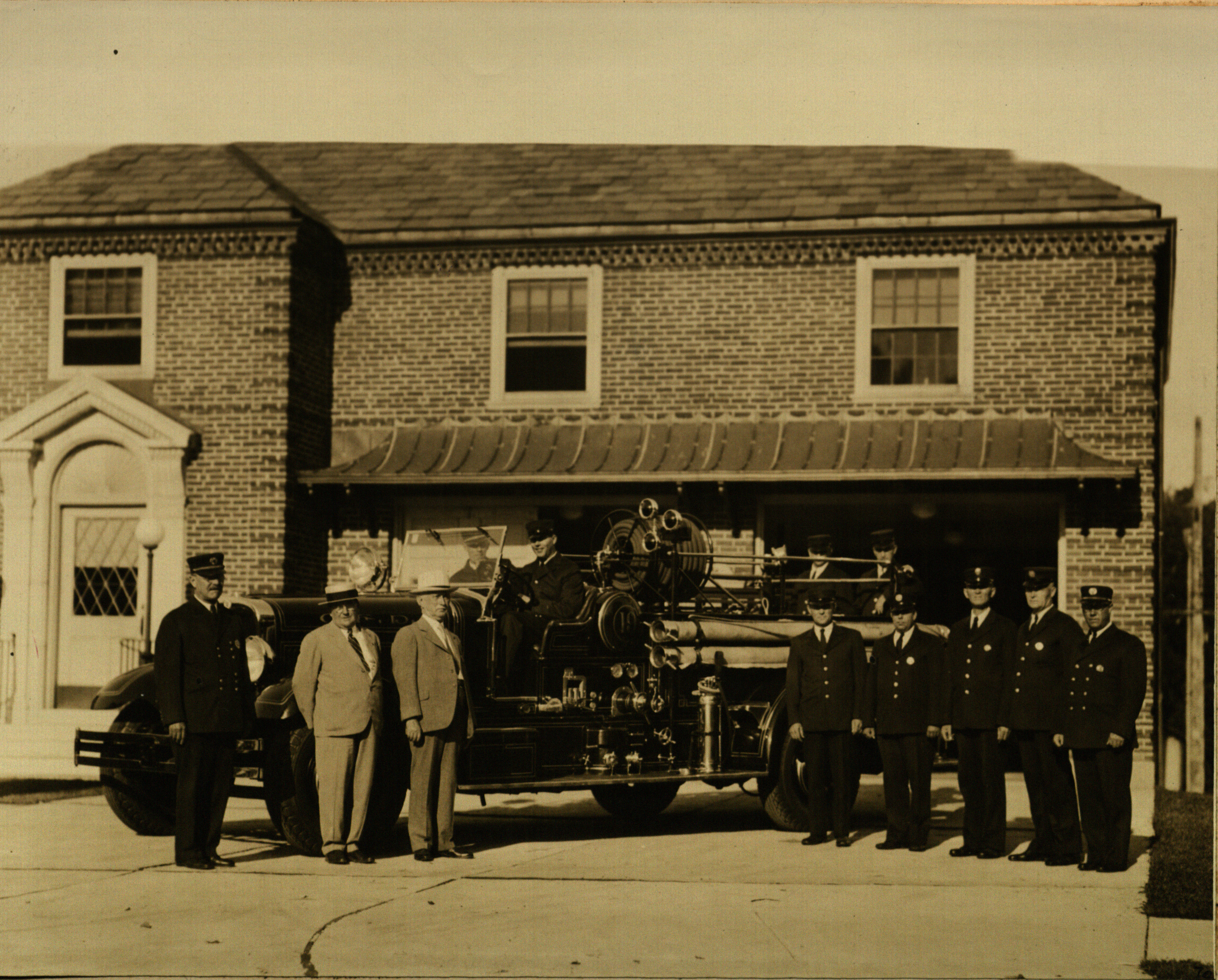
The fire station as originally built

The Northmoor Engine House, as originally built, was a two-story red brick building with white trim. It measured 41 by 43 feet. The structure was built in the Colonial Revival style, and was designed in a residential style, to blend into the surrounding neighborhood. It was considered "one of the most modern engine houses in the country".

The station was one of the newest Columbus fire stations built with a fireman's pole; before 1982 only the older stations 10, 14, 17, and 18 had them. Replacement Stations 1, 14, and 18 are the only newer stations featuring fire poles, which are often seen as unsafe.

== See also ==
- Fire stations in Columbus, Ohio
