= Old Beechwold Historic District =

Historic district in Ohio, United States

- U.S. National Register of Historic Places
- U.S. Historic district
- Columbus Register of Historic Properties
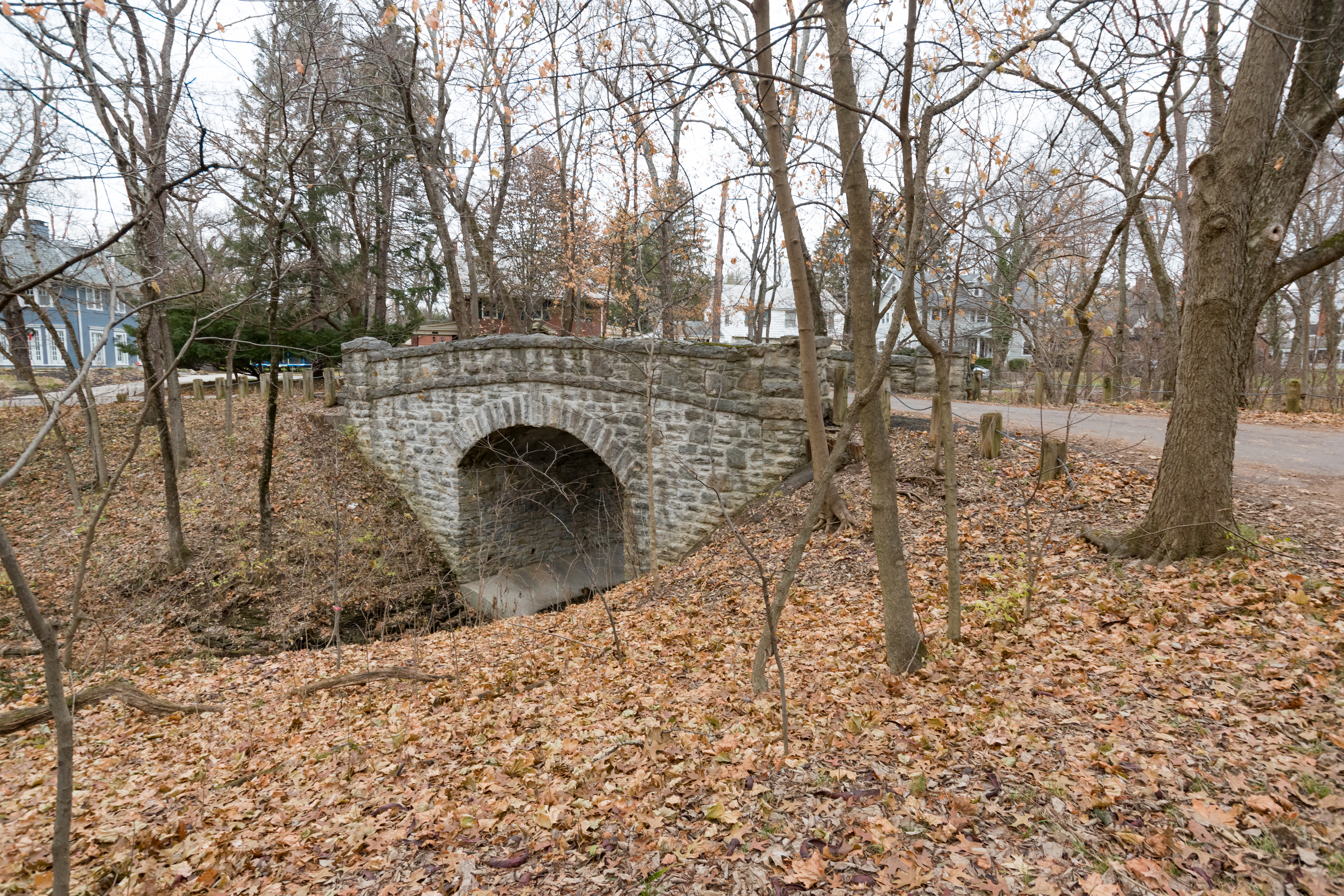
- Contributing bridge
- Interactive map highlighting the district among other historic sites
- Location: Bounded by Rathbone Ave, N. High St, Beaumont Rd, and the Olentangy River, Columbus, Ohio
- Coordinates: 40.060278°N 83.023333°W
- NRHP reference No.: 87001146
- CRHP No.: CR-38

Significant dates
- Added to NRHP: September 22, 1987
- Designated CRHP: August 1, 1985

The Old Beechwold Historic District is a neighborhood and historic district in Clintonville, Columbus, Ohio. The site was listed on the Columbus Register of Historic Properties in 1985 and the National Register of Historic Places in 1987. The district is significant for its architecture, landscape architecture, and community planning. The houses are of the early 20th century, using stone, brick, and stucco.

The land was originally part of a large tract owned by a single family, but in 1902, 75 of those acres were sold to the Columbus Zoological Company. The company established one of the first zoos in Columbus, known as "The Zoo", that failed after only five months, opening in May and closing in November of 1905. In 1906, Joseph A. Jeffrey acquired the land, and created a suburban estate named "Beechwalde". He built the two oldest houses in the district. The former monkey house can still be seen on the property of 150 West Beechwold Boulevard where it is used as a barn. The zoo's original brick entrance can also be seen on North High Street at Beechwold Road.

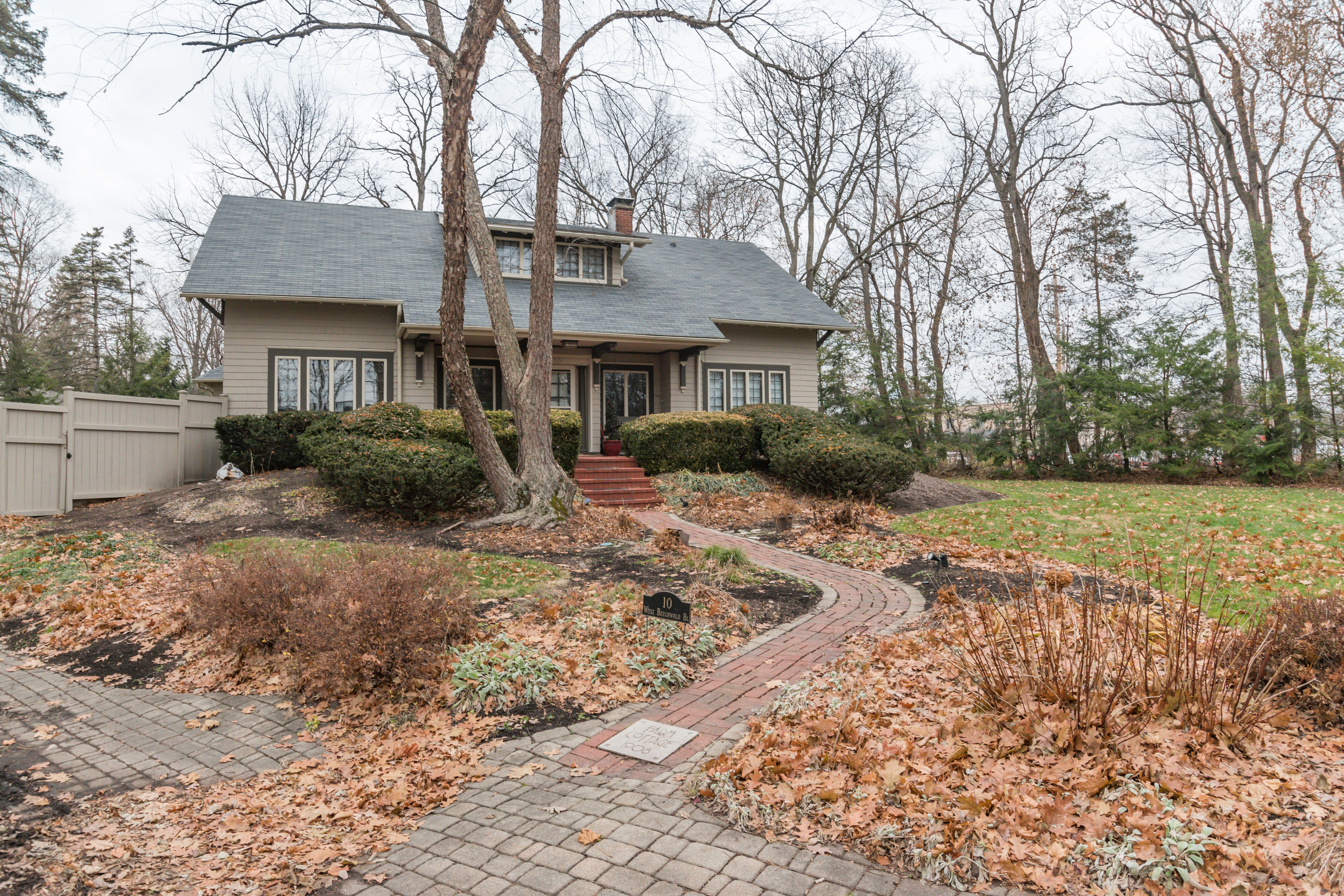
Contributing house in the district

== See also ==
- National Register of Historic Places listings in Columbus, Ohio
