= Expanded Food and Nutrition Education Program =

Educational program in the United States

The Expanded Food and Nutrition Education Program (EFNEP) is a program of the Cooperative Extension System that operates in all 50 states and U.S. territories. Started in 1969, its purpose is to provide low-income individuals, particularly youth and families with young children, with the knowledge, skills, and desire to adopt and maintain a nutritious diet.

== Adult EFNEP ==
The adult program consists of a series of 10-12 lessons, taught over a course of several months by paraprofessionals (peer educators) and volunteers. The lessons utilize an experimental learning approach that helps participants learn how to make more nutritious food choices. As a result, participants are able to improve the nutritional quality of meals they serve to their families as well as to meet their nutritional needs. In addition, they are taught new skills in food production, preparation, storage, and sanitation, as well as strategies to manage their food budget and resources from federal, state, and local food assistance agencies and organizations. Related topics of physical activity and overall health are also addressed. The learn-by-doing approach used in the program allows for participants to acquire the practical skills required to make positive behavior changes.

== Youth EFNEP ==
Nutrition education is provided at schools as an enrichment of the curriculum, in after-school care programs and through 4-H EFNEP clubs, day camps, residential camps, community centers, neighborhood groups, and home gardening workshops. Lessons in food preparation, food safety, health and physical activity are also addressed in the youth program. The 1970s TV series Mulligan Stew was produced by the USDA as a component of 4-H EFNEP.
