= Clintonville (Columbus, Ohio) =

Neighborhood of Columbus, Ohio, United States

- Neighborhood of Columbus
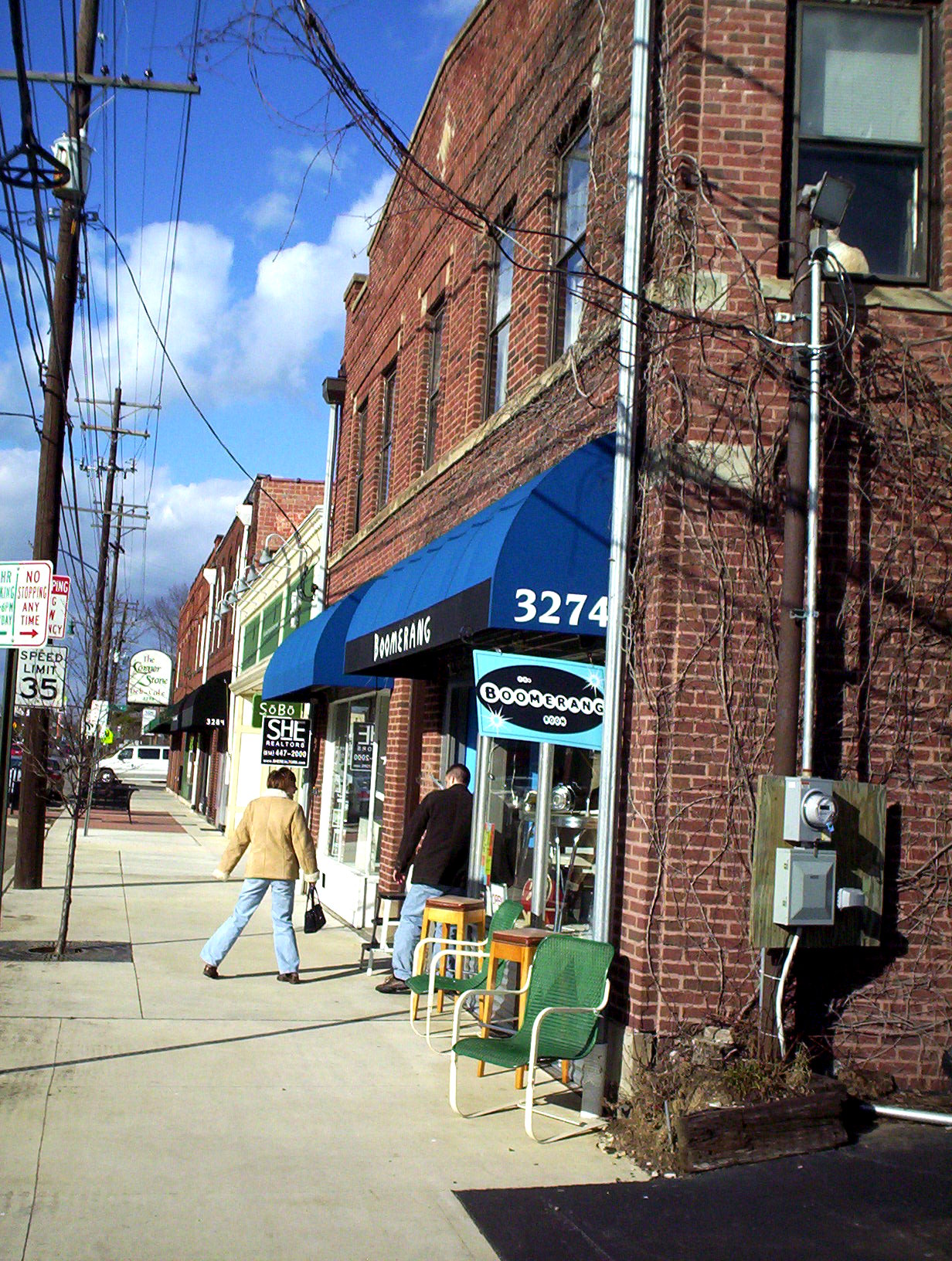
- North High Street in Clintonville
- Interactive map of Clintonville
- Coordinates: 40.041596°N 83.018575°W
- Country: United States
- State: Ohio
- County: Franklin
- City: Columbus
- ZIP Code: 43202, 43214

Clintonville is a neighborhood in north-central Columbus, Ohio, United States with around 30,000 residents. Its borders, associated with the Clintonville Area Commission, are the Olentangy River on the west, Glen Echo Creek to the south, a set of railroad tracks to the east, and on the north by Henderson Rd. (North of Henderson Rd. is known as Beechwold, which goes to Morse Rd. on the north. Beyond that and up to the Worthington city line is simply the City of Columbus, and is not part of Beechwold.)

As the cachet of the Clintonville neighborhood grew towards the turn of the 21st century, real estate agents began to label homes north of Cooke Road as Clintonville or Clintonville or Beechwold thus leading to the apparent absorption of Beechwold and nearby Columbus subdivisions south of Worthington. The area also contains the former unincorporated community of Evanston, a name that was used by the Big Four Railroad as a station along its line and U.S. Postal service until the 1920s. Clintonville includes parts of ZIP codes 43202 and 43214. The United States Post Offices at the center of each ZIP code are known as Clintonville Station and Beechwold Station, respectively.

== History ==
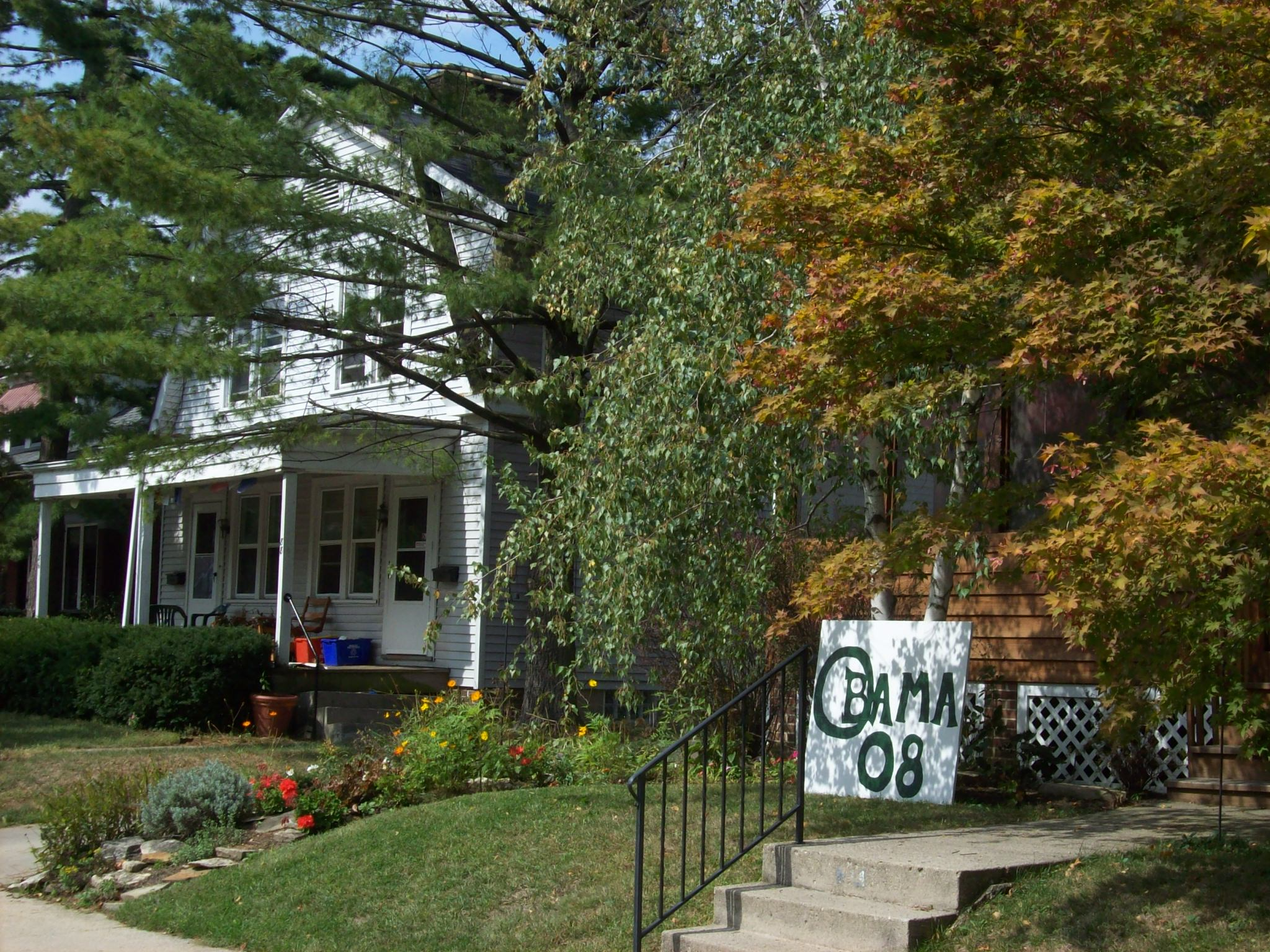
Typical homes on Tulane Road in one of the large residential sections

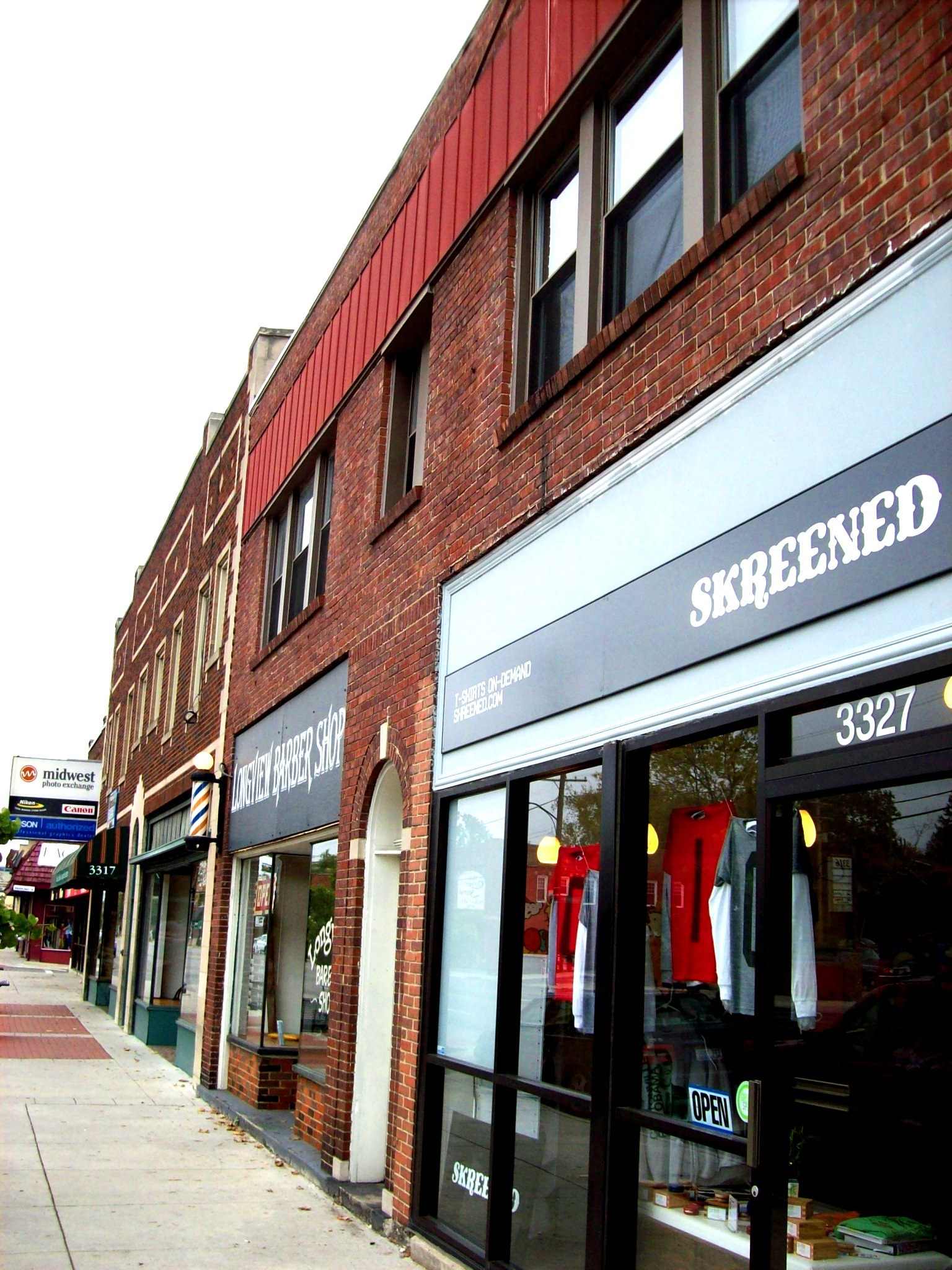
Commercial strip

The community of Clintonville developed as the center of Clinton Township (named for the U.S. Vice President George Clinton), part of the land grants given to Continental Army soldiers in lieu of pensions in what used to be Wyandot Indian territory. For years, the steep hillsides discouraged development, until farmland was purchased by the Bull family and then used for religious services. Clinton Chapel (now a funeral home) was constructed in 1838 and served as a stop on the Underground Railroad over the next two decades. Thomas Bull, a Methodist minister, along with his wife, four sons and one of his two daughters moved to Central Ohio from Vermont in 1812. His second daughter, Chloe Brevoort and her family, joined the rest of the Bull family about a year later. The family first settled in the Worthington area while they searched for land to purchase at a suitable price.

In 1813, Bull purchased 600 acres along the Columbus-Worthington Pike from John Rathbone. Before the Adams administration patented the land to Rathbone, it had been part of the United States Military Lands—land which was set aside to be given to Revolutionary War soldiers as both a pension and as a payment for their service in the War of Independence. Rathbone was a New Yorker who had never set foot in Ohio. Nonetheless, he owned a quarter section of Clinton Township which was named for George Clinton, the vice president in the Jefferson administration.

Once Thomas Bull and his family settled the land and began to farm, they were faced with a mighty problem. Namely, there was no one else around— nowhere they could easily go to buy shoes, have blacksmith or carpentry work done—they were isolated. This isolation made the management of a 600-acre farm difficult at best.

In an attempt to draw others to the area and lessen the isolation of their farm, the Bulls built businesses in the center of Clinton Township, along the plank toll road that later became North High Street, the main north–south thoroughfare connecting Columbus to Worthington, Ohio to the north. They offered to give these buildings away to any skilled laborers who would stay. A post office designated "Clintonville" opened in the center of this district on September 13, 1847, and this date is marked by present-day Clintonville residents as the neighborhood's "birthday".

By the early 1900s, downtown Columbus residents and professors from Ohio State University had built summer homes in Clintonville and the surrounding farmland was developed into housing developments shortly after the extension of the streetcar lines northward from Columbus, which identifies the community as a streetcar suburb of Columbus. A business district developed in Beechwold, separated by nearly a mile of residences from the Clintonville district to the south. Both communities were entirely part of Columbus by the 1950s after it annexed most of Clinton Township.

== Governance ==
Clintonville is part of the City of Columbus and is therefore governed by the City of Columbus.

Because Columbus City Council does not use a ward system of representative government (all members of City Council are elected at large) the city created a series of Area Commissions to act in an advisory capacity to the city in reviewing zoning, variance, and demolition requests. The Clintonville and Beechwold neighborhoods, along with other Columbus neighborhoods are represented by the Clintonville Area Commission. The nine district-representative commissioners of the commission are nominated by neighborhood elections—with the commissioners being subsequently subject to appointment by the Columbus mayor and affirmation by the Columbus City Council. The Old Beechwold subdivision is further subject to an architectural review process.

Since 2004, residents along the southern ridge of Glen Echo Ravine have been seeking to have their neighborhood represented by the Clintonville Area Commission rather than by the University Area Commission, citing the view that their needs more closely match those of Clintonville residents than those of the University Area. While there currently is not a process for accommodating such requests, their request has caught the attention of city leaders who are examining the whole area commission program.

== Neighborhoods ==
The topography of Clintonville is divided into two distinct regions, with North High Street forming the demarcation line. Property west of North High Street to the Olentangy River is lower in elevation than property to east of North High Street. Six glacial ravines, Glen Echo, Walhalla, Overbrook, Beechwold, Delawanda and Bill Moose Run cut through the area from east to west, with stream beds feeding into the Olentangy River. Four of the ravines have been developed, either with public roadbeds and/or private residences, with Glen Echo being the first ravine preserved as a public park in 1913. A portion of Overbrook Ravine is part of Whetstone Park, adjacent to the Park of Roses.

Residential districts in Clintonville are divided into five distinct (official & unofficial) areas:

- South Clintonville – South of North Broadway, housing stock is a mix of single and multiple family homes. The majority of these houses were built prior to 1930, and represent a variety of styles from basic American foursquare to other types of revival style architecture. The area is also home to many catalog (Sears, Montgomery Ward, Radford, etc.) kit homes. These neighborhoods were also initially developed as "streetcar" developments, the intention being that most residents would rely upon the High Street streetcar lines to travel to downtown Columbus. Garages for the earliest developed streets are accessed via alleys behind the properties.
- North Clintonville – Immediately north of North Broadway and stretching to the Overbrook Ravine, this central section of Clintonville shows the progression in architectural styles and lifestyle considerations from 1910 through the late 1950s. Houses in this portion of Clintonville were built as higher end properties, lack alleyways and contain driveways as a nod to the increasing importance to the role of the automobile.

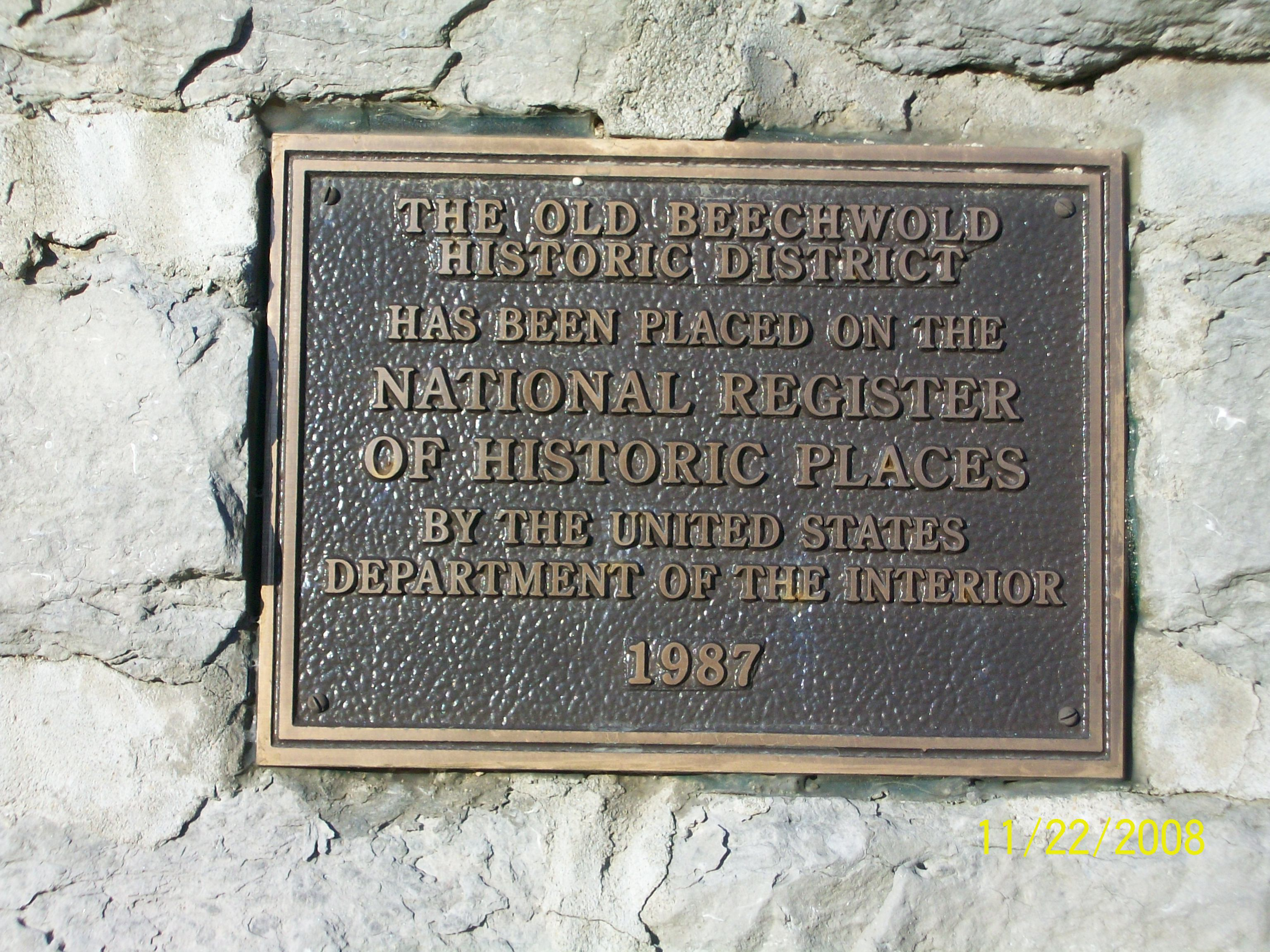
Plaque placed at the entry to Old Beechwold

- Beechwold – Named for the Jeffrey family summer estate on North High Street, Beechwold contains the widest variety of housing, from Cape Cod influenced starter homes to high style, high end housing that occupies the land comprising the former Jeffrey family estate. Loosely defined as the area North of Henderson Rd, South of Riverview Park, East to Indianola Ave. and West to the Olentangy River.
- North of Morse – North of Morse Road and extending north to the Worthington city limits. This area is home to Bill Moose Run, the recently refurbished Graceland Shopping Center, the Ohio School for the Deaf and the Ohio State School for the Blind. A new park has recently been created at the site of the former Sharon Elementary School. The unincorporated areas west of High Street and located in Sharon Township are not part of Clintonville.
- Old Beechwold – Old Beechwold is Clintonville's only neighborhood that is listed on the city, state and National Historic Registry. Old Beechwold is bounded on the East by High Street and on the West by the Olentangy River. The northernmost street is W. Jeffrey Place. The southernmost street is Riverview Park.

== Streets ==
Like many of the neighborhoods in Columbus, the streets were often named after either early settlers or areas of Great Britain. However, the streets in the Walhalla Park Place section of Clintonville bear the legacy of Mathias Armbruster, a Bavarian immigrant who was fascinated with Norse mythology and Wagnerian opera; these street names include Druid, Mimring, Midgard, Brynhild, Gudrun, and Walhalla.

List of early settlers who have streets named after them:

- Judge Orland Aldrich (1882)
- Isaac Brevoort (1814)
- Reverend Philander Chase (1817) – First Episcopal Bishop of Ohio
- John Webster (1831)
- Jacob Weisheimer (1865)
- Dr. Charles Wetmore (1830)

List of early land owners who have streets named after them:

- Henry C. Cook(e)
- A. Henderson
- Thomas A. Ingham
- Walter Guy Richards
- L. E. Schreyer

== Landmarks ==
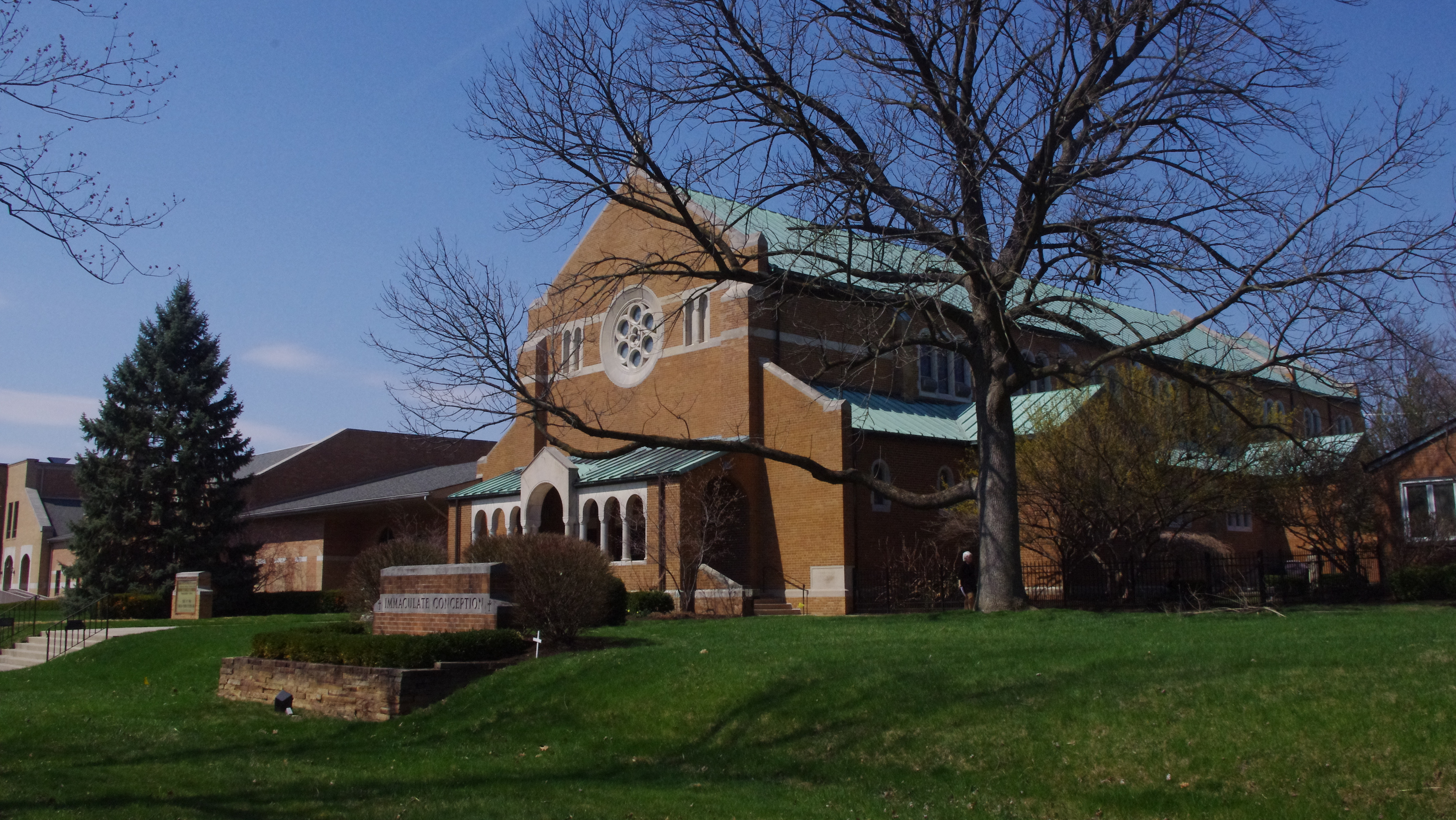
Immaculate Conception Church in Clintonville

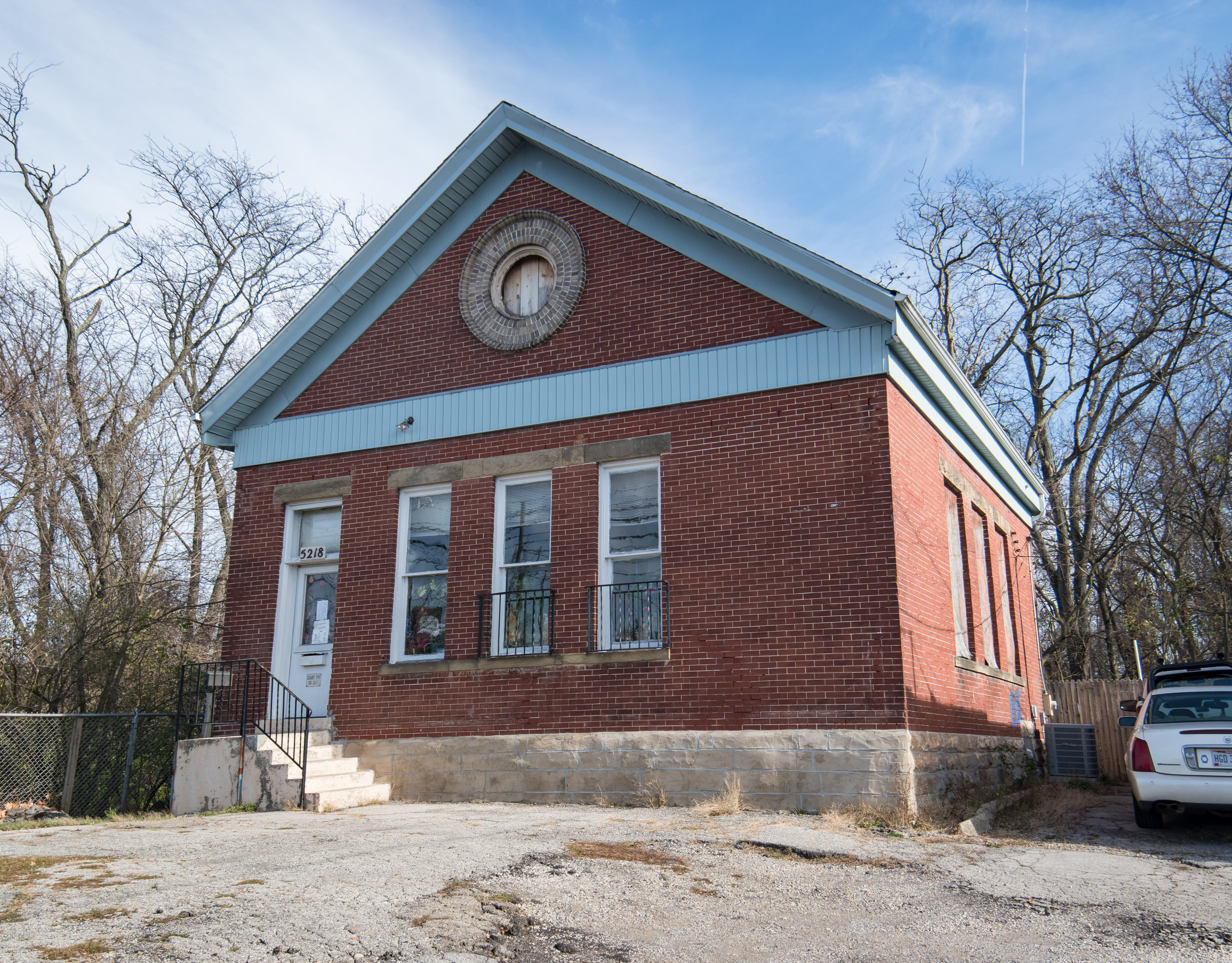
Former schoolhouse on High Street

Popular landmarks in Clintonville include its registered historic sites, the "Welcome to Clintonville" signs at the main entryways of the community, and Immaculate Conception Church.

A commemorative historical marker for Clinton Township and Clintonville is now at the North High Street entrance driveway to the Clintonville Woman's Club, the sign originally having been at the corner of East North Broadway and North High streets – a mile south of the present location.

Landmarks on the national and Columbus registers of historic places include:

- A.B. Graham House
- East North Broadway Historic District
- Northmoor Engine House
- Old Beechwold Historic District
- Richard Berry Jr. House
- Truman and Sylvia Bull Coe House
- Weisheimer House

=== Whetstone Park ===
Whetstone Park in Clintonville is a Columbus landmark. The Park includes bike trails, baseball fields and tennis courts, a pond, ravine, library and recreation facility, as well as the 13-acre (5.3 ha) Columbus Park of Roses. Opened in 1952, the Park of Roses is a frequent site for weddings and special events. In June, the Park of Roses hosts its annual "Rose Festival." During summer months concerts featuring many of Columbus' brass bands are held every Sunday evening at the Park's gazebo. Originally located at Fort Hayes, the gazebo was relocated to the park and restored in 1976. A group of volunteers hosted an annual Fourth of July fireworks display for the Clintonville community at Whetstone Park, but the group disbanded in 2019.

=== Olentangy Park ===
Clintonville was once home to the largest amusement park in the United States. First opened in 1880 as "The Villa," by 1900, the 100-acre (0.40 km^{2}) park and picnic ground had become Olentangy Park in 1896. This park, located along North High Street between North Street and Tulane Road, grew rapidly between 1900 and 1915 and at one time, featured four large roller coasters, including a rare looping coaster known as the "Loop the Loop", a zoo, a dance pavilion, a large "Shoot-the-Chutes" water slide, and a building from which visitors could rent canoes for a day on the Olentangy River. It was also home to the largest theatre in the country, as well as the largest swimming pool in the country at the time. Olentangy Park closed for its last season in 1937 and its land sold to L.L. LeVeque in 1938. The land was used to build the Olentangy Village apartment complex; scattered remains of the park could still be found in the woods by the river as recently as the late 1980s. The park's carousel was moved several times and in 1999 it was restored. This carousel can now be seen at the Columbus Zoo and Aquarium.

=== Columbus Zoo ===
Columbus's first zoo was located in Clintonville. Opening in May 1905, the "Columbus Zoological Gardens" was located in what is now Old Beechwold at Beechwold Road and North High Street. The zoo closed only five months later in October 1905. The only remaining structures are the zoo's monkey house, now used as a barn and located at 150 W. Beechwold Blvd., the zoo's stone entrance way, and the "kissing bridge," now Rustic Bridge Road.

=== Historic school buildings ===
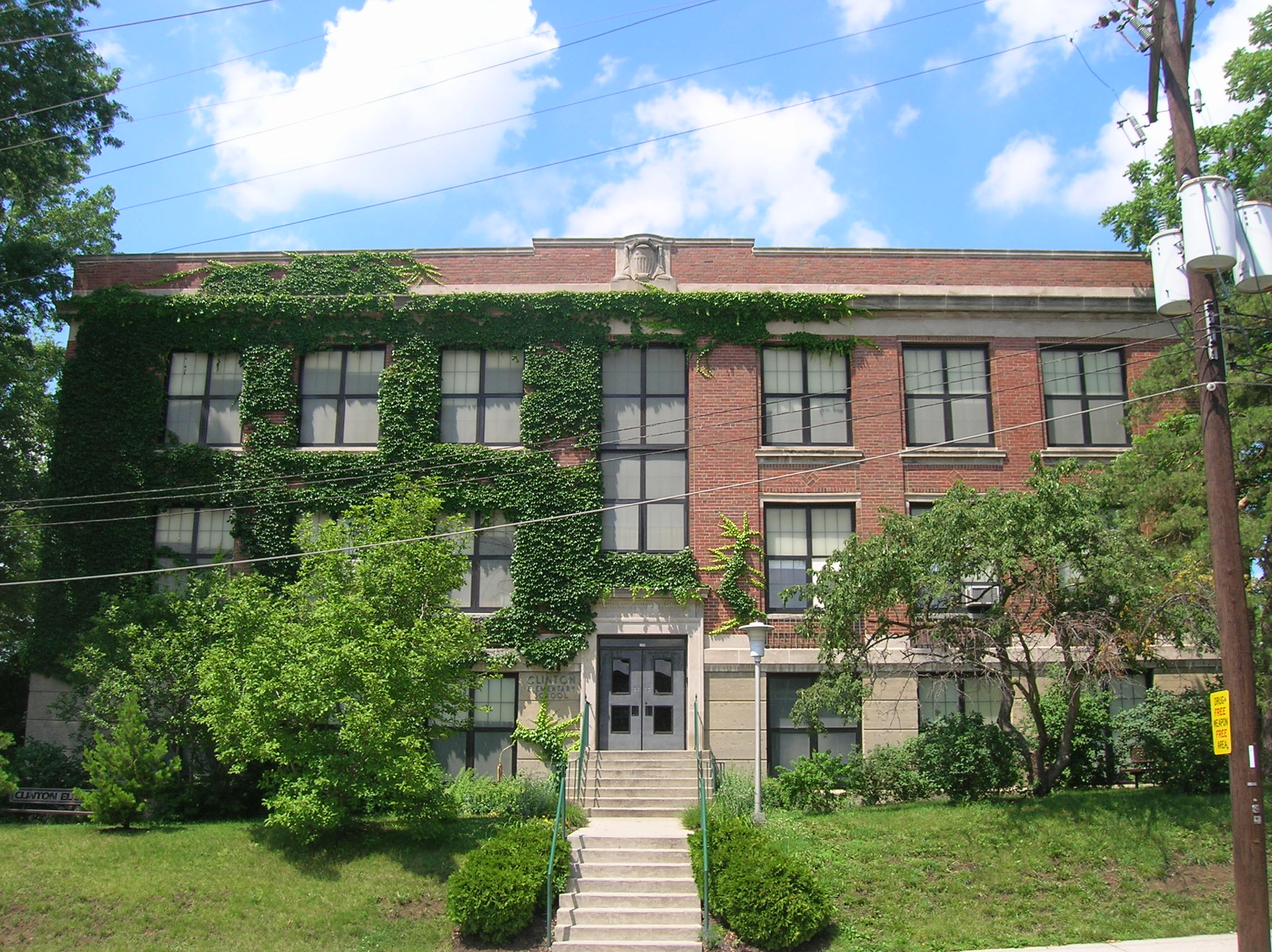
Clinton Elementary School

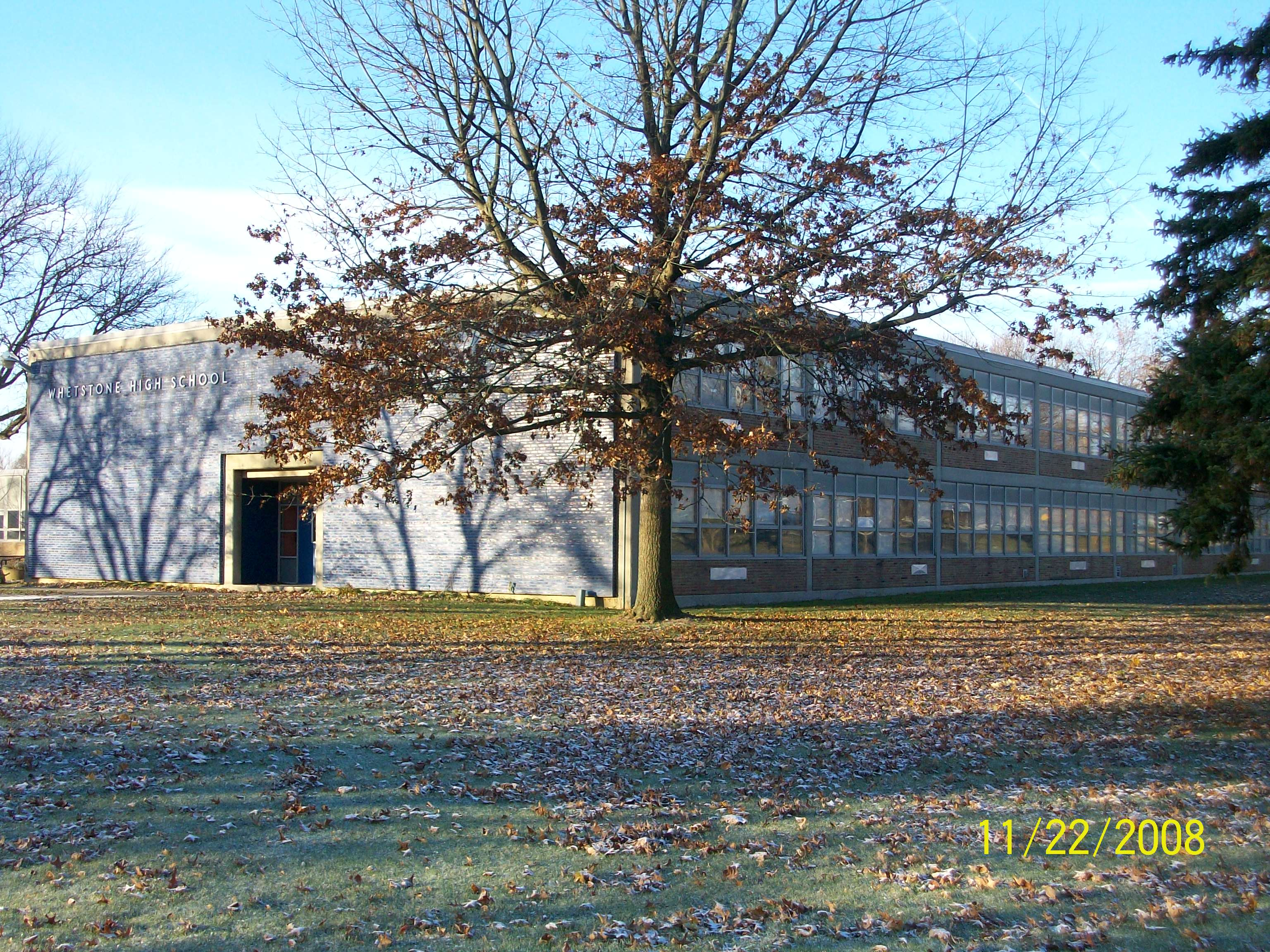
Whetstone High School

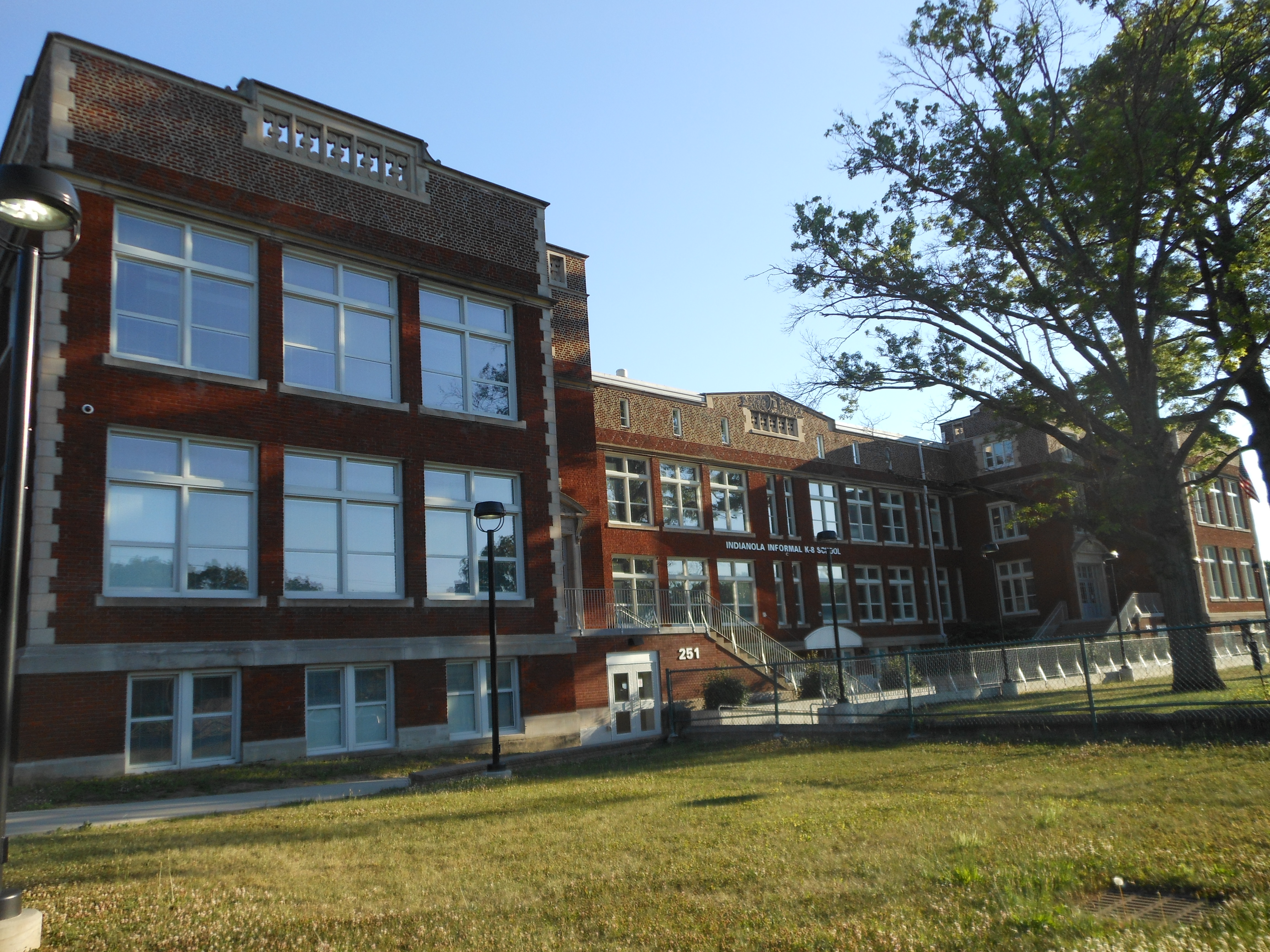
Crestview School

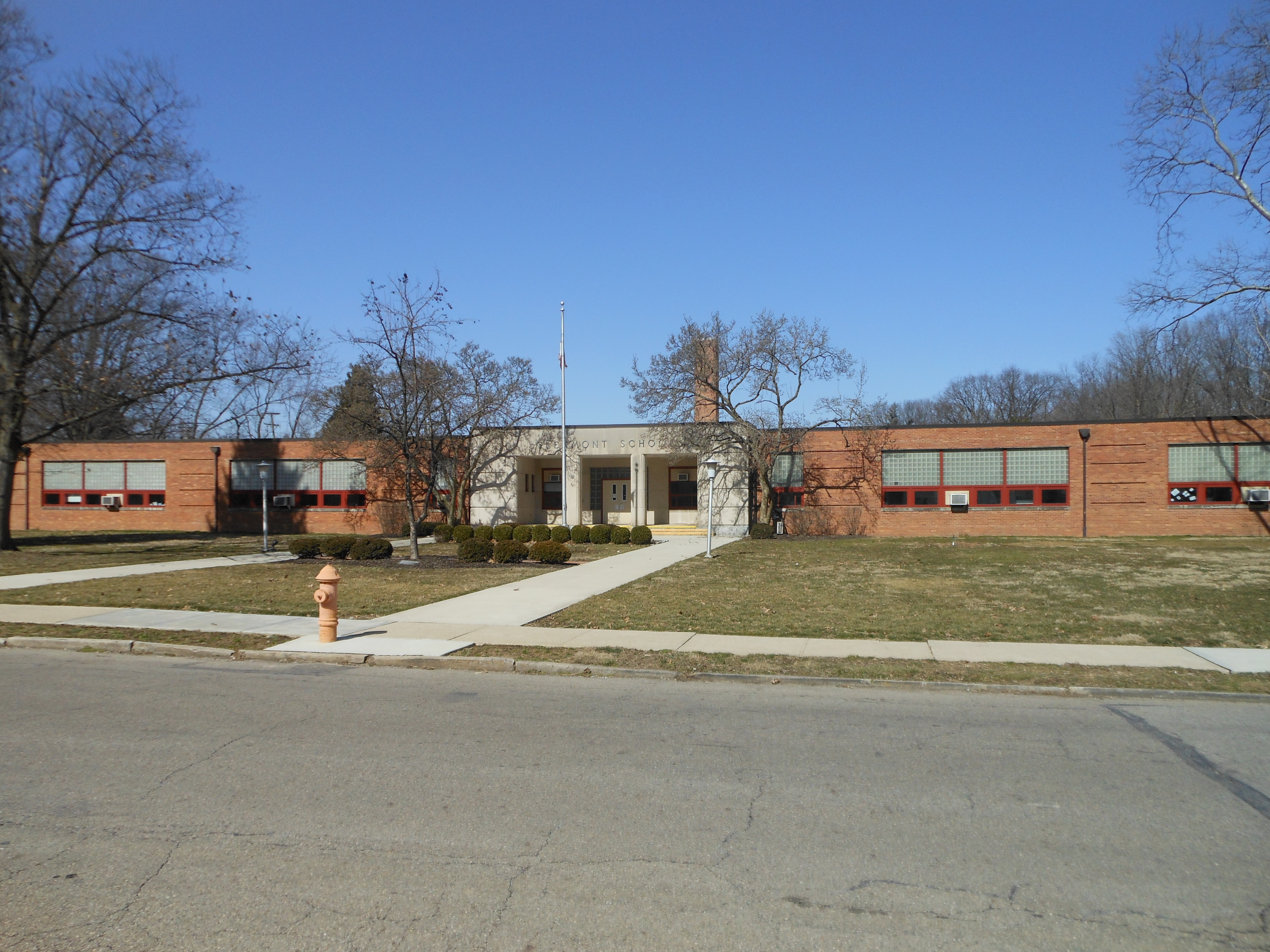
Glenmont School

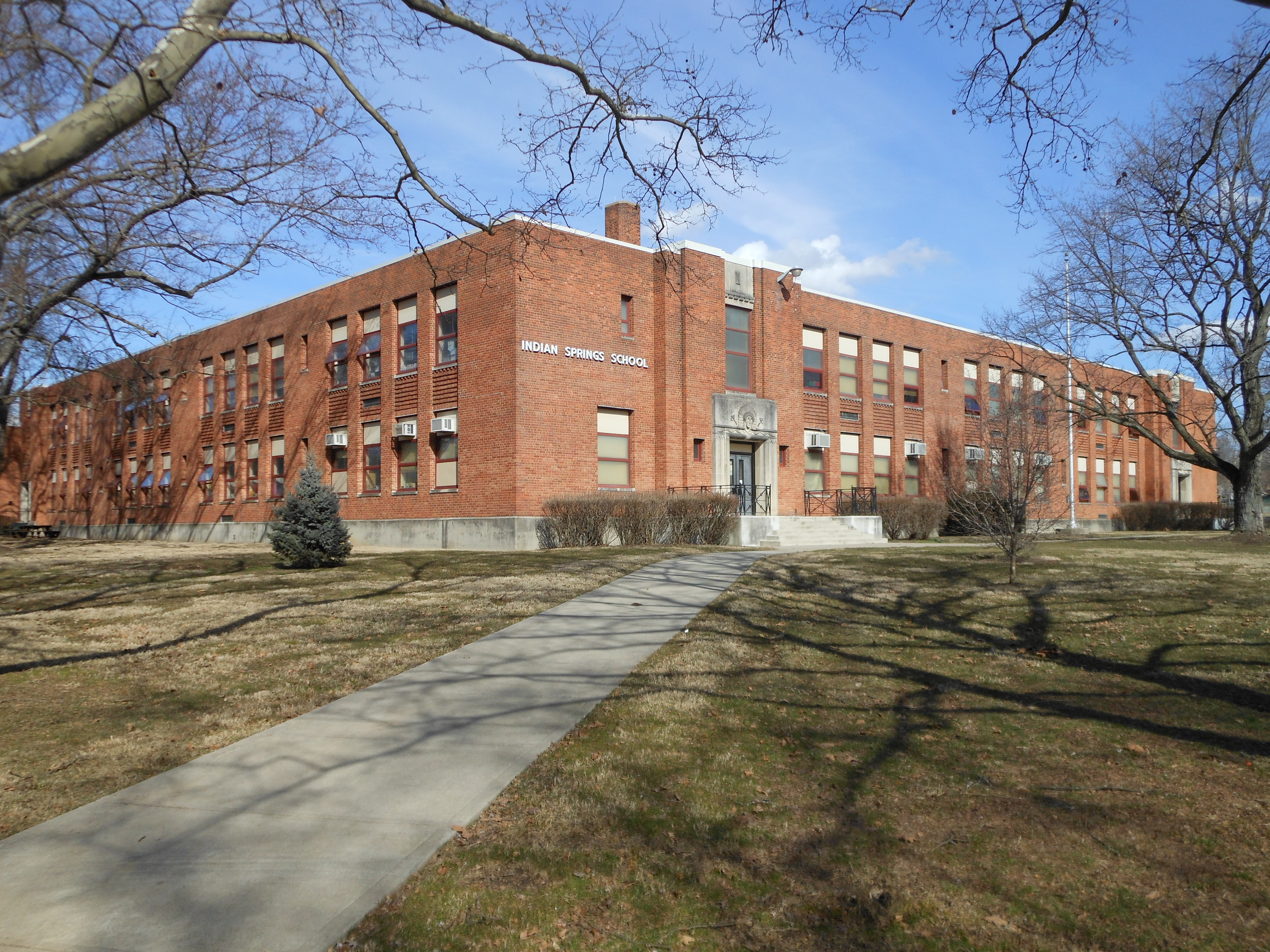
Indian Springs School

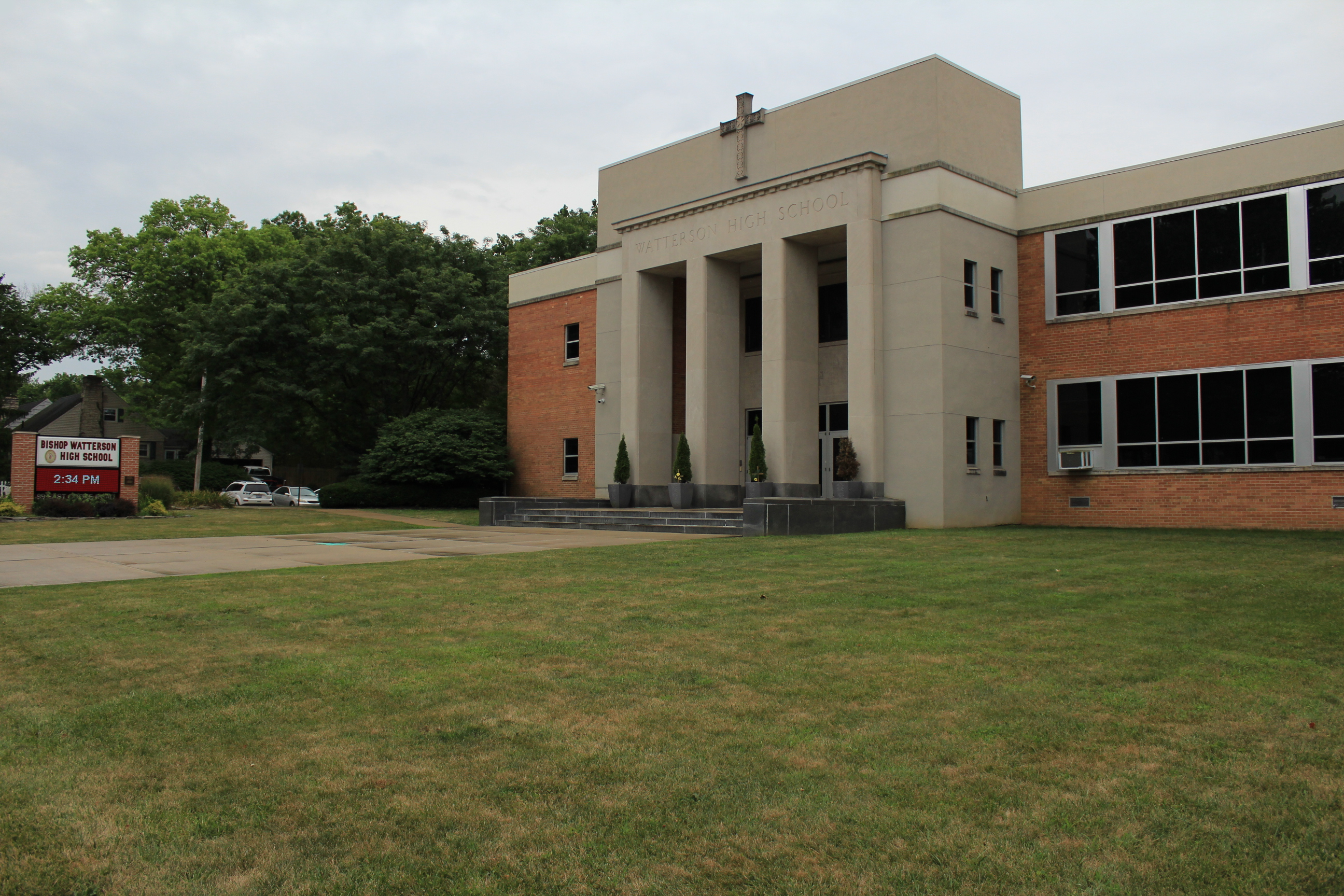
Bishop Watterson High School
