= 1915 Grand Prix season =

Grand Prix season

Seasons
- ← 1914 1916 →

The 1915 Grand Prix season saw Grand Prix motor racing continue in the United States. Racing was suspended in Europe due to the outbreak of World War I. The American Grand Prize was held in San Francisco for the first time, in conjunction with the Panama–Pacific International Exposition. Several of the latest European cars had been imported to the USA before the war started. Briton Dario Resta had a Peugeot and Ralph DePalma raced one of the Mercedes GPs. While Resta won both races at San Francisco and DePalma won the Indianapolis 500, just ahead of Resta it was Earl Cooper, running a Stutz, whose consistency gave him the unofficial AAA national championship.

== Major races ==
Date	Name	Circuit	Race Regulations	Race Distance	Winner's Time	Winning driver	Winning constructor	Report
27 Feb	(United States) VI American Grand Prize	San Francisco	AAA	400 miles	7h 08m	(United Kingdom) Dario Resta	Peugeot EX-3	Report
6 Mar	(United States) X Vanderbilt Cup	San Francisco	AAA	300 miles	4h 28m	(United Kingdom) Dario Resta	Peugeot EX-3	Report
31 May	(United States) V Indianapolis 500	Indianapolis	Indianapolis	500 miles	5h 34m	(United States) Ralph DePalma	Mercedes 18/100	Report

== Regulations and technical ==
This year the Grand Prize and Vanderbilt Cup's engine limits were both matched to those of the Indianapolis regulations - down to 450 cu in. Then Indianapolis lowered their engine limit down to 300 cu in (4.92 litres) along with the additional restriction that only three cars from each manufacturer could be entered.

The war in Europe meant some of the most technically advanced cars were sold and crossed the Atlantic, adding vitality and innovation to the American manufacturers just as they were making their own technical strides.

== Season review ==
With no racing in Europe this year because of the Great War, the only motor-racing of note was the AAA National Championship. It ran for virtually the whole length of the year, from January to November held at seventeen separate venues with a total of 27 races. Most of the venues were now wood-board or dirt ovals that gave the spectators a full view of the racing. The series was very popular with nearly 150 drivers contesting the series. Naturally the biggest fields were at the three blue riband events, the American Grand Prize, the Vanderbilt Cup and the Indianapolis 500.

The first two were held together again. This time they were in San Francisco, staged on a temporary road-course through the grounds and grand pavilions of the Panama–Pacific International Exposition. Unusually for a road-course, most of the surface was covered by wooden boards.

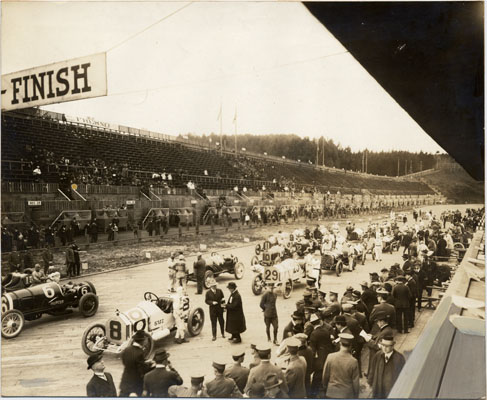
Starting grid for the American Grand Prize

A big field of 30 cars was entered for the Grand Prize. A number of American manufacturers were now producing racing cars and running works teams. Stutz had signed Howdy Wilcox, Earl Cooper and Norwegian-American Gil Andersen. Billy Carlson and Eddie Rickenbacker ran Maxwells for the United States Motor Company team, while Barney Oldfield ran one for the Maxwell company. The Duesenberg brothers had former riding mechanics Eddie O'Donnell (for Rickenbacker) and Tom Alley (for DePalma); Case ran with Harry Grant and Eddie Hearne. At the end of the abbreviated 1914 season, a few of the leading European cars had been purchased and shipped across to the United States. Ralph DePalma had upgraded his older Mercedes with the 18/100 car that Louis Wagner (or Lautenschlager) had raced at the French Grand Prix. Peugeot Auto Import entered a 7.6-litre EX-3 for Dario Resta (which had been raced by Georges Boillot at the previous year's Indianapolis race), which had been overhauled by Harry Miller. Just prepared in time, it was still in its primer-white colour. Claude Newhouse was running a Delage Type Y.

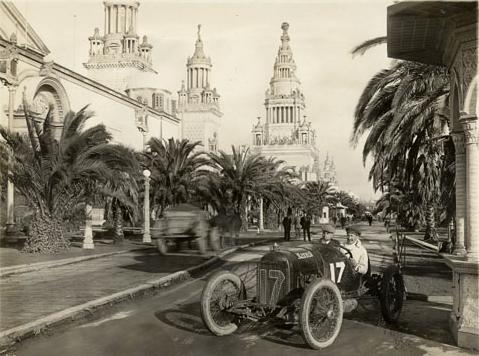
Eddie Rickenbacker - Maxwell

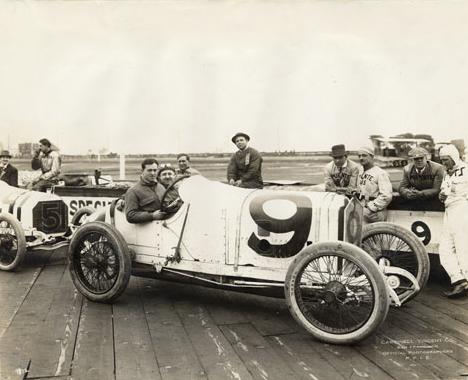
Dario Resta, winner of the Grand Prize

Barney Oldfield was fastest in qualifying, but it was British driver Dario Resta in his Peugeot that dominated the race. Half-way through a heavy storm swept across the circuit, making the wooden boards very slippery. A dozen drivers retired due to the treacherous conditions. Resta carried on to win by 6 minutes from Howdy Wilcox, with Hughie Hughes third in his FIAT Special (fitted with a Pope-Hartford engine). Only two other cars ran the full distance.

The bad weather stuck around, forcing the Vanderbilt Cup race to be postponed. Virtually the same field assembled again for the race a week later. Bob Burman ran a third car in the Case works team for the race. This time the day was sunny and warm with 100,000 spectators coming out for the event. Rickenbacker briefly led at the start until a fuel line broke, whereupon Alley took over in his Duesenberg. An exciting duel for the lead then ensued between Resta and Eddie Pullen in the Mercer as they built a two-minute lead over the chasing pack led by Burman. Then a series of accidents occurred. Alley went wide and ripped up 50 metres of fencing along the roadside, then his teammate O’Donnell hit a hay-bale and rolled but was uninjured. Soon after Cap Kennedy lost a wheel that went into the crowd injuring a spectator. The worst accident was on the 44th lap when Burman crashed and rolled his Case. Although Burman was thrown out unhurt, his mechanic suffered a broken leg and ribs.

In the latter part of the race, it was the Mercers of Pullen and Ruckstall that led the pursuit of Resta out in front. But with only five laps to go, Ruckstall's car broke its axle and then Pullen had to pit to tie down his fuel-tank that had been shaken loose. The pressure off, Resta cruised to a consecutive victory seven minutes ahead of Howdy Wilcox who inherited a lucky second place. Pullen got running again to finish third while DePalma came in fourth.

Over fifty cars were entered to qualify for the twenty-four starter places for the Indianapolis 500. This year the maximum engine size was 300 cu in, meaning that many cars in the regular AAA Championship were ineligible. Stutz entered with their three works drivers while Duesenberg added Ralph Mulford as their third driver, and the US Motor Co team added Tom Orr. The Peugeot Import Team provided Dario Resta and George C. Babcock with Peugeot EX-5s from the French Grand Prix. Ralph DePalma was racing his Mercedes GP which set up an intriguing rematch from the epic contest from the previous year. Another significant entry was from the British Sunbeam team, with two works cars for Italian Jean Porporato and British Noel van Raalte and a third privateer entry for Harry Grant. A new driver to the race was Louis Chevrolet, racing his own Cornelian car.

Fastest qualifier, taking pole position, was Howdy Wilcox in the Stutz. The front row also included DePalma (Mercedes) in second, Resta (Peugeot) third and Cooper (Stutz) on the outside and the cars were numbered according to their grid position. None of the Mercers qualified. However, after qualifying, Bob Burman's privateer special was ruled by the officials to be a Peugeot, and as that meant there were now four Peugeots in the starting line-up. One had to be dropped – and it was Jack LeCain's (although there were five Duesenberg-based chassis running). Van Raalte (travelling under his wife's surname, “Graham”, to race during wartime) had used Barney Oldfield to qualify his Sunbeam further up the grid. He was demoted back in the field to his own timed runs.

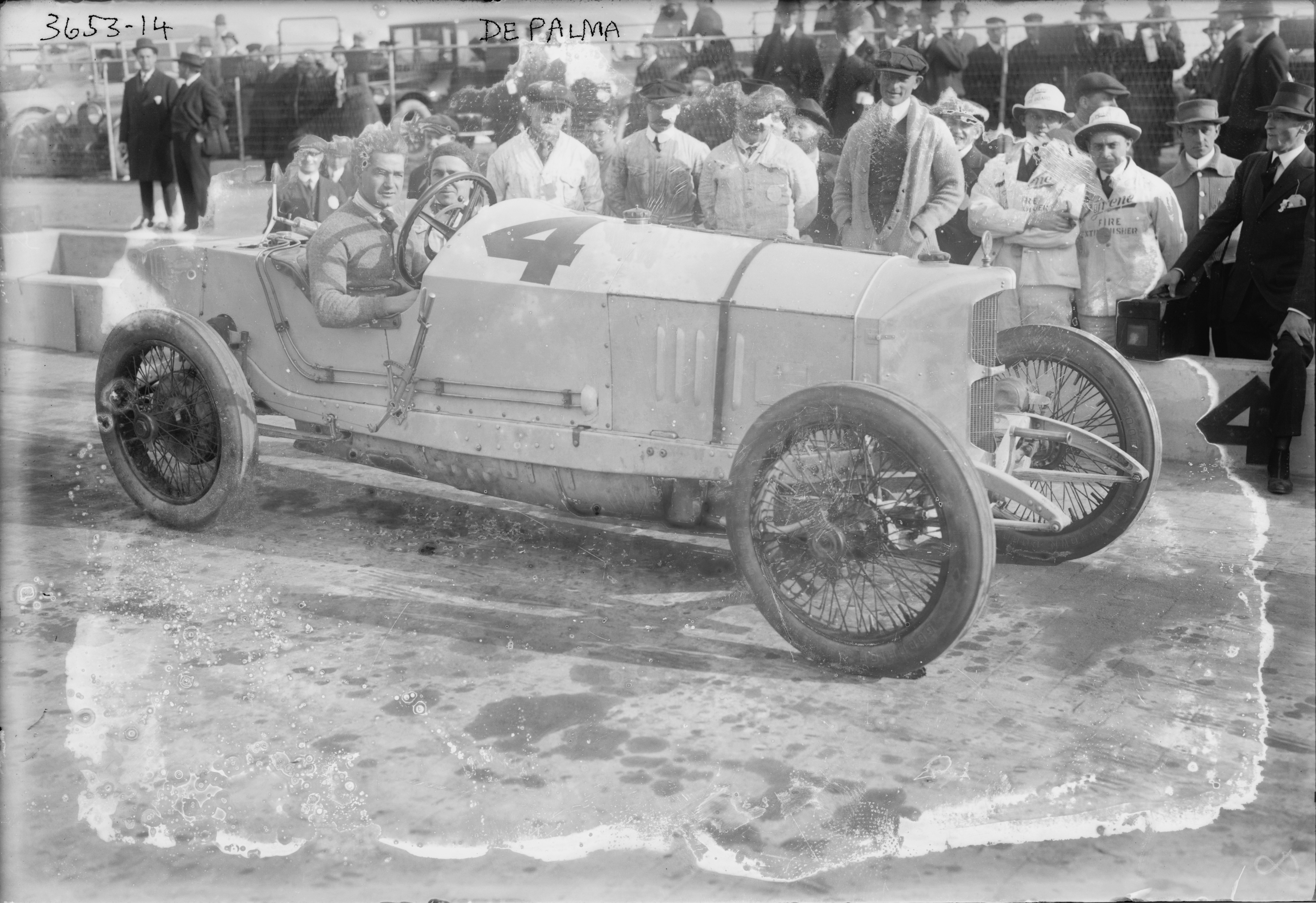
Ralph DePalma, winner of the Indianapolis 500

Race-day Saturday was stormy, so the event was postponed to the following Monday. For those spectators who did turn up on the Saturday, Ralph DePalma put on a display of his team's quick tyre-changing pit-stops – changing a front tyre in only 19 seconds. The race became a duel between Resta and DePalma. The Peugeot was faster on the straights but the Mercedes could catch up in the corners. DePalma led for a majority of the race and in the end it came down to the Peugeot's tyres again. Resta needed to take one extra pit stop and was unable to make up the time. History almost repeated for DePalma with his engine failing and running on only three cylinders. But he won by just over three minutes from Resta, with the two Stutz team-mates Andersen and Cooper (who both had Johnny Aitken as a reserve driver) finishing third and fourth over eight minutes back.

In August Resta won the first 100-mile race in less than an hour, at the Maywood board-oval near Chicago. But the lethal nature of the high-speed ovals was evident with over a dozen drivers and mechanics killed during the year. These included Harry Grant, who died in a practice crash at the Sheepshead Bay oval.

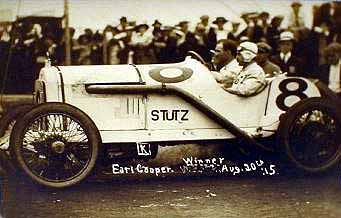
Earl Cooper, AAA Champion

As with previous editions of the series, there was no overall champion declared. However, when a retro-active points system was calculated in 1927 it was Earl Cooper who was unofficially awarded the championship after winning five races and getting four seconds. The wins included the inaugural 500-mile race at the Minneapolis speedway and the final two races of the championship. Dario Resta was beaten to second, having also won five times but only had the single second place, at Indianapolis.

Citations
