= Des Moines Speedway =

Former race track in Valley Junction, Iowa

- Location: Valley Junction, Iowa, US
- Coordinates: 41.568°N 93.725°W
- Capacity: 10,000
- Operator: Prince Speedway Company
- Broke ground: June 1, 1915
- Opened: July 25, 1915
- Closed: 1917
- Construction cost: $125,000
- Major events: Former: AAA Contest Board (1915–1916)

Oval
- Surface: Wood
- Length: 1 mi (1.6 km)
- Turns: 4
- Banking: Turns: 40°

Des Moines Speedway was a 1-mile (1.6 km) wooden board track in Valley Junction, Iowa. Constructed and opened in 1915, the speedway hosted two AAA Championship Car races in 1915 and 1916.

== History ==
The Prince Speedway Company of Chicago, owned by motorcycle road racer Jack Prince, decided to construct a board track in Valley Junction which at the time was far enough from Des Moines to not be too noisy for citizens. The track broke ground on June 1, 1915 and construction of the track used nearly one million feet of wood. The track took six weeks to build. On July 25, inaugural AAA Champ Car champion Barney Oldfield drove a two lap average speed of 103 miles per hour (166 km/h).

A 300-mile auto race sanctioned by AAA was scheduled for July 29, but was postponed to August 7 due to rain. Two weeks before the race, three motorcycle races were held. 1915 Indianapolis 500 champion Ralph DePalma made an appearance and called the track "the fastest one-mile track in the world." On lap 38, Joe Cooper's car blew a tire coming off turn four and exited the race track, falling 15 feet before the car crushed him, killing him instantly. On lap 218, Billy Chandler suffered injuries after his car flipped into the infield, however Chandler's mechanic Morris Keeler was killed. DePalma was initially called the winner of the race, but it was later declared that 1911 Vanderbilt Cup champion Ralph Mulford won the race with an average speed of 87 miles per hour (140 km/h).

For 1916, an Iowa-only race was scheduled to be held on Memorial Day. A second AAA race was scheduled for 1916 on June 24, with Eddie Rickenbacker and DePalma entered for the race. 1916 Indianapolis 500 champion Dario Resta did not enter the race because his Peugeot car was not race-ready. DePalma won the race with an average speed of 91.88 miles per hour (147.87 km/h).

In 1917, a judgement for $24,405 was brought against the track after failing to pay the land owner. The track was dismantled in November and the wood used in construction was sold (seen in an advertisement in The Des Moines Register as an "extreme bargain") and used for houses in the Valley Junction area. The land where the track once stood became a cornfield.
