= Peak Antifreeze Indy 300 =

Peak Antifreeze and Motor Oil Indy 300

IndyCar Series
- Venue: Chicagoland Speedway
- Corporate sponsor: Peak Antifreeze
- First race: 2001
- Last race: 2010
- Distance: 300 miles (480 km)
- Laps: 200
- Previous names: CART race: Target Grand Prix of Chicago Presented by Energizer (1999–2001); Grand Prix of Chicago (2002); IRL race Delphi Indy 300 (2001–2004); Peak Antifreeze Indy 300 presented by Mr. Clean (2005–2007); Peak Antifreeze & Motor Oil Indy 300 (2008–2009); Peak Antifreeze Indy 300 (2010)

The Peak Antifreeze and Motor Oil Indy 300 was an IndyCar Series race held at Chicagoland Speedway in Joliet, Illinois, United States.

In 2001, American open wheel racing debuted at the circuit with an IndyCar Series event. From 2006 to 2008, the race had served as the final round of the championship and where the series champion was decided.

Indy/Championship car racing first appeared in the Chicago area in 1914–1915 at Galesburg District Fairgrounds. Both races were 100 laps around the 1-mile (1.6 km) dirt oval. AAA held races at Speedway Park, a 2-mile (3.2 km) board track in nearby Maywood, Illinois. The first such race was a 500-mile (800 km) event in 1915. Subsequent races ranged from 10–300 miles (16–483 km), and the final race was held in 1918. The track was eventually demolished, and the Edward Hines Veterans Hospital now stands on its former location.

Although no races would be held in the Chicago area until 1999, the state of Illinois hosted numerous USAC Championship Car races at Springfield and DuQuoin.

A CART race known as the Grand Prix of Chicago was held at Chicago Motor Speedway in Cicero, just outside Chicago, from 1999 to 2002. It was discontinued, however, when the track closed after the 2002 race.

Chicagoland Speedway gained a reputation as one of the most competitive oval circuits in the IRL with many races featuring extremely tight racing and close finishes, most notably 2002, 2003, 2004, 2005, 2006, 2007 2008, 2009 and 2010. No car was able to break from the pack with most of the field usually running together and the leaders often directly nose to nose, similar to racing in NASCAR restrictor plate racing.

== Notable races ==
- 2002: Sam Hornish Jr. edged Al Unser Jr. in a photo finish, officially by .0024 seconds in a battle in which the two racers fought for the lead for the final 22 laps side by side with literally no letup and at the head of a huge ten-car two-abreast draft that included Buddy Lazier, Hélio Castroneves, Buddy Rice, Eddie Cheever Jr., and Dan Wheldon.
- 2003: Sam Hornish Jr. edged Scott Dixon and Bryan Herta in a three-abreast photo finish in one of the closest finishes in Indycar racing history—.01 seconds. Hornish, who led 40 laps, battled Tomas Scheckter (76 laps led), Dan Wheldon, and Tony Kanaan for the bulk of the race and also had to battle a late charge by Roger Yasukawa in the final six laps. The lead officially changed hands 20 times among eight drivers and was usually contested in multilap wheel-to-wheel battles inches apart.
- 2007: Dario Franchitti led Scott Dixon by three points in the championship standings going into the race, which was the finale for the season. With two laps to go, Dixon led second-place Franchitti on a restart after a late caution. Both drivers were nursing their fuel mileage, hoping to stretch it to the finish. On the final lap, going into the third turn, Dixon ran out of fuel, and Franchitti slipped by to take the lead, win the race, and win the IndyCar Series championship.
- 2008: Hélio Castroneves begun the race 30 points away from the lead, and he began from the back and charged to the lead. Scott Dixon often ran around the positions 6–10, and Castroneves was often in a points lead position. Dixon began to challenge for the lead, and after two late cautions, Dixon and Castroneves ran 2-wide for the final two laps after battling side by side for the lead for most of the previous 40 laps, and Hélio won the race by 0.0033 seconds, or 12 1/8 inches (310 mm), in the second-closest finish in the twelve-year history of the series. Dixon won the championship by 17 points.

== Past winners ==
=== AAA Championship Car history (Galesburg) ===
Season	Date	Driver	Car	Race Distance		Race Time	Average Speed (mph)
Season	Date	Driver	Car	Laps	Miles (km)	Race Time	Average Speed (mph)
1914	October 22	(United States) Ralph Mulford	Duesenberg	100	100 (160.934)	1:32:56	64.562
1915	June 9	(United States) Eddie O'Donnell	Duesenberg	100	100 (160.934)	1:36:00	62.496

=== AAA Championship Car history (Speedway Park) ===
Season	Date	Driver	Car	Race Distance		Race Time	Average Speed (mph)
Season	Date	Driver	Car	Laps	Miles (km)	Race Time	Average Speed (mph)
1915	June 26	(United Kingdom) Dario Resta	Peugeot	250	500 (804.672)	5:07:26	97.582
1915	August 7	(United Kingdom) Dario Resta	Peugeot	50	100 (160.934)	0:58:54	101.862
1916	June 11	(United Kingdom) Dario Resta	Peugeot	150	300 (482.803)	3:02:31	98.615
1916	August 19^{NC}	(United Kingdom) Dario Resta	Peugeot	25	50 (80.467)	0:29:52	100.419
1916	October 14	(United Kingdom) Dario Resta	Peugeot	125	250 (402.336)	2:24:16	103.966
1917	June 16	(United States) Earl Cooper	Stutz	125	250 (402.336)	2:25:28	103.107
1917	September 3	(United States) Ralph DePalma	Packard	25	50 (80.467)	0:28:09	106.548
1917	September 3	(United States) Louis Chevrolet	Frontenac	50	100 (160.934)	0:56:29	106.224
1917	October 13	(United States) Tom Alley	Pan-Am / Miller	10	20 (32.186)	0:11:22	105.556
1917	October 13	(United States) Ralph Mulford	Frontenac	25	50 (80.467)	0:28:18	105.960
1917	October 13	(Canada) Pete Henderson	Duesenberg	25	50 (80.467)	0:28:30	105.229
1918	June 22^{NC}	(United States) Louis Chevrolet	Frontenac	50	100 (160.934)	0:55:25	108.271
1918	July 28	(United States) Ralph DePalma	Packard	5	10 (16.093)	0:05:24	
1918	July 28	(United States) Ralph DePalma	Packard	10	20 (32.186)	0:10:50	110.73
1918	July 28	(United States) Ralph DePalma	Packard	15	30 (48.28)	0:16:54	106.42

^NC Non-championship event

=== CART Champ Car history ===
Season	Date	Driver	Team	Chassis	Engine	Race Distance		Race Time	Average Speed (mph)	Report	Ref
Season	Date	Driver	Team	Chassis	Engine	Laps	Miles (km)	Race Time	Average Speed (mph)	Report	Ref
1999	August 22	(Colombia) Juan Pablo Montoya	Chip Ganassi Racing	Reynard	Honda	225	231.525 (372.603)	1:53:38	122.236	Report	
2000	July 30	(Brazil) Cristiano da Matta	PPI Motorsports	Reynard	Toyota	225	231.525 (372.603)	2:01:23	114.432	Report	
2001	July 29	(Sweden) Kenny Bräck	Team Rahal	Lola	Ford-Cosworth	225	231.525 (372.603)	1:45:12	132.031	Report	
2002	June 30	(Brazil) Cristiano da Matta	Newman/Haas Racing	Lola	Toyota	250	257.25 (414.003)	2:07:00	121.524	Report	

=== IndyCar Series history (Chicagoland) ===
Season	Date	Driver	Team	Chassis	Engine	Race Distance		Race Time	Average Speed (mph)	Report
Season	Date	Driver	Team	Chassis	Engine	Laps	Miles (km)	Race Time	Average Speed (mph)	Report
2001	September 2	(United States) Jaques Lazier	Team Menard	Dallara	Oldsmobile	200	300 (482.803)	1:45:57	172.146	Report
2002	September 8	(United States) Sam Hornish Jr.	Panther Racing	Dallara	Chevrolet	200	300 (482.803)	2:04:40	146.319	Report
2003	September 7	(United States) Sam Hornish Jr. (2)	Panther Racing (2)	Dallara	Chevrolet	200	300 (482.803)	1:38:58	184.294	Report
2004	September 12	(Mexico) Adrian Fernández	Fernández Racing	G-Force	Honda	200	300 (482.803)	2:09:31	140.825	Report
2005	September 11	(United Kingdom) Dan Wheldon	Andretti Green Racing	Dallara	Honda	200	300 (482.803)	1:47:50	169.16	Report
2006	September 10	(United Kingdom) Dan Wheldon (2)	Chip Ganassi Racing	Dallara	Honda	200	300 (482.803)	1:33:37	194.828	Report
2007	September 9	(United Kingdom) Dario Franchitti	Andretti Green Racing (2)	Dallara	Honda	200	300 (482.803)	1:44:54	173.886	Report
2008	September 7	(Brazil) Hélio Castroneves	Team Penske	Dallara	Honda	200	300 (482.803)	2:01:05	150.648	Report
2009	August 29	(Australia) Ryan Briscoe	Team Penske (2)	Dallara	Honda	200	300 (482.803)	1:42:34	177.827	Report
2010	August 28	(United Kingdom) Dario Franchitti (2)	Chip Ganassi Racing (2)	Dallara	Honda	200	300 (482.803)	1:47:50	169.161	Report

== Support Series ==
=== Indy Pro Series/Indy Lights ===
CART Indy Lights history (Cicero)
Season	Date	Winning driver
1999	August 22	(New Zealand) Scott Dixon
2000	July 30	(New Zealand) Scott Dixon
2001	Not held	
IRL Indy Pro Series/Indy Lights Series history (Joliet)
2002	September 8	(United States) Aaron Fike
2003	September 6	(United Kingdom) Mark Taylor
2004	September 11	(Brazil) Thiago Medeiros
2005	September 11	(United States) Jeff Simmons
2006	September 9	(New Zealand) Wade Cunningham
2007	September 9	(United States) Logan Gomez
2008	September 7	(Netherlands) Arie Luyendyk Jr.
2009	August 29	(United States) Daniel Herrington
2010	August 28	(Canada) James Hinchcliffe

=== ARCA Menards Series ===
From 2001 to 2010 the ARCA Menards Series would run a race in support of the IndyCar series race.

Year	Date	Driver	Manufacturer	Race Distance		Race Time	Average Speed (mph)
Year	Date	Driver	Manufacturer	Laps	Miles (km)	Race Time	Average Speed (mph)
2001	September 1	Ed Berrier	Chevrolet	134	201 (323.478)	1:37:11	92.26
2002	September 7	Chad Blount	Dodge	134	201 (323.478)	2:06:20	95.462
2003	September 6	Frank Kimmel	Ford	134	201 (323.478)	1:55:47	104.16
2004	September 11	Kyle Krisiloff	Chevrolet	134	201 (323.478)	2:04:25	96.932
2005	September 10	Dawayne Bryan	Dodge	134	201 (323.478)	2:00:08	102.957
2006	September 9	Steve Wallace	Dodge	134	201 (323.478)	1:58:20	101.915
2007	September 8	Michael McDowell	Dodge	134	201 (323.478)	1:52:03	107.63
2008	September 6	Scott Lagasse Jr.	Chevrolet	136*	204 (328.306)	1:57:18	104.347
2009	August 28	Justin Lofton	Toyota	100	150 (241.402)	1:21:04	111.02
2010	August 27	Patrick Sheltra	Toyota	100	150 (241.402)	1:21:35	110.317

== NASCAR Gander RV & Outdoors Truck Series ==
In 2009 and 2010 the NASCAR Gander RV & Outdoors Truck Series ran a support race with the IndyCar weekend.

Year	Date	No.	Driver	Team	Manufacturer	Race Distance		Race Time	Average Speed (mph)
Year	Date	No.	Driver	Team	Manufacturer	Laps	Miles (km)	Race Time	Average Speed (mph)
2009	August 28	51	Kyle Busch	Billy Ballew Motorsports	Toyota	150	225 (362.102)	1:53:13	119.293
2010	August 27	18	Kyle Busch	Kyle Busch Motorsports	Toyota	154*	231 (371.758)	1:44:31	132.61
