= 1915 American Grand Prize =

The 1915 American Grand Prize was the first race of the 1915 Grand Prix season and was held February 27, 1915, at the Panama–Pacific International Exposition, sometimes mistakenly referred to as the San Francisco World's Fair. Unlike the previous American Grand Prize races that saw few entrants, 39 cars entered the 1915 race, 35 appeared, and 30 took the start. Rain began mid-race and 11 cars pulled off course and withdrew. Dario Resta won the race by over six minutes over Howdy Wilcox. His average speed was 56.13 mph (90.33 km/h), slowed by the rain.

== Classification ==
Pos	No	Driver	Car	Laps	Time/Retired	Grid
1	9	(United Kingdom) Dario Resta	Peugeot	104	7:07:53	13
2	26	(United States) Howdy Wilcox	Stutz	104	7:14:36	21
3	28	(United Kingdom) Hughie Hughes	Fiat-Pope-Hartford	104	7:21:46	26
4	5	(United States) Gil Andersen	Stutz	104	7:30.21	28
5	12	(United States) Louis Disbrow	Simplex	104	7:31:38	11
6	10	(United States) Louis Nikrent	Mercer	102	+2 Laps	7
7	30	(United States) Harry Grant	Case	102	+2 Laps	27
8	31	(United States) Tom McKelvey	Overland	99	+5 Laps	15
9	32	(United States) William Carlson	Maxwell	99	Withdrew - rain	9
10	15	(United States) Claude Newhouse	Delage	92	+15 Laps	3
11	3	(United States) Jack Gable	Robinson-Wisconsin	92	+15 Laps	20
12	20	(United States) Cliff Durant	Stutz	91	+16 Laps	16
13	2	(United States) Tom Alley	Duesenberg	89	Withdrew - rain	12
14	11	(United States) Cap Kennedy	Edwards	84	+20 Laps	10
15	29	(United States) William Taylor	Alco	81	+23 Laps	4
16	18	(United States) Jack LeCain	Chevrolet	81	Withdrew - rain	8
17	4	(United States) Eddie Pullen	Mercer	71	Withdrew - rain	18
18	6	(United States) Glover Ruckstell	Mercer	67	Withdrew - rain	2
19	22	(United States) Ralph DePalma	Mercedes	66	Withdrew - rain	24
20	21	(United States) Eddie Hearne	Case	64	Withdrew - rain	22
21	51	(United States) Huntley Gordon	Mercer	62	Withdrew - rain	23
22	19	(United States) Eddie O'Donnell	Duesenberg	59	Withdrew - rain	30
23	24	(United States) Jim Parsons	Stutz	55	Withdrew - rain	6
24	16	(United States) Art Klein	King-Case	51	Broken piston	25
25	17	(United States) Eddie Rickenbacker	Maxwell	41	Fouled plugs	17
26	14	(United States) Caleb Bragg	Mercer	35	Withdrew - rain	5
27	1	(United States) Barney Oldfield	Maxwell	31	Broken piston	13
28	7	(United States) Lou Gandy	Edwards	21	Contact	29
29	27	(United States) John Marquis	Bugatti	6	Ignition	19
30	8	(United States) Earl Cooper	Stutz	3	Crankcase	1
DNS		(United States) Erwin Bergdoll	Benz	0	Practice Crash	
DNS	34	(United States) T. A. Tomasini	Tomasini Special	0	Practice Crash	
DNS		(United States) Grover Bergdoll		0		
DNS		(United States) Ivan Gates	Renault	0		
DNS		(United States) Roy Francis		0		

Grand Prix Race
1915 Grand Prix season
Previous race: 1914 American Grand Prize	United States Grand Prix	Next race: 1916 American Grand Prize
