= John Mais =

John Mais may refer to:

- John Mais (gymnast), American gymnast
- John A. Mais, American auto racer
- John Mais (planter), planter, politician and slave-owner in Jamaica
