= John DePalma =

American racing driver (1885–1957)

- Born: Giovanni DePalma; April 8, 1885 Troia, Apulia, Italy
- Died: March 5, 1957 (aged 71) Los Angeles, California, U.S.

Champ Car career
- 2 races run over 2 years
- Best finish: 19th (1920)
- First race: 1915 Indianapolis 500 (Indianapolis)
- Last race: 1920 Beverly Hills 250 #1 (Beverly Hills)
Wins	Podiums	Poles
0	0	0

Giovanni "John" DePalma (occasionally spelt De Palma, April 8, 1885 – March 5, 1957) was an American racing driver.

Born in Troia, Apulia, Italy, DePalma's family emigrated to the United States in 1893. John was the younger brother of 1915 Indianapolis 500 winner Ralph DePalma, and the uncle of 1925 Indianapolis 500 winner Pete DePaolo.

== Motorsports career results ==
=== Indianapolis 500 results ===
Year	Car	Start	Qual	Rank	Finish	Laps	Led	Retired
1915	17	13	87.040	13	21	41	0	Loose flywheel
Totals						41	0	

Starts	1
Poles	0
Front Row	0
Wins	0
Top 5	0
Top 10	0
Retired	1
