= George Hill (racing driver) =

American racing driver (1886–1967)

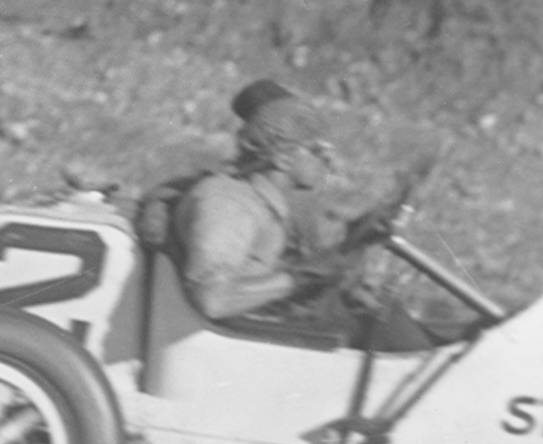
- Hill, circa 1915
- Born: George Roger Hill; October 11, 1886 Brockton, Massachusetts, U.S.
- Died: March 26, 1967 (aged 80) Santa Barbara, California, U.S.

Champ Car career
- 5 races run over 2 years
- First race: 1913 San Diego Race (San Diego)
- Last race: 1915 Montamarathon Trophy (Tacoma)
- First win: 1913 San Diego Race (San Diego)
Wins	Podiums	Poles
1	3	0

George Roger Hill (October 11, 1886 – March 26, 1967) was an American racing driver and mechanic.

== Biography ==
George Hill was born on October 11, 1886, in Brockton, Massachusetts. Hill began his career as the racing mechanic for Barney Oldfield. He relocated to California to work at Harry Miller's car company, where Hill's expertise in carburetors contributed to advancements in racing technology. Hill briefly competed as a driver, his primary focus was on automotive engineering. He won an AAA-sanctioned race in San Diego in 1913 but shifted his attention to his work with Miller by 1915. Hill served in the World War I. He died in Santa Barbara, California.

== Motorsports career results ==
=== Indianapolis 500 results ===
Year	Car	Start	Qual	Rank	Finish	Laps	Led	Retired
1915	26	22	81.520	22	23	20	0	Water pump gear
Totals						20	0	

Starts	1
Poles	0
Front Row	0
Wins	0
Top 5	0
Top 10	0
Retired	1
