= George Babcock =

George Babcock may refer to:

- George Babcock (American football) (1899–1988), American football player and coach
- George Herman Babcock (1832–1893), American inventor
- George R. Babcock (1806–1876), New York politician
- George C. Babcock (1876–1921), American racecar driver
- George Wait Babcock (1751–1816), American privateer of the American Revolution
