= Thomas Orr =

Thomas Orr may refer to:

- Tommy Orr (1924–1972), Scottish footballer
- Tom Orr (1877–1954), American driver
- Thomas Orr (politician), South Africa minister of finance
- Tom Orr, mayor of Cambridge, Ohio
