= Omaha Speedway =

Motorsport track in the United States

- Location: Carter Lake, Iowa
- Coordinates: 41.293°N 95.921°W
- Broke ground: October 15, 1914
- Opened: November 26, 1914; July 5, 1915
- Closed: September 1917
- Architect: Jack Prince; C. R. Vaughn
- Major events: AAA Champ Car

Oval
- Surface: Wood
- Length: 1.25 mi (2.01 km)
- Banking: Turns: 42° Straights: 10°

Oval
- Surface: Dirt
- Length: 0.50 mi (0.80 km)

Omaha Speedway was a wooden board track in Carter Lake, Iowa, which was part of Council Bluffs, Iowa at the time, near East Omaha, Nebraska. It hosted AAA Champ Car races from 1915 to 1917.

== History ==
The construction of the timber track on a 120-acre (49 ha) site began in mid-October 1914 under the direction of Jack Prince, promoter and speedway builder, who employed the "triple radius corner" concept so that cars could enter the straightaways at full throttle. The dedication of the new oval on Thanksgiving Day was marred by the death of a motorcyclist when Roy Milner was killed on a trial run in front of 1,500 attendees. The scheduled motorcycle races were canceled, but an air show went ahead. Work on the track resumed, though, and in mid-June 1915, C. R. Vaughn, the contractor who was assigned to complete the speedway, had almost finished the surface and the underground auto tunnel while the grandstands were still being built.

The inaugural event was held on July 5, 1915 when 30,000 spectators watched former Omaha resident Eddie Rickenbacker win a 300-mile race with an average speed exceeding 91 miles per hour (146 km/h). Many fans were left disappointed, however, for only eight of 19 contracted drivers had started the race after several cars had been damaged at the previous meetings at Chicago and Sioux City.

The unfortunate situation was addressed in the newspapers in advance of the July 1916 event with the public being informed of the arrangements made to avoid another failure. The 150-mile race, in which Aldo Franchi's mechanician, Dan Colombo, sustained fatal crash injuries, was won by Dario Resta, and the subsequent 50-mile race was taken by Ralph DePalma, both drivers averaging more than 98 mph (158 km/h).

With the boards beginning to crumble and necessitating occasional repairs, it was decided to demolish the track and sell its lumber after the 1917 Independence Day event. Ralph Mulford was awarded first place in the 150-mile race, having averaged above 101 mph (163 km/h), while Dave Lewis prevailed in the 50-mile race, averaging more than 103 mph (166 km/h). Mulford's win was protested by the Mercer team, which claimed the top two positions, but after a review of the lap times the result stood.

Another event, a 100-mile motorcycle race, was staged on September 9, 1917 and saw Ray Weishaar gain the "Western Championship" with an average speed exceeding 80 mph (130 km/h). The track was dismantled later in the year.
