= Frances Bagley =

American sculptor (born 1946)

- The Portrait by Frances Bagley, 1997, stainless steel and marble sculpture, El Paso Museum of Art
- Born: April 7, 1946 (age 80); Fayetteville, Tennessee
- Education: Arizona State University, University of North Texas
- Known for: Sculpture
- Spouse: Tom Orr

Frances Bagley (born April 7, 1946) is an American sculptor who was born in Fayetteville, Tennessee. Her sculptures are made from many different materials including metal, stone, human hair and fabric. Recently she has also included video into her art. She lives and works in Dallas, Texas.

== Education ==
Bagley initially went to the University of Tennessee with a scholarship for journalism. However, after taking an art course there, she says that she was "hooked" on art.

Bagley received a BFA in painting from Arizona State University (Tempe, Arizona) in 1969. Bagley realized that her paintings were really two-dimensional ideas about objects she wished to build. In 1971, she received an MA from Arizona State University and in 1980 an MFA in sculpture from the University of North Texas (Denton, Texas).

== Career and art ==
Bagley's sculptures are both abstract and figurative. She says, "My abstract figures attempt to speak of the human spirit as an icon of human experience, although frozen outside time." The Portrait, made of unpolished marble, evokes classical sculpture with a modern, abstract sensibility. Bagley cites artists Louise Bourgeois and Francis Bacon as two of her favorite artistic inspirations.

In 2008, Bagley was the first American to win an award from the Kajima Sculpture Exhibition held biannually in Tokyo.

Bagley has also created public sculpture and art projects. In 2015, a 14-year-old public art created with in collaboration with Tom Orr and located at White Rock Lake in Dallas was recently the cause of controversy when the city of Dallas determined that it did not have the funds available to restore the art and that it must be demolished. A compromise was reached: Dallas will commission another work from Bagley and Orr.

Another collaborative project that Bagley and Orr worked on was the creation of sets and costumes for the Dallas Opera's 50th Anniversary and performance of Verdi's Nabucco. The design and creation of the sets and costumes took more than a year to complete.

The Arkansas Arts Center (Little Rock, AR), the City of Dallas, Texas, Del Mar College (Corpus Christi, TX), the El Paso Museum of Art, the National Museum of Women in the Arts and the University of Texas at Arlington are among the public collections holding work by Frances Bagley. Many corporate entities also collect her art.
