= C. C. Cox =

American racing driver (1887–1915)

- Born: Charles Carr Cox; October 17, 1887 Randolph, Ohio, U.S.
- Died: July 4, 1915 (aged 27) Sioux City, Iowa, U.S.

Champ Car career
- 2 races run over 1 year
- First race: 1915 Indianapolis 500 (Indianapolis)
- Last race: 1915 Sioux City 300 (Sioux City)
| Wins | Podiums | Poles |
|---|---|---|
| 0 | 0 | 0 |

Charles Carr Cox (October 17, 1887 – July 4, 1915) was an American racing driver who competed in the 1915 Indianapolis 500. Later that year, he died as a result of injuries sustained in a crash during a 300-mile (480 km) race at Sioux City Speedway.

== Motorsports career results ==
=== Indianapolis 500 results ===
| Year | Car | Start | Qual | Rank | Finish | Laps | Led | Retired |
|---|---|---|---|---|---|---|---|---|
| 1915 | 25 | 21 | 81.520 | 21 | 24 | 12 | 0 | Timing gears |
| Totals | | | | | | 12 | 0 | |

| Starts | 1 |
| Poles | 0 |
| Front Row | 0 |
| Wins | 0 |
| Top 5 | 0 |
| Top 10 | 0 |
| Retired | 1 |
