= John A. Mais =

German racing driver (1888–1961)

John Mais
- Born: Johann Anton Mais; 11 June 1888 Koblenz, Rhine Province, Prussia, German Empire
- Died: 26 May 1961 (aged 72) Koblenz, Rhineland-Palatinate, Germany

Champ Car career
- 2 races run over 1 year
- First race: 1915 Indianapolis 500 (Indianapolis)
- Last race: 1915 Galesburg 100 (Galesburg)
Wins	Podiums	Poles
0	0	0

John Anthony Mais (born Johann Anton, 11 June 1888 – 26 May 1961) was a German racing driver.

== Motorsports career results ==
=== Indianapolis 500 results ===
Year	Car	Start	Qual	Rank	Finish	Laps	Led	Retired
1915	24	19	81.970	19	22	23	0	Left course
Totals						23	0	

Starts	1
Poles	0
Front Row	0
Wins	0
Top 5	0
Top 10	0
Retired	1
