= 1918 AAA Championship Car season =

Auto racing season

- AAA National Championship Trail

Season
- Races: 16
- Start date: May 16
- End date: September 2

Awards
- National champion: none declared
- Indianapolis 500 winner: event not held

The 1918 AAA Championship Car season consisted of 16 races, beginning in Uniontown, Pennsylvania on May 16 and concluding there on September 2. There were also 3 non-championship races. AAA did not award points towards a National Championship during the 1918 season, and did not declare a National Champion.

The de facto National Champion as polled by the American automobile journal Motor Age, was Ralph Mulford. Mulford was named the champion by Chris G. Sinsabaugh, an editor at Motor Age, based upon merit and on track performance. A points table was created retroactively in 1927. At a later point, it was recognized by historians that these championship results should be considered unofficial.

== Schedule and results ==
Date	Race Name Distance (miles)	Track	Location	Type	Notes	Pole position	Winning driver
May 16	Liberty Sweepstakes Heat 1 (27)	Uniontown Speedway	Uniontown, Pennsylvania	1.125 mile board oval			Tommy Milton
May 16	Liberty Sweepstakes Heat 2 (27)	Uniontown Speedway	Uniontown, Pennsylvania	1.125 mile board oval			Ralph Mulford
May 16	Liberty Sweepstakes Heat 3 (27)	Uniontown Speedway	Uniontown, Pennsylvania	1.125 mile board oval			Eddie Hearne
May 16	Liberty Sweepstakes Heat 4 (27)	Uniontown Speedway	Uniontown, Pennsylvania	1.125 mile board oval			Louis Chevrolet
May 16	Liberty Sweepstakes Main (27)	Uniontown Speedway	Uniontown, Pennsylvania	1.125 mile board oval			Ralph Mulford
June 1	Harkness Handicap (100)	Sheepshead Bay Speedway	Sheepshead Bay, New York	2 mile board oval	Non-championship event		Ralph DePalma
June 22	Chicago 100 (100)	Speedway Park	Maywood, Illinois	2 mile board oval	Non-championship event		Louis Chevrolet
July 4	Liberty Handicap (100)	Cincinnati Motor Speedway	Sharonville, Ohio	2 mile board oval	Non-championship event		Ralph DePalma
July 4	Tacoma Race 1 (24)	Pacific Coast Speedway	Tacoma, Washington	2 mile board oval			Cliff Durant
July 4	Tacoma Race 2 (50)	Pacific Coast Speedway	Tacoma, Washington	2 mile board oval			Cliff Durant
July 4	Tacoma Race 3 (75)	Pacific Coast Speedway	Tacoma, Washington	2 mile board oval			Eddie Hearne
July 18	Independence Auto Derby (112.5)	Uniontown Speedway	Uniontown, Pennsylvania	1.125 mile board oval			Louis Chevrolet
July 28	Chicago Race 1 (10)	Speedway Park	Maywood, Illinois	2 mile board oval			Ralph DePalma
July 28	Chicago Race 2 (20)	Speedway Park	Maywood, Illinois	2 mile board oval			Ralph DePalma
July 28	Chicago Race 3 (30)	Speedway Park	Maywood, Illinois	2 mile board oval			Ralph DePalma
August 17	International Sweepstakes Race 1 (20)	Sheepshead Bay Speedway	Sheepshead Bay, New York	2 mile board oval			Ralph DePalma
August 17	International Sweepstakes Race 2 (30)	Sheepshead Bay Speedway	Sheepshead Bay, New York	2 mile board oval			Ralph DePalma
August 17	International Sweepstakes Race 3 (50)	Sheepshead Bay Speedway	Sheepshead Bay, New York	2 mile board oval			Ralph DePalma
September 2	Liberty Sweepstakes (112.5)	Uniontown Speedway	Uniontown, Pennsylvania	1.125 mile board oval			Ralph Mulford

== Leading National Championship standings ==
The points paying system for the 1909–1915 and 1917–1919 season were retroactively applied in 1927 and revised in 1951 using the points system from 1920.

#	Driver	Sponsor	Points
1	Ralph Mulford	Frontenac	515
2	Louis Chevrolet	Frontenac	485
3	Eddie Hearne	Duesenberg	350
4	Ralph DePalma	Packard	320
5	Cliff Durant	Chevrolet	230
