= Harkness Trophy Race =

1910s American auto racing event

The Harkness Trophy Race was an American auto racing event, first run in 1915 at the Sheepshead Bay Speedway at Sheepshead Bay, New York. The winner's trophy was named for Harry Harkness, one of the principal investors who purchased the Sheepshead Bay Race Track horse racing facility, and converted it to a wooden board automobile race track.

The purchase was completed in April 1915, and the first race named for Harkness was held on November 2 of that year.

The race ceased to exist after four years. The Sheepshead Bay Speedway Corporation ran into financial difficulties, following the January, 1919, death of Harry Harkness. The property was sold for residential real estate development.

== Race results ==
| Year | Date | Race Name | Winning Driver | Car | Race Distance | | Time of Race | Winning Speed |
| Year | Date | Race Name | Winning Driver | Car | Miles | Laps | Time of Race | Winning Speed |
|---|---|---|---|---|---|---|---|---|
| 1915 | Nov 2 | Harkness Gold Medal Race | (United Kingdom) Dario Resta | Peugeot | 100 | 50 | 00:56:55.71 | 105.395 mph |
| 1916 | Oct 28 | Harkness Trophy Race | (United States) Johnny Aitken | Peugeot | 100 | 50 | 00:56:37.65 | 105.956 mph |
| 1917 | Sept 22 | Harkness Trophy Race | (United States) Louis Chevrolet | Frontenac | 100 | 50 | 00:54:20.98 | 110.396 mph |
| 1918 | June 1 | Harkness Auto Handicap | (United States) Ralph DePalma | Packard | 100 | 50 | 00:58:21 | 102.8 mph |

== Sources ==
http://www.champcarstats.com

Galpin, Darren; A Record of Motorsport Racing Before World War I.

Harry S. Harkness dies of Influenza, New York Times, January 24, 1919
