= Noel van Raalte =

British racing driver (1888–1940)

- Born: Marcus Noel van Raalte; 22 December 1888 Paddington, London, England
- Died: 5 May 1940 (aged 51) Kensington, London, England

Champ Car career
- 2 races run over 1 year
- First race: 1915 Indianapolis 500 (Indianapolis)
- Last race: 1915 Chicago 500 (Speedway Park)
Wins	Podiums	Poles
0	0	0

Marcus Noel van Raalte (22 December 1888 – 5 May 1940) was a British racing driver and playboy.

== Biography ==
Van Raalte's family owned Brownsea Island. When Robert Baden-Powell held (at van Raalte's parents' invitation) the experimental Camp on Brownsea Island, van Raalte was 19 and helped with the Camp. In 1910, Baden-Powell planned to take a Troop of Boy Scouts on a tour of Canada as an introduction to the Scout Movement. van Raalte was one of the party. In 1912, Baden-Powell went on a lecture tour of the U.S.A.; he travelled via the Caribbean on the S.S. Arcadia (and met his wife on the voyage). van Raalte went too, as A.D.C. to Baden-Powell. These two tours introduced van Raalte to North America.

Van Raalte raced in the 1915 Indianapolis 500 in a Sunbeam, finishing in 10th place. He later owned the first Bentley automobile.

== Motorsports career results ==
=== Indianapolis 500 results ===
Year	Car	Start	Qual	Rank	Finish	Laps	Led	Retired
1915	7	14	86.870	14	10	200	0	Running
Totals						200	0	

Starts	1
Poles	0
Front Row	0
Wins	0
Top 5	0
Top 10	1
Retired	0
