= Glover Ruckstell =

American racing driver (1891–1963)

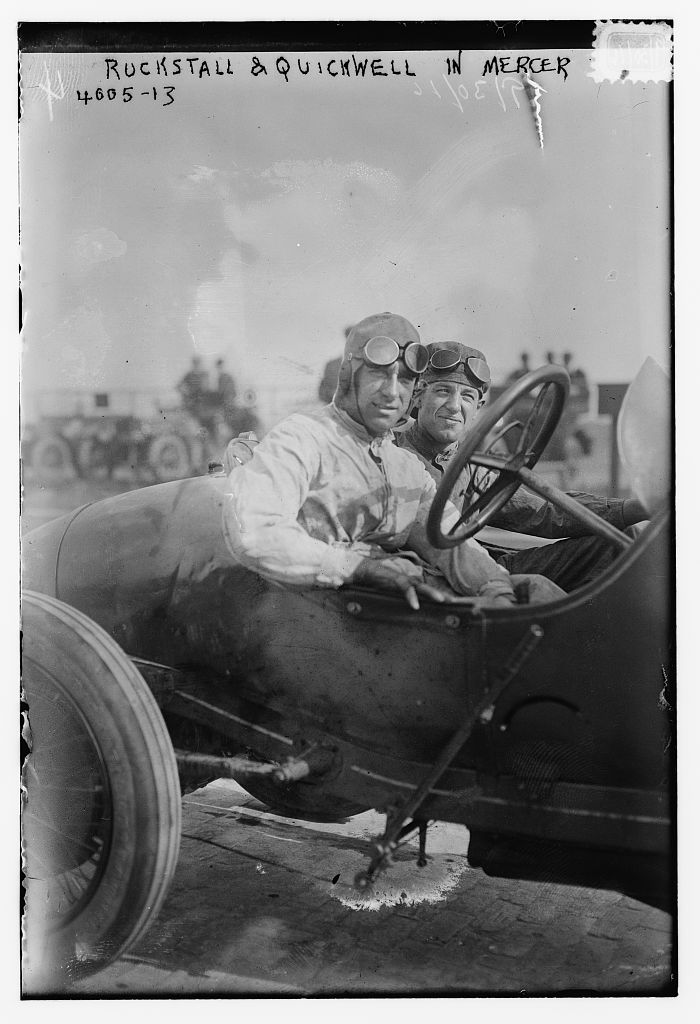
- Ruckstell (left), circa 1916
- Born: Glover Edwin Ruckstell; May 5, 1891 San Francisco, California, U.S.
- Died: May 28, 1963 (aged 72) Riverside, California, U.S.

Champ Car career
- 13 races run over 3 years
- Best finish: 27th (tie) (1916)
- First race: 1914 Golden Potlach Trophy (Tacoma)
- Last race: 1916 Championship Award; Sweepstakes (Ascot Speedway)
- First win: 1915 Montamarathon Trophy (Tacoma)
Wins	Podiums	Poles
1	3	0

Glover Edwin Ruckstell (May 5, 1891 – May 28, 1963) was an American racing driver and engineer. He is best known as the inventor of the Ruckstell Axle for use on Ford motor vehicles.

== Biography ==
Ruckstell was born in San Francisco, California to John R. Ruckstell and Eleanor G. Brown. He completed two years of high school and then dropped out. By 1914 he was working as an engineer and a race car driver. Though not a full-time driver, he managed the Mercer team which competed in the 1915 Indianapolis 500.

In 1917, Ruckstell became the assistant to Lieutenant Colonel Elbert J. Hall for tests on the Liberty L-12 aircraft engine. As the head of Hall-Scott airplane development, he co-designed the Hall-Scott L-6 Aircraft Engine using Liberty L-12 components as well as the Hall-Scott LM-6 Marine Engine. Ruckstell became a Commissioned Captain of the United States Army Air Service in aircraft production in 1918, where he was in charge of the construction of the De Havilland airplane production at the Dayton-Wright Airplane Company.

During the 1920s, he founded the Ruckstell Corporation and became its president and general manager. As president of the company, he designed the Ruckstell Axle, a planetary gearing installed in the rear axle of the Ford Model T passenger car and Ford Model TT truck, and the Ruckstell-Burkhardt Auxiliary Aircraft Engines.

In the 1930s, he was awarded Commercial Pilot’s License #10,006 C.A.A. and became president and the general manager of Grand Canyon Airlines. In the mid-1930s Ruckstell became president of the Ruckstell-Burkhardt Engineering Company and he negotiated the contract and operated the Boulder Dam Recreational Area, under the Department of the Interior.

Ruckstell died on May 28, 1963 in Riverside, California. He was buried in Desert Memorial Park in Cathedral City, California.

== Legacy ==
Ruckstell's papers are archived at the San Diego Air and Space Museum Library and Archives.
