= Jean Porporato =

French racing driver (1879–unknown)

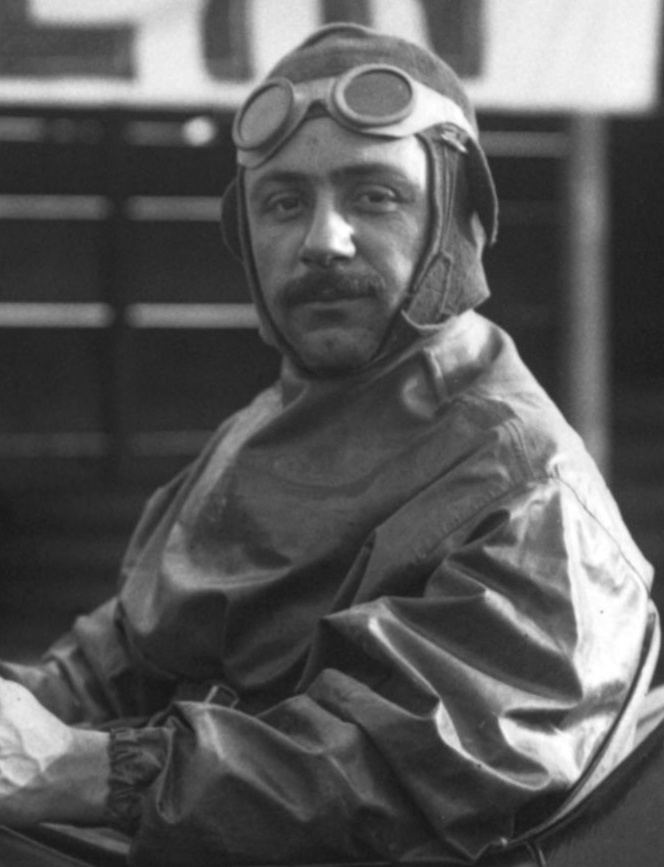
- Porporato in 1908
- Born: Giovanni Giacomo Bernardo Porporato; 3 November 1879 Turin, Piedmont, Italy
- Died: unknown

Champ Car career
- 3 races run over 2 years
- First race: 1915 Indianapolis 500 (Indianapolis)
- Last race: 1920 Indianapolis 500 (Indianapolis)
Wins	Podiums	Poles
0	1	0

24 Hours of Le Mans career
- Years: 1925
- Teams: D.F.P.
- Best finish: DNF (1925)
- Class wins: 0

Jean Porporato (born Giovanni Giacomo Bernardo Porporato, 3 November 1879 – unknown) was a French racing driver and mechanic. He was born in Turin, but lived much of his life in Lyon, Rhône.

== Racing career ==
Porporato is mentioned in automobile press articles from 28 January 1906, where he is listed as a mechanic of the racing driver Paul Bablot on the occasion of the endurance record in a Berliet 16 to 22 horsepower (12 to 16 kW) car on the route from Salon to Arles.

Paul Bablot (1873–1932), the Berliet agent at Marseille, was the named driver for the Berliet marque in competition from 1904 (Mont Ventoux race, France) until 1906 with the Targa Florio and the Tourist Trophy, and one more time in 1908 with a victory in the Boulevard Michelet Hillclimb of Marseille.

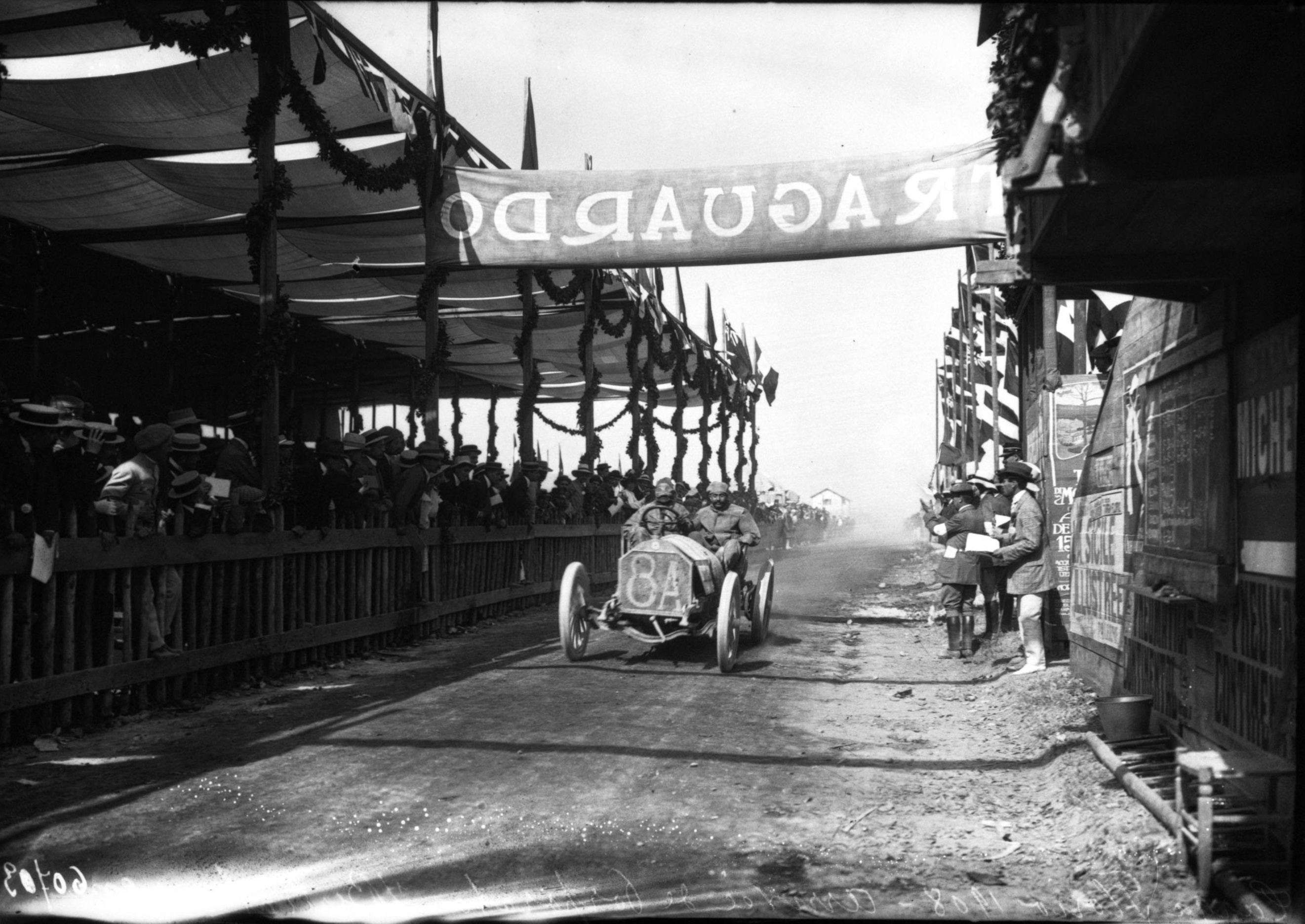
Porporato finishing fourth at the 1908 Targa Florio

Porporato, as fine-tuner and driver, drove Berliet cars in competition from 1907 until 1911. In the 1907 season, he raced in the Targa Florio race, from which he retired. In the 1908 season, he reached fourth place in the Targa Florio and competed in the Targa Bologna, achieving his only victory in the Berliet. In 1911, he appeared in the Coup de Voiturettes. In this race, he came fifth in the 1913 season and ninth in the 1914 season.

Porporato also competed in the Indianapolis 500 of 1915 and 1920, on both occasions failing to finish. In 1923 and 1924, he drove La Buire cars, notably at the French Grand Prix in Lyon in 1924. In his last, and most important, race, the 1925 24 Hours of Le Mans, he retired.

== Motorsports career results ==
=== Indianapolis 500 results ===
Year	Car	Start	Qual	Rank	Finish	Laps	Led	Retired
1915	6	6	94.740	6	14	164	0	Piston
1920	19	22	79.980	22	22	23	0	Ruled off
Totals						187	0	

Starts	2
Poles	0
Front Row	0
Wins	0
Top 5	0
Top 10	0
Retired	2
