= John Mais (planter) =

Planter and politician in Jamaica

John Mais (c. 1778-1853) was a planter and slave-owner in Jamaica. He was elected to the House of Assembly of Jamaica in 1820 for the parish of Saint Andrew.
