= 1915 AAA Championship Car season =

Auto racing season

- AAA National Championship Trail

Season
- Races: 27
- Start date: January 9
- End date: November 25

Awards
- National champion: none declared
- Indianapolis 500 winner: (United States) Ralph DePalma

The 1915 AAA Championship Car season consisted of 27 races, beginning in San Diego, California on January 9 and concluding in San Francisco, California on November 25. The AAA did not award points towards a National Championship during the 1915 season and did not declare a National Champion. Ralph DePalma won the International 500 Mile Sweepstakes.

Earl Cooper was named the de facto National Champion by the American automobile journal Motor Age. Points were not awarded by the AAA Contest Board during the 1915 season. Cooper was named champion by Chris G. Sinsabaugh, an editor at Motor Age, based on merit and on-track performance. A points table was created retroactively in 1927. Historians later recognized that these championship results should be considered unofficial.

== Schedule and results ==
Date	Race Name Distance (miles)	Track	Location	Type	Notes	Pole position	Winning driver
January 9	San Diego Exposition Road Race (305)	Point Loma Road Race Course	San Diego, California	5.982 mile road course			Earl Cooper
February 3	Tropico Road Race (101)	Tropico Road	Tropico, California	1.906 mile road course			Eddie O'Donnell
February 7	Ascot Race (100)	Ascot Speedway	South Los Angeles, California	1 mile dirt oval	Jack Callaghan fatally injured		Eddie O'Donnell
February 27	American Grand Prize (406)	Panama–Pacific International Exposition	San Francisco, California	3.905 mile road course	ACA sanction	Earl Cooper	Dario Resta
March 6	William K. Vanderbilt Cup (301)	Panama–Pacific International Exposition	San Francisco, California	3.849 mile road course	600 cu in.	Barney Oldfield	Dario Resta
March 17	Venice Race (301)	Venice Road Race Course	Venice, California	3.105 mile road course		Cliff Durant	Barney Oldfield
March 20	Tucson Race (103)	Tucson Road Race Course	Tucson, Arizona	4.298 mile road course			Barney Oldfield
April 29	Southern Sweepstakes Road Race (200)	Oklahoma City Road Race Course	Oklahoma City, Oklahoma	2.404 mile road course		John Raimey	Bob Burman
May 31	International 500 Mile Sweepstakes	Indianapolis Motor Speedway	Speedway, Indiana	2.5 mile brick oval	24-car field	Howdy Wilcox	Ralph DePalma
June 9	Galesburg Race (100)	Galesburg District Fairgrounds	Galesburg, Illinois	1 mile dirt oval		Tom Alley	Eddie O'Donnell
June 26	Chicago Race (500)	Speedway Park	Maywood, Illinois	2 mile board oval		Dario Resta	Dario Resta
July 3	Sioux City Race (300)	Sioux City Speedway	North Sioux City, South Dakota	2 mile dirt oval	450 cu in.; C. C. Cox fatally injured		Eddie Rickenbacker
July 4	Montamarathon Trophy Race (250)	Pacific Coast Speedway	Tacoma, Washington	2 mile board oval	650 cu in.; Billy Carlson and his riding mechanic Paul Franzen fatally injured		Glover Ruckstell
July 5	Golden Potlach Trophy Race (200)	Pacific Coast Speedway	Tacoma, Washington	2 mile board oval			Eddie Pullen
July 5	Omaha Race (300)	Omaha Speedway	Omaha, Nebraska	1.25 mile board oval		Eddie O'Donnell	Eddie Rickenbacker
July 9	Burlington Race (100)	Tri-State Fair Grounds	Burlington, Iowa	0.5 mile dirt oval			Bob Burman
August 7	Des Moines Race (300)	Des Moines Speedway	Valley Junction, Iowa	1 mile board oval	300 cu in.; Joe Cooper and Maurice Keeler, riding mechanic for Billy Chandler, fatally injured		Ralph Mulford
August 7	Challenge Cup Match Race (100)	Speedway Park	Maywood, Illinois	2 mile board oval	600 cu in.	Barney Oldfield	Dario Resta
August 20	Chicago Auto Club Trophy Race (300)	Elgin Road Race Course	Elgin, Illinois	8.384 mile road course	300 cu in.		Earl Cooper
August 21	Elgin National Trophy Race (300)	Elgin Road Race Course	Elgin, Illinois	8.384 mile road course	450 cu in.		Gil Andersen
August 28	Kalamazoo Race (100)	Recreation Park	Kalamazoo, Michigan	1 mile dirt oval	Free-for-all		Ralph DePalma
September 4	Minneapolis Race (500)	Twin City Motor Speedway	Minneapolis, Minnesota	2 mile concrete oval	300 cu in.	Dario Resta	Earl Cooper/Johnny Aitken
September 18	Providence Race (100)	Narragansett Park Speedway	Cranston, Rhode Island	1 mile concrete oval			Eddie Rickenbacker
October 9	Astor Cup (350)	Sheepshead Bay Speedway	Sheepshead Bay, New York	2 mile board oval	300 cu in.; Harry Grant fatally injured in practice	Dario Resta	Gil Andersen
November 2	Harkness Gold Medal Race (100)	Sheepshead Bay Speedway	Sheepshead Bay, New York	2 mile board oval		Ralph DePalma	Dario Resta
November 20	Phoenix Race (109)	Arizona State Fairgrounds	Phoenix, Arizona	1 mile dirt oval	Scheduled for 150 miles; ended early due to darkness.		Earl Cooper
November 25	San Francisco Race 3 (100)	Panama–Pacific International Exposition	San Francisco, California	1 mile dirt oval			Earl Cooper

== Leading National Championship standings ==
The points-paying system for the 1909–1915 and 1917–1919 seasons was retroactively applied in 1927 and revised in 1951 using the points system from 1920.

#	Driver	Sponsor	Points
1	Earl Cooper	Stutz	3780
2	Dario Resta	Peugeot	3320
3	Gil Andersen	Stutz	2590
4	Eddie O'Donnell	Duesenberg	2285
5	Eddie Rickenbacker	Maxwell	1765

== General references ==
- http://www.champcarstats.com/year/1915.htm accessed 8/21/15
- http://www.teamdan.com/archive/gen/indycar/1915.html accessed 8/21/15
