= Joe Cooper (racing driver) =

American racing driver (1888–1915)

- Born: Joseph Lawrence Hoover; September 18, 1888 New Castle, Pennsylvania, U.S.
- Died: August 7, 1915 (aged 26) Valley Junction, Iowa, U.S.

Champ Car career
- 7 races run over 1 year
- First race: 1915 Indianapolis 500 (Indianapolis)
- Last race: 1915 Des Moines 300 (Valley Junction)
Wins	Podiums	Poles
0	0	0

Joseph Lawrence Cooper (born Joseph Lawrence Hoover, September 18, 1888 – August 7, 1915) was an American racecar driver. Cooper was killed in a race in West Des Moines.

== Motorsports career results ==
=== Indianapolis 500 results ===
Year	Car	Start	Qual	Rank	Finish	Laps	Led	Retired
1915	18	15	85.550	15	15	154	0	Crash SC
Totals						154	0	

Starts	1
Poles	0
Front Row	0
Wins	0
Top 5	0
Top 10	0
Retired	1
