= AAA Contest Board =

Former auto racing sanctioning body

The AAA Contest Board was the motorsports arm of the American Automobile Association. The contest board sanctioned automobile races from 1904 until 1955, establishing American Championship car racing. Modern-day Indy Car racing racing traces its roots directly to these AAA events.

All of the races at the Indianapolis Motor Speedway during that time period were sanctioned by AAA, including the Indianapolis 500. AAA sanctioned the 1905 National Motor Car Championship, the first national championship for major auto racing. It resumed the National Championship in 1916, and again from 1920 to 1955. It also sanctioned the Vanderbilt Cup.

The AAA Contest Board dissolved and decided to focus strictly on helping the automobiling public as a result of the 1955 Le Mans disaster.

== History ==
AAA was established in Chicago, Illinois, on March 4, 1902. By June the same year, AAA also established the Racing Board. A. R. Pardington was appointed chairman and the board sanctioned its first race, the 1904 Vanderbilt Cup held on Long Island, New York. It is unclear as to why William K. Vanderbilt had AAA sanction his race as opposed to the Automobile Club of America (ACA), the predominant sanctioning body for U.S. racing at the time.

With the success of the racing board's experience sanctioning automobile events in 1904, the board announced a national track championship for 1905. The National Motor Car Championship was the first time in American auto racing history that a points system was used to officially decide an annual champion. From 1906 through 1915 the racing board, inexplicably, recognized no official championship seasons. It did, however, continue to sanction numerous individual events, the Vanderbilt Cup and events at the Indianapolis Motor Speedway.

In 1908, the ACA created the American Grand Prize, another Grand Prix style race in the United States, along with the then established Vanderbilt Cup. This race started a feud between the ACA and AAA. Later in 1908 it was decided that AAA would sanction all big time racing nationally and the ACA would sanction all international events held on American soil. On December 2, 1908, AAA dissolved the Racing Board and created the Contest Board soon after. Though the rationale for this decision has been lost with time, the move was most likely done to allow AAA to oversee all automobile events and not just racing contests.

The Manufacturers Contest Association (MCA) urged AAA to organize racing so American manufacturers could race mostly stock configuration cars, relevant to the needs of the general public, and ban the pure race cars being imported from Europe. The stock car style rules continued until 1916, when the Contest Board relaxed the rules allowing purpose built machines back into competition ahead of its next officially recognized championship season in 1916. Although AAA did not declare national champions from 1906 through 1915, the American automobile journal Motor Age published who they regarded the most outstanding American driver during the years of 1909–1915. These picks have become de facto national champions of the day.

During the First World War, AAA suspended the national championship and limited the number of sanctioned races as a whole. This period also saw the demise of the Vanderbilt Cup and the American Grand Prize, and the ACA folded during the war. American manufacturers saw the absence of European racers, and the relaxed rules due to no national level sanctioning, as a chance for the U.S. to catch up to the European racers who had dominated racing internationally up until that point. After the War, the Contest Board picked up the pieces and regularly held national championships from 1920 until the U.S. entered the Second World War in 1941.

After World War I, the race car specifications for the national championship were mostly aligned with what the Indianapolis Motor Speedway wanted to run during its Memorial Day classic, and this still holds mostly true today. AAA, again, restarted the championship with the close of the war for the 1946 season and continued uninterrupted through 1955.

On July 13, 1955, Senator Richard Neuberger (D-OR) called for a bill to ban automobile racing after the Le Mans disaster and the 1955 Indianapolis 500 fatalities. The bill did not pass, but pressure from the Senator was enough that the AAA announced on August 3, 1955 it would disband the Contest Board and cease motorsport sanctioning. The Indianapolis Motor Speedway and other Midwestern promoters formed a "Temporary Emergency Committee," later known as the United States Auto Club (USAC), to replace the AAA. At the international level, the Automobile Competition Committee for the United States (ACCUS), formed in 1957 by USAC, the National Association for Stock Car Auto Racing (NASCAR), and the Sports Car Club of America (SCCA), replaced the AAA Contest Board as the national sporting authority representative to the FIA. During the last half of the Racing Boards existence they sanctioned many forms of racing such as midgets, sprint cars, sports cars and stock cars as well as top level championship car racing.

== National Championship results ==
Year	Champion
AAA National Motor Car Championship
1905	(United States) Barney Oldfield
1906	No official national championships
1907	No official national championships
1908	No official national championships
1909	No official national championships
1910	No official national championships
1911	No official national championships
1912	No official national championships
1913	No official national championships
1914	No official national championships
1915	No official national championships
Year	AAA National Championship
1916	(United Kingdom) Dario Resta
1917	No official national championships (World War I/flu pandemic)
1918	No official national championships (World War I/flu pandemic)
1919	No official national championships (World War I/flu pandemic)
1920	(United States) Gaston Chevrolet
1921	(United States) Tommy Milton
1922	(United States) Jimmy Murphy
1923	(United States) Eddie Hearne
1924	(United States) Jimmy Murphy
1925	(United States) Pete DePaolo
1926	(United States) Harry Hartz
1927	(United States) Pete DePaolo
1928	(United States) Louis Meyer
1929	(United States) Louis Meyer
1930	(United States) Billy Arnold
1931	(United States) Louis Schneider
1932	(United States) Bob Carey
1933	(United States) Louis Meyer
1934	(United States) Bill Cummings
1935	(United States) Kelly Petillo
1936	(United States) Mauri Rose
1937	(United States) Wilbur Shaw
1938	(United States) Floyd Roberts
1939	(United States) Wilbur Shaw
1940	(United States) Rex Mays
1941	(United States) Rex Mays
1942	No automobile racing held due to World War II
1943	No automobile racing held due to World War II
1944	No automobile racing held due to World War II
1945	No automobile racing held due to World War II
1946	(United States) Ted Horn
1947	(United States) Ted Horn
1948	(United States) Ted Horn
1949	(United States) Johnnie Parsons
1950	(United States) Henry Banks
1951	(United States) Tony Bettenhausen
1952	(United States) Chuck Stevenson
1953	(United States) Sam Hanks
1954	(United States) Jimmy Bryan
1955	(United States) Bob Sweikert

== Contemporary publication selections ==
Each year from 1909 to 1915 and again from 1917 to 1919, the American automobile journal Motor Age selected a "driver of the year". Likewise, other contemporary publications such as The Horseless Age, MoToR, The New York Times, and Los Angeles Times published similar selections. These were similar in concept to newspaper decisions. While these selections are strictly unofficial, they are customarily regarded as the de facto champions for the respective seasons. No such selections were made for 1916, since an official points system was in place that year to determine the champion.

Year	Motor Age	Horseless Age	Others
1909	Bert Dingley	—	—
1910	Ralph Mulford	—	—
1911	Harvey Herrick	—	—
1912	Ralph DePalma	—	Teddy Tetzlaff (L.A. Times)
1912	Ralph DePalma	—	Bob Burman (NYT)
1912	Ralph DePalma	—	Ralph DePalma (Chicago)
1913	Earl Cooper	Earl Cooper	—
1914	Ralph DePalma	Ralph DePalma (road racing)	Ralph DePalma (MoToR)
1914	Ralph DePalma	René Thomas (speedways)	Ralph DePalma (MoToR)
1915	Earl Cooper (road racing)	Earl Cooper (road racing)	Earl Cooper (MoToR) (road racing)
1915	Gil Andersen (speedways)	Eddie Rickenbacker (speedways)	Dario Resta (MoToR) (speedways)
1915	Eddie Rickenbacker (tracks)	Earl Cooper (overall)	—
1916	—	—	—
1917	Earl Cooper	—	—
1918	Ralph Mulford	—	—
1919	Tommy Milton (road racing)	—	—
1919	Eddie Hearne (speedways)	—	—
1919	Eddie Hearne (overall)	—	—

== Controversy ==
Between the years of 1902 and 1919, although AAA sanctioned many races, an official national championship of drivers was only declared and awarded in 1905 and 1916. On two separate occasions, Contest Board record keepers changed the results of certain seasons, and used extraneous points tables and methods to calculate retrospective national champions for years in which one had not been declared. These ill-advised records made their way into official publications, books, magazines, and media guides, and largely due to the scarcity of records, were accepted as fact for decades by an unsuspecting public. It was not until further research was undertaken during the 1970s and 1980s that the truth behind the history was brought back to light. These actions collectively have made it difficult to distinguish fact from fiction regarding the first two decades of AAA sanctioned national championship racing.

=== Retrospectively awarded champions ===
Sometime during the years 1926 through 1929, Arthur Means, the Assistant Secretary of the AAA Contest Board, with the approval of Secretary Val Haresnape, retrospectively calculated championship results for major AAA-sanctioned races contested in 1909–1915 and 1917–1920. Means used points tables from the mid-1920s to create his hypothetical calculations. By reworking the 1920 docket, adding five events that were originally run as non-points or "exhibition" races, the pair effectively stripped Gaston Chevrolet of his 1920 championship; instead declaring Tommy Milton the new champion. However, by no later than 1929, they restored the 1920 championship back to Chevrolet. Their work, meant to be for "comparative reasons" only, was soon accepted as fact. In addition, various arithmetic inconsistencies created further confusion and glaring anomalies.

In 1951, Russ Catlin a sportswriter and publicist for the AAA Contest Board, made substantial revisions to the recorded history of early AAA racing. Using his own devised system of awarding championship points, and building upon the erroneous work previously generated by Means and Haresnape, Catlin fabricated, distorted, and/or negated AAA Contest Board records for 1902–1920. Catlin first published his list in the 1952 Indianapolis 500 program, and also published what he believed to be a history of AAA racing, intended to celebrate its upcoming 50th anniversary. Catlin retroactively created seven new champions (1902–1908), and revised others. He named Victor Hémery the champion for 1905, the winner of that year's Vanderbilt Cup; it is possible he was unaware that an official 1905 champion (Barney Oldfield) had actually been declared. He also named George Robertson the champion for 1909, differing from Means and Haresnape, who had settled on Bert Dingley. Furthermore, Catlin rerevised the 1920 champion to Tommy Milton once more, even after Means and Haresnape had backtracked that decision and given it back to Gaston Chevrolet. IndyCar currently recognizes Russ Catlin's list from 1909 to 1919, but with Gaston Chevrolet as champion for 1920.

All retrospectively awarded championships named by Means & Haresnape and Catlin are unequivocally considered unofficial by professional historians and statisticians. Furthermore, most consider them revisionist history, and discredit the entire effort made by both parties as illegitimate, unnecessary, fictional, and not consistent with contemporary accounts. The actions of Means, Haresnape, and Catlin made it difficult to distinguish fact from fiction regarding AAA sanctioned national racing, and handbooks and official statistical supplements continue to intermix the revisionist accounts with official and historical record. A gradual increase in the number of trained auto racing historians, aided by digital technology enabling better collaboration and access to historical records, has resulted in progress made towards correcting historical inaccuracies. Bolstered by assistance and advice from professional historians, official IndyCar statisticians during the leadership tenure of Randy Bernard undertook significant corrections to the series' Official Historical Record Book published annually between 2011 and 2013. In more recent years historians have encountered resistance and disinterest on the part of IndyCar Series leadership, and as of 2024, the granite base of the Astor Challenge Cup awarded to American National Champions continues to ignore the 1905 Championship won by Barney Oldfield and unjustly list Tommy Milton instead of Gaston Chevrolet as the 1920 Champion.

Year	Official	Means & Haresnape (1927–29)	Russ Catlin (1951)
1902	—	—	Harry Harkness
1903	—	—	Barney Oldfield
1904	—	—	George Heath
1905	Barney Oldfield	—	Victor Hémery
1906	—	—	Joe Tracy
1907	—	—	Eddie Bald
1908	—	—	Lewis Strang
1909	—	Bert Dingley	George Robertson
1910	—	Ray Harroun	Ray Harroun
1911	—	Ralph Mulford	Ralph Mulford
1912	—	Ralph DePalma	Ralph DePalma
1913	—	Earl Cooper	Earl Cooper
1914	—	Ralph DePalma	Ralph DePalma
1915	—	Earl Cooper	Earl Cooper
1916	Dario Resta	Dario Resta	Dario Resta
1917	—	Earl Cooper	Earl Cooper
1918	—	Ralph Mulford	Ralph Mulford
1919	—	Howdy Wilcox	Howdy Wilcox
1920	Gaston Chevrolet	Tommy Milton; Gaston Chevrolet^{A}	Tommy Milton

^A Harsnape and Means originally awarded the 1920 championship to Milton, but subsequently reverted to Chevrolet.

== See also ==
- American Automobile Association
- American Championship Car Racing
- United States Auto Club
- Sports Car Club of America
- Automobile Racing Club of America
