= Billy Carlson =

American racing driver (1889–1915)

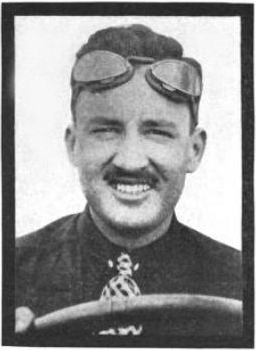
- Carlson, circa 1915
- Born: William Henry Carlson; October 17, 1889 San Diego, California, U.S.
- Died: July 5, 1915 (aged 25) Tacoma, Washington, U.S.

Champ Car career
- 18 races run over 3 years
- First race: 1913 San Diego Race (San Diego)
- Last race: 1915 Montamarathon Trophy (Tacoma)
- First win: 1913 Point Loma Race (San Diego)
Wins	Podiums	Poles
1	6	0

William Henry Carlson (October 17, 1889 – July 5, 1915) was an American racing driver. He was killed in an AAA National Championship race at Tacoma Speedway.

== Biography ==
Carlson began his career competing in races on the Pacific coast and was a comparative unknown before he started in the 500-mile classic at Indianapolis in 1914. He took ninth in the event and "immediately attained prominence on the gasoline circuit."

Carlson was a member of the Maxwell team for two years in 1914 and 1915 after he was "discovered" by Ray Harroun, a Maxwell engineer. His most notable achievement after joining Maxwell was his world's non-stop record of 305 miles made at San Diego, California, in January 1915. He came in second to Barney Oldfield at Venice, California.

Carlson sustained fatal injuries in the Montamarathon race at Tacoma Speedway on July 4, 1915, dying the following day. Maxwell suspended their racing program for the remainder of the season; the team was disbanded and the automobiles were shipped back to the factory in Detroit.

== Motorsports career results ==
=== Indianapolis 500 results ===
Year	Car	Start	Qual	Rank	Finish	Laps	Led	Retired
1914	25	5	93.360	6	9	200	0	Running
1915	19	16	84.110	16	9	200	0	Running
Totals						400	0	

Starts	2
Poles	0
Front Row	0
Wins	0
Top 5	0
Top 10	2
Retired	0
