= Tom Orr =

American racing driver (1877–1954)

- Born: Thomas Samuel Orr; August 27, 1877 Chicago, Illinois, U.S.
- Died: December 11, 1954 (aged 77) Denver, Colorado, U.S.

Champ Car career
- 5 races run over 2 years
- First race: 1914 Elgin National Trophy (Elgin)
- Last race: 1915 Omaha 300 (Omaha)
Wins	Podiums	Poles
0	1	0

Thomas Samuel Orr (August 27, 1877 – December 11, 1954) was an American racing driver from Chicago, Illinois. He competed in the AAA Championship Car series in 1914 and 1915 making five starts including the 1915 Indianapolis 500. All of his race starts were behind the wheel of a Maxwell, for whom he was an engineer. He served in World War I and later moved to Denver, Colorado where he died in 1954.

== Motorsports career results ==
=== Indianapolis 500 results ===
Year	Car	Start	Qual	Rank	Finish	Laps	Led	Retired
1915	21	17	83.550	17	13	168	0	Axle bearing
Totals						168	0	

Starts	1
Poles	0
Front Row	0
Wins	0
Top 5	0
Top 10	0
Retired	1
