= A. R. Pardington =

American auto racing official (1862–1915)

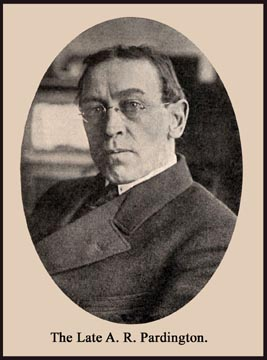
- Born: Arthur Rayner Pardington; July 30, 1862; Saginaw, Michigan, U.S.
- Died: July 28, 1915 (aged 52); Detroit, Michigan, U.S.
- Spouses: Gertrude Dora Hause (m. 1887); Lucile Fatima Crosley (m. 1889 )
- Children: Dorothy Gertrude Pardington; Janet Lucille Pardington; Ruth Crosley Pardington
- Parents: Rayner Stevens Pardington; Eliza(beth) Jane Cory
- Relatives: Rev. George Palmer Pardington (brother)

Signature
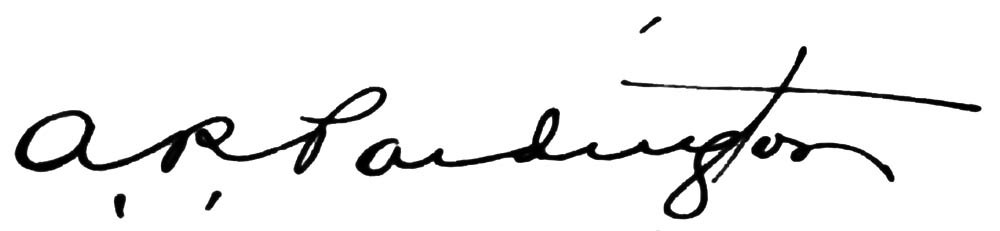

Arthur Rayner Pardington (July 30, 1862 – July 28, 1915) was the first chairman of the American Automobile Association's Contest Board. He was the chief engineer and second Vice President of the Long Island Motor Parkway, Inc., which oversaw the building and development of the parkway. He was also the vice president and general manager of the Lincoln Highway Association.

== Early life and family ==
Pardington was born on July 30, 1862, in Saginaw, Michigan, to the Rev. Dr. Rayner Stevens Pardington (1836–1906) and Elizabeth Jane Cory Pardington (1840–1916). Later in life, he lived on Long Island and was a resident of Smithtown, New York. On November 10, 1887, in Tecumseh, Michigan, he married Gertrude Dora Hause (1864–1894), with whom he had a daughter Dorothy Gertrude Pardington. Widowed, he then married Lucile Fatima Crosley (1866–1943) on March 15, 1889, in Franklin, Ohio. He had two children from the second marriage, Janet Lucille Pardington (1899–1991) and Ruth Crosley Pardington (1900–1983). His brother was the Rev. Dr. George Palmer Pardington of the Nyack Institute.

== Auto racing official ==
In 1904 the American Automobile Association appointed Pardington, an avid auto racing enthusiast, as the first chairman of their newly-created Racing Board. His most important project was overseeing the Vanderbilt Cup races. Early Vanderbilt cups were held on local roads, making track security difficult for AAA officials. Deaths that occurred from over-eager spectators encroaching on the roadways threatened the future of auto racing altogether. Pardington promoted limited access projects, such as the Long Island Motor Parkway, as being a safer alternative. In 1911, he served as the referee for the inaugural Indianapolis 500.

== The Long Island Motor Parkway ==
Pardington was instrumental in promoting William Kissam Vanderbilt II's Long Island Motor Parkway and, on June 6, 1908, hosted an official ceremony for the commencement of the parkway's construction. In his speech at the ceremony, he said:

Think of the time it will save the busy man of affairs, who likes to crowd into each day a bit of relaxation. He will leave downtown at three o'clock in the afternoon, take the subway to a garage within striking distance of the new Blackwell's Island-East River Bridge. In twenty minutes a 60-horse-power car will have him at the western terminus of the motor parkway. Here a card of admission passes him through the gates, speed limits are left behind, the great white way is before him, and with throttle open he can go, go, go and keep going fifty, sixty or ninety miles an hour until Riverhead or Southampton is reached.

While Pardington argued the parkway would increase the Vanderbilt fortune, the family ultimately failed to make any money through the venture, eventually giving up the roadway to the government in lieu of unpaid taxes.

He was also responsible for the first Vanderbilt Cup race on Long Island and for William K. Vanderbilt II's donation of the competition's trophy. Besides Vanderbilt, he also acted as a referee of the race.

== Lincoln Highway ==
Based on his success with realizing the Long Island Motor Parkway, Pardington was invited to work on the Lincoln Highway and served as its vice president and general manager. He died while working on this project.

== Death ==
Pardington died in Detroit on July 28, 1915. He was 52 years old. He is interred in the Woodlawn Cemetery in Detroit.
