= George C. Babcock =

American racing driver (1876–1921)

- Born: George Carlos Babcock; June 21, 1876 Hartford, Connecticut, U.S.
- Died: October 28, 1921 (aged 45) Hartford, Connecticut, U.S.

Champ Car career
- 4 races run over 2 years
- First race: 1914 Corona Race (Corona)
- Last race: 1915 Chicago 500 (Speedway Park)
Wins	Podiums	Poles
0	0	0

George Carlos Babcock (June 21, 1876 – October 28, 1921) was an American racing driver. He was also involved in the early days of aviation as a test pilot, as well as spending time as a test driver.

== Biography ==
Babcock was born on 21 June 1876 in Hartford, Connecticut. He participated in the 1915 Indianapolis 500. He died after a short illness in St. Francis' Hospital in Hartford, Connecticut on 28 October 1921.

== Motorsports career results ==
=== Indianapolis 500 results ===
Year	Car	Start	Qual	Rank	Finish	Laps	Led	Retired
1915	12	12	89.460	10	17	117	0	Broken Cylinder
Totals						117	0	

Starts	1
Poles	0
Front Row	0
Wins	0
Top 5	0
Top 10	0
Retired	1
