= 1915 Indianapolis 500 =

American motor race

5th Indianapolis 500
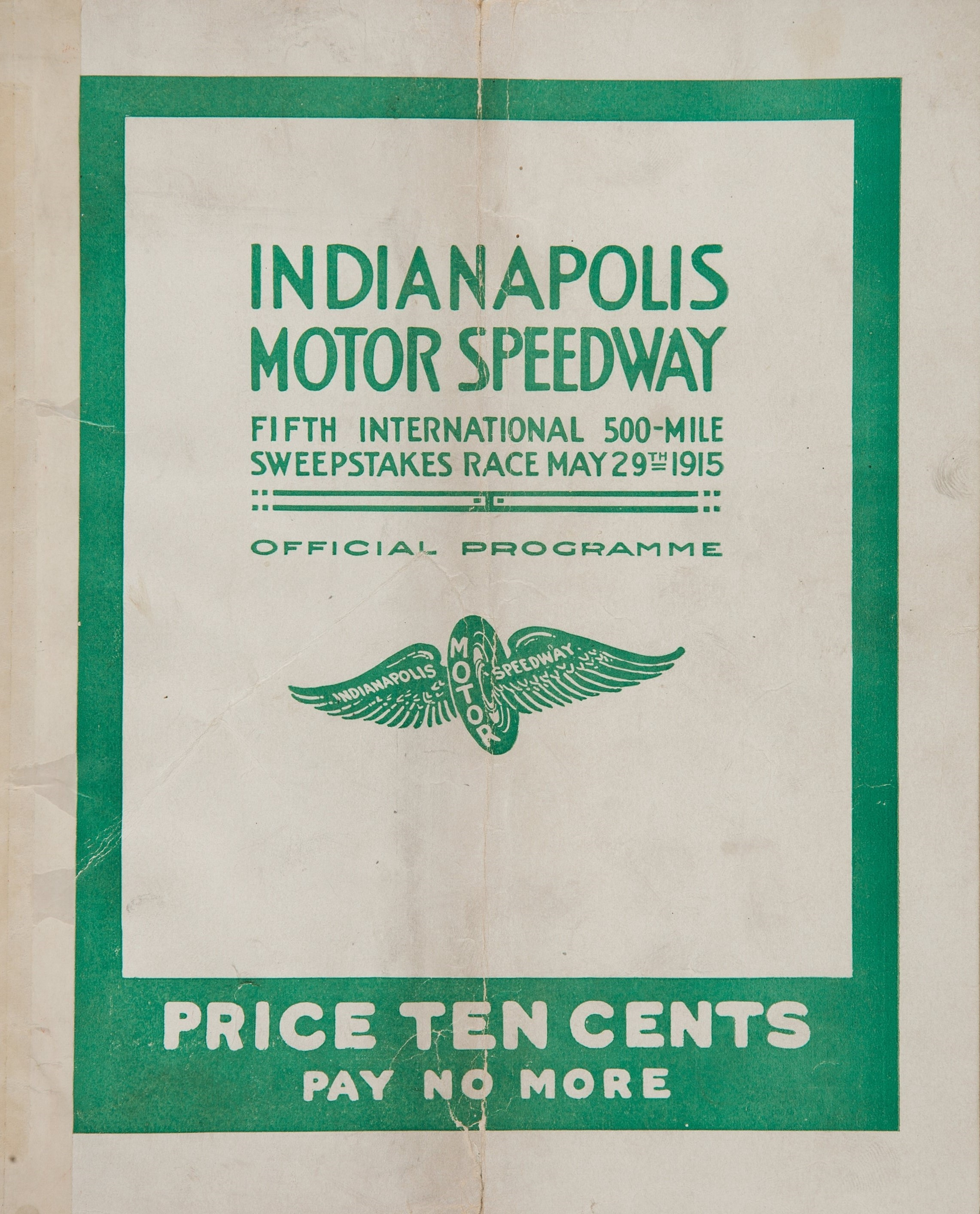

Indianapolis Motor Speedway

Indianapolis 500
- Sanctioning body: AAA
- Date: May 31, 1915
- Winner: Ralph DePalma
- Winning Riding Mechanic: Louis Fontaine
- Winning Entrant: E. C. Patterson
- Winning time: 5:33:55.51
- Average speed: 89.840 mph (144.583 km/h)
- Pole position: Howdy Wilcox
- Pole speed: 98.90 mph (159.16 km/h)
- Most laps led: Ralph DePalma (132)

Pre-race
- Pace car: Packard 6 (Model 5-48)
- Pace car driver: Carl G. Fisher
- Starter: Thomas J. Hay
- Honorary referee: A. R. Pardington
- Estimated attendance: 60,000

Chronology
Previous	Next
1914	1916

The 5th International 500-Mile Sweepstakes Race was held at the Indianapolis Motor Speedway on Monday, May 31, 1915. The traditional race date of May 30 fell on a Sunday, but race organizers declined to schedule the race for Sunday. The race was set for Saturday May 29, but heavy rains in the days leading up to the race flooded the grounds and made some roads leading to the track impassible. Officials decided to postpone the race until Monday May 31 in order to allow the grounds to dry out. Speedway management would maintain their policy to not race on Sundays until 1974.

After a loss in 1912, Ralph DePalma succeeded in victory for 1915. DePalma was accompanied by riding mechanic Louis Fountaine.

== Starting grid ==
Row	Inside		Inside Center		Outside Center		Outside	
1	1	(United States) Howdy Wilcox	2	(United States) Ralph DePalma	3	(United Kingdom) Dario Resta R	4	(United States) Earl Cooper
2	5	(United States) Gil Andersen	6	(France) Jean Porporato R	8	(United States) Bob Burman	9	(United States) Art Klein
3	10	(United States) Tom Alley R	14	(United States) Harry Grant	15	(United States) Eddie O'Donnell R	12	(United States) George C. Babcock R
4	17	(United States) John DePalma R	7	(United Kingdom) Noel van Raalte R	18	(United States) Joe Cooper R	19	(United States) Billy Carlson
5	21	(United States) Tom Orr R	22	(United States) Ralph Mulford	24	(Germany) John A. Mais R	23	(United States) Eddie Rickenbacker
6	25	(United States) C. C. Cox R	26	(United States) George Hill R	27	(United States) Louis Chevrolet R	28	(United States) Willie Haupt

R Indianapolis 500 rookie

== Box score ==
Finish	Start	No	Name	Entrant	Chassis	Engine	Qual	Rank	Laps	Status
1	2	2	(United States) Ralph DePalma	E. C. Patterson	Mercedes	Mercedes	98.580	2	200	89.84 mph
2	3	3	(United Kingdom) Dario Resta R	Peugeot Auto Import Company	Peugeot	Peugeot	98.470	3	200	+3:29.43
3	5	5	(United States) Gil Andersen (Johnny Aitken)	Stutz Motor Car Company	Stutz	Stutz	95.140	5	200	+8:32.07
4	4	4	(United States) Earl Cooper (Johnny Aitken)	Stutz Motor Car Company	Stutz	Stutz	96.770	4	200	+12:23.85
5	11	15	(United States) Eddie O'Donnell R	Duesenberg Brothers	Duesenberg	Duesenberg	88.93	11	200	+34:17.76
6	7	8	(United States) Bob Burman	Bob Burman	Peugeot	Peugeot	92.400	7	200	+39:24.10
7	1	1	(United States) Howdy Wilcox	Stutz Motor Car Company	Stutz	Stutz	98.900	1	200	+40:24.22
8	9	10	(United States) Tom Alley R	Duesenberg Brothers	Duesenberg	Duesenberg	90.000	9	200	+41:12.50
9	16	19	(United States) Billy Carlson (Hughie Hughes)	United States Motor Company	Maxwell	Maxwell	84.110	16	200	+46:00.39
10	14	7	(United Kingdom) Noel van Raalte R	Sunbeam Motor Car Company	Sunbeam	Sunbeam	86.870	14	200	+1:01:06.19
11	24	28	(United States) Willie Haupt	R. E. Donaldson	Emden	Emden	80.360	24	200	+1:30:06.19
12	10	14	(United States) Harry Grant	Fortuna Racing Team, Inc.	Sunbeam	Sunbeam	89.29	10	184	Loose mud apron
13	17	21	(United States) Tom Orr R (Billy Carlson)	United States Motor Company	Maxwell	Maxwell	83.550	17	168	Axle bearing
14	6	6	(France) Jean Porporato R	Sunbeam Motor Car Company	Sunbeam	Sunbeam	94.740	6	164	Piston
15	15	18	(United States) Joe Cooper R	E. E. Miles & J. W. Gwin	Duesenberg	Duesenberg	85.550	15	154	Crash SC
16	18	22	(United States) Ralph Mulford (Billy Chandler)	Duesenberg Brothers	Duesenberg	Duesenberg	82.720	18	124	Rod
17	12	12	(United States) George C. Babcock R	Peugeot Auto Import Company	Peugeot	Peugeot	89.46	12	117	Cylinder
18	8	9	(United States) Art Klein (Billy Chandler)	Art Klein	Duesenberg	Duesenberg	90.450	8	111	Smoking
19	20	23	(United States) Eddie Rickenbacker	United States Motor Company	Maxwell	Maxwell	81.970	20	103	Rod
20	23	27	(United States) Louis Chevrolet R	Louis Chevrolet	Cornelian	Sterling	81.010	23	76	Valve
21	13	17	(United States) John DePalma R	James E. Watson	Delage	Delage	87.040	13	41	Loose flywheel
22	19	24	(Germany) John A. Mais R	John A. Mais	Mais	Mercer	81.970	19	23	Left course
23	22	26	(United States) George Hill R	C. W. Fuller	Bugatti	Bugatti	81.520	22	20	Water pump gear
24	21	25	(United States) C. C. Cox R	Edward D. McNay	Cino	Mercer	81.520	21	12	Timing gears

Note: Relief drivers in parentheses

W Former Indianapolis 500 winner

R Indianapolis 500 Rookie

=== Race statistics ===
Lap Leaders
Laps	Leader
1	Dario Resta
2–6	Howdy Wilcox
7–32	Gil Andersen
33–61	Dario Resta
62–127	Ralph DePalma
128–134	Dario Resta
135–200	Ralph DePalma

Total laps led
Laps	Leader
Ralph DePalma	132
Dario Resta	37
Gil Andersen	26
Howdy Wilcox	5

== Race details ==
- For 1915, riding mechanics were required.
- When about 2,000 unsuspecting fans showed up on May 29 for the race (which had already been rescheduled to May 31), Ralph DePalma entertained the fans with a tire changing exhibition.

== Gallery ==
1915 winning car

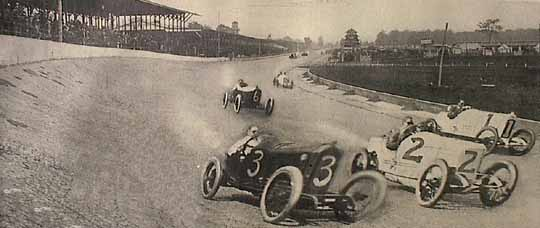
Composite image showing the front row at the start of the 1915 Indianapolis 500

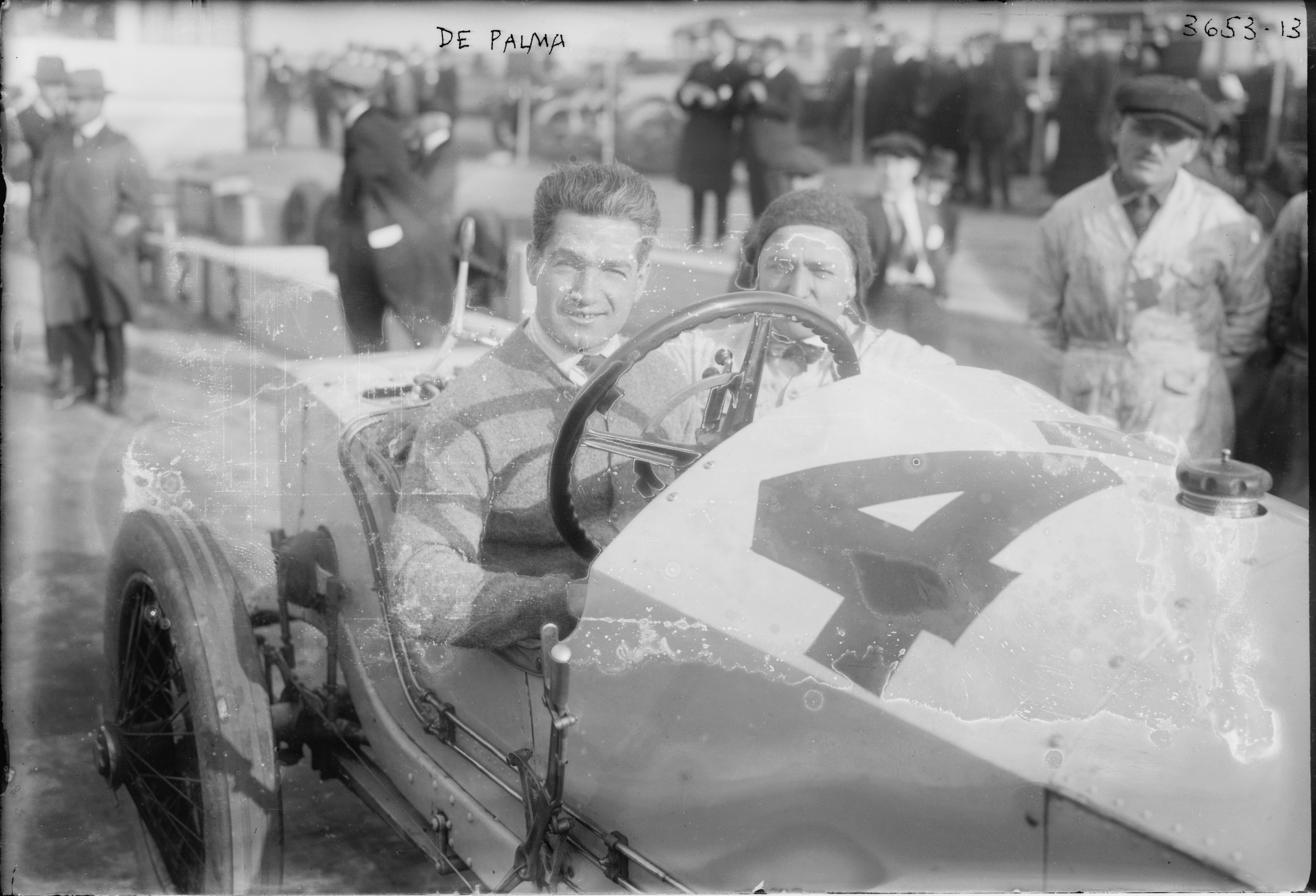
Ralph DePalma at the 1915 Indianapolis 500

1914 Indianapolis 500; Rene Thomas	1915 Indianapolis 500; Ralph DePalma	1916 Indianapolis 500; Dario Resta
Preceded by 82.474 mph (1914 Indianapolis 500)	Record for the fastest average speed 89.840 mph	Succeeded by 94.484 mph (1922 Indianapolis 500)
