= Tom Alley =

American racing driver (1889–1953)

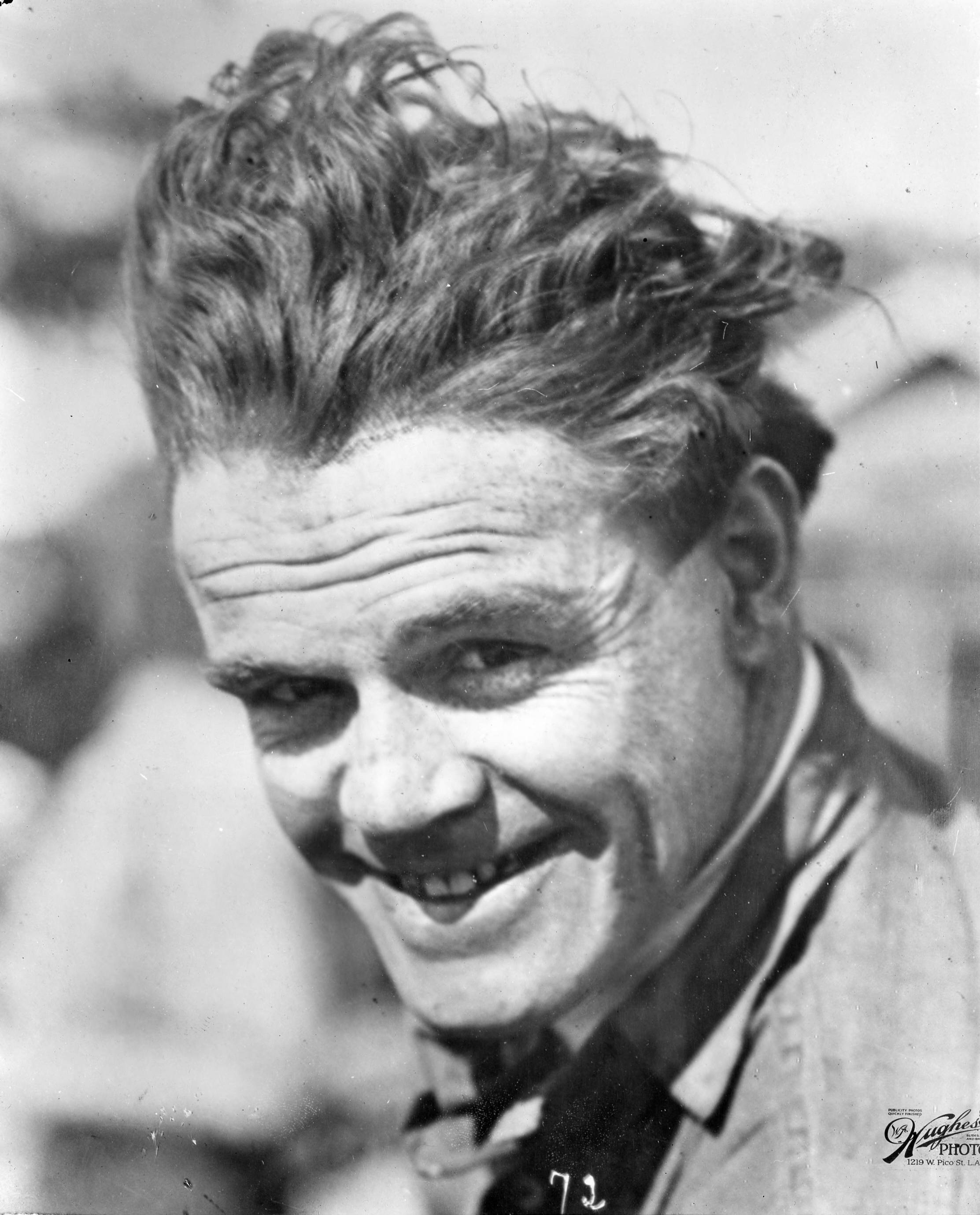
- Alley in 1926
- Born: Thomas Wilkenson Alley; May 21, 1889 Metamora, Indiana, U.S.
- Died: March 26, 1953 (aged 63) Indianapolis, Indiana, U.S.

Champ Car career
- 45 races run over 9 years
- Best finish: 14th (tie) (1921)
- First race: 1914 Sioux City 300 (Sioux City)
- Last race: 1922 Indianapolis 500 (Indianapolis)
- First win: 1914 St. Paul 100 (St. Paul)
- Last win: 1917 20-mile Sprint (Speedway Park)
Wins	Podiums	Poles
2	12	0

Thomas Wilkenson Alley (May 21, 1889 – March 26, 1953) was an American racing driver. Alley was also a riding mechanic, most notably during the 1914 Vanderbilt Cup with Ralph DePalma.

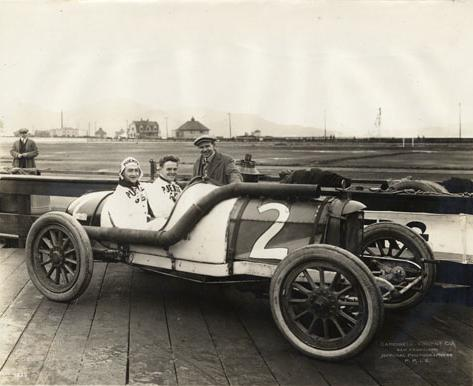
Alley at the wheel of his Duesenberg before the 1915 American Grand Prize at San Francisco

== Motorsports career results ==
=== Indianapolis 500 results ===
Year	Car	Start	Qual	Rank	Finish	Laps	Led	Retired
1915	10	9	90.000	9	8	200	0	Running
1916	12	19	82.040	21	11	120	0	Running
1919	26	28	92.200	27	5	200	0	Running
1921	27	18	80.500	23	11	133	0	Rod
1922	26	12	94.050	16	9	200	0	Running
Totals						853	0	

Starts	5
Poles	0
Front Row	0
Wins	0
Top 5	1
Top 10	3
Retired	1
