= Eddie O'Donnell =

American racing driver (1887–1920)

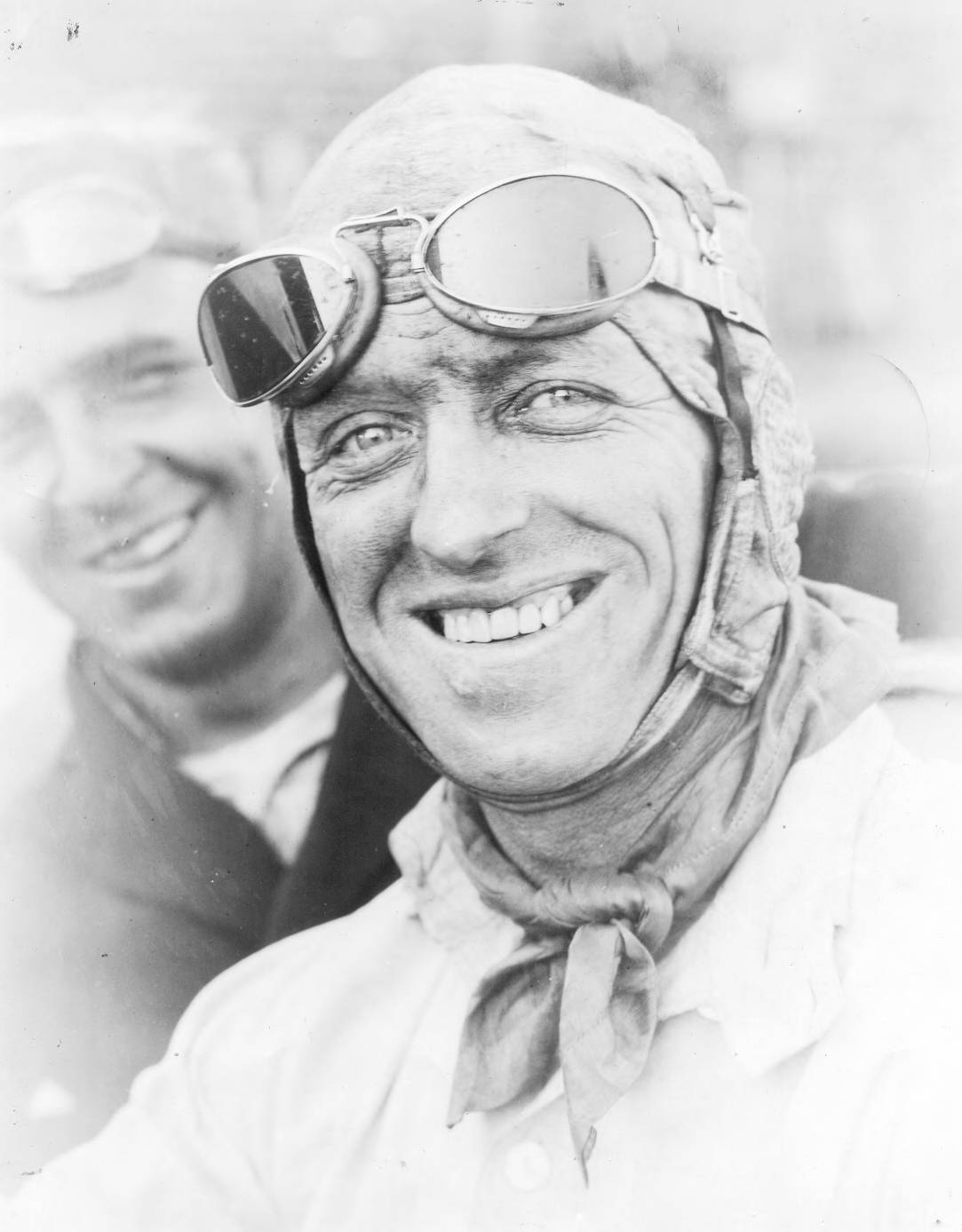
- O'Donnell at Tacoma Speedway in 1920
- Born: Edward Francis O'Donnell; April 30, 1887 Whitewater, Wisconsin, U.S.
- Died: November 26, 1920 (aged 33) Los Angeles, California, U.S.

Champ Car career
- 36 races run over 5 years
- Best finish: 12th (1920)
- First race: 1914 Kalamazoo 100 (Kalamazoo)
- Last race: 1920 Beverly Hills 250 #2 (Beverly Hills)
- First win: 1915 Tropico Road Race (Tropico)
- Last win: 1915 Galesburg 100 (Galesburg)
Wins	Podiums	Poles
3	14	0

Edward Francis O'Donnell (April 30, 1887 – November 26, 1920) was an American racing driver. He gained fame competing for the Duesenberg team.

== Racing career ==
O'Donnell started his career as a riding mechanic for Duesenberg racing driver Eddie Rickenbacker. When Rickenbacker left the Duesenberg team to join the Peugeot team, O'Donnell took over as driver. He served as Captain of the Duesenberg team and was highly successful on the dirt tracks and board tracks around the United States, also having raced on the road circuits. He recorded three victories during the 1915 season. In 1916, he recorded two non-Championship victories, during only the second points championship season conducted in American history.

== Death ==
O'Donnell was fatally injured when he and Gaston Chevrolet collided during the Beverly Hills Speedway Classic race on Thanksgiving Day 1920. Chevrolet was killed as well as O'Donnell's mechanic Lyall Jolls. O'Donnell died the next morning.

== Motorsports career results ==
=== Indianapolis 500 results ===
Year	Car	Start	Qual	Rank	Finish	Laps	Led	Retired
1915	15	11	88.930	12	5	200	0	Running
1919	10	5	97.300	13	22	60	0	Piston
1920	29	12	88.200	14	14	149	0	Oil line
Totals						409	0	

Starts	3
Poles	0
Front Row	0
Wins	0
Top 5	1
Top 10	1
Retired	2
