= Billy Chandler =

American racing driver (1876–1924)

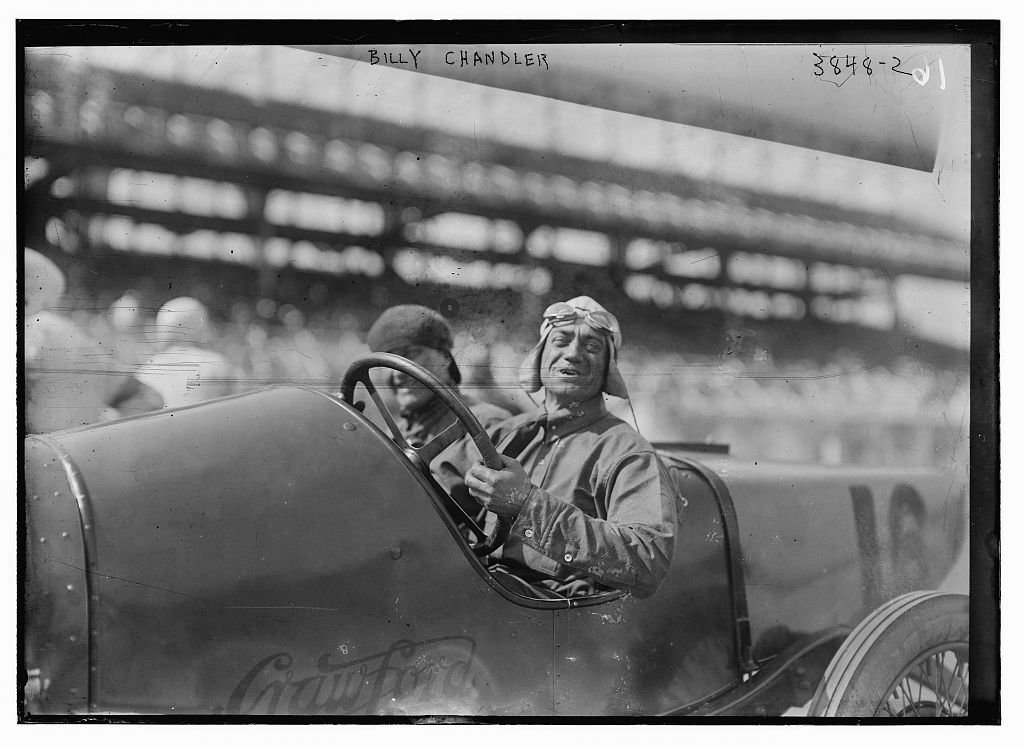
- Chandler in 1916
- Born: William Henry Chandler; November 6, 1876 New York, New York, U.S.
- Died: July 18, 1924 (aged 47) New Brunswick, New Jersey, U.S.

Champ Car career
- 24 races run over 5 years
- Best finish: 31st (1916)
- First race: 1912 Pabst Blue Ribbon Trophy (Wauwatosa)
- Last race: 1916 International Sweepstakes (Sharonville)
Wins	Podiums	Poles
0	6	0

William Henry Chandler (November 6, 1876 – July 18, 1924) was an American racing driver.

Chandler served in various roles after his racing career, moving to New Brunswick, New Jersey in 1923 to pursue careers in real estate and as a justice of the peace. Chandler died at his office in New Brunswick on July 18, 1924 of a heart attack, at the age of 47.

== Motorsports career results ==
=== Indianapolis 500 results ===
Year	Car	Start	Qual	Rank	Finish	Laps	Led	Retired
1914	38	4	87.540	23	21	69	0	Rod
1916	24	15	84.840	17	9	120	0	Running
Totals						189	0	

Starts	2
Poles	0
Front Row	0
Wins	0
Top 5	0
Top 10	1
Retired	1
