= Dario Resta =

British racing driver (1882–1924)

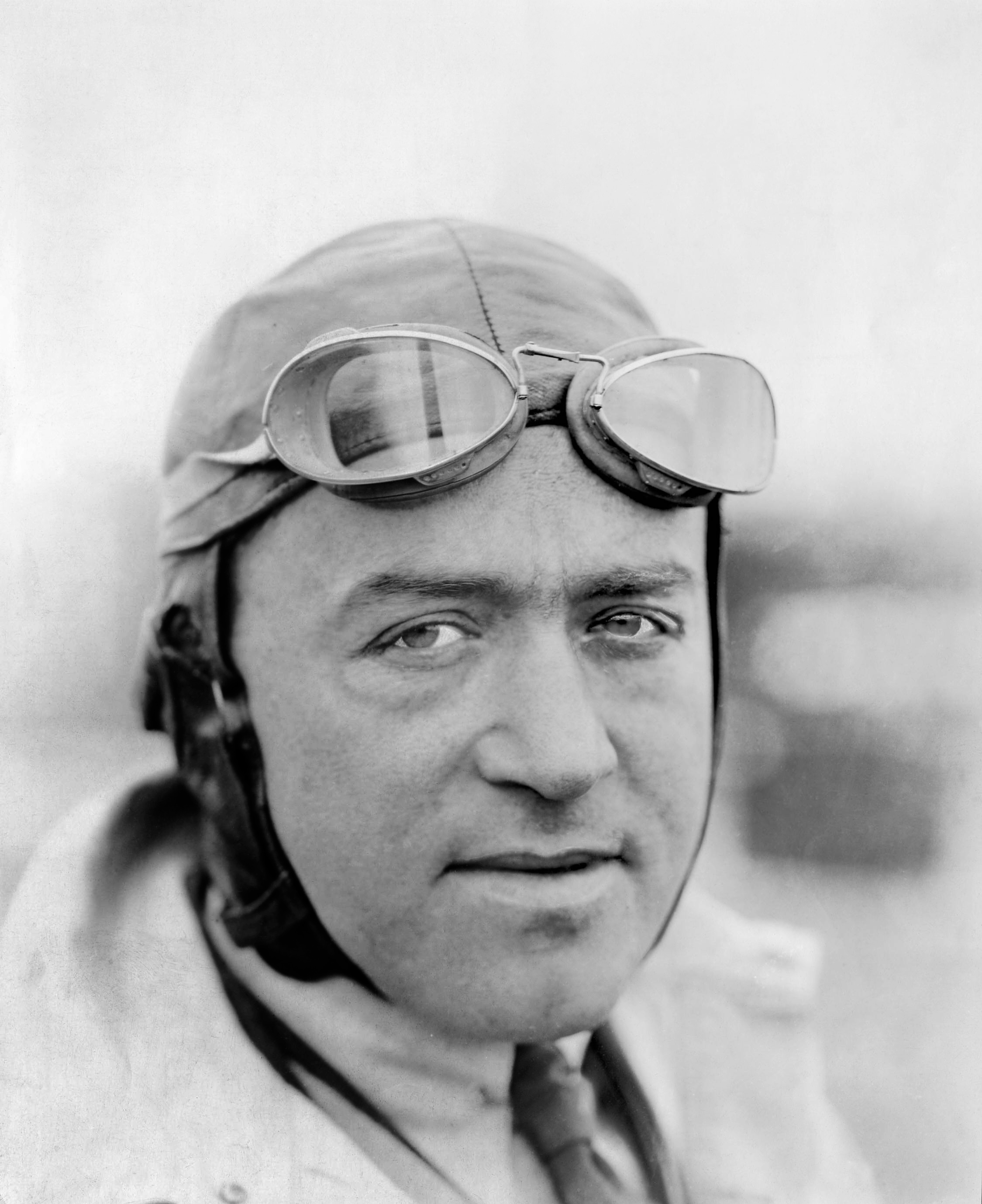
- Resta at Tacoma Speedway in 1919
- Born: Dario Raoul Resta; 17 August 1882 Faenza, Emilia-Romagna, Italy
- Died: 3 September 1924 (aged 42) Weybridge, Surrey, England

Championship titles
- AAA Championship Car (1916); Major victories Vanderbilt Cup (1915, 1916); Indianapolis 500 (1916)

Champ Car career
- 34 races run over 6 years
- Best finish: 1st (1916)
- First race: 1915 American Grand Prize (Panama–Pacific)
- Last race: 1923 Indianapolis 500 (Indianapolis)
- First win: 1915 American Grand Prize (Panama–Pacific)
- Last win: 1916 Vanderbilt Cup (Santa Monica)
Wins	Podiums	Poles
10	18	2

Dario Raoul Resta (17 August 1882 – 3 September 1924), was a British racing driver. He is best remembered for his successes racing Championship cars in the United States. The 1916 American National Champion, Resta was the winner of the 1916 Indianapolis 500, as well as the Vanderbilt Cup in 1915 and 1916.

== Early years ==
Resta was born in Faenza, Italy. His family moved him to England at the age of two. He began racing there in 1907 when he took part in the Montagu Cup, the very first race staged at the new Brooklands race track. He set a record of 95.7 mph (154.0 km/h) in a half-mile run a few years later. On October 2, 1913, alternating with Jean Chassagne and Kenelm Lee Guinness in two-hour spells, Resta set up a series of long distance World Records with a Sunbeam Grand Prix car fitted with a single-seater body. After competing in Grand Prix motor racing in Europe, including the 1913 French Grand Prix, he went to the U.S.

== Coming to America ==
In early 1915, Resta was brought to the United States by Alphonse Kaufman, an America importer of Peugeots, to drive Kaufman's Peugeot EX3. In January he married Mary Wishart, the sister of racer Spencer Wishart who had died the previous year. In February he won the United States Grand Prix, more properly named the United States Grand Prize, at San Francisco followed by a victory in the Vanderbilt Cup. After leading during the final stages of that year's Indianapolis 500, he finished second to Ralph DePalma when his car skidded and he had to make a pit-stop for tyres. Resta then drove his blue Peugeot to victory in the inaugural 500-mile (800 km) race on the board track at the Chicago Speedway on 26 June 1915. The race received eighteen pages of coverage in the 1 July 1915, issue of Motor Age magazine.

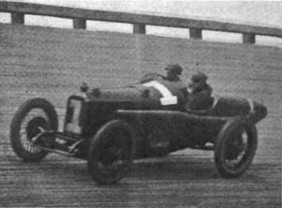
Resta's 1915 win in Chicago

The following year, in 1916, en route to winning the United States National Driving Championship, Resta repeated as the winner of the Vanderbilt Cup plus he won the 1916 Indianapolis 500, the Chicago 300, the Minneapolis 150 and the Omaha 150 races.

With World War I raging in Europe and the United States entering the war in 1918, races were reduced to a minimum. During 1918, Resta drove a Peugeot at a race in Sheepshead Bay, Brooklyn, a minor event with only a handful of competitors.

== Comeback years ==
In 1923, Resta returned to racing at the age of 41, making his first appearance in Beverly Hills, California. Next, he made another attempt at Indianapolis but was forced out of the race after 225 miles (362 km). Racing again in Europe, Resta finished 3rd in the Penya Rhin Grand Prix and won the voiturette class at the Spanish Grand Prix. He drove for Sunbeam in the 1924 season with teammates Henry Segrave and Kenelm Lee Guinness.

== Death ==
Resta was killed in England on 3 September 1924 at the age of 42 when his car crashed at Brooklands while trying for a new land speed record. Resta was driving a Sunbeam when a belt on his car broke on the second lap and punctured his tyre sending him out of control. The car crashed through a corrugated iron fence on the Railway Straight and caught fire.

This accident also hospitalized his riding-mechanic, Bill Perkins, causing him to miss the San Sebastian Grand Prix a few weeks later. Perkins was Sunbeam driver Kenelm Lee Guinness's regular mechanic and so was substituted by Tom Barrett. Guinness suffered a serious crash during this race, in which Barrett was killed and this accident led to the end of the practice of carrying riding-mechanics during races.

== Awards and honors ==
Resta has been inducted into the following halls of fame:

- Auto Racing Hall of Fame (1954)

== Motorsports career results ==
=== Indianapolis 500 results ===
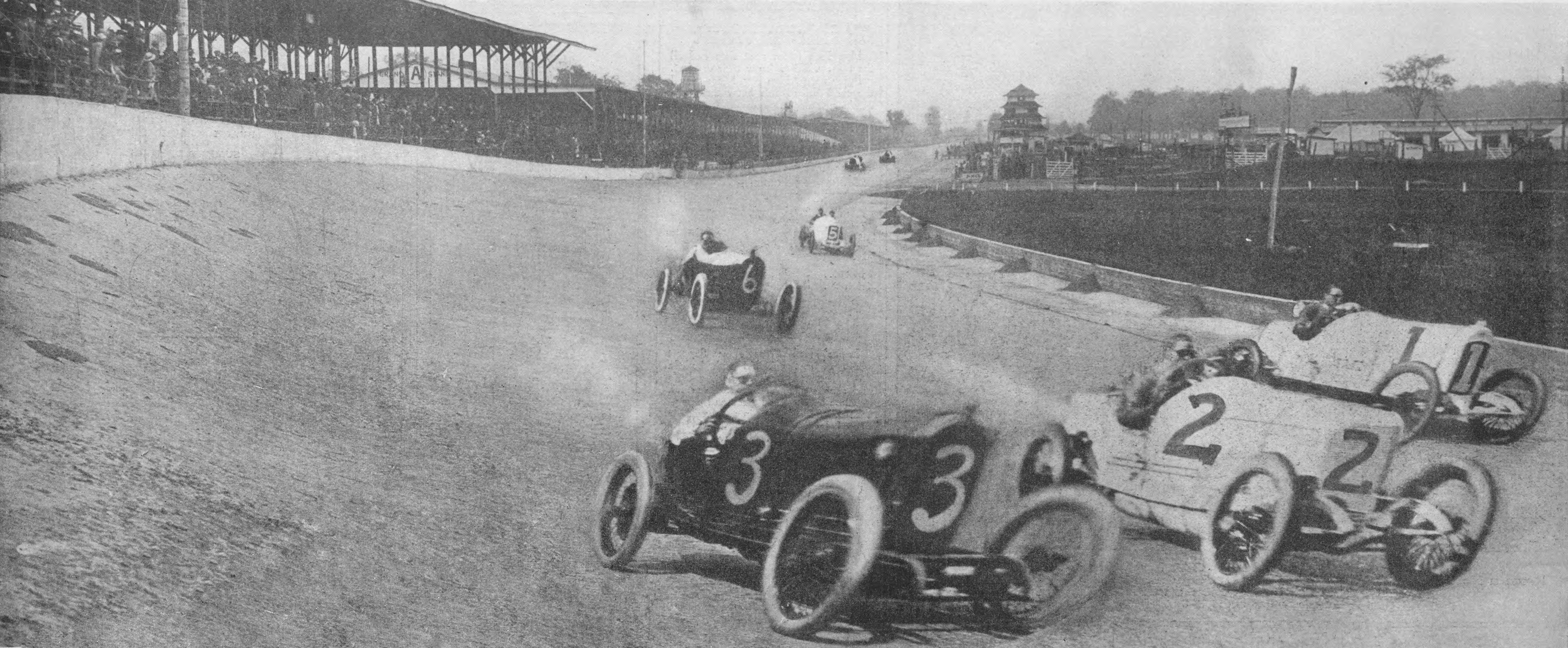
Resta (car #3) in the 1915 Indianapolis 500

Year	Car	Start	Qual	Rank	Finish	Laps	Led	Retired
1915	3	3	98.470	3	2	200	37	Running
1916	17	4	94.400	4	1	120	103	Running
1923	4	3	98.020	8	14	88	0	Differential
Totals						408	140	

Starts	3
Poles	0
Front Row	2
Wins	1
Top 5	2
Top 10	2
Retired	1

Preceded by Ralph DePalma	Indianapolis 500 Winner; 1916	Succeeded by Howdy Wilcox
