= Ralph DePalma =

American racing driver (1882–1956)

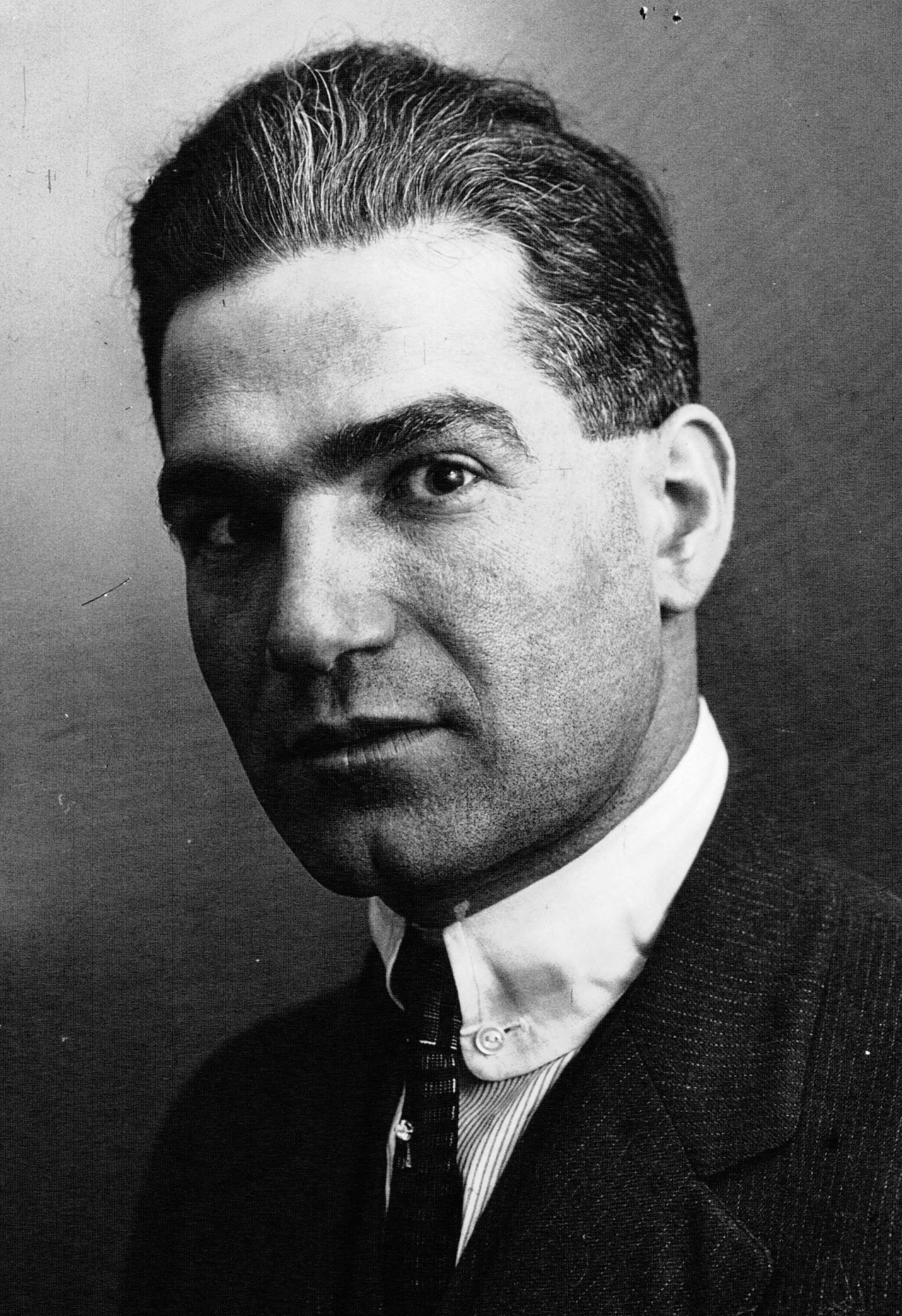
- DePalma in 1912
- Born: Raffaele De Palma; December 19, 1882 Biccari, Apulia, Italy
- Died: March 31, 1956 (aged 73) South Pasadena, California, U.S.

Championship titles
- Major victories Vanderbilt Cup (1912, 1914); Indianapolis 500 (1915)

Champ Car career
- 100 races run over 23 years
- Best finish: 4th (1916, 1920)
- First race: 1909 Wheeler-Schebler Trophy (Indianapolis)
- Last race: 1933 Syracuse 100 (Syracuse)
- First win: 1909 Long Island Stock Car Derby, Class A (Riverhead)
- Last win: 1921 25-mile Heat #1 (Beverly Hills)
Wins	Podiums	Poles
25	37	9

Raffaele "Ralph" DePalma (occasionally spelt De Palma, December 19, 1882 – March 31, 1956) was an American racing driver who won the 1915 Indianapolis 500. DePalma won the 1908, 1909, 1910, and 1911 American AAA national dirt track championships and is credited with winning 25 American Championship car races. He won the Canadian national championship in 1929. DePalma estimated that he had earned $1.5 million by 1934 after racing for 27 years. He is inducted in numerous halls of fame. He competed on boards and dirt road courses and ovals.

== Biography ==
Born in Biccari, Apulia, Italy, DePalma's family, who was from nearby Troia, emigrated to the United States in 1891. When he arrived in the US he was told that, because his father had become a naturalized US citizen, he was automatically a US citizen himself. It was not until March 1920 that it was revealed to him that his father had not completed the paperwork required. He applied for US citizenship and was granted it in August 1920. As a young man, he tried bicycle racing with mixed success, but at the age of twenty-two, he began racing motorcycles before switching to the automobile dirt track racing circuit in 1909, the year that the American Automobile Association established the national driving championship.

DePalma and his riding mechanic pushing their 1910 Mercedes 90 hp that led for 196 laps at the 1912 Indianapolis 500

DePalma was immediately successful in car racing. In 1911, DePalma won the first Milwaukee Mile Championship Car race. However, he is still remembered for the dramatic manner in which he lost the 1912 Indianapolis 500. After taking over the race lead on lap 3 and then leading the race for the next 196 laps, his car, a 1910 Mercedes 90 hp with overhead valves, cracked a piston. With only two laps remaining, he and his mechanic had to push the car across the finish line to take eleventh place. At that time, only cars completing the full 200 laps received any prize money and pushing the Mercedes over the line only completed the 199th lap. This Mercedes remains on display at the Indianapolis Motor Speedway Hall of Fame Museum.

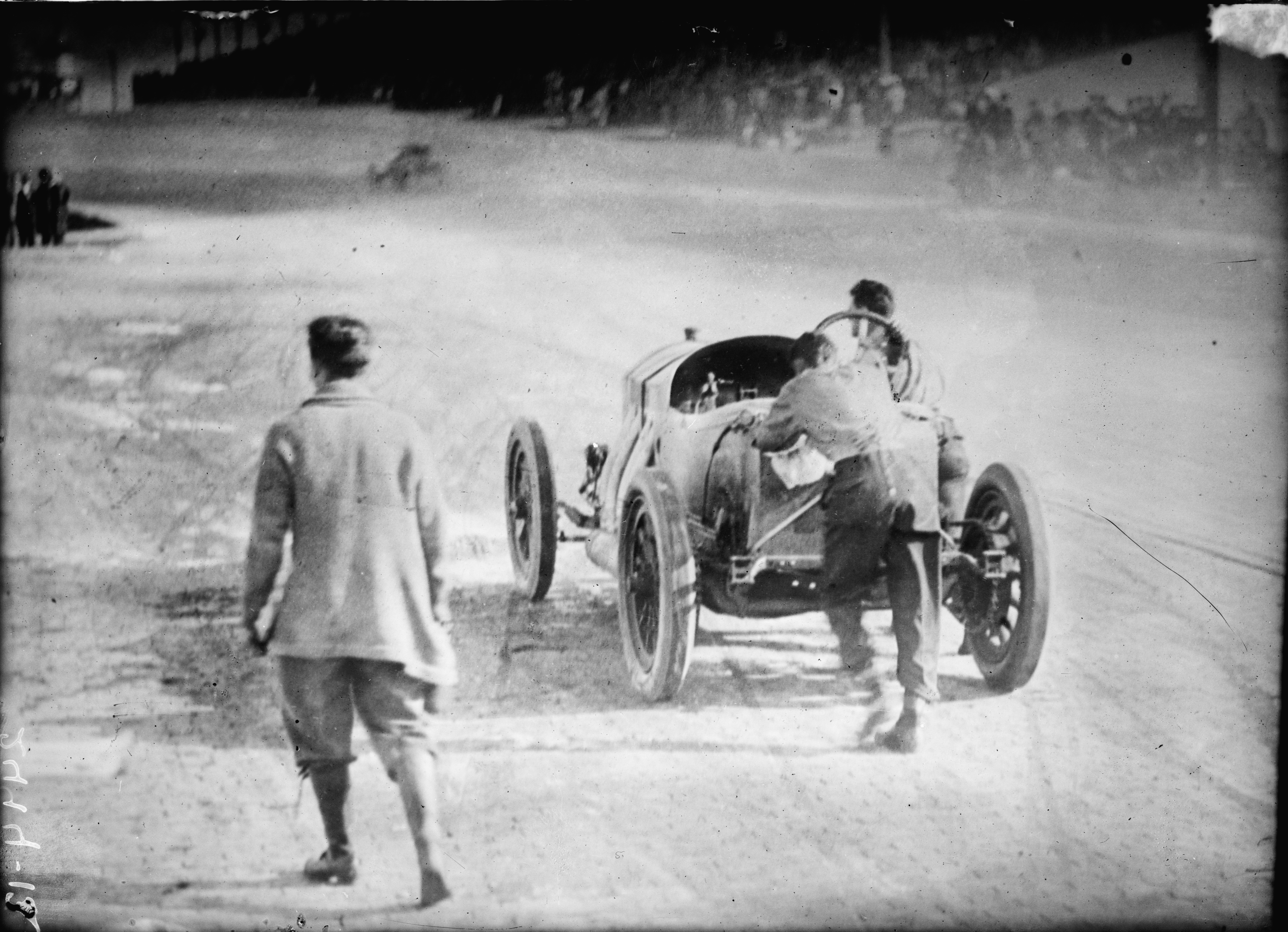
DePalma and his riding mechanic pushing their car at the 1912 Indianapolis 500

DePalma went on to perform strongly that year, but was almost killed in an accident on October 5 at the Grand Prize held in a road course in Milwaukee. After being impaled by a corn stalk, he was hospitalized for 11 weeks; he recovered and was back to racing the following spring.

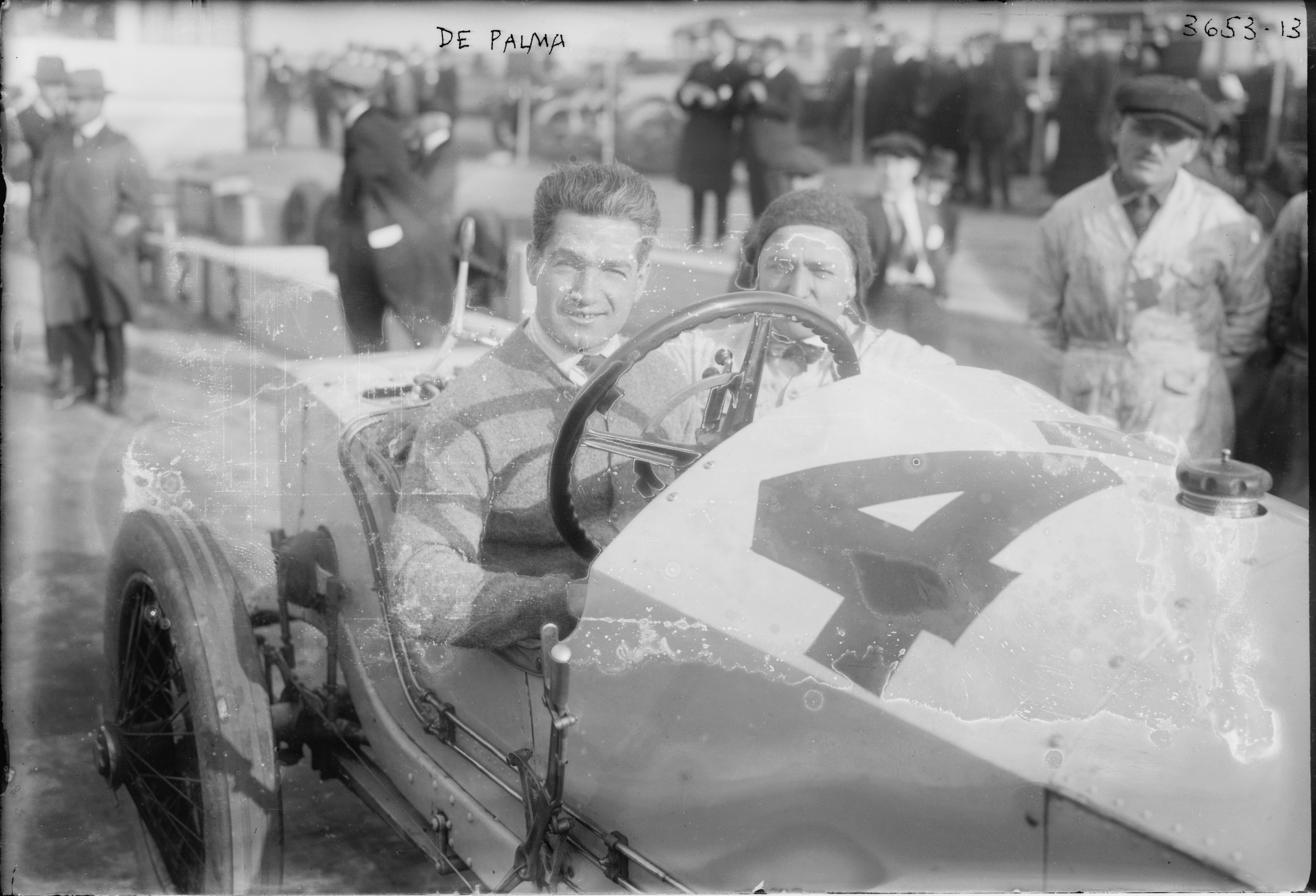
DePalma at the 1915 Indianapolis 500 in one of the Mercedes 4.5 liter GP cars that had won the July 1914 French Grand Prix in a dominating 1-2-3

In 1912 and again in 1914, DePalma won the Elgin Trophy at Elgin, Illinois and in 1914 he scored what he called his greatest victory when he beat Barney Oldfield to capture the Vanderbilt Cup on the roads of Santa Monica, California. He entered the 1914 Indianapolis 500 and qualified, but withdrew before the race claiming he felt his engine could not survive the race. DePalma had been let go by the Mercer Automobile Co. racing team in favor of Barney Oldfield. In a Mercedes "Gray Ghost", he showed he was a master tactician in beating Oldfield's much faster car. He ended 1914 by winning his second U.S. national driving championship. The following year, he drove to victory at the 1915 Indianapolis 500 with one of the Mercedes 4.5 liter GP cars that just before the War had won the July 1914 French Grand Prix in a dominating 1-2-3 triumph.

DePalma became the subject of much controversy the following May, when he held out for appearance money to drive in the 1916 edition of “The Greatest Spectacle in Racing”. Track owner Carl G. Fisher refused, and DePalma did not run in the 1916 Indianapolis 500 race. All was forgiven by September, when the Indianapolis Motor Speedway held a special "Harvest Classic" event and an agreement was reached for the great driver to race one of the Speedway’s Peugeots.

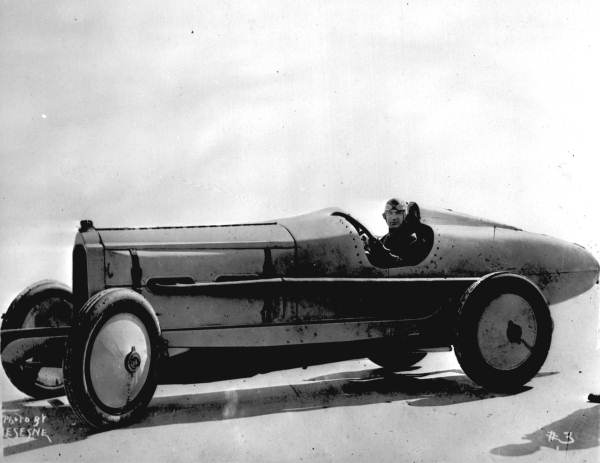
Ralph DePalma and his Packard V-12 in 1919

DePalma was an intense competitor but one of the most popular racers with his fellow drivers and the fans because of his good sportsmanship, a quality he displayed on and off the track. In June 1917 he lost to Barney Oldfield in a series of 10 to 25 mile match races at the Milwaukee Mile. On February 12, 1919, at Daytona Beach, Florida, he drove a Packard to a world speed record of 149.875 mph (241.200 km/h) over a measured mile (1.6 km). International competition began following the adoption of the three liter engine limit in the U.S. and in Europe in 1920. DePalma began the year driving for the French manufacturer, Ballot. His Ballot vehicle won the pole position for the 1920 Indianapolis race and he led for many laps but bad luck dogged him in the race (faulty bearings on the Ballot) and he did not finish. However, DePalma did race his Ballot vehicle in the Elgin Road Race and won his third Elgin trophy in 1920. Then in 1921, DePalma travelled with other Americans to Le Mans to compete in the 1921 French Grand Prix. There, he finished second to the Duesenberg driven by fellow American, Jimmy Murphy. DePalma won the Canadian national championship in 1929.

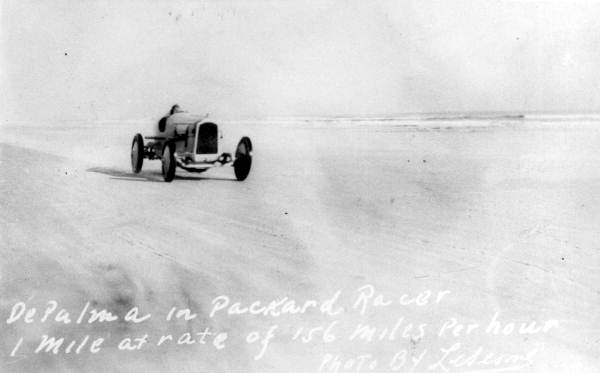
DePalma in his Packard '905' Special in 1919

Around 1920, DePalma established the DePalma Manufacturing Company in Detroit to build race cars and engines for automobiles and aircraft.

DePalma later competed in stock cars until he retired from racing in 1936. He was an honorary referee for the Indianapolis 500, the last time in 1954.

== Death ==
DePalma died at his home in South Pasadena, California, from cancer on March 31, 1956, at age 73. He was interred in the Holy Cross Cemetery in Culver City, California.

== Film appearances ==
DePalma had a small role in the 1920 Hollywood film High Speed and in 1924 played the part of the Champion in an action/drama film written by Wilfred Lucas titled Racing for Life. He also had a cameo in The Cool Hot Rod (1953).

== Family ==
DePalma is the brother of Indianapolis 500 competitor John DePalma and the maternal uncle of 1925 Indianapolis 500 winner Peter DePaolo.

== Awards ==
- In 1973, DePalma was made a posthumous member of the Automotive Hall of Fame in Dearborn, Michigan.
- In 1991, DePalma was inducted into the International Motorsports Hall of Fame.
- DePalma was named to the National Sprint Car Hall of Fame in 1991.
- DePalma was inducted in the Motorsports Hall of Fame of America in 1992.
- DePalma was inducted into the Motorcycle Hall of Fame in 1998.
- In 2006, DePalma was inducted into the Elgin (IL) Sports Hall of Fame.

== Motorsports career results ==
=== Indianapolis 500 results ===
Year	Car	Start	Qual	Rank	Finish	Laps	Led	Retired
1911	2	2	—	12	6	200	4	Running
1912	4	4	86.020	5	11	198	196	Rod
1913	21	12	76.300	24	23	15	0	Bearing
1915	2	2	98.580	2	1	200	132	Running
1919	4	4	98.200	10	6	200	93	Running
1920	2	1	99.150	1	5	200	79	Running
1921	4	1	100.750	1	12	112	108	Rod
1922	17	3	99.550	3	4	200	0	Running
1923	2	11	100.420	5	15	69	0	Head gasket
1925	8	18	108.607	6	7	200	0	Running
Totals						1594	612	

Starts	10
Poles	2
Front Row	5
Wins	1
Top 5	3
Top 10	6
Retired	4

- DePalma's total of 612 laps led stood as the all-time Indianapolis lap leader record until Al Unser surpassed him on the 200th lap of the 1987 Indianapolis 500.

Preceded by René Thomas	Indianapolis 500 Winner; 1915	Succeeded by Dario Resta
