= Wishart =

Wishart may refer to:

== People ==
=== Surname ===
- Adam Wishart (born 1969), British documentary filmmaker
- Arthur Wishart (1903–1986), Canadian politician
- Beatrice Wishart (born 1956), Scottish politician
- Betty Rose Wishart (born 1947), American composer and pianist
- Bobby Wishart (1933–2020), Scottish football player
- Bridget Wishart (born 1962), English musician, and performance artist
- Charles F. Wishart (1870–1960), American Presbyterian clergyman
- Craig Wishart (born 1974), Zimbabwean cricketer
- Eunice Wishart (1898–1982), Canadian politician in Ontario
- Felicity Wishart (1965–2015), Australian conservationist and environmental activist
- Fraser Wishart (born 1965), Scottish football player and commentator
- George Wishart (c. 1513–1546), Scottish religious reformer and Protestant martyr
- Gordon Wishart (born 1960), British surgeon
- Hugh Wishart (fl. 1793-1824), American silversmith
- Ian Wishart (disambiguation), various people
- James Wishart (1659–1723), British admiral and politician
- Jock Wishart (born ?), Scottish maritime and polar adventurer, sportsman, and explorer
- John Wishart (disambiguation), more than one person
- Kenneth Wishart (1908–1972), Guyanese cricketer
- Maria Torrence Wishart (1893–1982), Canadian medical illustrator
- Michael Wishart (1928–1996), English painter
- Pete Wishart (born 1962), Scottish politician
- Peter Wishart (1921–1984), English composer
- Robert Wishart (?–1316), Scottish bishop
- Rod Wishart (born 1968), Australian rugby player
- Spencer Wishart (1889–1914), American race car driver
- Stevie Wishart (born ?), English composer and musician
- Trevor Wishart (born 1946), English composer
- Ty Wishart (born 1988), Canadian ice hockey player
- William Wishart (disambiguation), more than one person

=== Given name ===
- Wishart Bryan Bell (born 1948), American choral conductor, pianist, music educator, and musicologist
- Wishart McLea Robertson (1891–1967), Canadian politician in Nova Scotia
- Wishart Spence (1904–1998), Canadian lawyer and jurist

== Places ==
=== Antarctica ===
- Mount Wishart, a mountain in the Prince Charles Mountains

=== Australia ===
- Wishart, Northern Territory, a suburb
- Wishart, Queensland, a suburb of Brisbane

=== Canada ===
- Wishart, Saskatchewan, a hamlet
- Wishart Island, an island in Nunavut
- Wishart Island (British Columbia)
- Wishart Peninsula on the British Columbia Coast

=== United States ===
- Wishart, Missouri, an unincorporated community
- Wishart, Virginia, an unincorporated community in Accomack County, Virginia

== Other ==
- Wishart baronets, a title in the Baronetage of Nova Scotia
- Wishart distribution, in statistics, a generalization to multiple dimensions of the chi-squared distribution or the gamma distribution
- Lawrence and Wishart, British publishers, successors to Wishart Ltd.
- HMS Wishart (D67), a British destroyer in commission in the Royal Navy from 1920 to 1945
