= Indianapolis 500 records =

As of 110th race, May 24, 2026.

== Race records ==
=== Victories ===
==== Quantity ====
Most driver victories
Wins	Driver	Years			
4	(United States) A. J. Foyt	1961	1964	1967	1977
4	(United States) Al Unser	1970	1971	1978	1987
4	(United States) Rick Mears	1979	1984	1988	1991
4	(Brazil) Hélio Castroneves	2001	2002	2009	2021
See Multiple victories by driver for full listing

Most owner victories Owners with at least four victories
Wins	Owner	Years				
20	(United States) Roger Penske	1972	1979	1981	1984	1985
20	(United States) Roger Penske	1987	1988	1991	1993	1994
20	(United States) Roger Penske	2001	2002	2003	2006	2009
20	(United States) Roger Penske	2015	2018	2019	2023	2024
6	(United States) Chip Ganassi	2000	2008	2010	2012	2022
6	(United States) Chip Ganassi	2025				
5	(United States) Lou Moore	1938	1941	1947	1948	1949
5	(United States) Michael Andretti	2005	2007	2014	2016	2017
4	(United States) A. J. Foyt	1964	1967	1977	1999	
See Teams by number of Indianapolis 500s won for full listing

Most driver-owner victories Driver-owners with at least two victories
Wins	Driver-Owner	Years			Notes
3	(United States) A. J. Foyt	1964	1967	1977	Driver, 1961 winning entry; owner, 1999 winning entry
2	(United States) Louis Meyer	1933	1936		Driver, 1928 winning entry
See Driver/Owners for full listing

Most victorious chassis Chassis-makes with at least five victories
Wins	Chassis	Years									
26*	(Italy) Dallara (Note: From 2008, Dallara was the sole chassis for the series.)	1998	1999	2001	2002	2005	2006	2007	2008	2009	2010
26*	(Italy) Dallara	2011	2012	2013	2014	2015	2016	2017	2018	2019	2020
26*	(Italy) Dallara	2021	2022	2023	2024	2025	2026				
7	(United States) Penske	1979	1981	1988	1989	1991	1993	1994			
6	(United States) Miller	1923	1926	1928	1929	1933	1934				
6	(United States) Watson	1956	1959	1960	1962	1963	1964				
5	(United States) Kurtis Kraft	1950	1951	1953	1954	1955					
5	(United Kingdom) March	1983	1984	1985	1986	1987					
* Independent, team-constructed chassis entries prohibited, 1997 — present.

Most victorious engines Engine-makes with at least five victories
Wins	Engine	Years									
27	(United States) Offenhauser (Note: From 1959–1960, Offenhauser was the sole engine supplier for the series.)	1935	1937	1941	1947	1948	1949	1950	1951	1952	1953
27	(United States) Offenhauser	1954	1955	1956	1957	1958	1959	1960	1961	1962	1963
27	(United States) Offenhauser	1964	1968	1972	1973	1974	1975	1976			
17	(Japan) Honda (Note: From 2006–2011, Honda was the sole engine supplier for the series.)	2004	2005	2006	2007	2008	2009	2010	2011	2012	2014
17	(Japan) Honda	2016	2017	2020	2021	2022	2025	2026			
13	(United States) Chevrolet	1988	1989	1990	1991	1992	1993	2002	2013	2015	2018
13	(United States) Chevrolet	2019	2023	2024							
12	(United States) Miller	1922	1923	1926	1928	1929	1930	1931	1932	1933	1934
12	(United States) Miller	1936	1938								
10	(United Kingdom) Cosworth	1978	1979	1980	1981	1982	1983	1984	1985	1986	1987
8	(United States) Ford*	1965	1966	1967	1969	1970	1971	1995	1996		
5	(United States) Oldsmobile	1997	1998	1999	2000	2001					
* 1995 and 1996 races won by engines labelled as "Ford-Cosworth", but developed by Ford Motor Company, and thus considered Ford entries, after latter's acquisition of the rights to the Cosworth engine after the 1991 season.

Victorious tire brands
Wins	Tire	Years									
77	F (Note: From 1939–1941, 1946–1960 and from 2000, Firestone was the sole tire supplier for the series.)	1911	1913	1920	1921	1922	1923	1924	1925	1926	1927
77	F	1928	1929	1930	1931	1932	1933	1934	1935	1936	1937
77	F	1938	1939	1940	1941	1946	1947	1948	1949	1950	1951
77	F	1952	1953	1954	1955	1956	1957	1958	1959	1960	1961
77	F	1962	1963	1964	1965	1966	1969	1970	1971	1996	1997
77	F	2000	2001	2002	2003	2004	2005	2006	2007	2008	2009
77	F	2010	2011	2012	2013	2014	2015	2016	2017	2018	2019
77	F	2020	2021	2022	2023	2024	2025	2026			
29	G (Note: From 1975–1994, Goodyear was the sole tire supplier for the series.)	1919	1967	1968	1972	1973	1974	1975	1976	1977	1978
29	G	1979	1980	1981	1982	1983	1984	1985	1986	1987	1988
29	G	1989	1990	1991	1992	1993	1994	1995	1998	1999	
2	BF	1915	1916								
1	M	1912									
1	P	1914									

Most victorious car numbers Car numbers carried by at least five winning entries
Wins	No	Years										
11	3	1919	1948	1962	1968	1974	1981	1986	1991	1992	2002	2009
11	2	1915	1921	1929	1939	1969	1970	1976	1978	2015	2023	2024
7	1	1923	1940	1950	1958	1961	1964	1971				
6	5	1935	1959	1983	1985	1988	1997					
6	14	1928	1953	1954	1967	1977	1999					
5	4	1920	1930	1960	1980	1993						
5	6	1937	1955	1984	2003	2006						
Entries assigned one of the first seven digits have won fifty out of one hundred seven races, 46.73%. See Winning car numbers for full listing

Most victorious starting positions Starting positions held by at least ten race winners
Wins	Pos	Years									
21	1 (Pole)	1922	1923	1930	1938	1953	1956	1963	1970	1976	1979
21	1 (Pole)	1980	1981	1988	1991	1994	1997	2004	2006	2008	2009
21	1 (Pole)	2019									
14	3	1939	1947	1948	1968	1972	1975	1984	1989	1990	2007
14	3	2010	2018	2020	2024						
11	2	1915	1919	1925	1937	1940	1951	1960	1962	1965	1969
11	2	2000									
Entries starting from the first row have won forty-five out of one hundred seven races, 42.05%. See Winning starting positions for full listing

==== Quality ====
Rookie winners Inaugural race inclusive, ten drivers have won the race in their first start*, and one driver has won it in his first two starts. Rookie winners have occurred in ten out of one hundred races, 10%, in two consecutive years twice (1913 — 1914, 2000 — 2001), and in three consecutive years once (1926 — 1928).
Years		Driver	Career; Victories			
1911		(United States) Ray Harroun	1911			
1913		(France) Jules Goux	1913			
1914		(United States) René Thomas	1914			
1926		(United States) Frank Lockhart	1926			
1927		(United States) George Souders	1927			
1928		(United States) Louis Meyer	1928	1933	1936	
1966		(United Kingdom) Graham Hill	1966			
2000		(Colombia) Juan Pablo Montoya	2000	2015		
2001	2002	(Brazil) Hélio Castroneves	2001	2002	2009	2021
2016		(United States) Alexander Rossi	2016			
* (United States) Louis Meyer won in his first start in 1928, but had competed a year earlier as a relief driver for (United States) Wilbur Shaw.

Consecutive driver victories
Wins	Driver	Career Victories			
2	(United States) Wilbur Shaw	1937	1939	1940	
2	(United States) Mauri Rose	1941	1947	1948	
2	(United States) Bill Vukovich	1953	1954		
2	(United States) Al Unser	1970	1971	1978	1987
2	(Brazil) Hélio Castroneves	2001	2002	2009	2021
2	(United States) Josef Newgarden	2023	2024		

Most races between victories Ten drivers have intervals between race victories extending five or more races*.
Years	Driver	Career Victories			
15	(Colombia) Juan Pablo Montoya	2000	2015		
12	(Brazil) Hélio Castroneves	2001	2002	2009	2021
10	(United States) A. J. Foyt	1961	1964	1967	1977
9	(United States) Gordon Johncock	1973	1982		
9	(United States) Al Unser	1970	1971	1978	1987
7	(United States) Bobby Unser	1968	1975	1981	
7	(Netherlands) Arie Luyendyk	1990	1997		
7	(Brazil) Hélio Castroneves	2001	2002	2009	2021
6	(United States) Bobby Unser	1968	1975	1981	
6	(United Kingdom) Dan Wheldon	2005	2011		
5	(United States) Louis Meyer	1928	1933	1936	
5	(United States) Rick Mears	1979	1984	1988	1991
* (United States) Mauri Rose's 1947 victory occurred six years after his co-victory with (United States) Floyd Davis in 1941, but only two races later due to the cancellation of the race, 1942—1945, due to World War II.

Most races between first and last victories Five drivers have won multiple victories across a time period of at least ten races.
Years	Driver	Career Victories			
20	(Brazil) Hélio Castroneves	2001	2002	2009	2021
17	(United States) Al Unser	1970	1971	1978	1987
16	(United States) A. J. Foyt	1961	1964	1967	1977
15	(Colombia) Juan Pablo Montoya	2000	2015		
13	(United States) Bobby Unser	1968	1975	1981	
12	(United States) Rick Mears	1979	1984	1988	1991

Most starts before first victory Eight drivers have won the race for the first time after ten or more career starts.
Starts	Driver	Career Victories		
13	(United States) Sam Hanks	1957		
12	(Brazil) Tony Kanaan	2013		
12	(United States) Josef Newgarden	2023	2024	
11	(United States) Jim Rathmann	1960		
11	(United States) Johnny Rutherford	1974	1976	1980
11	(Australia) Will Power	2018		
10	(United States) Tom Sneva	1983		
10	(United States) Al Unser Jr.	1992	1994	

- Defending champion finishing second: 9
  - (United States) Louis Meyer, 1929
  - (United States) Wilbur Shaw, 1938
  - (United States) Bill Holland, 1950
  - (United States) Rodger Ward, 1960
  - (United Kingdom) Jim Clark, 1966
  - (United States) Al Unser, 1972
  - (United States) Johnny Rutherford, 1975
  - (Brazil) Hélio Castroneves, 2003
  - (Sweden) Marcus Ericsson, 2023
- Defending second place-finisher winning: 14
  - (United Kingdom) Dario Resta, 1916
  - (United States) Fred Frame, 1932
  - (United States) Wilbur Shaw, 1939
  - (United States) Bill Holland*, 1949
  - (United States) Johnnie Parsons, 1950
  - (United States) Sam Hanks, 1957
  - (United States) Jim Rathmann, 1960
  - (United States) Bobby Unser, 1975
  - (United States) Johnny Rutherford, 1976
  - (United States) A. J. Foyt, 1977
  - (Brazil) Emerson Fittipaldi, 1989
  - (Canada) Jacques Villeneuve, 1995
  - (New Zealand) Scott Dixon, 2008
  - (United Kingdom) Dan Wheldon*, 2011

* Won after two consecutive second-place finishes.

- Co-winners (one driver starting a race but another driver finishing in the same winning entry): 2
  - (United States) Lora L. Corum / (United States) Joe Boyer, 1924
  - (United States) Floyd Davis / (United States) Mauri Rose, 1941
- Victories by drivers who never led a race lap in career: 2 (Corum and Davis, in those same years)
- Won Triple Crown of Motorsport (Indianapolis 500, Monaco Grand Prix, and 24 Hours of Le Mans):
  - (United Kingdom) Graham Hill (1966 / 1963, 1964, 1965, 1968, 1969 / 1972)
- Won Indianapolis 500, F1 World Championship and 24 Hours of Le Mans):
  - (United Kingdom) Graham Hill (1966 / 1962, 1968 / 1972)
- Won Indianapolis 500 and F1 World Championship: 5
  - (United Kingdom) Jim Clark (1965 / 1963, 1965)
  - (United Kingdom) Graham Hill (1966 / 1962, 1968)
  - (United States) Mario Andretti (1969 / 1978)
  - (Brazil) Emerson Fittipaldi (1989, 1993 / 1972, 1974)
  - (Canada) Jacques Villeneuve (1995 / 1997)
- Won Indianapolis 500 and 24 Hours of Le Mans: 2
  - (United States) A. J. Foyt (1961, 1964, 1967, 1977 / 1967)
  - (United Kingdom) Graham Hill (1966 / 1972)
- Won Indianapolis 500 and 24 Hours of Daytona:
  - (United States) A. J. Foyt (1961, 1964, 1967, 1977 / 1983, 1985)
  - (United States) Al Unser (1970, 1971, 1978, 1987 / 1985)
  - (United States) Mark Donohue (1972 / 1969)
  - (United States) Mario Andretti (1969 / 1972* shortened due to gas shortage)
  - (United States) Bobby Rahal (1986 / 1981)
  - (Netherlands) Arie Luyendyk (1990, 1997 / 1998)
  - (United States) Al Unser Jr. (1992, 1994 / 1986, 1987)
  - (Colombia) Juan Pablo Montoya (2000, 2015 / 2007, 2008, 2013)
  - (United Kingdom) Dan Wheldon (2005, 2011 / 2006)
  - (New Zealand) Scott Dixon (2008 / 2006, 2015, 2020)
  - (United States) Buddy Rice (2004 / 2009)
  - (United Kingdom) Dario Franchitti (2007, 2010, 2012 / 2008)
  - (Brazil) Tony Kanaan (2013 / 2015)
  - (Brazil) Helio Castroneves (2001, 2002, 2009, 2021 / 2021, 2022, 2023)
  - (United States) Alexander Rossi (2016 / 2021)
  - (France) Simon Pagenaud (2019 / 2022, 2023)
  - (United States) Josef Newgarden (2023, 2024 / 2024)
- Won Indianapolis 500 and Monaco Grand Prix:
  - (United Kingdom) Graham Hill (1966 / 1963, 1964, 1965, 1968, 1969)
  - (Colombia) Juan Pablo Montoya (2000, 2015 / 2003)
- Won Indianapolis 500 and 12 Hours of Sebring:
  - (United States) Mario Andretti (1969 / 1967, 1970, 1972)
  - (United States) A. J. Foyt (1961, 1964, 1967, 1977 / 1985)
  - (United States) Bobby Rahal (1986 / 1987)
  - (Netherlands) Arie Luyendyk (1990, 1997 / 1989)
  - (United States) Ryan Hunter-Reay (2014 / 2020)
- Won Indianapolis 500 and Daytona 500:
  - (United States) Mario Andretti (1969 / 1967)
  - (United States) A. J. Foyt (1961, 1964, 1967, 1977 / 1972)
- Won Indianapolis 500 and Petit Le Mans:
  - (United States) Ryan Hunter-Reay (2014 / 2018)
  - (New Zealand) Scott Dixon (2008 / 2020)
  - (Brazil) Hélio Castroneves (2001, 2002, 2009, 2021 / 2022, 2023)
- Won Indianapolis 500, F1 World Championship, and Daytona 500:
  - (United States) Mario Andretti (1969 / 1978 / 1967)
- Won Indianapolis 500, 24 Hours of Le Mans, and Daytona 500:
  - (United States) A. J. Foyt (1961, 1964, 1967, 1977 / 1967 / 1972)

Narrowest Margin of Victory:

- 0.0233 seconds, (Sweden) Felix Rosenqvist over (United States) David Malukas, 2026

Widest Margin of Victory:

- Preceding 1966 (first year of top five finishing entry being flagged off before completing 500 miles):
  - 13 minutes, 8 seconds, (France) Jules Goux over (United States) Spencer Wishart, 1913
- Succeeding 1966 (year inclusive):
  - 2 laps +0:00.021, (United States) Rick Mears over (Colombia) Roberto Guerrero, 1984
  - 2 laps, (United States) A. J. Foyt over (United States) Al Unser, 1967 (race red flagged, second place reverted to last completed lap)
  - 2 laps, (Brazil) Emerson Fittipaldi over (United States) Al Unser Jr., 1989 (second place car did not finish 199th lap, third place 6 laps behind leader)

== Speed and qualification records ==
=== Lap speed records ===
All-Time Lap Speed Records
Type	Distance			Driver	Time	Average Speed		Date
Type	Laps	Mi	Km	Driver	Time	mph	km/h	Date
Practice (unofficial)*	1	2.5	4.0	(Netherlands) Arie Luyendyk	00:37.616	239.260	385.052	May 10, 1996
Qualifying	1	2.5	4.0	(Netherlands) Arie Luyendyk	00:37.895	237.498	382.216	May 12, 1996
Qualifying	4	10.0	16.1	(Netherlands) Arie Luyendyk	02:31.908	236.986	381.392	May 12, 1996
Qualifying (Pole Run)	4	10.0	16.1	(New Zealand) Scott McLaughlin	02:33.7017	234.220	376.940	May 19, 2024
Race	1	2.5	4.0	(United States) Eddie Cheever	00:38.119	236.103	379.971	May 26, 1996
* Official time and speed records recorded only in direct qualifying or race competition

=== Pole positions ===
Most pole positions Ten drivers have qualified for at least three pole positions
Poles	Driver	Years					
6	(United States) Rick Mears	1979	1982	1986	1988	1989	1991
5	(New Zealand) Scott Dixon	2008	2015	2017	2021	2022	
4	(United States) Rex Mays	1935	1936	1940	1948		
4	(United States) A. J. Foyt	1965	1969	1974	1975		
4	(Brazil) Hélio Castroneves	2003	2007	2009	2010		
3	(United States) Mario Andretti	1966	1967	1987			
3	(United States) Johnny Rutherford	1973	1976	1980			
3	(United States) Tom Sneva	1977	1978	1984			
3	(Netherlands) Arie Luyendyk	1993	1997	1999			
3	(United States) Ed Carpenter	2013	2014	2018			
See Multiple pole positions for full list, multiple-pole-winning drivers

Consecutive pole position qualifications Twelve drivers have qualified for the pole position in consecutive years.
Poles	Driver	Career Pole Positions					
2	(United States) Ralph DePalma	1920	1921				
2	(United States) Rex Mays	1935	1936	1940	1948		
2	(United States) Eddie Sachs	1960	1961				
2	(United States) Parnelli Jones	1962	1963				
2	(United States) Mario Andretti	1966	1967	1987			
2	(United States) A. J. Foyt	1965	1969	1974	1975		
2	(United States) Tom Sneva	1977	1978	1984			
2	(United States) Rick Mears	1979	1982	1986	1988	1989	1991
2	(United States) Scott Brayton*	1995	1996*				
2	(Brazil) Hélio Castroneves	2003	2007	2009	2010		
2	(United States) Ed Carpenter	2013	2014	2018			
2	(New Zealand) Scott Dixon	2008	2015	2017	2021	2022	
* (United States) Scott Brayton qualified for the pole position in 1996, but was killed in a practice session accident nine days before the race in a backup car. Tony Stewart, the second qualifier, moved onto the pole position Brayton's stead, while Danny Ongais, per regulations, started the pole-winning car from the final starting position.

Most races between pole position qualifications Five* drivers have intervals between pole positions extending five or more races.
Years	Driver	Career; Pole Positions				
20	(United States) Mario Andretti	1966	1967	1987		
9	(United States) Bobby Unser	1972	1981			
7	(New Zealand) Scott Dixon	2008	2015	2017	2021	2022
5	(United States) A. J. Foyt	1965	1969	1974	1975	
* (United States) Rex Mays' 1948 pole position qualification occurred eight years after qualifying for it in 1940, but only four races later due to the cancellation of the race, from 1942—1945, due to World War II.

=== Average race speeds ===
Fastest Races; Fifteen races have been run in under three hours.
Year	Driver	Team	Time	Average Speed (mph)
2021	(Brazil) Hélio Castroneves	Meyer Shank Racing	2:37:19.4043	190.690
2013	(Brazil) Tony Kanaan	KV Racing Technology	2:40:03.4181	187.433
2014	(United States) Ryan Hunter-Reay	Andretti Autosport	2:40:48.2305	186.563
1990	(Netherlands) Arie Luyendyk	Doug Shierson Racing	2:41:18.414	185.981
1991	(United States) Rick Mears	Penske Racing	2:50:00.785	176.460
2019	(France) Simon Pagenaud	Team Penske	2:50:39.2797	175.794
2022	(Sweden) Marcus Ericsson	Chip Ganassi Racing	2:51:00.6432	175.428
1986	(United States) Bobby Rahal	Truesports	2:55:43.470	170.722
2011	(United Kingdom) Dan Wheldon	Bryan Herta Autosport	2:56:11.7267	170.265
2025	(Spain) Álex Palou	Chip Ganassi Racing	2:57:38.2965	168.883
2023	(United States) Josef Newgarden	Team Penske	2:58:21.9611	168.193
2024	(United States) Josef Newgarden	Team Penske	2:58:49.4079	167.763
2012	(United Kingdom) Dario Franchitti	Chip Ganassi Racing	2:58:51.2532	167.734
2000	(Colombia) Juan Pablo Montoya	Chip Ganassi Racing	2:58:59.431	167.607
1989	(Brazil) Emerson Fittipaldi	Patrick Racing	2:59:01.040	167.581

Decade Slowest Winning Average Speed
Year	Driver	Team	Time	Average Speed (mph)
1911	(United States) Ray Harroun	Marmon	6:42:08	74.602
1920	(United States) Gaston Chevrolet	Frontenac	5:38:32	88.618
1931	(United States) Louis Schneider	Bowes Seal Fast	5:10:27.93	96.629
1940	(United States) Wilbur Shaw	Maserati	4:22:31.17	114.277
1950	(United States) Johnnie Parsons	Kurtis Kraft	2:46:55.97*	124.022
1960	(United States) Jim Rathmann	Ken-Paul	3:36:11.36	138.767
1976	(United States) Johnny Rutherford	Team McLaren	1:42:52.48*	148.725
1981	(United States) Bobby Unser	Penske Racing	3:35:41.78	139.184
1992	(United States) Al Unser Jr.	Galles-Kraco	3:43:05.148	134.477
2004	(United States) Buddy Rice	Rahal Letterman	3:14:55.2395*	138.518
2017	(Japan) Takuma Sato	Andretti Autosport	3:13:03.3584	155.395
* Rain-shortened

Slowest Finishing Average Speed
Year	Driver	Team	Time	Average Speed (mph)	Pos
1912	(United States) Ralph Mulford	Knox	8:53:00	56.29	10

== Lap leader records ==
Most career laps led Seven drivers have led five hundred or more race laps during their career.
Rank	Driver	Laps Led	Career Laps Run	Career Lap Leader Percentage	Race Wins	Years Won			
1	(New Zealand) Scott Dixon	709	Active driver		1	2008			
2	(United States) Al Unser	644	4,356	14.78%	4	1970	1971	1978	1987
3	(United States) Ralph DePalma	612	1,594	38.39%	1	1915			
4	(United States) Mario Andretti	556	3,040	18.29%	1	1969			
5	(United States) A. J. Foyt	555	4,909	11.31%	4	1961	1964	1967	1977
6	(United States) Wilbur Shaw	508	2,019	25.16%	3	1937	1939	1940	
7	(Brazil) Emerson Fittipaldi	505	1,785	28.29%	2	1989	1993		
See Lap Leaders for full listing

Most races led Eight drivers have led at least ten races Background colors designate finishing position
Races; Led	Driver	Years				
17	(New Zealand) Scott Dixon	2003	2006	2007	2008	2009
17	(New Zealand) Scott Dixon	2011	2012	2013	2014	2015
17	(New Zealand) Scott Dixon	2017	2019	2020	2021	2022
17	(New Zealand) Scott Dixon	2024	2026			
15	(Brazil) Tony Kanaan	2002	2003	2004	2005	2006
15	(Brazil) Tony Kanaan	2007	2008	2012	2013	2014
15	(Brazil) Tony Kanaan	2015	2016	2017	2018	2022
14	(Brazil) Hélio Castroneves	2001	2002	2003	2006	2007
14	(Brazil) Hélio Castroneves	2009	2010	2013	2014	2015
14	(Brazil) Hélio Castroneves	2016	2017	2021	2023	
13	(United States) A. J. Foyt	1961	1962	1964	1965	1967
13	(United States) A. J. Foyt	1969	1970	1974	1975	1976
13	(United States) A. J. Foyt	1977	1979	1982		
11	(United States) Al Unser	1970	1971	1973	1977	1978
11	(United States) Al Unser	1979	1983	1987	1988	1992
11	(United States) Al Unser	1993				
11	(United States) Mario Andretti	1966	1969	1980	1981	1984
11	(United States) Mario Andretti	1985	1987	1989	1991	1992
11	(United States) Mario Andretti	1993				
10	(United States) Bobby Unser	1968	1971	1972	1973	1974
10	(United States) Bobby Unser	1975	1977	1979	1980	1981
10	(Australia) Will Power	2010	2013	2014	2015	2016
10	(Australia) Will Power	2017	2018	2019	2020	2023

Most consecutive races led Twelve drivers have led in five or more consecutive* races.
Years		Driver
8	2013—2020	(Australia) Will Power
7	2002—2008	(Brazil) Tony Kanaan
7	2012—2018	(Brazil) Tony Kanaan
6	1979—1984	(United States) Rick Mears
6	2011—2016	(Canada) Alex Tagliani
6	2021—2026	(Spain) Álex Palou
6	2021—2026	(Mexico) Pato O'Ward
5	1938—1946	(United States) Rex Mays
5	1940—1948	(United States) Mauri Rose
5	1971—1975	(United States) Bobby Unser
5	1980—1984	(United States) Tom Sneva
5	2011—2015	(New Zealand) Scott Dixon
5	2013—2017	(Brazil) Hélio Castroneves
* (United States) Rex Mays and (United States) Mauri Rose led the race in periods extending nine years each, but are counted as leading in five consecutive due to the cancellation of the race, from 1942—1945, due to World War II.

Most race laps led by winning entry Seven entries, all to date starting from the front row**, have won in dominant fashion, leading eighty percent or more of a given race's completed laps.
Laps; Led	Distance; Led		Percent; Race Led	Year	Winning Driver	Start; Pos
Laps; Led	mi	km	Percent; Race Led	Year	Winning Driver	Start; Pos
198	495	796.6	99.0%	1930	(United States) Billy Arnold	1
195	487.5	784.6	97.5%	1953	(United States) Bill Vukovich	1
190	475	764.4	95.0%	1965	(United Kingdom) Jim Clark	2
190	475	764.4	95.0%	1970	(United States) Al Unser	1
167	417.5	671.9	83.5%	1963	(United States) Parnelli Jones	1
167	417.5	671.9	83.5%	2000	(Colombia) Juan Pablo Montoya	2
103*	257.5*	414.4*	85.8%*	1916	(United Kingdom) Dario Resta	4**
* Race scheduled for 120 laps, 300 mi. (482.8 km) ** With four-wide starts occurring in years 1913—1920, Dario Resta started on the front row in 1916.

Fewest race laps led by winning entry Five entries have won despite leading only five percent or less of a given race's completed laps.
Laps; Led	Distance; Led		Percent; Race Led	Year	Driver	Start; Pos
Laps; Led	mi	km	Percent; Race Led	Year	Driver	Start; Pos
1	2.5	4.0	0.5%	2011	(United Kingdom) Dan Wheldon	6
2	5	8.1	1.0%	1912	(United States) Joe Dawson	3
5	12.5	20.1	2.5%	2023	(United States) Josef Newgarden	17
9	22.5	36.2	4.5%	2015	(Colombia) Juan Pablo Montoya	15
10	25	40.2	5.0%	1966	(United Kingdom) Graham Hill	15

Most race laps led by non-winning entry Four entries have failed to win despite dominating to lead eighty percent or more of a given race's completed laps.
Laps; Led	Distance; Led		Percent; Race Led	Year	Driver	Start; Pos	Final; Pos
Laps; Led	mi	km	Percent; Race Led	Year	Driver	Start; Pos	Final; Pos
196	490	788.6	98.0%	1912	(United States) Ralph DePalma	7	11
171	427.5	688.0	85.5%	1967	(United States) Parnelli Jones	6	6
170	425	684.0	85.0%	1987	(United States) Mario Andretti	1	9
160	400	643.7	80.0%	1992	(United States) Michael Andretti	6	13

Most laps led from start Two entries, both starting from the pole position, have led the opening forty percent or further of a given race's completed laps.
Laps	Year	Driver	Full; Laps; Led	Percent; Race Led	Start; Pos	Final; Pos
92	1990	(Brazil) Emerson Fittipaldi	128	64.0%	1	3
81	1927	(United States) Frank Lockhart	110	55.0%	1	18

Latest lead change Races with final lead change taking place at or within three laps of finish
Lap	Year	Winner	Overtaken
200	2006	(United States) Sam Hornish Jr.	(United States) Marco Andretti
200	2011	(United Kingdom) Dan Wheldon	(United States) J. R. Hildebrand
200	2023	(United States) Josef Newgarden	(Sweden) Marcus Ericsson
200	2026	(Sweden) Felix Rosenqvist	(United States) David Malukas
199	1912	(United States) Joe Dawson	(United States) Ralph DePalma
199	1989	(Brazil) Emerson Fittipaldi	(United States) Al Unser Jr.
199	1999	(Sweden) Kenny Bräck	(United States) Robby Gordon
199	2012	(United Kingdom) Dario Franchitti	(New Zealand) Scott Dixon
199	2019	(France) Simon Pagenaud	(United States) Alexander Rossi
199	2021	(Brazil) Hélio Castroneves	(Spain) Álex Palou
198	1961	(United States) A. J. Foyt	(United States) Eddie Sachs
198	1986	(United States) Bobby Rahal	(United States) Kevin Cogan
198	2013	(Brazil) Tony Kanaan	(United States) Ryan Hunter-Reay

Led opening lap and final lap: 21 entries among 19 drivers

- Jimmy Murphy, 1922
- Joe Boyer, 1924 (only occasion of occurrence in separate entries)
- Peter DePaolo, 1925
- Lee Wallard, 1951
- Bill Vukovich, 1953
- Jimmy Bryan, 1958
- Jim Clark, 1965
- Mario Andretti, 1969
- Al Unser, 1970
- Johnny Rutherford, 1976
- Johnny Rutherford, 1980
- Bobby Unser, 1981
- Rick Mears, 1984
- Emerson Fittipaldi, 1989
- Rick Mears, 1991
- Al Unser Jr., 1994
- Buddy Rice, 2004
- Scott Dixon, 2008
- Hélio Castroneves, 2009
- Dario Franchitti, 2010
- Simon Pagenaud, 2019

Led opening lap, consecutive races Nine drivers have led the opening race lap in consecutive races.
Years		Driver
2	1922—1923	(United States) Jimmy Murphy
2	1928—1929	(United States) Leon Duray
2	1935—1936	(United States) Rex Mays
2	1940—1941	(United States) Rex Mays
2	1954—1955	(United States) Jack McGrath
2	1964—1965	(United Kingdom) Jim Clark
2	1972—1973	(United States) Bobby Unser
2	1989—1990	(Brazil) Emerson Fittipaldi
2	1996—1997	(United States) Tony Stewart
2	2022—2023	(Spain) Álex Palou

Most laps led by rookie Six drivers have led forty percent or further distance of a given race in their first year of competition.
Laps	Percent; Race Led	Year	Driver	Start; Pos	Final; Pos
167	83.5%	2000	(Colombia) Juan Pablo Montoya	2	1
143	71.5%	1947	(United States) Bill Holland	8	2
138	69.0%	1913	(France) Jules Goux	7	1
102	51.0%	1914	(France) René Thomas	15	1
95	59.4%	1926	(United States) Frank Lockhart	20	1
85	42.5%	2002	(South Africa) Tomas Scheckter	10	26

=== Age records ===
Top ten oldest winners
Year	Driver	Age		
Year	Driver	Descriptive		Exact; Days
Year	Driver	Years	Days	Exact; Days
1987	(United States) Al Unser	47	360	17,527
1981	(United States) Bobby Unser	47	93	17,260
1993	(Brazil) Emerson Fittipaldi	46	169	16,971
2021	(Brazil) Hélio Castroneves	46	20	16,822
1982	(United States) Gordon Johncock	45	278	16,714
1997	(Netherlands) Arie Luyendyk	43	248	15,954
2020	(Japan) Takuma Sato	43	208	15,913
1957	(United States) Sam Hanks	42	320	15,661
1989	(Brazil) Emerson Fittipaldi	42	167	15,508
1977	(United States) A. J. Foyt	42	133	15,474

Top ten youngest winners
Year	Driver	Age		
Year	Driver	Descriptive		Exact; Days
Year	Driver	Years	Days	Exact; Days
1952	(United States) Troy Ruttman	22	80	8,116
1912	(United States) Joe Dawson	22	318	8,352
1926	(United States) Frank Lockhart	23	53	8,454
1928	(United States) Louis Meyer	23	314	8,714
1995	(Canada) Jacques Villeneuve	24	49	8,815
1930	(United States) Billy Arnold	24	165	8,931
2016	(United States) Alexander Rossi	24	247	9,013
2000	(Colombia) Juan Pablo Montoya	24	251	9,017
1924	(United States) Lora L. Corum*	25	143	9,273
2001	(Brazil) Hélio Castroneves	26	17	9,514
* 1924 winning entry credited with two winning drivers, with Corum starting, but race lead assumed only after relief, and eventual drive to victory, by (United States) Joe Boyer.

Oldest Starter:

- (United States) A. J. Foyt Jr., 57 years, 128 days old, 1992

Youngest Starter:

- (United States) A. J. Foyt IV, 19 years, 0 days old, 2003

== Miscellaneous competitive records ==
Most race starts Thirteen drivers have started at least twenty races.
Starts	Driver	Career Victories				Notes
35	(United States) A. J. Foyt	1961	1964	1967	1977	1958—1992, consecutive
29	(United States) Mario Andretti	1969				
27	(United States) Al Unser	1970	1971	1978	1987	
26	(Brazil) Hélio Castroneves	2001	2002	2009	2021	
24	(United States) Johnny Rutherford	1974	1976	1980		
24	(United States) Gordon Johncock	1973	1982			
24	(New Zealand) Scott Dixon	2008				
23	(United States) Ed Carpenter					Most starts without winning
22	(United States) George Snider					
22	(Brazil) Tony Kanaan	2013				
21	(United States) Gary Bettenhausen					
20	(United States) Buddy Lazier	1996				
20	(United States) Marco Andretti					

Best Female Driver Finishes; Races with one or more female drivers finishing in the top ten
Year	Start; Pos	Final; Pos	Driver	Notes
2009	10	3	(United States) Danica Patrick	
2005	4	4	(United States) Danica Patrick	Led 19 laps; first female driver leader
2010	23	6	(United States) Danica Patrick	
2006	10	8	(United States) Danica Patrick	
2007	8	8	(United States) Danica Patrick	
1978	15	9	(United States) Janet Guthrie	First top ten, female driver
2011	25	10	(United States) Danica Patrick	Led 10 laps; most recent female driver leader

Most Leaders in Race; Races with more than ten race leaders
Leaders	Year	Winner
16	2024	(United States) Josef Newgarden
15	2017	(Japan) Takuma Sato
15	2018	(Australia) Will Power
14	2013	(Brazil) Tony Kanaan
14	2023	(United States) Josef Newgarden
14	2025	(Spain) Álex Palou
14	2026	(Sweden) Felix Rosenqvist
13	2016	(United States) Alexander Rossi
13	2021	(Brazil) Hélio Castroneves
12	1993	(Brazil) Emerson Fittipaldi
11	2014	(United States) Ryan Hunter-Reay

Fewest Leaders in Race; Races with three or fewer race leaders
Leaders	Year	Winner
2	1930	(United States) Billy Arnold
2	1965	(United Kingdom) Jim Clark
3	1912	(United States) Joe Dawson
3	1916	(United Kingdom) Dario Resta
3	1919	(United States) Howdy Wilcox
3	1938	(United States) Floyd Roberts
3	1940	(United States) Wilbur Shaw
3	1947	(United States) Mauri Rose
3	1950	(United States) Johnnie Parsons
3	1952	(United States) Troy Ruttman
3	1967	(United States) A. J. Foyt
3	1968	(United States) Bobby Unser
3	1990	(Netherlands) Arie Luyendyk
3	1994	(United States) Al Unser Jr.

Most Starters in Race; Races with more than 33 starting entries
Started	Year	Winner	Notes
42	1933	(United States) Louis Meyer	Full field
40	1911	(United States) Ray Harroun	Unlimited potential field size; 40 entries achieving required minimum speed
40	1931	(United States) Louis Schneider	Full field
40	1932	(United States) Fred Frame	Full field
38	1930	(United States) Billy Arnold	40 potential starting positions
35	1979	(United States) Rick Mears	2 further starting positions allotted from technical regulations ruling
35	1997	(Netherlands) Arie Luyendyk	2 further starting positions allotted from technical regulations ruling

Fewest Starters in Race; Races with fewer than 33 starting entries
Started	Year	Winner	Notes
21	1916	(United Kingdom) Dario Resta	30 potential starting positions
22	1924	(United States) Lora L. Corum	33 potential starting positions Corum and Boyer, co-drivers of winning entry
22	1924	(United States) Joe Boyer	33 potential starting positions Corum and Boyer, co-drivers of winning entry
22	1925	(United States) Peter DePaolo	33 potential starting positions
23	1920	(United States) Gaston Chevrolet	33 potential starting positions
23	1921	(United States) Tommy Milton	33 potential starting positions
24	1912	(United States) Joe Dawson	30 potential starting positions
24	1915	(United States) Ralph DePalma	33 potential starting positions
24	1923	(United States) Tommy Milton	33 potential starting positions
27	1913	(France) Jules Goux	30 potential starting positions
27	1922	(United States) Jimmy Murphy	33 potential starting positions
28	1926	(United States) Frank Lockhart	33 potential starting positions
29	1928	(United States) Louis Meyer	33 potential starting positions
30	1914	(France) René Thomas	Full field
30	1947	(United States) Mauri Rose	33 potential starting positions

Most Lead Changes in Race; Races with twenty-five or more lead changes
Lead; Changes	Year	Winner
70	2026	(Sweden) Felix Rosenqvist
68	2013	(Brazil) Tony Kanaan
54	2016	(United States) Alexander Rossi
52	2023	(United States) Josef Newgarden
48	2024	(United States) Josef Newgarden
38	2022	(Sweden) Marcus Ericsson
37	2015	(Colombia) Juan Pablo Montoya
35	2017	(Japan) Takuma Sato
35	2021	(Brazil) Hélio Castroneves
34	2012	(United Kingdom) Dario Franchitti
34	2014	(United States) Ryan Hunter-Reay
30	2018	(Australia) Will Power
29	1960	(United States) Jim Rathmann
29	2019	(France) Simon Pagenaud
28	1923	(United States) Tommy Milton
27	2005	(United Kingdom) Dan Wheldon

Fewest Lead Changes in Race; Races with three or fewer lead changes
Lead; Changes	Year	Winner
1	1930	(United States) Billy Arnold
2	1912	(United States) Joe Dawson
2	1916	(United Kingdom) Dario Resta
3	1919	(United States) Howdy Wilcox
3	1931	(United States) Louis Schneider
3	1949	(United States) Bill Holland

Most former winners starting race:

- 10 – 1992

Fewest former winners starting race:

- 0 – 1912

Most rookies starting race:

- 19 – 1919, 1930 (excluding first race's 40 starters)

Fewest rookies starting race:

- 1 – 1939, 1979

Most cars running at finish:

- 30 – 2021

Fewest cars running at finish:

- 7 – 1966

Most occasions running at finish:

- 23, Hélio Castroneves

Greatest improvement from starting position to finishing position (all-time):

- 32 positions, 38th to 6th, Zeke Meyer, 1932

Greatest improvement from starting position to finishing position (33-car field):

- 31 positions, 33rd to 2nd Tom Sneva, 1980
- 31 positions, 33rd to 2nd Scott Goodyear, 1992

Most consecutive laps completed without falling out of competition:

- 2,310 laps, Hélio Castroneves, 2007-2018 (from the start of the 2007 race through lap 145 of 2018 race)

Most cars and teams entered

- 117, 1984

=== Race conditions ===
Highest Race Temperatures; Races with air temperature equaling or exceeding 90°F (32°C)
Year	Degrees		Race Winner	Notes
Year	°F	°C	Race Winner	Notes
1937	92°	33°	(United States) Wilbur Shaw	
1953	91°	33°	(United States) Bill Vukovich	With anecdotal, "unofficial" testimony placing air temperature at the track itself during the race near, at or exceeding 100 °F / 38 °C, potentially the hottest race in history, with at least one fatality, (United States) Carl Scarborough, due to heat illness
1919	91°	33°	(United States) Howdy Wilcox	
2012	91°	33°	(United Kingdom) Dario Franchitti	Reports at the track claimed temperature of 93 °F / 34 °C
2018	91°	33°	(Australia) Will Power	
1978	90°	32°	(United States) Al Unser	
1977	90°	32°	(United States) A. J. Foyt	

Lowest Race Temperatures; Races with highest air temperature not exceeding 65°F (18°C)
Year	Degrees		Race Winner	Notes
Year	°F	°C	Race Winner	Notes
1992	58°	14°	(United States) Al Unser Jr.	51 °F / 11 °C, lowest air temperature at start of race; 38 °F / 3 °C, coldest recorded wind chill during race
1997	60°	16°	(Netherlands) Arie Luyendyk	
1930	62°	17°	(United States) Billy Arnold	
1947	63°	17°	(United States) Mauri Rose	37 °F / 3 °C, lowest air temperature on race morning; 50 °F / 10 °C, lowest average air temperature throughout race day
2025	63°	17°	(Spain) Álex Palou	
1915	65°	18°	(United States) Ralph DePalma	56 °F lowest air temperature on race morning; 58 °F air temperature at start of race
2003	65°	18°	(Brazil) Gil de Ferran	
1924	65°	18°	(United States) Lora L. Corum	
1924	65°	18°	(United States) Joe Boyer	

Rain-shortened races
Year	Laps	Distance		Race Winner
Year	Laps	(miles)	(km)	Race Winner
1926	160	400.000	673.738	(United States) Frank Lockhart
1950	138	345.000	555.224	(United States) Johnnie Parsons
1973	133	332.500	535.107	(United States) Gordon Johncock
1975	174	435.000	700.065	(United States) Bobby Unser
1976	102	255.000	410.383	(United States) Johnny Rutherford
2004	180	450.000	724.205	(United States) Buddy Rice
2007	166	415.000	667.878	(United Kingdom) Dario Franchitti

== Distance records ==
Career Furthest Distance Competed; Thirteen drivers have completed at least three thousand laps, or seven thousand five hundred miles, in race competition.
Rank	Driver	Laps	Miles	Starts	Race; Victories			
1	(Brazil) Hélio Castroneves	4,992	12,480.0	26	2001	2002	2009	2021
2	(United States) A. J. Foyt	4,909	12,272.5	35	1961	1964	1967	1977
3	(New Zealand) Scott Dixon	4,466	11,165.0	24	2008			
4	(United States) Al Unser	4,356	10,890.0	27	1970	1971	1978	1987
5	(United States) Ed Carpenter	4,016	10,040.0	23	None			
6	(Brazil) Tony Kanaan	3,951	9,877.5	22	2013			
7	(United States) Marco Andretti	3,517	8,792.5	20	None			
8	(Australia) Will Power	3,488	8,720.0	19	2018			
9	(United States) Al Unser Jr.	3,173	7,932.5	19	1992	1994		
10	(United States) Gordon Johncock	3,158	7,895.0	24	1973	1982		
11	(United States) Mario Andretti	3,040	7,600.0	29	1969			
12	(United States) Graham Rahal	3,016	7,540.0	18	None			
13	(United States) Buddy Lazier	3,015	7,537.5	20	1996			

=== Most years completing the full 500 miles ===
- 19 Hélio Castroneves (2001, 2002, 2003, 2005, 2008, 2009, 2010, 2012, 2013, 2014, 2015, 2016, 2017, 2020, 2021, 2022, 2023, 2024, 2025)

=== Most consecutive years completing the full 500 miles ===
- 7 Scott Dixon (2018–2024)

=== Most consecutive laps completed ===
- 1,597 Scott Dixon (from the start of the 2018 race through the end of the 2025 race, sans three laps down)

== Interval average speed records ==
Laps	Distance (miles)	Driver	Team	Time*	Average Speed (mph)	Year
1	2.5	(Brazil) Tony Kanaan	Andretti-Green Racing	0:00:41.3359	217.728	2007
2	5	(United States) Tony Stewart	Team Menard	0:01:21.0940	221.965	1996
4	10	(Brazil) Hélio Castroneves	Penske Racing	0:02:43.7710	219.819	2003
10	25	(Brazil) Tony Kanaan	Andretti-Green Racing	0:06:45.7841	221.703	2005
20	50	(Brazil) Bruno Junqueira	Chip Ganassi Racing	0:13:36.0110	220.585	2002
30	75	(United States) JR Hildebrand	Ed Carpenter Racing	0:20:34.6615	218.683	2017
40	100	(Spain) Fernando Alonso	McLaren Honda Andretti	0:27:55.7591	214.828	2017
50	125	(Spain) Fernando Alonso	McLaren Honda Andretti	0:34:43.4310	215.990	2017
60	150	(Spain) Álex Palou	Chip Ganassi Racing	0:41:57.8042	214.473	2023
70	175	(Mexico) Pato O'Ward	Arrow McLaren	0:49:23.6891	212.573	2023
80	200	(Sweden) Felix Rosenqvist	Arrow McLaren	0:56:17.1877	213.195	2023
90	225	(Sweden) Felix Rosenqvist	Arrow McLaren	1:03:12.7220	213.567	2023
100	250	(United States) Ryan Hunter-Reay	Andretti Autosport	1:10:47.8745	211.871	2014
110	275	(Brazil) Hélio Castroneves	Penske Racing	1:17:37.1795	212.575	2014
120	300	(United States) Ryan Hunter-Reay	Andretti Autosport	1:24:24.0448	213.268	2014
130	325	(Colombia) Juan Pablo Montoya	Penske Racing	1:31:17.6531	213.595	2014
140	350	(United States) Marco Andretti	Andretti Autosport	1:38:42.8021	212.737	2014
150	375	(United States) Marco Andretti	Andretti Autosport	1:45:51.7817	212.539	2014
160	400	(United States) Ryan Hunter-Reay	Andretti Autosport	1:58:29.5150	202.543	2014
170	425	(United States) Ryan Hunter-Reay	Andretti Autosport	2:06:41.8255	201.267	2014
180	450	(United States) Ryan Hunter-Reay	Andretti Autosport	2:19:25.5761	193.651	2023
190	475	(United States) Ryan Hunter-Reay	Andretti Autosport	2:28:09.0275	192.372	2013
200	500	(Brazil) Hélio Castroneves	Meyer Shank Racing	2:37:19.4043	190.690	2021
* With official timing and scoring first recording ten-thousandth-second intervals in 2004, years previous assigned zero as decimal placeholder.

== Related lists ==
=== Drivers who crashed while leading during final one hundred miles of race (Lap 160+) ===
- 1931: Billy Arnold - Arnold charged from 18th starting position to lead the race by lap 7. Arnold, who had dominated the 1930 race (led 198 laps), proceeded to lead the next 155 laps, and built up a five-lap lead over second place. His rear axle broke on lap 162. He spun in turn four, was hit by another car, and went over the outside wall. One of his errant wheels bounced across Georgetown Road, and struck and killed a 12-year-old boy, Wilbur C. Brink. Arnold suffered a broken pelvis, and his riding mechanic, Spider Matlock, broke his shoulder.
- 1952: Bill Vukovich - Vukovich led 150 laps, and was leading on lap 192 when a steering linkage failed. Vukovich nursed his car to a stop by driving up against the outside wall at the end of the back straightaway at the beginning of turn three, preventing other drivers from getting involved in the incident.
- 1989: Al Unser Jr. - On the 199th lap, Al Unser Jr. was leading Fittipaldi down the backstretch. The two cars weaving through lap traffic, and Fittipaldi dove underneath Unser exiting turn two. Racing side-with Unser drawing back ahead by a nose entering turn three, the two cars touched wheels, and Unser spun out, crashing into the outside wall. Fittipaldi coasted around the final lap under caution to score his first race victory.
- 1994: Emerson Fittipaldi - while leading the race on lap 184, Fittipaldi was attempting to lap his teammate Al Unser Jr., who was running second. Coming out of turn four, Fittipaldi's left wheels touched the rumble strips on the inside, causing the left side tires to lose adhesion, and the rear of the car to swing wide at the turn exit, resulting in the rear tagging the outside wall and knocking Fittipaldi out of the race. Unser Jr. went on to win.
- 2002: Tomas Scheckter - After leading 85 laps during the race, the rookie was leading on lap 173. Coming out of turn 4, he slid high and smacked the outside wall down the frontstretch.
- 2011: J. R. Hildebrand - During the final ten laps, a sequence of green flag pit stops shuffled the field. Rookie J. R. Hildebrand was attempting to stretch his fuel to the finish, and took over the lead with just over two laps to go. On the final lap, he was leading going into the final turn, when he came up on the lapped car of Charlie Kimball, who was slowing to the inside. Hildebrand went high, got into the "marbles," and smacked the outside wall. Without steering, and only on three wheels, his car slid down the frontstretch towards the finish line and the checkered flag. However, Hildebrand was passed by Dan Wheldon on the final 1,000 feet and Hildebrand finished second.
