= Wishart Island (British Columbia) =

Island in British Columbia, Canada

Coordinates: 50°52′44″N 127°29′07″W

Wishart Island is a small islet in the Queen Charlotte Strait region of the Central Coast of British Columbia, Canada, located in the Deserters Group to the west of Deserters Island. Both it and the Wishart Peninsula on Broughton Island are named for a James Wishart, who was one of the crew of the HBC vessel Norman Morrison who deserted that vessel and were killed on these islands by natives sent out to find and capture them.

== See also ==
- Wishart Peninsula
- Wishart (disambiguation)
