= S. F. Brock =

American racing driver (1882–unknown)

- Born: S. Frank Brock circa 1882 New Hampshire, U.S.
- Died: unknown

Champ Car career
- 3 races run over 1 year
- First race: 1914 Indianapolis 500 (Indianapolis)
- Last race: 1914 Montamarathon Trophy (Tacoma)
Wins	Podiums	Poles
0	0	0

S. Frank Brock (c. 1882 – c. 1918 or later) was an American racing driver who participated in the 1914 Indianapolis 500. Brock is believed to have been born in New Hampshire. Brock was believed lost at sea off the coast of England during a World War I naval accident, before later evidence supported his survival and relocation to California after the war.

== Motorsports career results ==
=== Indianapolis 500 results ===
Year	Car	Start	Qual	Rank	Finish	Laps	Led	Retired
1914	48	21	87.830	21	30	5	0	Camshaft
Totals						5	0	

Starts	1
Poles	0
Front Row	0
Wins	0
Top 5	0
Top 10	0
Retired	1
