= Charles Keene (racing driver) =

American racing driver (1881–1963)

- Born: Charles Franklin Keene; March 23, 1881 Ionia, Michigan, U.S.
- Died: December 6, 1963 (aged 82) Orange, California, U.S.

Champ Car career
- 3 races run over 2 years
- First race: 1914 Indianapolis 500 (Indianapolis)
- Last race: 1914 50-mile Race #2 (Galveston)
Wins	Podiums	Poles
0	0	0

Charles Franklin Keene (March 23, 1881 – December 6, 1963) was an American racing driver active during the formative years of auto racing. His car was named the Beaver Bullet.

== Motorsports career results ==
=== Indianapolis 500 results ===
Year	Car	Start	Qual	Rank	Finish	Laps	Led	Retired
1914	5	27	86.870	27	8	200	0	Running

Starts	1
Poles	0
Front Row	0
Wins	0
Top 5	0
Top 10	1
Retired	0
