= Joe Dawson (racing driver) =

American racing driver (1889–1946)

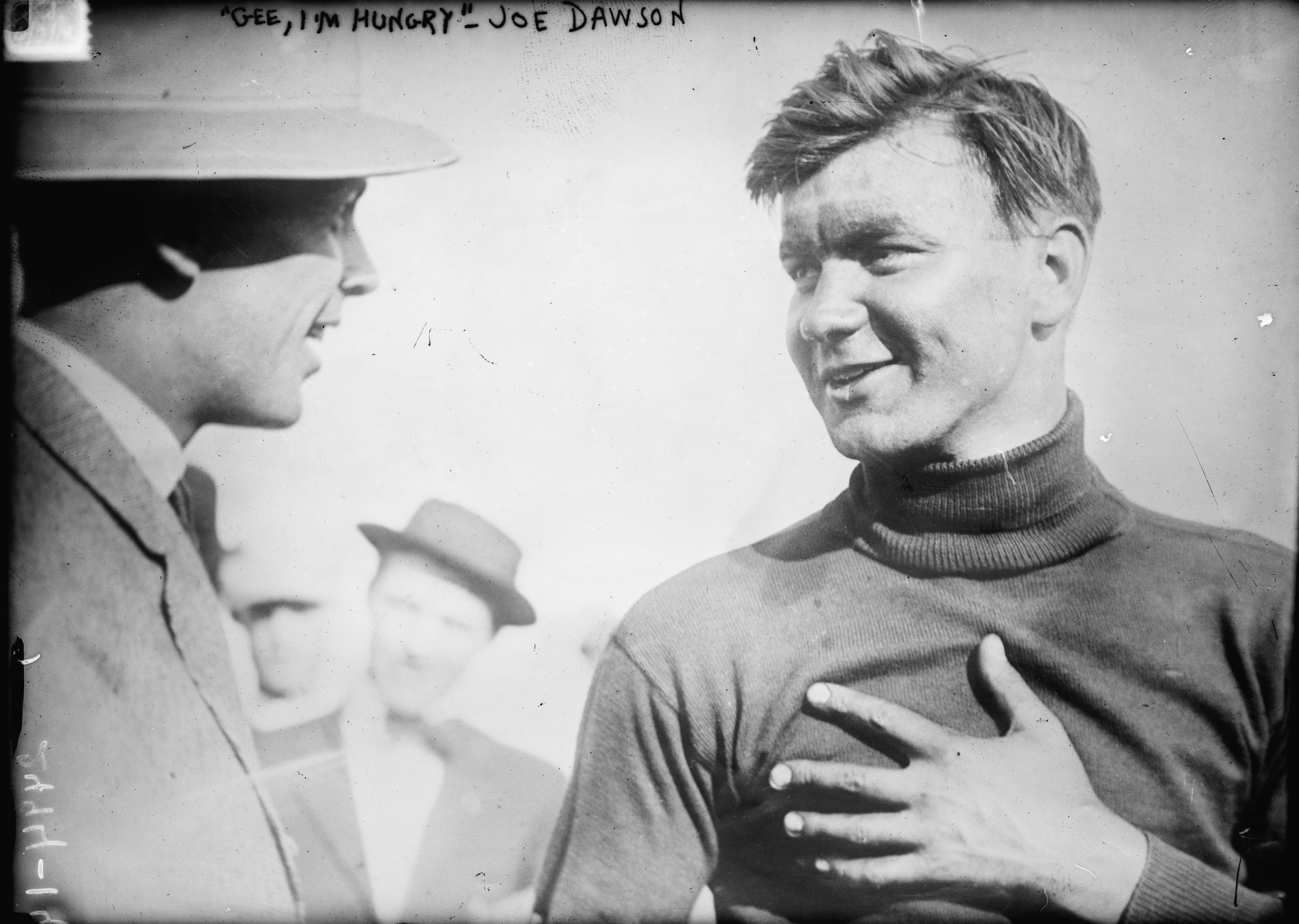
- Dawson after winning the 1912 Indianapolis 500
- Born: Joseph Crooke Dawson; July 17, 1889 Odon, Indiana, U.S.
- Died: June 17, 1946 (aged 56) Bensalem, Pennsylvania, U.S.

Championship titles
- Major victories Indianapolis 500 (1912)

Champ Car career
- 18 races run over 5 years
- First race: 1910 50-mile Race (Atlanta)
- Last race: 1914 Indianapolis 500 (Indianapolis)
- First win: 1910 Cobe Trophy (Indianapolis)
- Last win: 1912 Indianapolis 500 (Indianapolis)
| Wins | Podiums | Poles |
|---|---|---|
| 2 | 9 | 0 |

Joseph Crooke Dawson (July 17, 1889 – June 17, 1946) was an American racing driver. He was the winner of the Indianapolis 500 in 1912.

== Biography ==
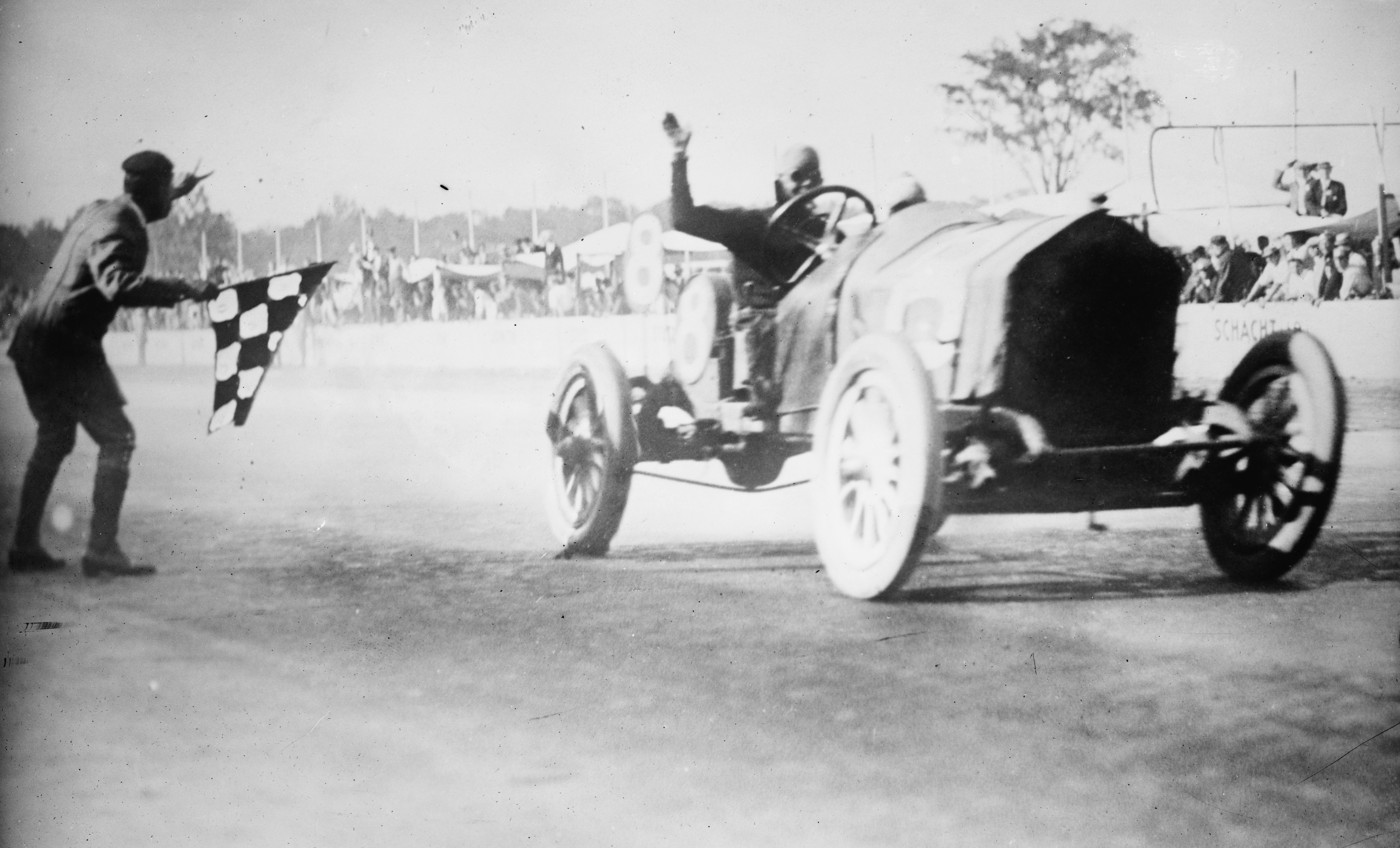
Dawson winning the 1912 Indianapolis 500

Dawson was born in Odon, Indiana on July 17, 1889. Dawson competed in the Indianapolis 500 race three times, beginning in 1911 when he drove a Marmon to a fifth-place finish. The following year, Dawson won after Ralph DePalma, who had led for 196 laps of the 200 lap race, dropped out with a mechanical failure. At age 22 years and 323 days, Dawson was the youngest winner of the "500" until Troy Ruttman won the 1952 Indianapolis 500 at age 22 years and 86 days. In his final Indy 500 race in 1914, Dawson retired after an accident on the 45th lap when avoiding Ray Gilhooley. He died on June 17, 1946, at age 56 in Bensalem, Pennsylvania.

== Motorsports career results ==
=== Indianapolis 500 results ===
| Year | Car | Start | Qual | Rank | Finish | Laps | Led | Retired |
|---|---|---|---|---|---|---|---|---|
| 1911 | 31 | 27 | — | — | 5 | 200 | 0 | Running |
| 1912 | 8 | 7 | 86.130 | 4 | 1 | 200 | 2 | Running |
| 1914 | 26 | 17 | 93.550 | 5 | 25 | 45 | 0 | Crash BS |
| Totals | | | | | | 445 | 2 | |

| Starts | 3 |
| Poles | 0 |
| Front Row | 0 |
| Wins | 1 |
| Top 5 | 2 |
| Top 10 | 2 |
| Retired | 1 |

| Preceded by Ray Harroun | Indianapolis 500 Winner; 1912 | Succeeded by Jules Goux |
