= Mahpahkum Indian Reserve No. 4 =

Coordinates: 50°53′00″N 127°28′00″W

Mahpahkum Indian Reserve No. 4, officially Mahpahkum 4, is an Indian reserve at the northwest end of Deserters Island in the Deserters Group of the Queen Charlotte Strait region of the Central Coast of British Columbia, Canada. It is 7.8 hectares in size and is one of the reserves under the governance of the Gwa'Sala-Nakwaxda'xw band government of the Kwakwaka'wakw peoples.

== See also ==
- List of Indian reserves in British Columbia
