= Philip Braender =

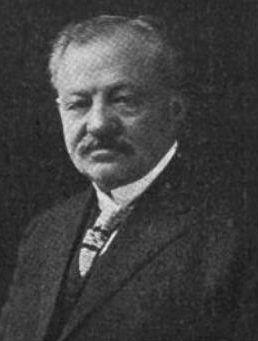
- Born: 1849; Germany
- Died: November 4, 1916 (aged 66–67); White Plains, New York, United States
- Occupation: Businessman

Philip Braender (1849–1916) was a German-born American real estate developer. He started the Braender Bulldog company, which manufactured tires in East Rutherford, New Jersey.

== Biography ==
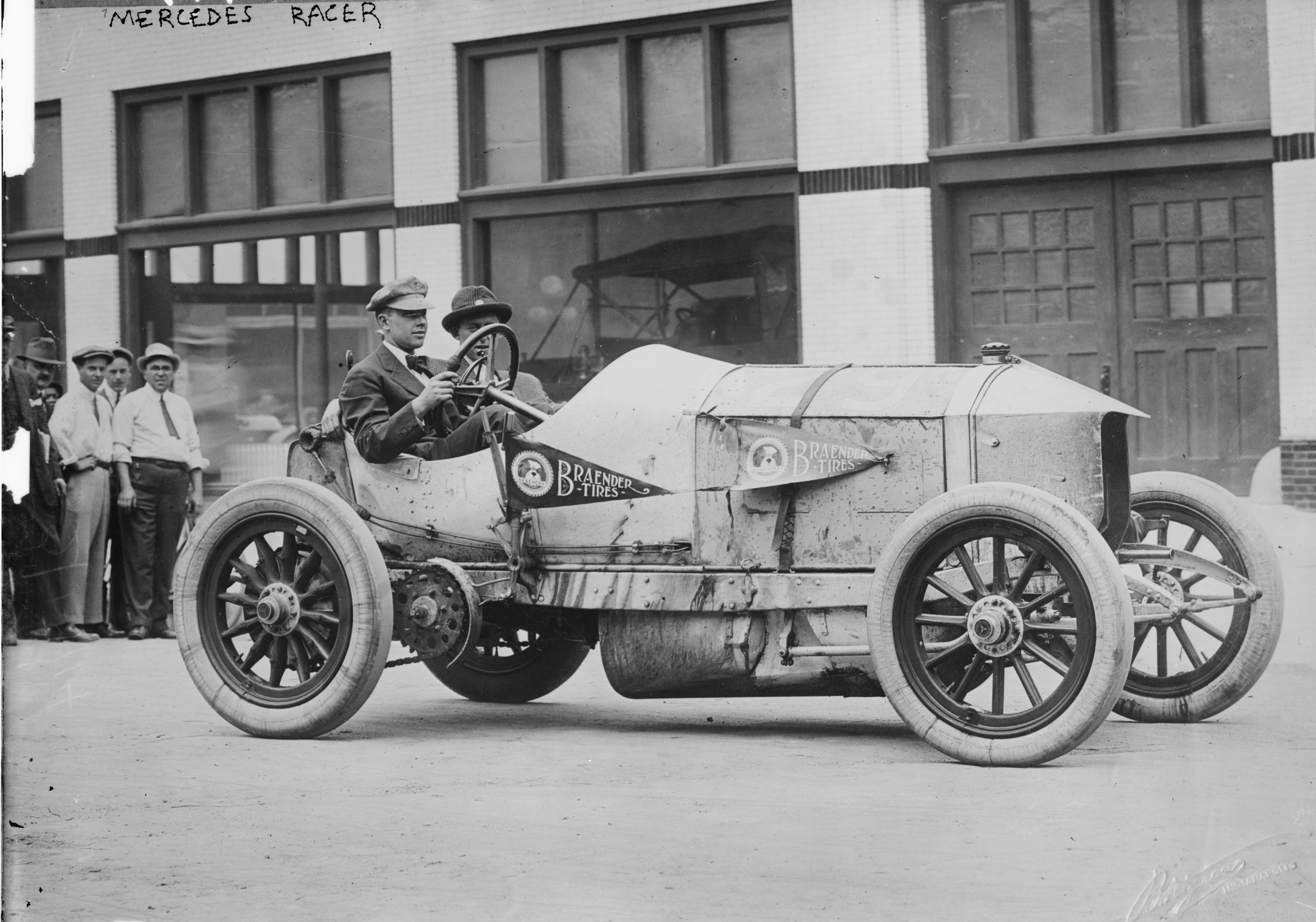
Ralph DePalma in 1914 in Indianapolis in his Mercedes using Braender tires

The Braender circa 1911

Philip Braender was born in 1849 in Germany. He emigrated to the United States around 1865. He started the company in 1912. As a real estate developer, he bought a lot at 418 Central Park West in Manhattan and erected a ten-story apartment building called The Braender. At the time it was erected it was the tallest apartment house on the Manhattan West side.

He started the Braender Bulldog company that manufactured automobile tires, and he sponsored a car in the 1914 Indianapolis 500 but it didn't finish the race.

He died in White Plains, New York on November 4, 1916, and left an estate worth over $1 million.
