= Ray Gilhooley =

American racing driver (1887–1973)

- Born: July 15, 1887 New York, New York, U.S.
- Died: September 18, 1973 (aged 86) New Milford, Connecticut, U.S.

Champ Car career
- 1 race run over 1 year
- First race: 1914 Indianapolis 500 (Indianapolis)
Wins	Podiums	Poles
0	0	0

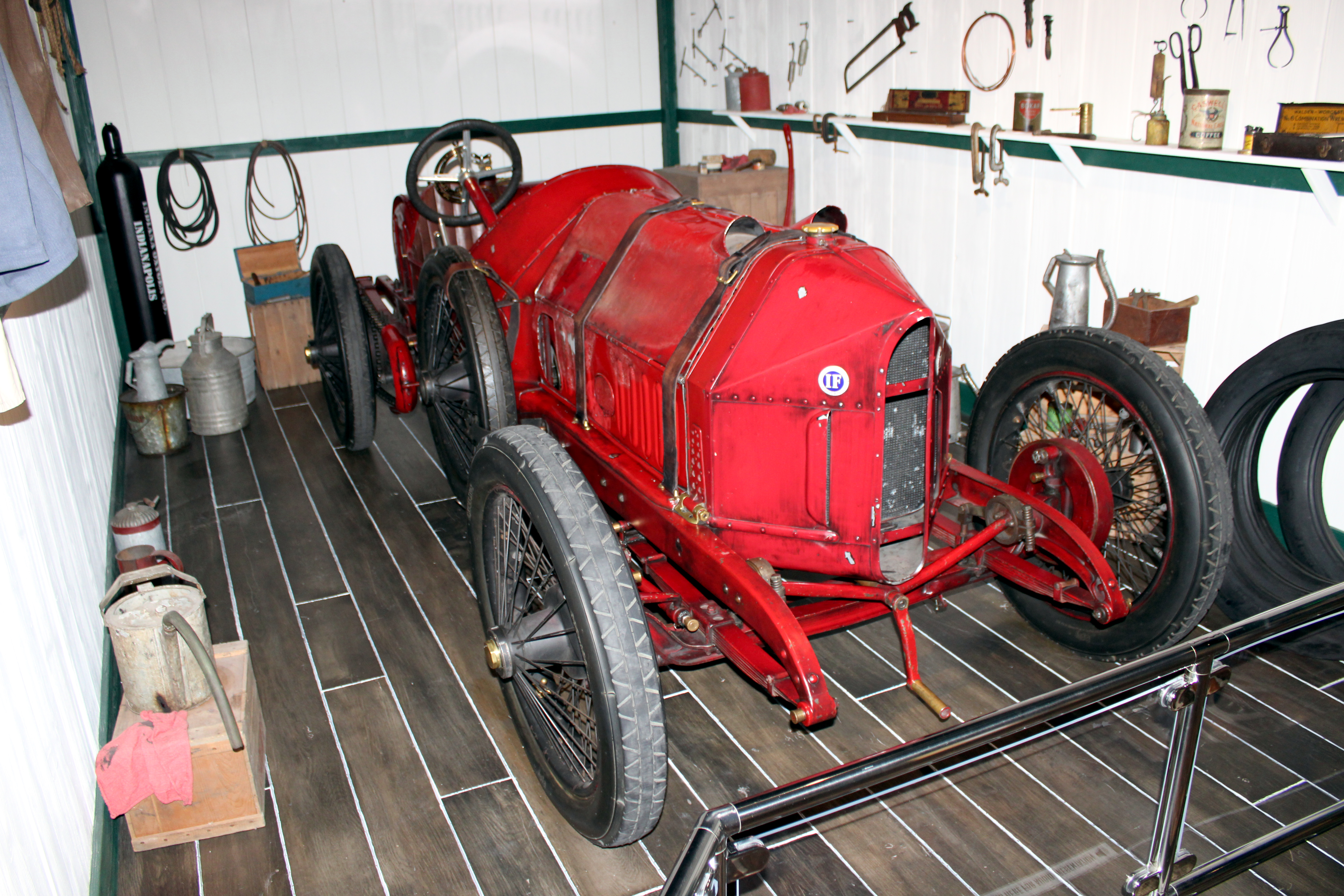
Ray Gilhooley's 1914 Isotta Fraschini Tipo IM on display at the Indianapolis Motor Speedway Museum

Ray Gilhooley (July 15, 1887 – September 18, 1973) was an American racing driver.

== Motorsports career results ==
=== Indianapolis 500 results ===
Year	Car	Start	Qual	Rank	Finish	Laps	Led	Retired
1914	49	20	84.200	30	27	41	0	Crash BS
Totals						41	0	

Starts	1
Poles	0
Front Row	0
Wins	0
Top 5	0
Top 10	0
Retired	1
