= Deserters Island =

Island in British Columbia, Canada

Coordinates: 50°52′34″N 127°28′10″W

Deserters Island is an island in the Deserters Group archipelago in the Queen Charlotte Strait region of the Central Coast of British Columbia, Canada. Mahpahkum Indian Reserve No. 4 is at its northwest end.

Its name refers to the crew of the HBC vessel Norman Morrison who deserted their vessel and were killed there by natives sent to find and capture them. Wishart Island in this group, and the Wishart Peninsula on Broughton Island, are named for James Wishart, one of the deserters. A group of rocks in the middle of the strait to the northeast of the Deserters Group is named for A. Willoughby, another member of the group.

== See also ==
- Deserter (disambiguation)
