= Shawl Bay =

Bay and locality on the west side of the Wishart Peninsula

Shawl Bay, British Columbia, Canada, is a bay and locality on the west side of the Wishart Peninsula, which is to the east of Broughton Island, in the Inside Passage between Vancouver Island and the British Columbia mainland near the entrance to Kingcome Inlet. The bay is located between the Wishart Peninsula to the east and Gregory Island to the west; the locality is located on the east side of the bay on a small isthmus at 50°51′20″N 126°33′20″W which forms the Wishart Peninsula. It can be approached from Penphrase Passage from the east, or Sutlej Channel from the west. There is a commercial marina at this location serving pleasure boaters.

== See also ==
- List of settlements in British Columbia
