= George Mason (racing driver) =

American racing driver (1890–1918)

- Born: George Rider Mason; May 6, 1890 Des Moines, Iowa, U.S.
- Died: September 13, 1918 (aged 28) Hombleux, Somme, France

Champ Car career
- 9 races run over 3 years
- First race: 1912 Wisconsin Challenge Trophy (Wauwatosa)
- Last race: 1917 Chicago 100 (Speedway Park)
Wins	Podiums	Poles
0	1	0

George Rider Mason (May 6, 1890 – September 13, 1918) was an American racing driver. A Red Cross ambulance driver in World War I, Mason was killed in action, or as the result of pneumonia.

Mason has the distinction of being the first and, until Greg Ray in the 2003 race, only driver to field a car in the Indianapolis 500 carrying the number 13 over the first 86 years of the event. From 1926–2002, usage of No. 13 was not permitted, and generally avoided by competitors due to superstitions.

== Motorsports career results ==
=== Indianapolis 500 results ===
Year	Car	Start	Qual	Rank	Finish	Laps	Led	Retired
1914	13	13	87.100	25	23	66	0	Piston
Totals						66	0	

Starts	1
Poles	0
Front Row	0
Wins	0
Top 5	0
Top 10	0
Retired	1
