= Hugh Wishart =

American silversmith

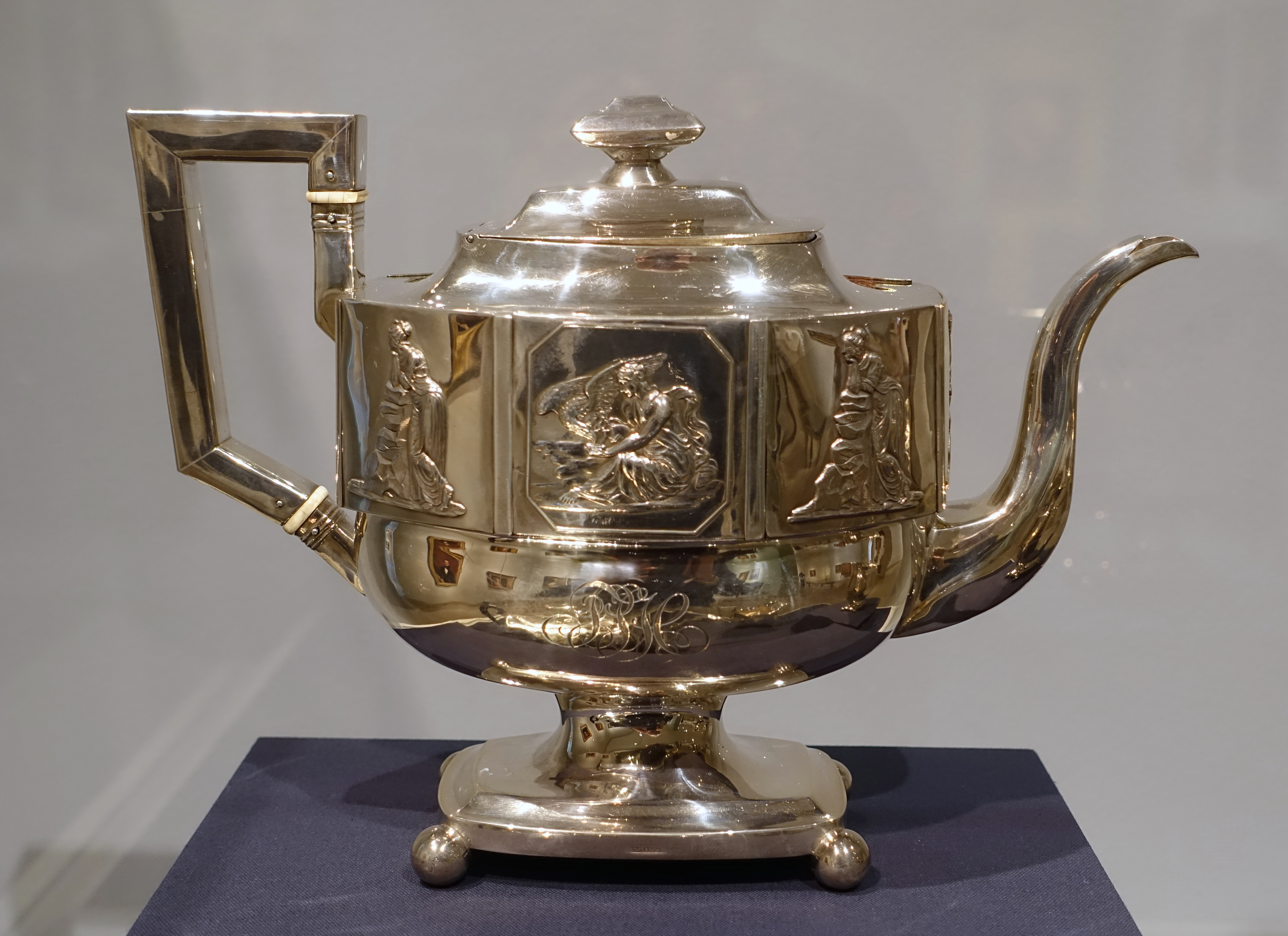
Teapot by Hugh Wishart, c. 1815

Hugh Wishart was an American silversmith, active in New York City from 1793-1824. He had shops at 62 Wall Street, 98 Market Street, 319 Pearl Street (1797), 5 Rector Street (1808), and 66 Maiden Lane (1810). In 1806 he served as a fireman in Company 16. His work is collected in the Art Institute of Chicago, Dallas Museum of Art, Metropolitan Museum of Art, and Nelson-Atkins Museum of Art.
