= John Wishart =

John Wishart may refer to:

- John Wishart (bishop) (died 1338), bishop of Glasgow
- John Wishart of Pitarrow (d. 1576), Scottish lawyer and politician
- John Wishart (surgeon) (1850–1926), Canadian surgeon
- John Wishart (statistician) (1898–1956), Scottish statistician
- John Henry Wishart (1781–1834), Scottish ophthalmic surgeon
