= William Wishart (disambiguation) =

William Wishart may refer to:

- William Wishart, 13th century Scottish bishop of St Andrews
- William Wishart (primus), University of Edinburgh principal 1716-1730
- William Wishart (secundus), University of Edinburgh principal 1736-1754
- William Wishart Biddle, an American psychologist
