= Wishart, Virginia =

Unincorporated community in Virginia, United States

Coordinates: 37°53′02″N 75°29′40″W

Wishart is an unincorporated community in Accomack County, Virginia, United States.
