= Wishart Peninsula =

Peninsula in British Columbia, Canada

Coordinates: 50°50′22″N 126°31′55″W

The Wishart Peninsula is a peninsula on the Coast of British Columbia, located east of Broughton Island to the south of Wakeman Sound.

== Name origin ==
The peninsula and Wishart Island (British Columbia) in the Deserters Group are named for a James Wishart, who was one of the crew of the HBC vessel Norman Morrison who deserted that vessel and were killed on the Deserters Group islands by natives sent out to find and capture them.

== See also ==
- Shawl Bay
- Wishart Island
- Wishart (disambiguation)
