= Ian Wishart =

Ian Wishart may refer to:

- Ian Wishart (cricketer) (born 1948), former English cricketer
- Ian Wishart (journalist) (born 1964), New Zealand journalist
- Ian Wishart (politician) (born c. 1954), Canadian politician
