= René Thomas (racing driver) =

French racing driver (1886–1975)

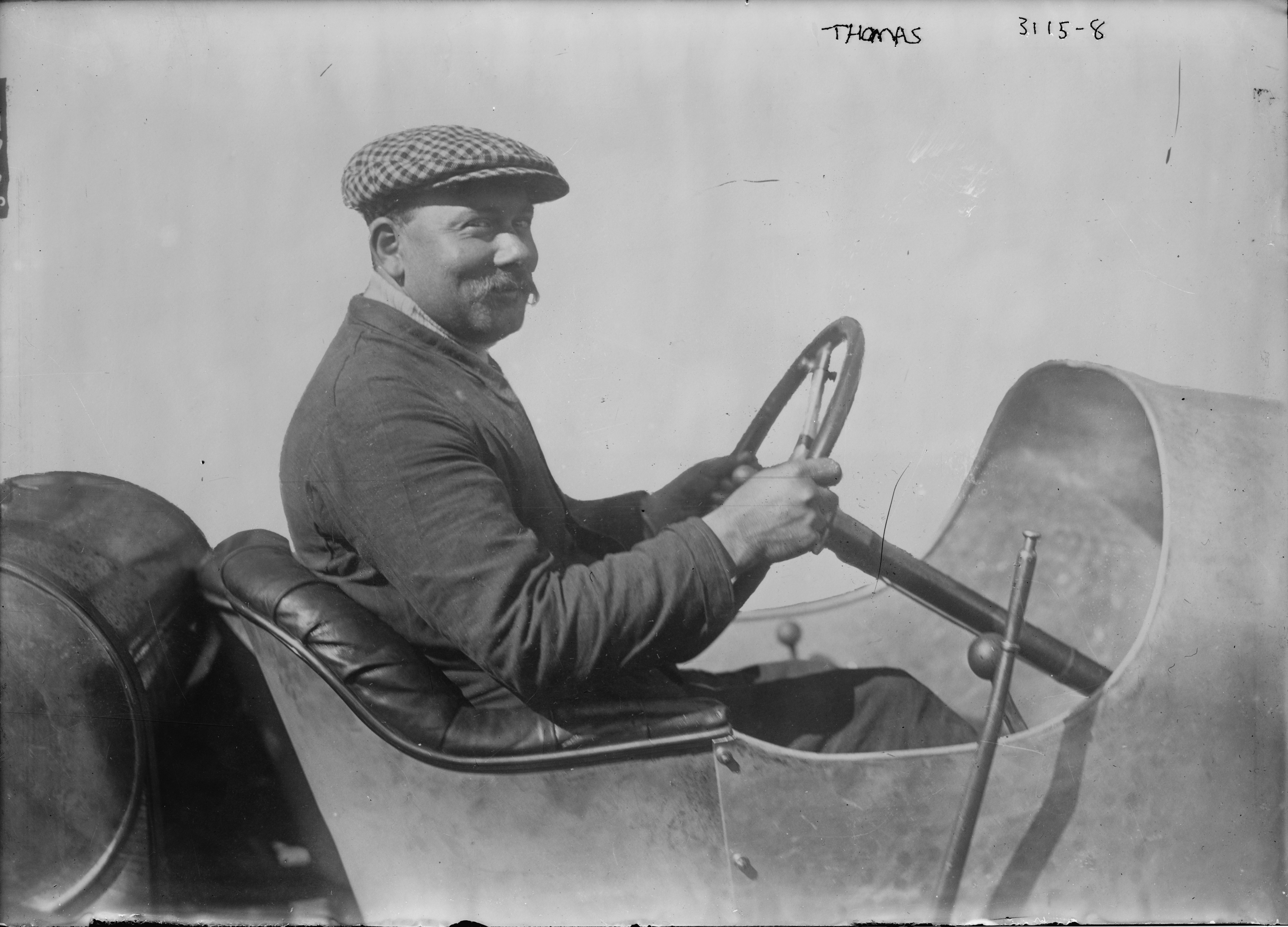
- Thomas at the 1914 Indianapolis 500
- Born: René Alfred Thomas; 7 March 1886 Périgueux, Dordogne, France
- Died: 23 September 1975 (aged 89) Colombes, Hauts-de-Seine, France

Championship titles
- Major victories Indianapolis 500 (1914)

Champ Car career
- 4 races run over 4 years
- Best finish: 6th (1920)
- First race: 1914 Indianapolis 500 (Indianapolis)
- Last race: 1921 Indianapolis 500 (Indianapolis)
- First win: 1914 Indianapolis 500 (Indianapolis)
Wins	Podiums	Poles
1	2	1

René Alfred Thomas (7 March 1886 – 23 September 1975) was a French racing driver. Thomas was also a pioneer aviator. He won the 1914 Indianapolis 500.

== Biography ==
Thomas was born on 7 March 1886 in Périgueux, France.

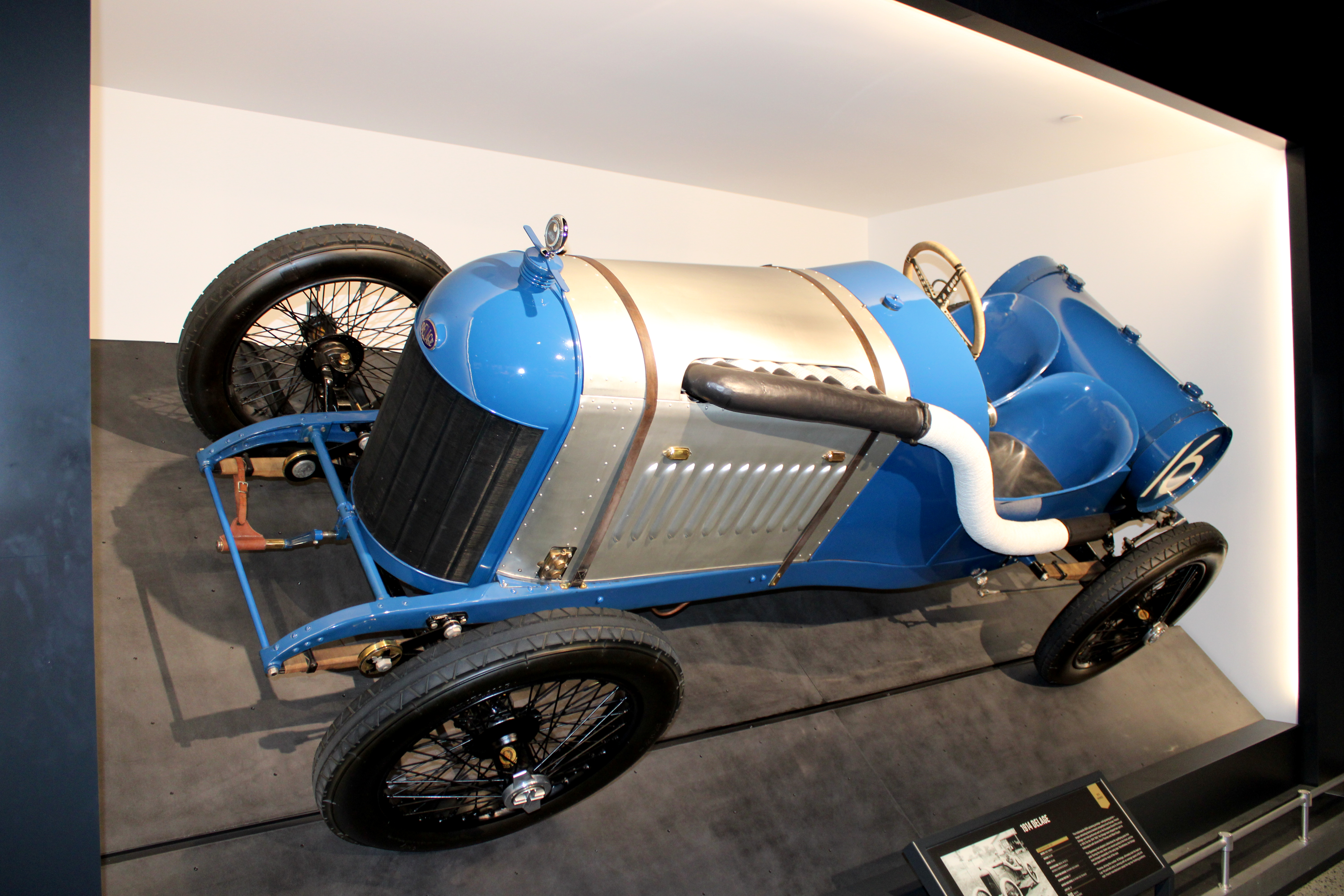
Thomas's winning car from the 1914 Indianapolis 500

A leading driver in his native France, Thomas traveled to the United States to compete in the Indianapolis 500 on four occasions. He won the 1914 Indianapolis 500 on his inaugural try driving a Delage.

Thomas was given leave from the French Army during World War I so he could continue to race, but could not join the 1915 race after failing to secure a Delage and did not join the 1916 race he also intended to.

Laminated spring steel steering wheels were manufactured in the inter-war period engraved with Thomas's portrait and signature and were used particularly on Delage motorcars, but also by racing driver Jean Chassagne on his winning 1922 TT Sunbeam.

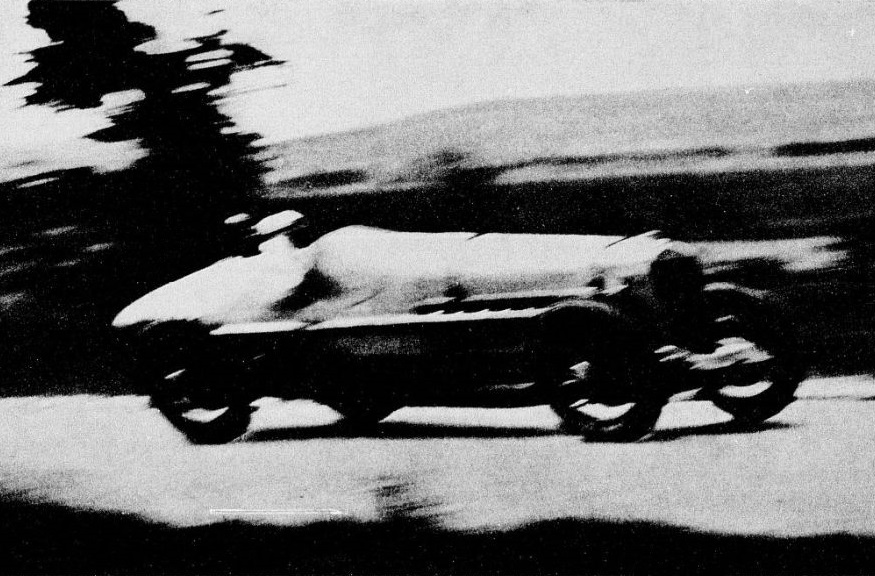
Thomas, during his land speed record run

On 6 July 1924 at Arpajon, France, Thomas set a new world land speed record when he drove a Delage at 143.31 mph (230.64 km/h).

On 28 May 1973, Thomas returned to Indianapolis to drive his winning Delage in a series of parade laps, prior to the start of the 1973 Indianapolis 500. Although he did not drive the car himself, he did sit in the seat where the riding mechanic would sit.

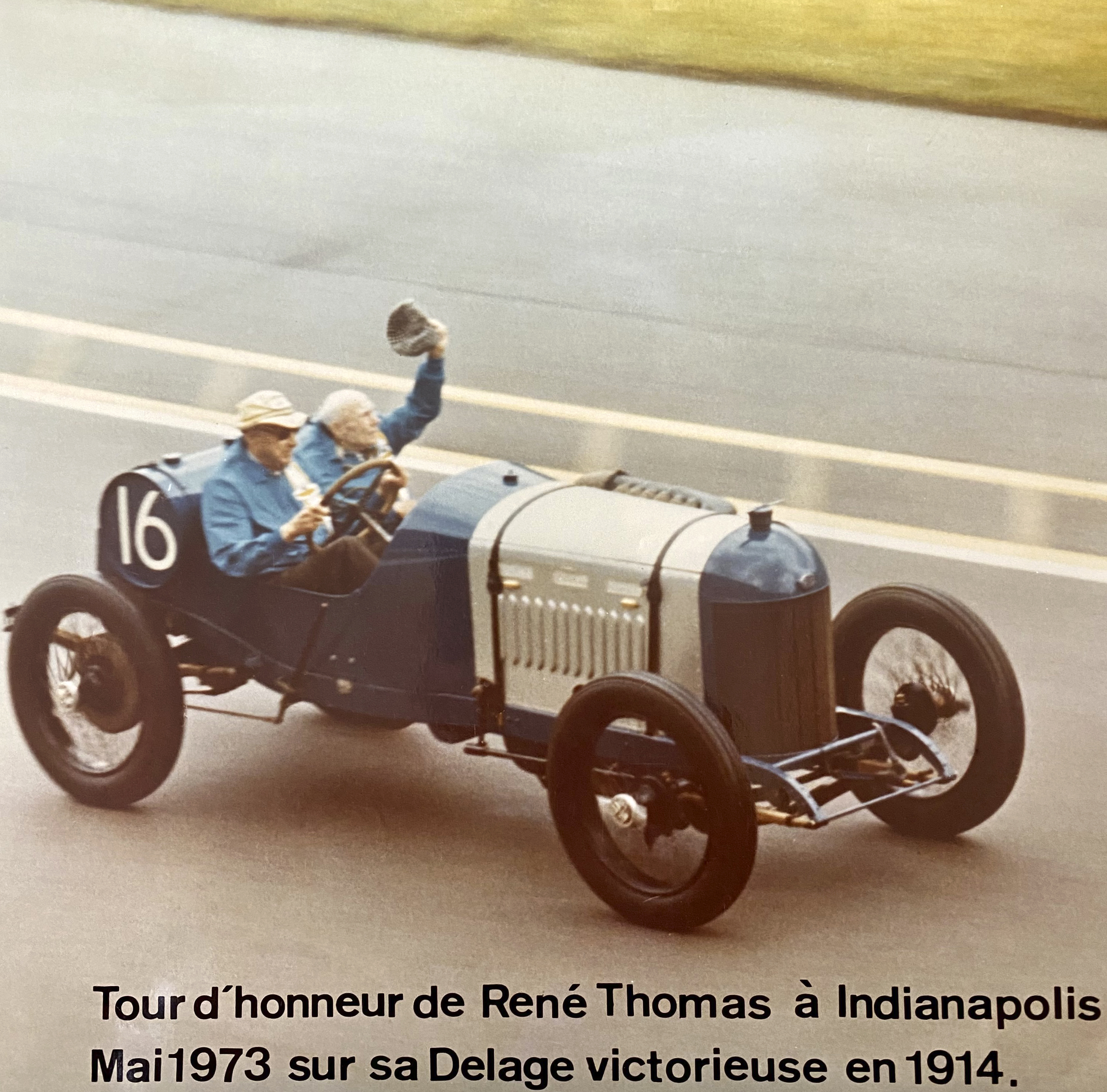
Thomas, taking a ceremonial lap ahead of the 1973 Indianapolis 500

Thomas died on 23 September 1975 in Paris, France, at age 89.

== Aviation ==
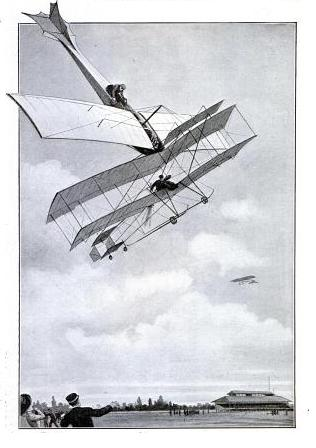
Artist's impression of the collision - Thomas was above

Beginning around 1910 Thomas flew airplanes for the Antoinette company whose president was Leon Levavasseur. Hubert Latham was one of Thomas's fellow Antoinette test pilots. Thomas competed in early aviation competitions throughout Europe. In Milan, Italy in October 1910 Thomas was involved in the world's first mid-air collision when his Antoinette monoplane fell onto the Farman biplane of Scottish aviator Captain Bertram Dickson. Thomas miraculously was not seriously injured but Dickson suffered internal injuries and never fully recovered, eventually dying in 1913.

During World War I, Thomas initially served as a pilot, but was wounded in action and released.

== Motorsports career results ==
=== Indianapolis 500 results ===
Year	Car	Start	Qual	Rank	Finish	Laps	Led	Retired
1914	16	15	94.540	4	1	200	102	Running
1919	31	1	104.700	1	11	200	0	Running
1920	25	18	93.950	5	2	200	12	Running
1921	15	17	83.750	21	10	144	0	Water hose
Totals						744	114	

Starts	4
Poles	1
Front Row	1
Wins	1
Top 5	2
Top 10	3
Retired	1

Preceded by Jules Goux	Indianapolis 500 Winner; 1914	Succeeded by Ralph DePalma
