= 1914 Indianapolis 500 =

American motor race

4th Indianapolis 500
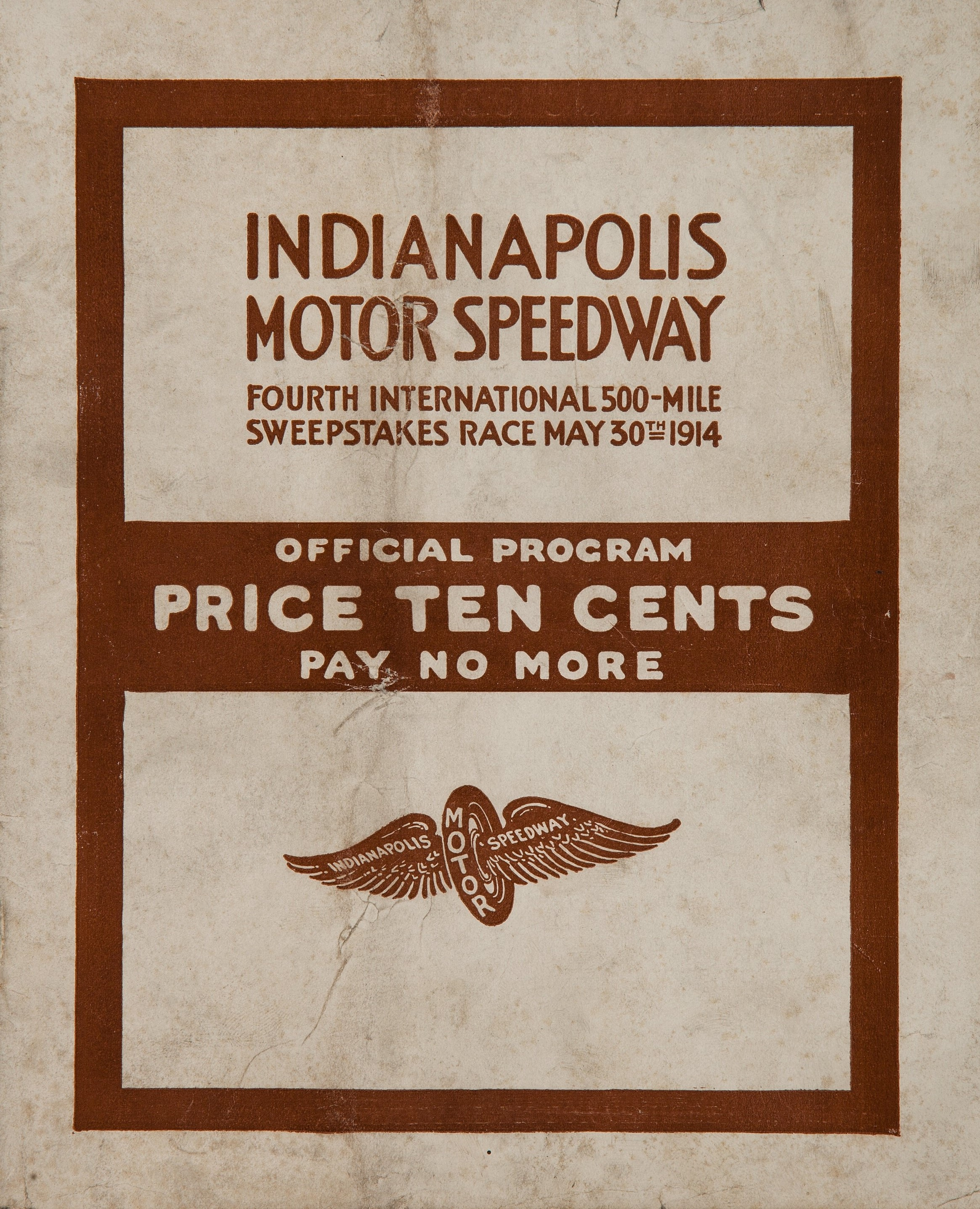

Indianapolis Motor Speedway

Indianapolis 500
- Sanctioning body: AAA
- Date: May 30, 1914
- Winner: René Thomas
- Winning Riding Mechanic: Robert Laly
- Winning Entrant: Delage
- Winning time: 6:03:46
- Average speed: 82.474 mph (132.729 km/h)
- Pole position: Jean Chassagne
- Pole speed: Grid set by blind draw
- Most laps led: René Thomas (102)

Pre-race
- Pace car: Stoddard-Dayton
- Pace car driver: Carl G. Fisher
- Starter: Thomas J. Hay
- Honorary referee: John A. Wilson
- Estimated attendance: 110,000

Chronology
Previous	Next
1913	1915

The 4th International 500-Mile Sweepstakes Race was held at the Indianapolis Motor Speedway on Saturday, May 30, 1914.

René Thomas was the race winner, accompanied by riding mechanic Robert Laly.

== Background ==
=== Race history ===
The Indianapolis Motor Speedway opened in 1909, and the first motorsport event at the track, a series of motorcycle races, was held in August of that year. A series of automobile races were held in 1909, but concerns were raised about the condition of the course after numerous accidents, including a fatality. The track was re-paved at a high-cost to Carl G. Fisher and the Indianapolis Motor Speedway Corporation, and further series of races took place in 1910. Fisher was worried about the dwindling attendances at these races, and decided to establish a 500-mile race; double the furthest distance of any previous race at the track. He went on to announce that the track would host no other races during the year, and that the prize for first place would be $25,000: more than 10 times higher than any other race. The total prize-fund was $85,000. Fisher's plans paid off, and at the 1911 Indianapolis 500, the inaugural event, newspapers reported that in excess of 80,000 people attended the race. Each of the first two races were won by Americans; Ray Harroun in 1911 and Joe Dawson in 1912. In 1913, the large prize-fund attracted European teams and racers, and the race was won by Jules Goux in a Peugeot.

=== Rule changes ===
During the 1913 race, Jules Goux and his riding mechanic had drunk 4/5 of an American pint of champagne (2/3 of an Imperial pint or 19/50 of a liter), during each of his pit stops. For 1914, the consumption of alcohol during the race was banned. Riding mechanics were mandatory for the 1914 race. The maximum engine size remained unchanged at 450 cubic inches (7,400 cc) of engine displacement.

== Report ==
=== Elimination trials ===
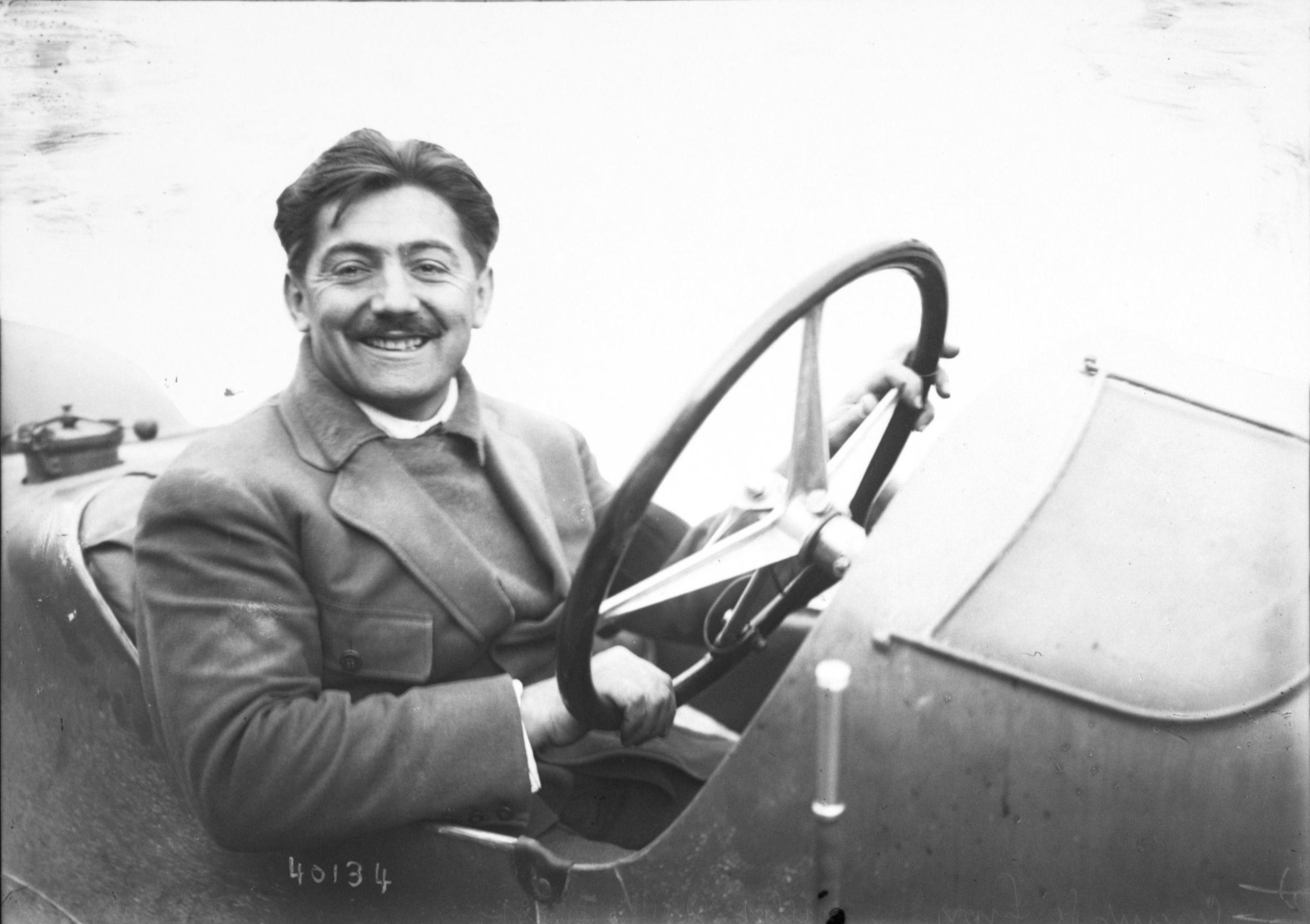
Georges Boillot set the fastest time during the elimination trials, exceeding 125 miles per hour (201 km/h) along the straights.

There were 45 entrants for the race, but only the quickest 30 drivers during the elimination trials would qualify for the race. The first day of trials was completed on the Monday before the race, May 25. Caleb Bragg set the fastest official time on the first day, recording 1:36.8, though it was reckoned that Howdy Wilcox went quicker, but his time was not officially recorded. Ralph DePalma, a crowd favorite, struggled in his Mercedes and could only manage a time of 1:47.4, slower than the 1:45 that it was predicted drivers would have to beat in order to qualify. Only fifteen of the drivers ran on the first day, and they continued with two sessions on Tuesday. On the second day, three drivers set record times around the Speedway: first the 1912 winner, Joe Dawson, set an unofficial lap time of 1:34.8. Later in the day Teddy Tetzlaff completed a lap in 1:33.4, while Jules Goux finished the day as the fastest driver, with a time of 1:31.7. Tetzlaff's lap was completed in a Maxwell which was fuelled with a 50:50 mix of gasoline and kerosene; the other Maxwell, driven by Billy Carlson, set a time of 1:36.6 fuelled by a combination of kerosene and lubricating oil, with no gasoline. Ray Harroun, who had won the inaugural Indianapolis 500 in 1911, designed the Maxwell car, and was given $10,000 (equivalent to $321,000 in 2025) by the company's president as a reward for the cars qualifying with sub-1:37 times.

By the end of the second day, 21 drivers had completed speed trials, and all but DePalma and Eddie Pullen had times below 1:45. Hughie Hughes's car suffered a broken crank case, preventing him from being able to set a qualifying time. On the final day of the trials, DePalma managed to make significant improvements in his Mercedes, and qualified with the twentieth fastest time overall, in 1:42.12. Georges Boillot set the overall fastest time, edging out his teammate Goux by completing a lap in 1:30.13, exceeding 125 miles per hour (201 km/h) along the straights. The slowest of the thirty qualifiers was Harry Grant in a Sunbeam, with a lap time of 1:44.09.

=== Build up ===
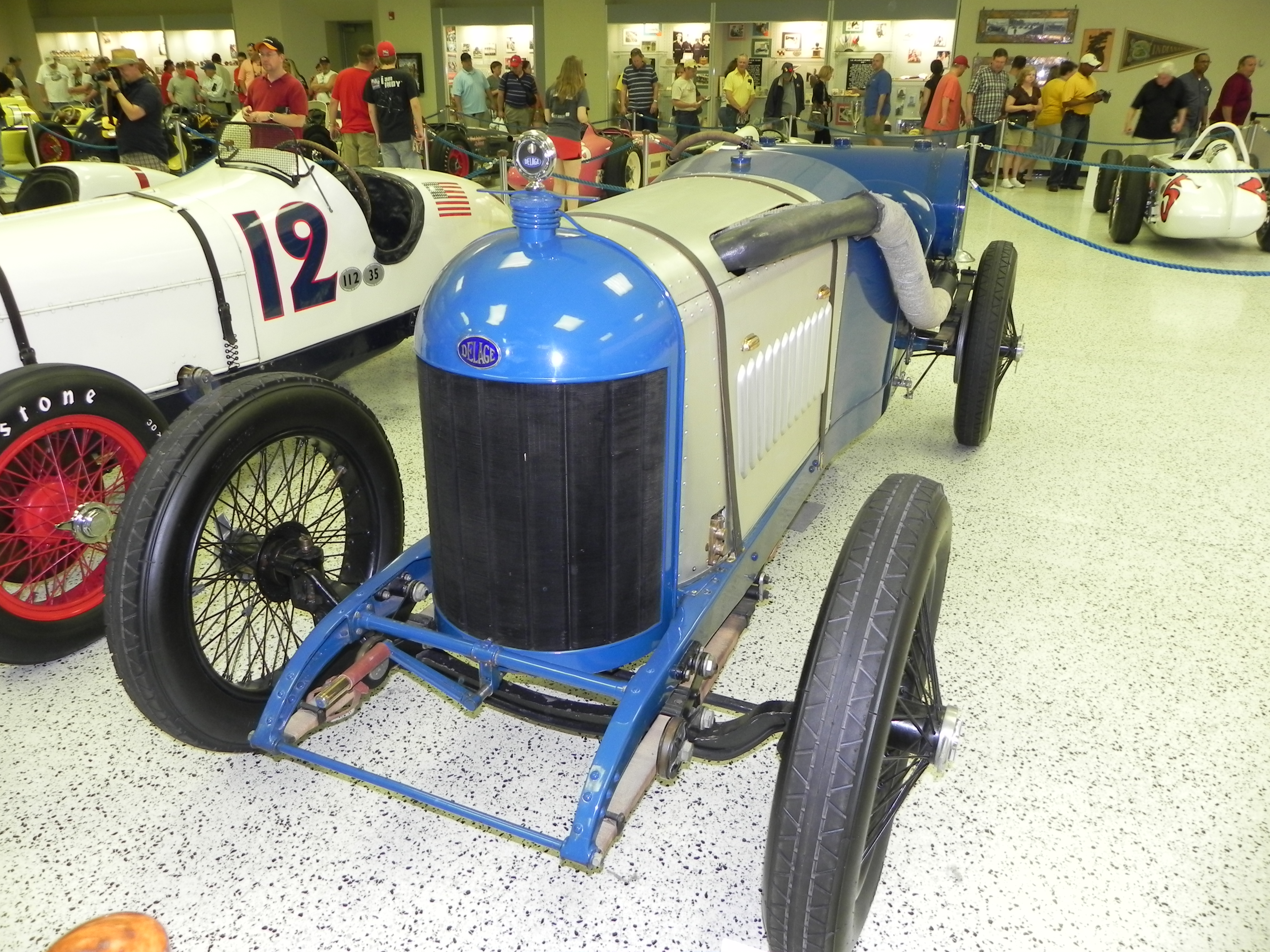
The 1914 winning car, now located at the Indianapolis Motor Speedway Hall of Fame and Museum

After the rigors of the elimination trials, DePalma withdrew from the race, claiming that his car had been vibrating so heavily that his engine would not survive the race. His place was taken by Ray Gilhooley in the Italian-built Isotta car. Gilhooley was known as a fearless, and sometimes erratic, driver who was feared by his peers, as they considered him unpredictable. DePalma claimed that he had twice seen Gilhooley "tear through a wooden fence at full tilt" on occasions when Gilhooley risked overtakes on dangerous corners. The bookmakers made the 1913 race winner, Goux, the favorite, followed by his Peugeot teammate Boillot. Although the Frenchmen were accepted to be driving the quickest cars, there was some belief in the American press that their English tires might not be as durable as American tires, which could improve the chances of the American drivers.

=== Race ===
The starting lineup for the race was determined by random draw the night before the race amongst the qualified drivers. Frenchman Jean Chassagne drew pole position, while Teddy Tetzlaff and Howdy Wilcox completed the front row. Wilcox led the first lap of the race, but the European drivers dominated the day, with five of the top six finishing positions going to them. René Thomas, driving a French-made Delage, led 102 laps en route to victory, setting a new record average speed of 82.47 mph (132.72 km/h). Belgian Arthur Duray finished second after leading 77 laps, roughly 6 minutes 38 seconds behind Thomas. Barney Oldfield finished as the highest place American in fifth placed.

== Classification ==
=== Elimination trials ===
Pos	No.	Driver	Time
1	7	Georges Boillot (FRA)	1:30.17
2	6	Jules Goux (FRA)	1:31.71
3	8	Teddy Tetzlaff (USA)	1:33.4
4	16	René Thomas (FRA)	1:35.2
5	26	Joe Dawson (USA)	1:36.2
6	25	Billy Carlson (USA)	1:36.4
7	21	Caleb Bragg (USA)	1:36.8
8	19	Spencer Wishart (USA)	1:37.1
9	9	Josef Christiaens (BEL)	1:38.67
10	4	Howdy Wilcox (USA)	1:39.16
11	24	Gil Andersen (USA)	1:39.46
12	17	Bob Burman (USA)	1:39.55
13	14	Arthur Duray (BEL)	1:40
14	31	Billy Knipper (USA)	1:40.48
15	43	Willie Haupt (USA)	1:40.68
16	10	Albert Guyot (FRA)	1:40.95
17	12	Jean Chassagne (FRA)	1:41.01
18	23	Ralph Mulford (USA)	1:42.03
19	42	Eddie Rickenbacker (USA)	1:42.11
20	18	Ralph DePalma (USA)	1:42.12
21	2	Earl Cooper (USA)	1:42.25
22	48	S. F. Brock (USA)	1:42.47
23	34	Ernest Friderich (FRA)	1:42.59
24	38	Billy Chandler (USA)	1:42.81
25	3	Barney Oldfield (USA)	1:43.15
26	13	George Mason (USA)	1:43.22
27	5	Charles Keene (USA)	1:43.6
28	15	Art Klein (USA)	1:43.6
29	1	Louis Disbrow (USA)	1:43.7
30	27	Harry Grant (USA)	1:44.09

== Starting grid ==
The starting grid was determined by a random draw the night before the race.

Row	Inside		Inside Center		Outside Center		Outside	
1	Pace car position		12	(France) Jean Chassagne R	8	(United States) Teddy Tetzlaff	4	(United States) Howdy Wilcox
2	38	(United States) Billy Chandler R	25	(United States) Billy Carlson R	23	(United States) Ralph Mulford	9	(Belgium) Josef Christiaens R
3	15	(United States) Art Klein R	21	(United States) Caleb Bragg	14	(Belgium) Arthur Duray R	10	(France) Albert Guyot
4	31	(United States) Billy Knipper	13	(United States) George Mason R	2	(United States) Earl Cooper R	16	(France) René Thomas R
5	24	(United States) Gil Andersen	26	(United States) Joe Dawson W	34	(France) Ernest Friderich R	6	(France) Jules Goux W
6	49	(United States) Ray Gilhooley R	48	(United States) S. F. Brock R	17	(United States) Bob Burman	42	(United States) Eddie Rickenbacker
7	1	(United States) Louis Disbrow	19	(United States) Spencer Wishart	27	(United States) Harry Grant	5	(United States) Charles Keene R
8	43	(United States) Willie Haupt	7	(France) Georges Boillot R	3	(United States) Barney Oldfield		

R Indianapolis 500 rookie
W Indianapolis 500 winner

== Box score ==
Finish	No.	Driver	Entrant	Car	Laps	Time / retired	Grid
1	16	(France) René Thomas R	Louis Delâge	Delage	200	82.470 mph	15
2	14	(Belgium) Arthur Duray R	Peugeot (Jacques Munier)	Peugeot	200	+6:38.50	10
3	10	(France) Albert Guyot	Delage (Albert Guyot)	Delage	200	+10:15.76	11
4	6	(France) Jules Goux W	Peugeot (Jules Goux)	Peugeot	200	+13:38.27	19
5	3	(United States) Barney Oldfield R (Gil Andersen)	Stutz	Stutz–Wisconsin	200	+20:05.55	30
6	9	(Belgium) Josef Christiaens R	Excelsior (Josef Christiaens)	Excelsior	200	+23:38.01	7
7	27	(United States) Harry Grant	Sunbeam	Sunbeam	200	+32:36.71	26
8	5	(United States) Charles Keene R (C. L. Rogers)	Beaver Bullet (Charles Keene)	Keene–Wisconsin	200	+37:11.83	27
9	25	(United States) Billy Carlson R (Harry Goetz) (Jack LeCain)	Maxwell / U.S. Motor	Maxwell	200	+58:56.61	5
10	42	(United States) Eddie Rickenbacker	Duesenberg	Duesenberg	200	+59:48.60	23
11	23	(United States) Ralph Mulford	Mercedes (E.J. Schroeder)	Mercedes	200	+1:07:34.01	6
12	43	(United States) Willie Haupt	Duesenberg	Duesenberg	200	+1:26:12.01	28
13	31	(United States) Billy Knipper (Bob Burman)	Keeton	Keeton–Wisconsin	200	+1:32:56.01	12
14	7	(France) Georges Boillot R	Peugeot (Georges Boillot)	Peugeot	141	Broken frame	29
15	34	(France) Ernest Friderich R	Ettore Bugatti	Bugatti	134	Drive pinion	18
16	1	(United States) Louis Disbrow	Bob Burman	Burman–Wisconsin	128	Connecting rod	24
17	19	(United States) Spencer Wishart	Mercer	Mercer	122	Cam gear	25
18	2	(United States) Earl Cooper R (Bill Rader)	Stutz	Stutz–Wisconsin	118	Wheel	14
19	21	(United States) Caleb Bragg (Eddie Pullen)	Mercer	Mercer	117	Camshaft	9
20	15	(United States) Art Klein R	King (Art Klein)	King–Wisconsin	87	Valve	8
21	38	(United States) Billy Chandler R	Braender Bulldog	Mulford–Duesenberg	69	Connecting rod	4
22	4	(United States) Howdy Wilcox	Gray Fox (Frank Fox)	Fox–Pope-Hartford	67	Valve	3
23	13	(United States) George Mason R (Lee Oldfield)	Mason Special	Duesenberg	66	Piston	13
24	17	(United States) Bob Burman	Bob Burman	Burman–Wisconsin	47	Connecting rod	22
25	26	(United States) Joe Dawson W	Marmon (Charles Ebstein)	Marmon	45	Crash	17
26	24	(United States) Gil Andersen	Stutz	Stutz–Wisconsin	42	Cylinder bolts	16
27	49	(United States) Ray Gilhooley R	Isotta (G.M. Heckschew)	Isotta	41	Crash	20
28	8	(United States) Teddy Tetzlaff	Maxwell / U.S. Motor	Maxwell	33	Rocker arm	2
29	12	(France) Jean Chassagne R	Sunbeam	Sunbeam	20	Crash	1
30	48	(United States) S. F. Brock R	Ray	Mercer–Wisconsin	5	Camshaft	21
Sources: MotorSport magazine, Racing-Reference

Note: Relief drivers in parentheses

W Former Indianapolis 500 winner

R Indianapolis 500 Rookie

=== Race statistics ===
Lap Leaders
Laps	Leader
1	Howdy Wilcox
2–4	Josef Christiaens
5	Jules Goux
6	Josef Christiaens
7	Caleb Bragg
8–12	Josef Christiaens
13–29	René Thomas
30–66	Arthur Duray
67-75	Albert Guyot
76–115	Arthur Duray
116–200	René Thomas

Total laps led
Laps	Leader
René Thomas	102
Arthur Duray	77
Josef Christiaens	9
Albert Guyot	9
Caleb Bragg	1
Jules Goux	1
Howdy Wilcox	1

== Gallery ==
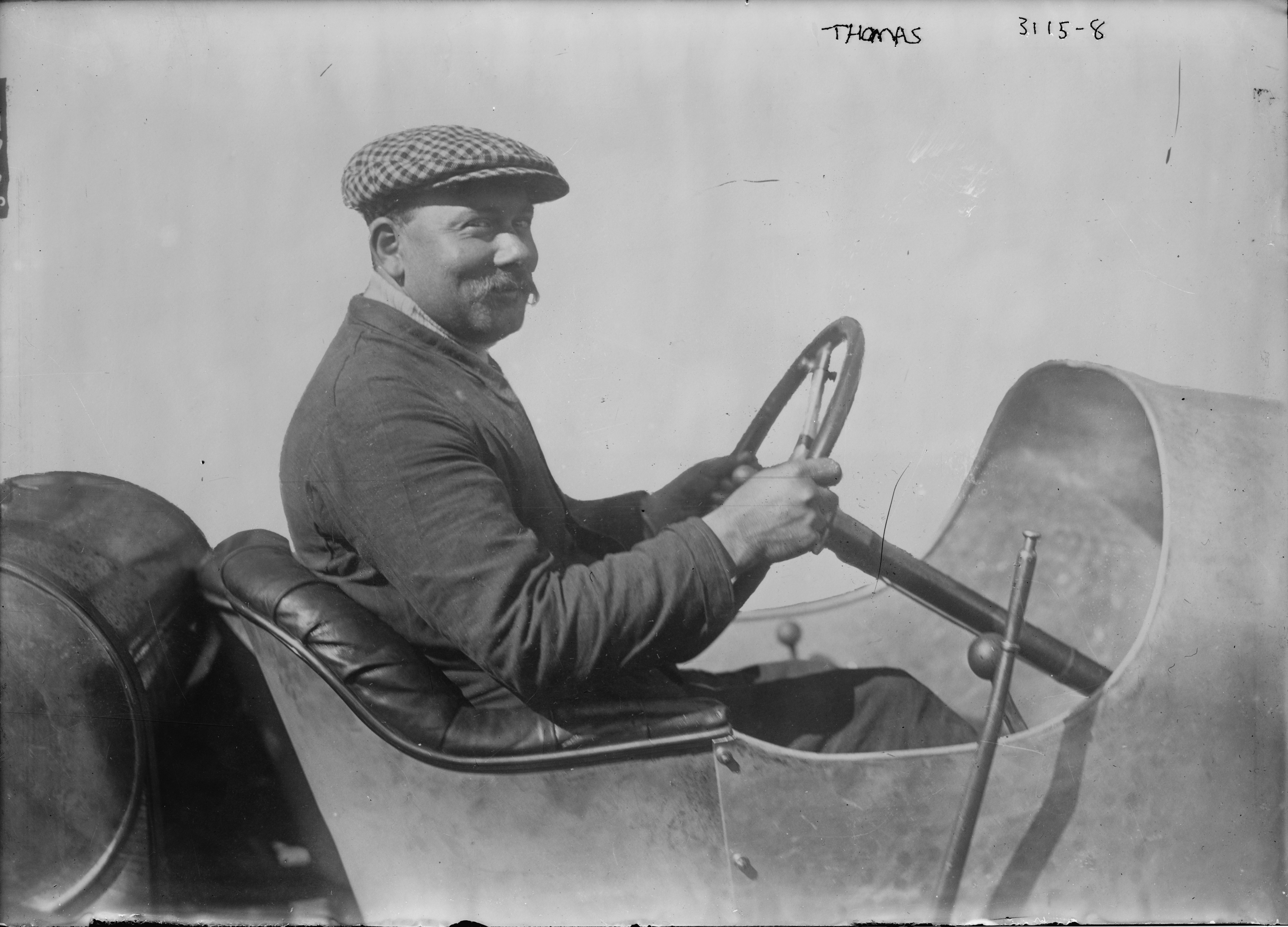
Winner René Thomas

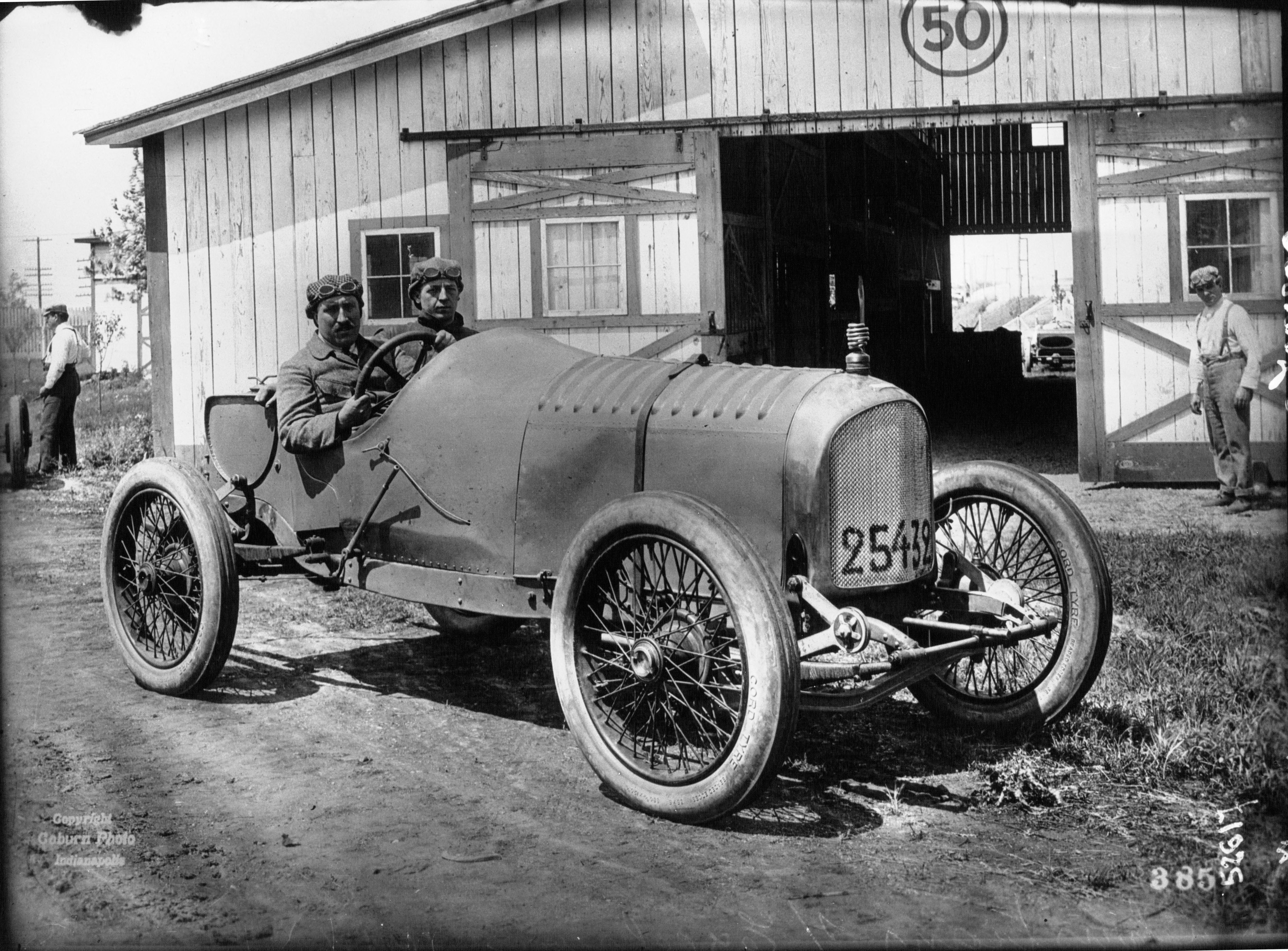
Josef Christiaens

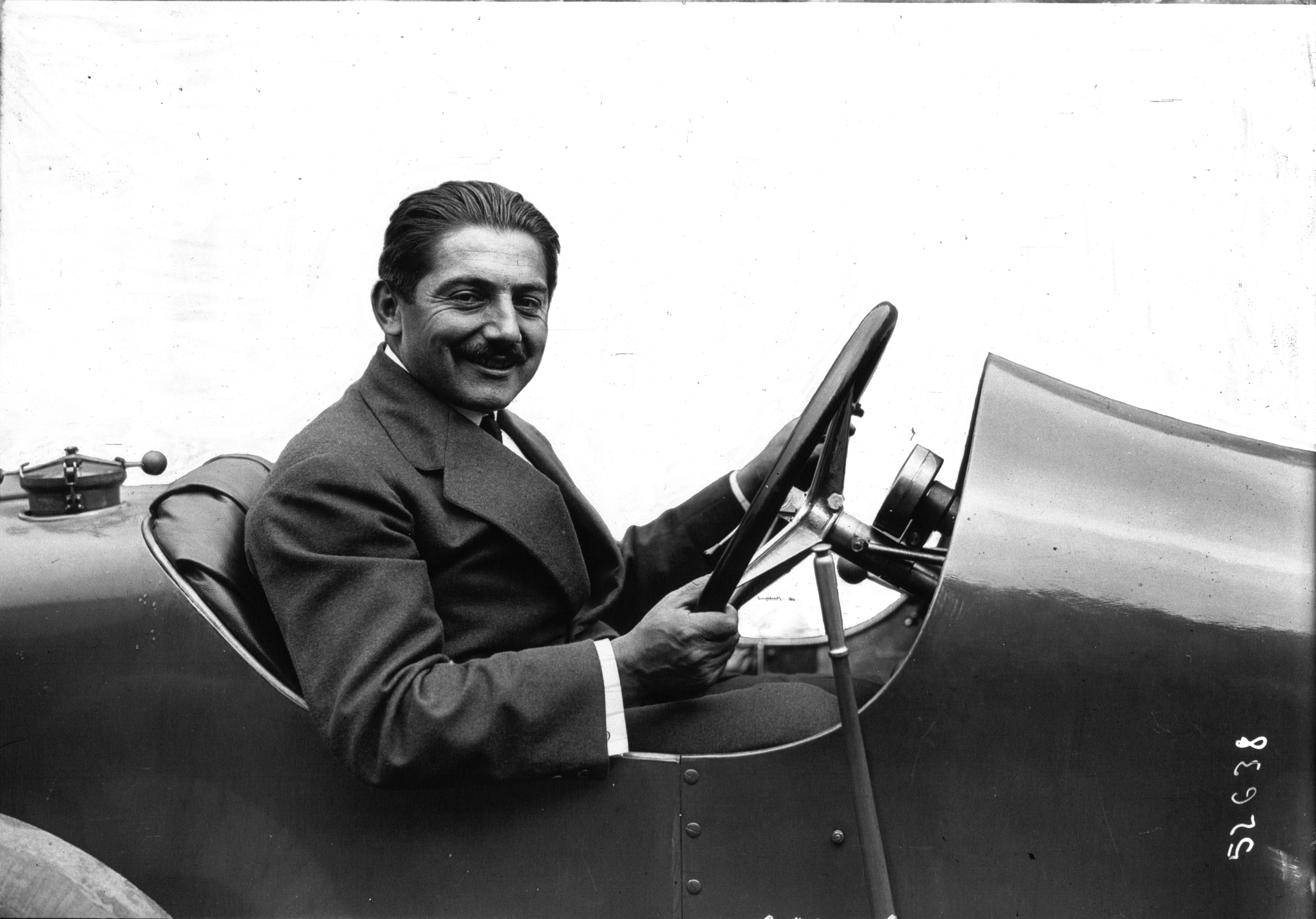
Georges Boillot

== Bibliography ==
- Kramer, Ralph (2009). Indianapolis Motor Speedway: 100 Years of Racing. Iola, WI: Krause. ISBN 978-0896898356. Archived from the original on September 14, 2017 – via Questia.
- Kramer, Ralph (2010). The Indianapolis 500: A Century of Excitement. Iola, WI: Krause. ISBN 978-1440214134. Archived from the original on September 14, 2017 – via Questia.

1913 Indianapolis 500; Jules Goux	1914 Indianapolis 500; Rene Thomas	1915 Indianapolis 500; Ralph DePalma
Preceded by 78.719 mph (1912 Indianapolis 500)	Record for the fastest average speed 82.474 mph	Succeeded by 89.840 mph (1915 Indianapolis 500)
