= Spencer Wishart =

American racing driver (1889–1914)

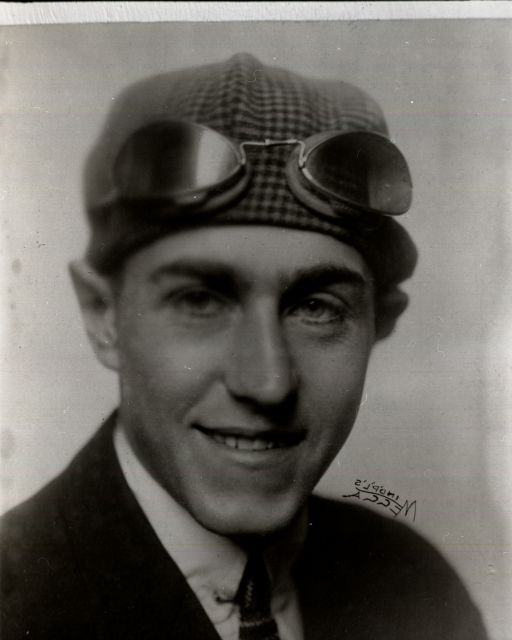
- Wishart in 1912
- Born: Spencer E. Wishart; December 3, 1889 Philadelphia, Pennsylvania, U.S.
- Died: August 14, 1914 (aged 24) Elgin, Illinois, U.S.

Champ Car career
- 26 races run over 6 years
- First race: 1909 Vanderbilt Cup (Long Island)
- Last race: 1914 Elgin National Trophy (Elgin)
- First win: 1912 Columbus 200 (Columbus)
Wins	Podiums	Poles
1	7	0

Spencer E. Wishart (December 3, 1889 – August 22, 1914) was an American racing driver. He was active during the early years of Indy car racing.

== Biography ==
Wishart was born on December 3, 1889, in Philadelphia, Pennsylvania.

Wishart was killed on August 22, 1914, at age 24 when he clipped another car during a 1914 AAA Championship Car season race in Elgin, Illinois. Wishart's car hit a fence and flipped, he was pinned beneath it and suffered a skull fracture and other injuries, dying in the hospital shortly thereafter. His mechanic John C. Jenter was also mortally injured in the crash. Wishart is interred at Kensico Cemetery in Valhalla, New York.

== Motorsports career results ==
=== Indianapolis 500 results ===
Year	Car	Start	Qual	Rank	Finish	Laps	Led	Retired
1911	11	11	—	—	4	200	5	Running
1912	7	6	83.950	9	15	82	0	Water line
1913	22	19	81.990	13	2	200	0	Running
1914	19	25	92.690	8	17	122	0	Camshaft
Totals						604	5	

Starts	4
Poles	0
Front Row	0
Wins	0
Top 5	2
Top 10	2
Retired	2

== Images ==
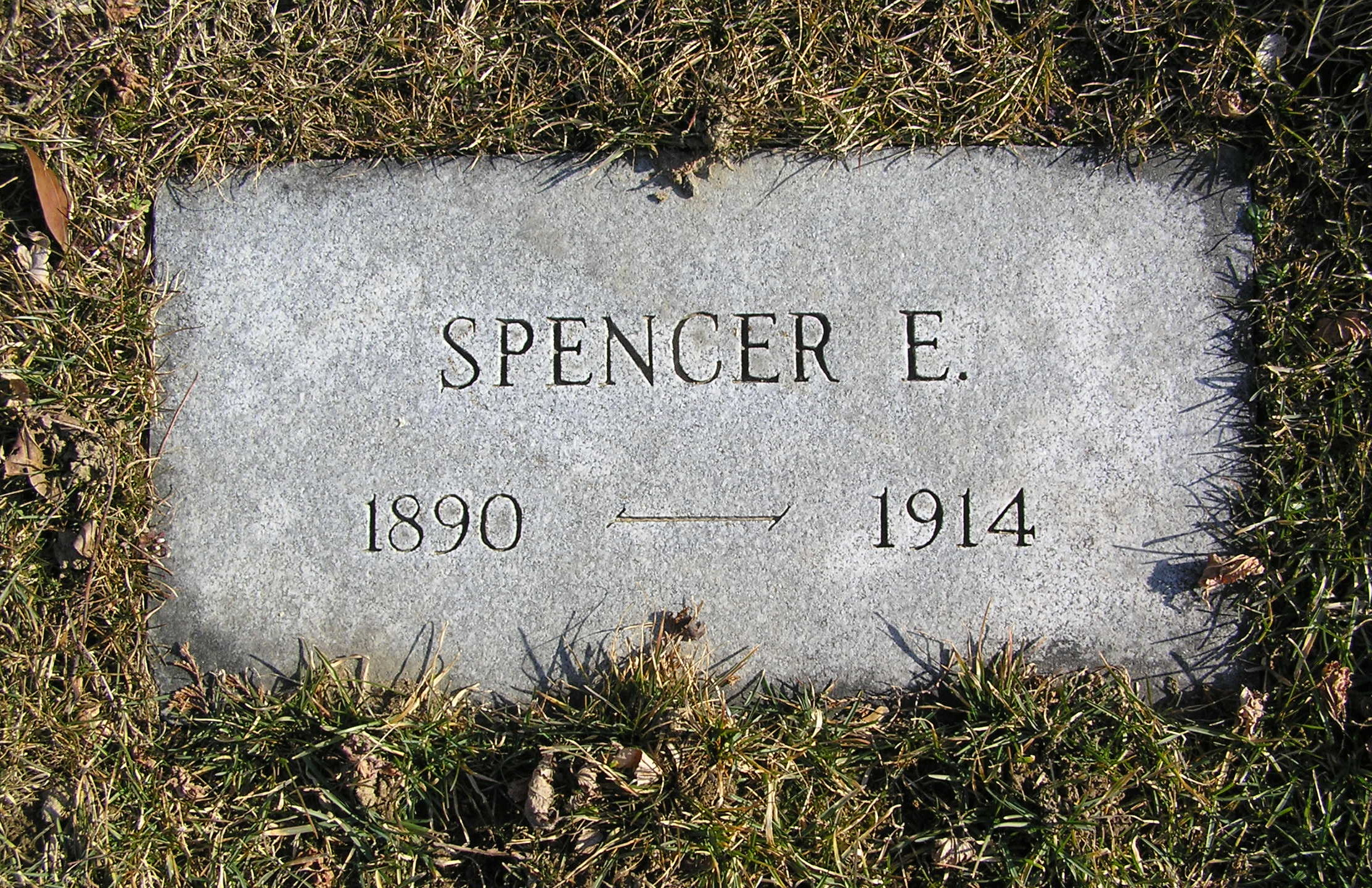
The footstone of Spencer Wishart

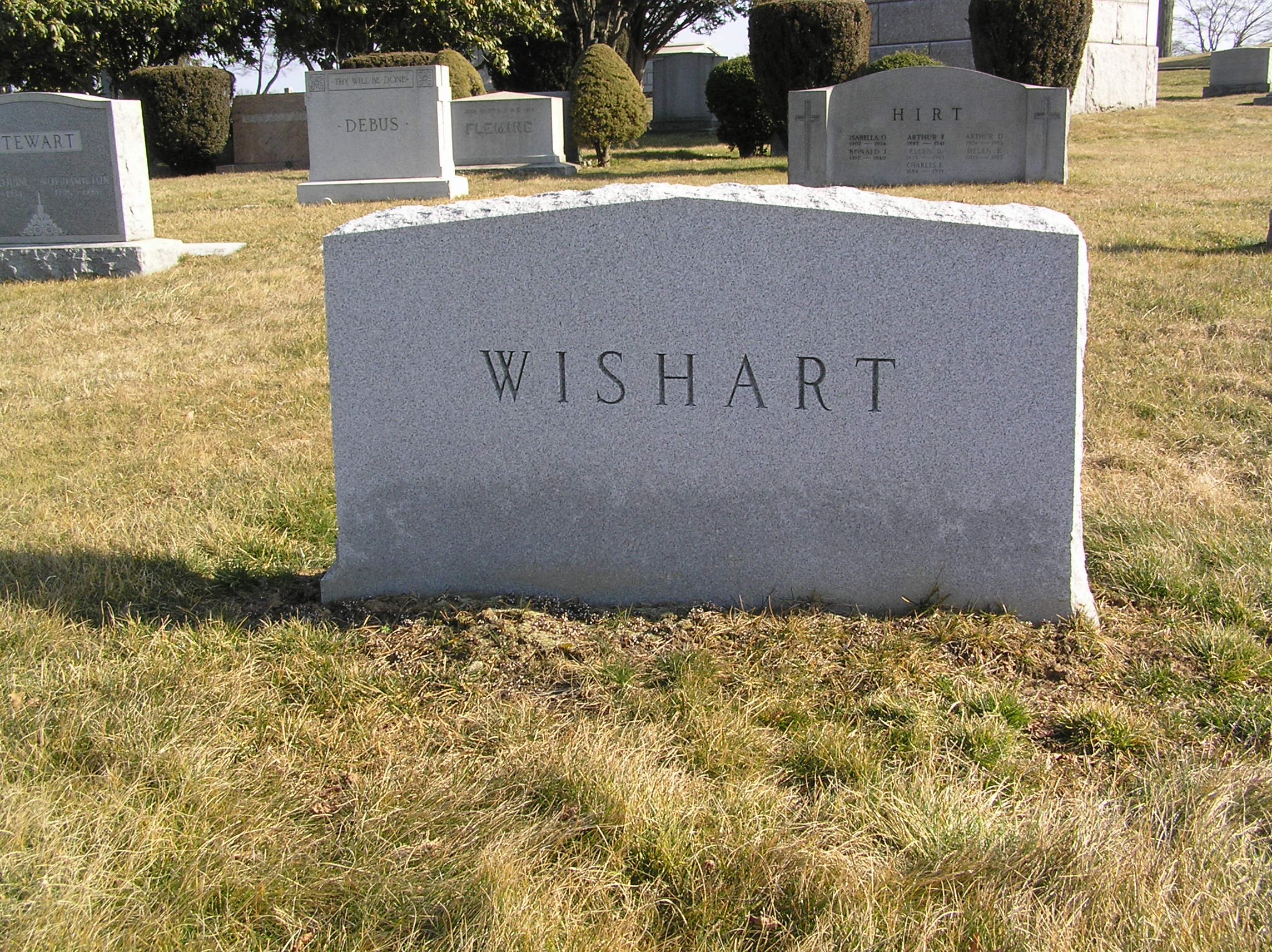
The tombstone of Spencer Wishart
