= Deserters Group =

Group of islands in British Columbia, Canada

Coordinates: 50°52′34″N 127°28′10″W

The Deserters Group is a small group of islands in the Queen Charlotte Strait region of the Central Coast of British Columbia, Canada, off the northeast coast of Vancouver Island to the north of Port Hardy. Deserters Island and Wishart Island are among it.

== Name origin ==
The name refers to a group of eight men who had been crew on the Norman Morrison, a Hudson's Bay Company vessel, who deserted the vessel while it was moored in Suquash Harbour, upon hearing news of gold in the Cariboo. Two stories relate their demise at the hands of local natives, one saying that the natives had mis-interpreted the ship's captain's offer to pay money per head, which was taken literally and so the men were killed rather than taken captive and returned to the ship. Another says that HBC representatives at Fort Rupert had instigated the murders by offering a dead-or-alive reward, though Governor Blanshard in his report to London about the incident said the incident was "baseless". The deserters include a James Wishart, whom Wishart Island and the Wishart Peninsula are named for, and A. Willoughby, for whom Willoughby Rock, which is off the north side of the Deserters Group, is named for.

== See also ==
- Deserter (disambiguation)
