= 1914 AAA Championship Car season =

Auto racing season

- AAA National Championship Trail

Season
- Races: 15
- Start date: February 26
- End date: November 26

Awards
- National champion: none declared
- Indianapolis 500 winner: (France) René Thomas

The 1914 AAA Championship Car season consisted of 15 races, beginning in Santa Monica, California on February 26 and concluding in Corona, California on November 26. AAA did not award points towards a National Championship during the 1914 season, and did not declare a National Champion. René Thomas was the winner of the Indianapolis 500.

The de facto National Champion as polled by the American automobile journal Motor Age, was Ralph DePalma. Points were not awarded by the AAA Contest Board during the 1914 season. DePalma was named the champion by Chris G. Sinsabaugh, an editor at Motor Age, based upon merit and on track performance. A points table was created retroactively in 1927. At a later point, it was recognized by historians that these championship results should be considered unofficial.

== Schedule and results ==
Date	Race Name Distance (miles)	Track	Location	Type	Notes	Pole position	Winning driver
February 26	William K. Vanderbilt Cup (295)	Santa Monica Road Race Course	Santa Monica, California	8.417 mile road course	In practice, Dave Lewis skidded, crashed into a crowd, and overturned, crushing to death a spectator, Lewis Smith, and seriously hurting himself and four other attendants.	Harry Grant	Ralph DePalma
February 28	American Grand Prize (404)	Santa Monica Road Race Course	Santa Monica, California	8.417 mile road course	ACA sanction	Eddie Pullen	Teddy Tetzlaff
May 30	International 500 Mile Sweepstakes	Indianapolis Motor Speedway	Speedway, Indiana	2.5 mile brick oval	450 cu in., Qualifications based upon demonstrated 75 mph single-lap speed, 30-car field	Arthur Duray	René Thomas
July 3	Golden Potlach Trophy Race (200)	Pacific Coast Speedway	Tacoma, Washington	2 mile dirt oval	600 cu in.		Hughie Hughes
July 4	Montamarathon Trophy Race (250)	Pacific Coast Speedway	Tacoma, Washington	2 mile dirt oval	Free-for-all		Earl Cooper
July 4	Sioux City Race (300)	Sioux City Speedway	North Sioux City, South Dakota	2 mile dirt oval		Gil Andersen	Eddie Rickenbacker
July 30	Galveston Race 1 (50)	Denver Beach Course	Galveston, Texas	5 mile beach course			Ralph Mulford
August 1	Galveston Race 2 (50)	Denver Beach Course	Galveston, Texas	2.5 mile beach course			Ralph Mulford
August 3	Galveston Race 3 (50)	Denver Beach Course	Galveston, Texas	2.5 mile beach course			Ralph Mulford
August 21	Chicago Auto Club Trophy Race (301)	Elgin Road Race Course	Elgin, Illinois	8.384 mile road course		Frank Dearborn	Ralph DePalma
August 22	Elgin National Trophy Race (301)	Elgin Road Race Course	Elgin, Illinois	8.384 mile road course	Spencer Wishart and his riding mechanic Jack Jenter fatally injured	Frank Dearborn	Ralph DePalma
September 26	Kalamazoo Race (100)	Recreation Park	Kalamazoo, Michigan	1 mile dirt oval	Free-formula		Bob Burman
October 22	Galesburg Race (100)	Galesburg District Fairgrounds	Galesburg, Illinois	1 mile dirt oval	Fritz Walker, riding mechanic for Jack Gable, fatally injured		Ralph Mulford
October 24	St. Paul Race (100)	Minnesota State Fair Speedway	St. Paul, Minnesota	1 mile dirt oval			Tom Alley
November 26	Corona Race (302)	Grand Boulevard	Corona, California	2.768 mile road course		Barney Oldfield	Eddie Pullen

== Leading National Championship standings ==
The points paying system for the 1909–1915 and 1917–1919 season were retroactively applied in 1927 and revised in 1951 using the points system from 1920.

#	Driver	Sponsor	Points
1	Ralph DePalma	Mercedes	2045
2	Eddie Pullen	Mercer	1720
3	René Thomas	Delage	1000
4	Barney Oldfield	Stutz	990
5	Ralph Mulford	Peugeot	780

== General references ==
- http://www.champcarstats.com/year/1914.htm accessed 8/21/15
- http://www.teamdan.com/archive/gen/indycar/1914.html accessed 8/21/15
