= 1916 Grand Prix season =

Grand Prix season

Seasons
- ← 1915 1919 →

The 1916 Grand Prix season saw Grand Prix motor racing continue in the United States. Racing was suspended in Europe due to the World War I engulfing the continent. Once again European cars dominated Indianapolis with victory going to Briton Dario Resta in a Peugeot. With the organisers wanting to appeal to the spectators, this was the only year that the race was scheduled for a shorter length – to run only 300 miles. The Vanderbilt Cup and the American Grand Prize returned to Santa Monica, California, at the end of the year. Resta repeated his victory from the year before, winning the Vanderbilt Cup. Then when he retired in the Grand Prize it was Howdy Wilcox and Johnny Aitken who won in another of the dominant Peugeots. Oval courses now dominated the AAA Championship with these two events being the only road-course races this year. It proved to be the final time these two formative American races were held in this format; while racing in America continued throughout the First World War, public interest had shifted away from road racing.

With five victories across the season, the AAA national championship was won by Dario Resta.

== Major races ==
Date	Name	Circuit	Race Regulations	Race Distance	Winner’s Time	Winning driver	Winning constructor	Report
30 May	(United States) VI Indianapolis 500	Indianapolis	Indianapolis	300 miles	3h 34m	(United Kingdom) Dario Resta	Peugeot EX-5	Report
16 Nov	(United States) XI Vanderbilt Cup	Santa Monica	AAA	300 miles	3h 23m	(United Kingdom) Dario Resta	Peugeot EX-5	Report
18 Nov	(United States) VII American Grand Prize	Santa Monica	ACA	400 miles	7h 08m	(United States) Howdy Wilcox	Peugeot EX-5	Report

== Regulations and technical ==
As the Great War rolled inexorably through its second devastating year across Europe, the only motor-racing of note was the AAA National Championship. Even so, austerity measures limited the American season – with only fifteen events contributing to the championship down from the 27 of the previous year, although there were a number of unofficial events. Organisers of the International Sweepstakes at Indianapolis reduced it to 300 miles for the first and only time in its history, nominally to encourage more entries and incite greater crowd-appeal than the previous 5-6 hour marathons.

This year, for the first time since the 1905 season, the AAA instituted a points-system for its championship races. Points were awarded to the top ten cars still running at the end, with more points awarded to longer races in a sliding scale. Drivers only got points for a car they started a race in and if they were relieved during the race, they would score a percentage of points based on the percentage of laps they were in their car.

The Grand Prize was sanctioned by the American Automobile Association (AAA) Contest Board, and was featured as points-paying event on the AAA Championship Car calendar. The engine regulations were left unchanged from 1915 – with the Grand Prize and Vanderbilt Cup running to a limit of 450 cu in (7.38 litres) and Indianapolis at 300 cu in (4.92 litres).

== Season review ==
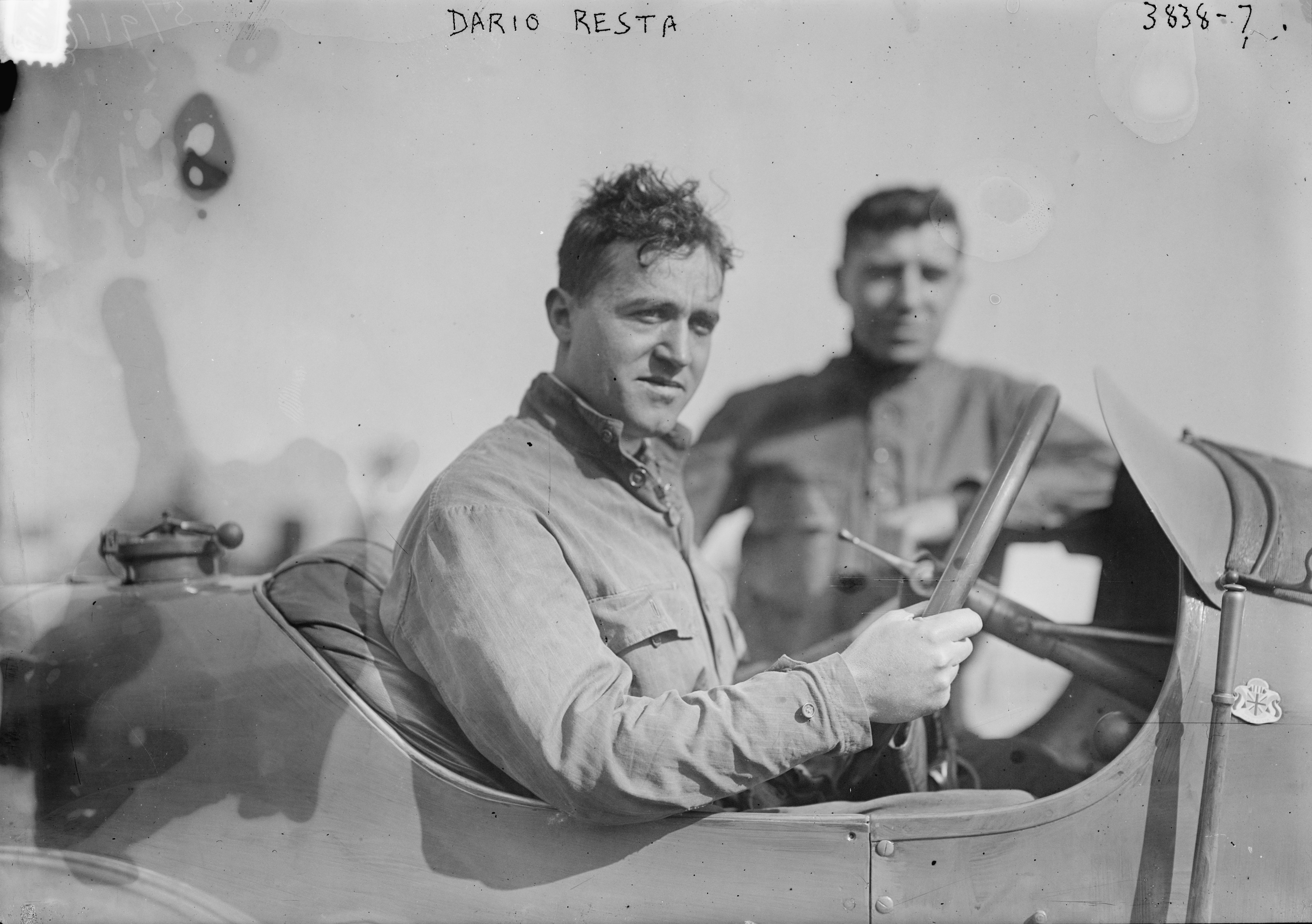
Dario Resta, 1916 AAA champion for Peugeot

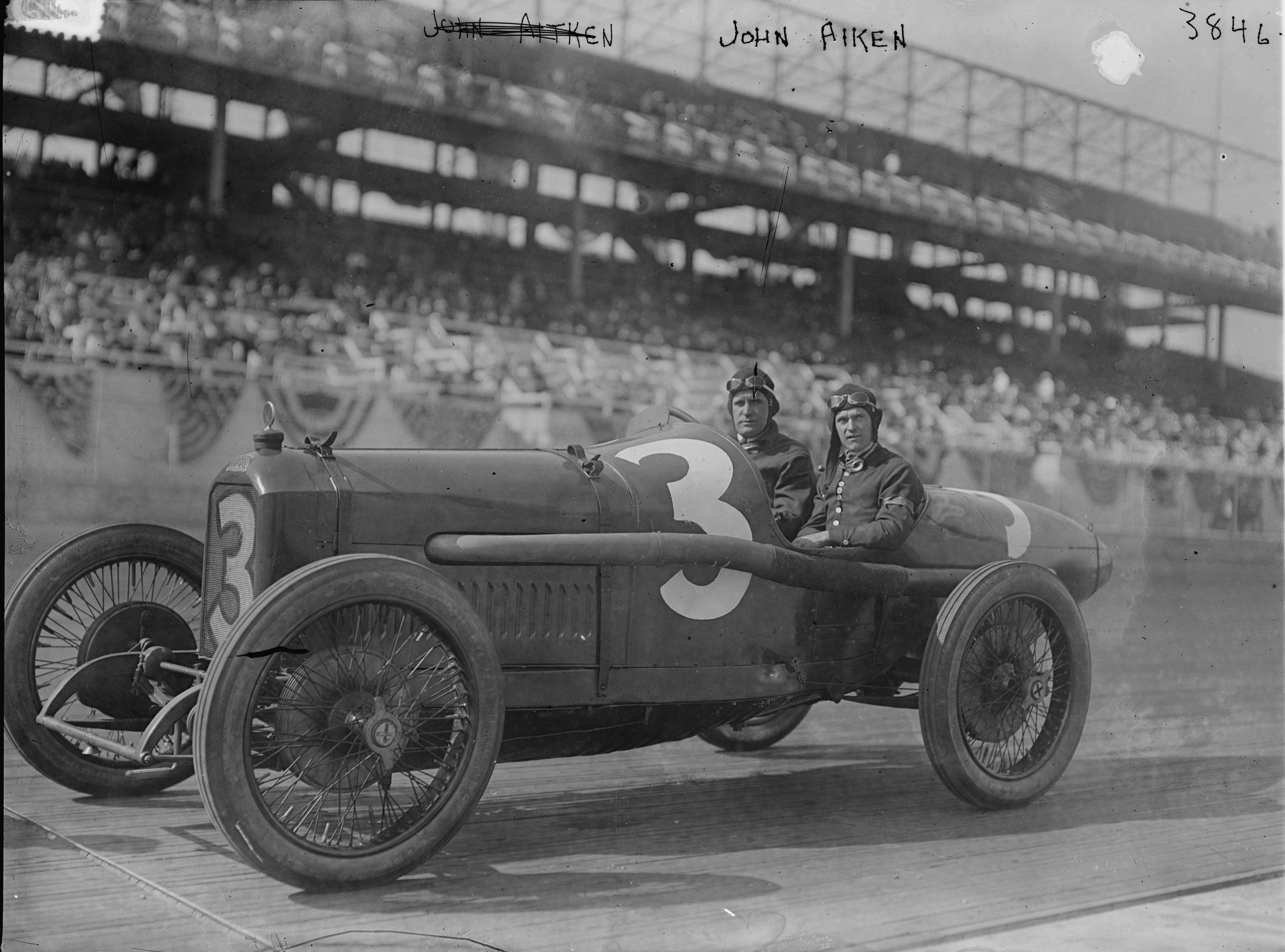
Johnny Aitken, Peugeot

see also 1916 AAA Championship Car season

Only 24 entries arrived for the Indianapolis race and 21 cars took the start (the smallest in the race’s history). The Peugeot Auto Racing team had prepared new cars for Dario Resta, Ralph Mulford, Johnny Aitken and veteran Charlie Merz. Shortly after the end of the 1914 French Grand Prix, Carl Fisher had purchased two of the Peugeot EX-5s and gave them to Premier for three replicas to be made. These were ready for the race and the team hired former Stutz drivers Howdy Wilcox and Norwegian-American Gil Anderson, as well as Tom Rooney. The cars looked identical to the Peugeots but were noticeably slower. The Premiers and the American Peugeot drivers were all entered by the Indianapolis Speedway Team to bolster the entry numbers.

Duesenberg had cars for Eddie O'Donnell and Wilbur D'Alene although only the latter qualified. Duesenberg also provided the engines for the new Crawford chassis. Eddie Rickenbacker was team leader for Maxwell along with Canadian Pete Henderson. Along with several specials, a new entry were the Frontenacs of the three Chevrolet brothers, Louis and Arthur. Gaston’s car did not qualify for the race. French manufacturer Delage arranged for cars for Jules Devigne as well as Barney Oldfield and Jack LeCain. The international field was rounded out with Belgian Josef Christiaens running a British Sunbeam and Aldo Franchi in a Peugeot with a Sunbeam engine.

A significant absentee was Ralph DePalma, the 1915 race-winner. He was to run with the new Hudson team but they had submitted their team entries too late while DePalma was haggling with the organisers to get paid appearance money. It was also without Bob Burman, as he and his mechanic had been killed in April when his Peugeot lost a wheel and crashed while leading a non-championship event at Corona, Los Angeles.

Fastest car in qualifying was Johnny Aitken’s Peugeot, with the front row filled out with Rickenbacker and Andersen. From the start it was Rickenbacker who took the lead, holding it for the first nine laps until his steering gave out. Aitken then took the lead for eight laps until he was passed by Resta. From there on the Briton stayed in the front with a trouble-free run after Aitken retired, winning by two minutes from d’Alene’s Duesenberg with Mulford’s Peugeot in third. The race was marred by a serious accident on lap 61 to Jack LeCain that left him critically injured. He had not qualified but was driving as relief for de Vigne when the Delage crashed. His mechanic and a spectator also suffered lesser injuries.

DePalma was present a fortnight later, in his Mercedes GP, at the next event at Maywood oval, Chicago. In a tight wheel-to-wheel battle he duelled with Resta for almost three hours until a sparkplug failed on his engine, giving Resta the win by two minutes. DePalma won the next two rounds with Resta not racing though the British driver then won at the Omaha speedway in an event overshadowed by the death of Aldo Franchi's riding mechanic. Johnnie Aitken then won four of the next six races to leap into title contention.

This year the Vanderbilt Cup and Grand Prize were held in November, back at Santa Monica where they had been held previously in 1914. They were the only road-races in the championship. Going into the weekend, Aitken (3440 pts) had a 240-point lead over Resta (3200 pts), with Rickenbacker a distant third with 2210 pts. Resta, Aitken and their Peugeots were entered, along with Rickenbacker in William Weightman’s Duesenberg but not DePalma. Ira Vail led a trio of Hudsons, Earl Cooper was in his Stutz and Lewis Jackson in a Marmon. Practice was marred by a fatal accident to Harry Horstman, an unofficial entry, on the track without permission. Mike Moosie was fastest in practice in a Duesenberg with Jackson second.

Rickenbacker retired early with a ruined gearbox, while Aitken was out just after the halfway mark with engine problems. This left Resta to win the race comfortably by eight minutes, repeating his victory from the year before. After 200 gruelling miles he was content to drink a pint of milk to celebrate. Second was Earl Cooper’s Stutz with Weightman third and the three Hudsons the only other finishers.

Two days later, most of the same drivers met again for the Grand Prize. Howdy Wilcox was also entered in another Peugeot EX5 along with Cliff Durant in a Stutz (entered by the Chevrolet Motor Company). The 900 points Resta had got for his Vanderbilt Cup victory now put him in front of the points-table, ahead of Aitken who had scored none.

Once again, Mike Moosie was on pole position, and in a sensation Aitken retired after only one lap with a broken piston. On lap 13, there was a tragic accident. Lew Jackson lost control of his Marmon after the bend on the fast back straight. He veered off the road, hitting a palm tree then ploughed into an ice-cream stand. Jackson and three of the public were killed outright, while his mechanic and two other spectators were injured. Six laps later, Resta’s car also broke down when its ignition failed. Then Aitken joined Howdy Wilcox, leading the race, as a relief driver. Unaware of the rule that only the starting driver would score any points (a precedent set with Rickenbacker at the Indianapolis race earlier in the year) Resta was alarmed that he would now lose the championship. He approached Earl Cooper, running second, offering to buy and drive his Stutz “at any price”. But Cooper refused and carried on to finish second behind the Wilcox/Aitken Peugeot. When the officials confirmed that Aitken would not score any points, Resta was relieved.

The final event of the season was held at the end of November. The Ascot Derby was a short 150-mile race held at Ascot, Los Angeles, and with only 700 points for the winner, neither Resta nor Aitken showed up. It was won by Rickenbacker who cemented third place in the points’ standings ahead of DePalma.

While auto racing continued in the United States after their entry into the First World War, the Indianapolis Motor Speedway was turned over to the government to use. The 1917 AAA Championship Car season would not be run with a points-awarding championship, with such a format not returning until the 1920 season. Eddie Rickenbacker would go on to become the United States’ top-scoring flying ace of the war. Johnny Aitken died in 1918, a victim of the influenza epidemic. The Vanderbilt Cup and the American Grand Prize were allowed to lapse during the war, with American racing shifting towards ovals. Road-racing faded into obscurity in the United States for nearly twenty years.

Citations
