= Harvest Auto Racing Classic =

Series of auto races

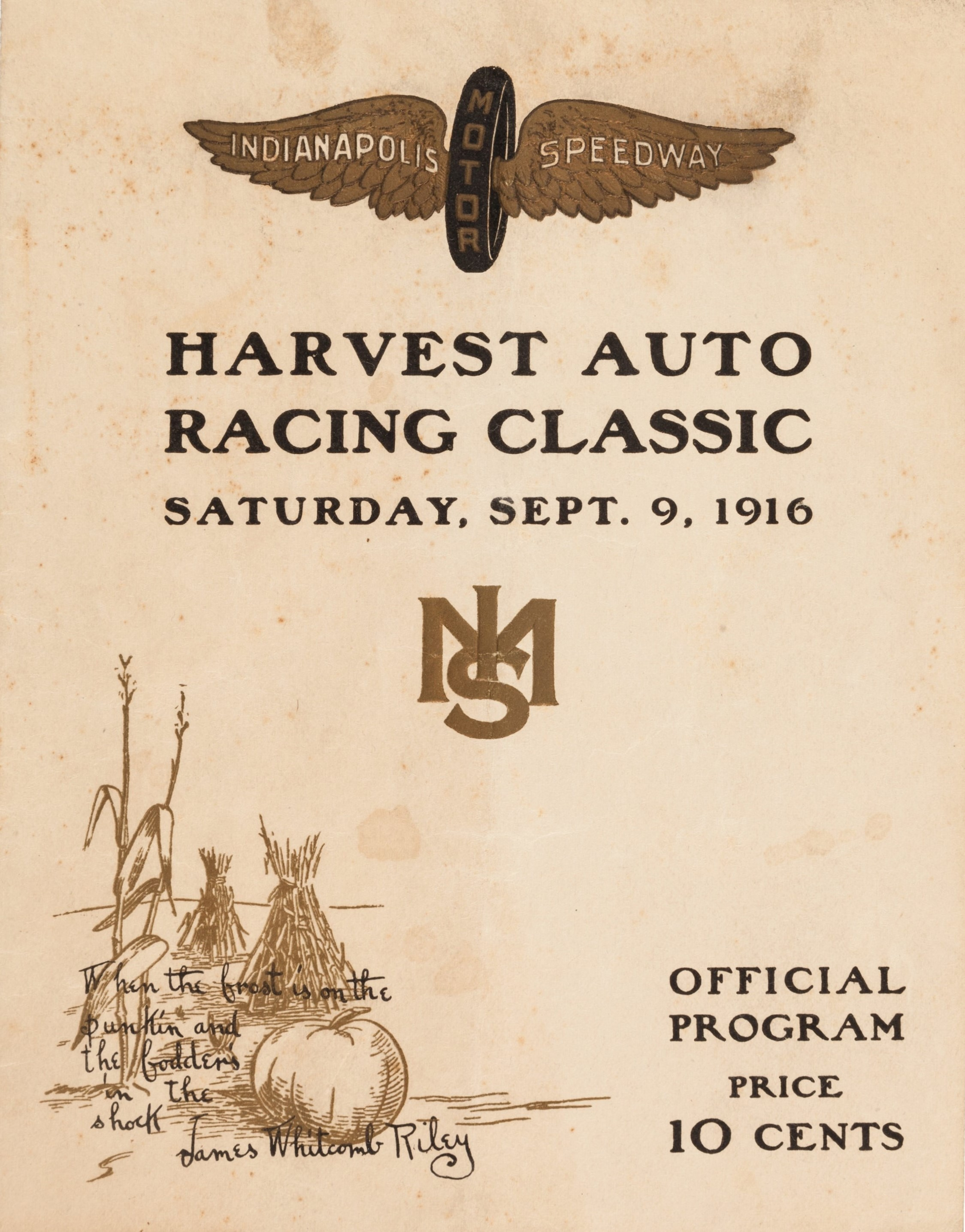

AAA Championship Car
- Venue: Indianapolis Motor Speedway Road Course
- First race: 1916
- Distance: 100 miles (1st race); 100 miles (2nd race)
- Laps: 42 Laps (Race 1); 42 Laps (Race 2)
- Most wins (driver): Johnny Aitken
- Most wins (manufacturer): Peugeot

The Harvest Auto Racing Classic was a series of three automobile races held at the Indianapolis Motor Speedway on Saturday September 9, 1916. The meet, held four months after the 1916 Indianapolis 500, featured a 20-mile race, a 50-mile race, and a 100-mile race. The main event, a 100-mile Championship Car race, paid points towards the 1916 AAA National Championship. Johnny Aitken won all three races, two of which had a margin of victory of less than a car length.

The event was a unique footnote in the history of the Indianapolis Motor Speedway. Between 1911 and 1993, the Harvest Auto Racing Classic was the only time an official race other than the Indianapolis 500 was contested at the track. It was also the last event held at the facility prior to the United States involvement in World War I. The track would shut down for two years (1917–1918) during the war, and reopened in 1919.

== Race background ==
Advertisement for the Harvest Auto Racing Classic.

The 1916 Indianapolis 500 was held on May 30, 1916. Under unique circumstances, the race was scheduled for 300 miles rather than the traditional 500-mile distance. World War I was escalating abroad, but the United States had not yet entered the war. Parallel to that, Speedway president Carl G. Fisher was in an ongoing feud with the local hoteliers, and at the same time was under a false impression that fans thought that 500 miles was too long of a race. He believed in the idea that fans may better enjoy a shorter event, and thus the race was shortened to a 300-mile distance. After a lackluster reception, the decision was quickly reversed, and the Memorial Day classic was to revert to 500 miles for 1917. The 1917 Indianapolis 500 was scheduled, however, Speedway management understood that the race may be cancelled on account of the United States entering the war.

For 1916, the AAA Contest Board established and recognized an official points-paying National Championship of drivers. Between the years of 1904 and 1919, although AAA sanctioned many races, an official national championship was only awarded in 1905 and 1916. In an effort to bolster the 1916 season, it was decided to add a second race meet at the Indianapolis Motor Speedway. After hosting multiple race meets in 1909 and 1910, starting in 1911 the Indianapolis 500 would be the only race held annually. This second race meet would be the first time in five years that another race would be held at the famous and well-equipped Brickyard.

The event was seen by Carl Fisher as an opportunity for the Speedway to generate gate revenue, particularly if the 1917 Indianapolis 500 were to be cancelled, which it ultimately was. It was the last time a race other than the Indianapolis 500 was held at the Indianapolis Motor Speedway until the Brickyard 400 began in 1994.

The race was given the title the Harvest Auto Racing Classic, a reference to the harvest season of late summer/early autumn. The event was originally planned for Labor Day weekend, however, the new board track in Cincinnati took the Labor Day date. To avoid a conflict, and to attract a stronger field, Indianapolis chose to run the weekend after. The race was scheduled for Saturday September 9, which also conveniently fell after the close of the Indiana State Fair. The meet would consist of three races, a 20-mile race, a 50-mile race, followed by a 100-mile race. The first two races would be non-points races, while the 100-mile race would pay AAA championship points. The track would be made available for practice and testing for a couple days prior to race day. To entertain fans, a band contest was included as part of the festivities.

=== Race rules ===
All three races of the Harvest Auto Racing Classic were run under the auspices of the AAA Contest Board, and were contested with the same cars that ran in the Indianapolis 500 and other national championship events. Drivers could participate in one, two, or all three of the races. Each race was scored independently, and respective results in each race had no bearing on subsequent races. Separate cash prizes were posted for each of the three races. Riding mechanics were utilized.

Officials decided not to have a pace car for the first two shorter races. For the 20-mile and 50-mile races, the field would be lined up about 50 yards north of the start/finish line. When the signal was given, the field conducted a rolling start to the stripe. For the 100-mile race, it was decided to utilize a pace car. The field circulated for one unscored warm-up lap, and started the race from a flying start, in the same manner as the Indianapolis 500.

=== Entry list ===
As many as 25 entries were expected, however, the final entry list consisted of only twenty cars, and that number later dwindled. More than one entry withdrew from the weekend, some after suffering irreparable damage at Cincinnati. The short field was considered a disappointment for the event, as it mirrored the low turnout experienced in May. No elimination trials were held, ostensibly due to the small field of entries, and due to the fact that all cars had practiced over 95 mph. A blind draw was conducted mid-week for each of the three races to set the starting lineups. However, the grids were later adjusted based on car counts.

Dario Resta, the winner of the "500" back in May, did not enter after blowing the engine in his car at Cincinnati. Ralph DePalma, the 1915 "500" winner had skipped the 1916 race due to a dispute with management over appearance fees. DePalma and the track reconciled, and he submitted an entry, but since he blew his Mercedes engine at Cincinnati, it was unclear for a few days which car he would drive. Later in the week, DePalma was named to the Peugeot team owned by the Speedway, taking over the car of Charlie Merz. Also failing to arrive was William Muller, who suffered an engine failure at the Cincinnati race, and Gil Anderson who was seriously injured after a crash at Cincinnati.

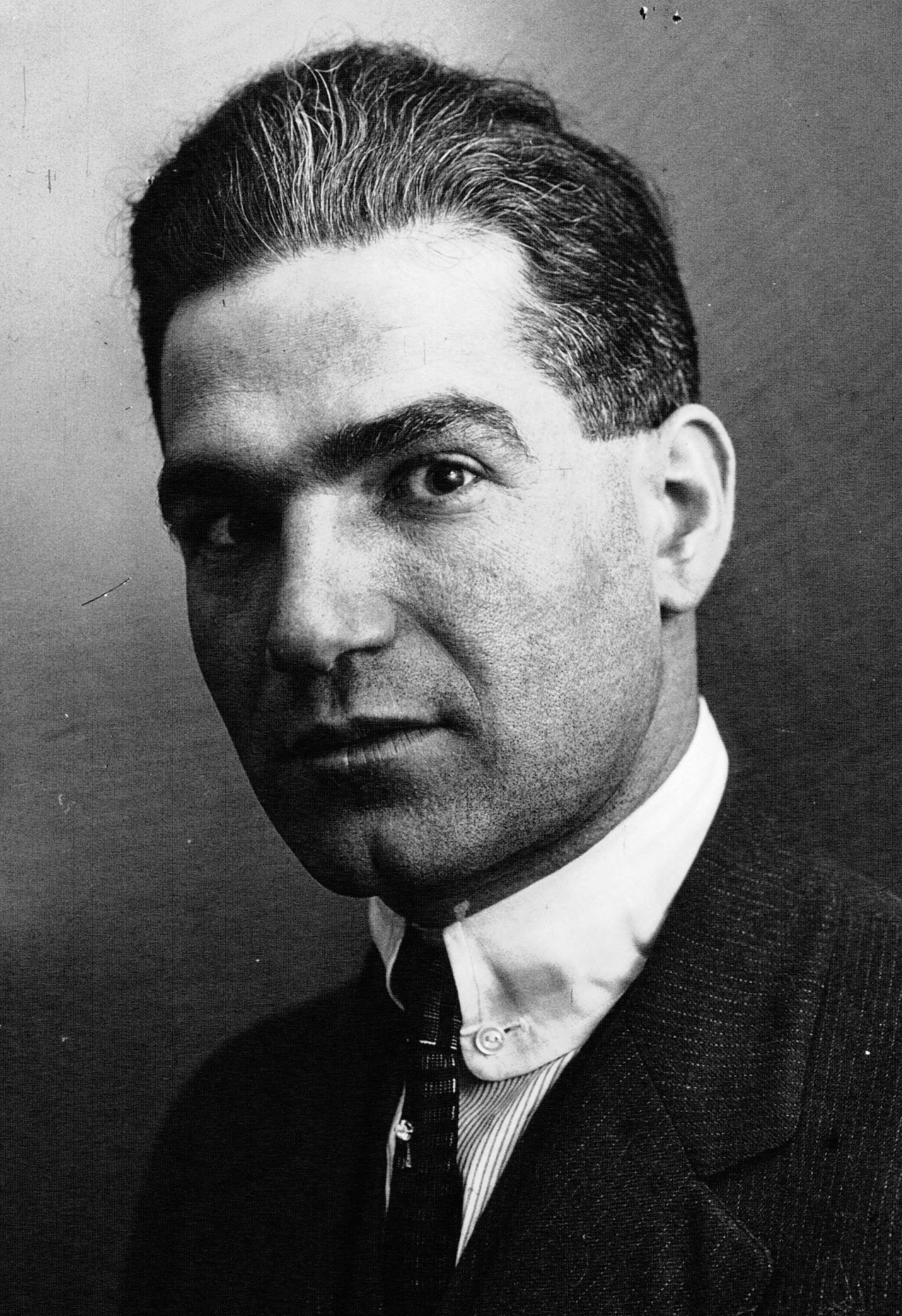
Ralph DePalma entered the event after skipping the 1916 Indianapolis 500.

Car	Driver	Notes
Burman Special	(United States) Jack Gable	Did not arrive
Dans l'Argent	(United States) William Muller	Did not arrive
Duesenberg	(United States) Tommy Milton	
Duesenberg	(United States) Wilbur D'Alene	
Duesenberg	(United States) George Buzane	
Duesenberg	(United States) Charles Devlin	
Hoskins Special	(United States) Tom Alley	replaced by Hughie Hughes
Kleinart	(United States) Art Klein	withdrew
Maxwell	(United States) Eddie Rickenbacker	
Maxwell	(Canada) Pete Henderson	
Omar	(United States) Omar Toft	
Ostewig Special	(United States) Swan Ostewig	
Peugeot	(United States) Johnny Aitken	
Peugeot	(United States) Charlie Merz	replaced by Ralph DePalma
Premier	(United States) Dave Lewis	
Premier	(United States) Howdy Wilcox	
Rawlings	unnamed	
Sunbeam	(Belgium) Josef Christiaens	
Sunbeam	(United States) Frank Galvin	replaced by Louis Chevrolet
TBA	(United States) Ralph DePalma	DePalma took over Peugeot entry

== Practice ==
The track was made available for participants to practice on Thursday September 6 and Friday September 7, as well as Saturday morning. By Wednesday, several of the participants were arriving from the Cincinnati race held the previous weekend. Hometown driver Johnny Aitken, the 1916 Indianapolis 500 pole-sitter, and winner on Monday at Cincinnati, entered the event as the favorite. George Buzane's team was the first entrant to arrive from Cincinnati. Frank Gavin and Josef Christiaens of the Sunbeam team also arrived Wednesday. Christiaens' car, however would later suffer a broken crankshaft during a practice run. Despite round the clock work, the team would be unable to rebuild the engine and Christiaens was forced to sit out all three races.

On Thursday September 7, Wilbur D'Alene became the first driver to take to the track. He completed a few practice laps, but no other drivers went out. On Friday September 8, Johnny Aitken led the speed chart with a lap of 98.9 mph. He ran three more fast laps, then parked his car for the day. Other cars taking practice laps were Dave Lewis, Josef Christiaens, and George Buzane. As practice continued, several drivers announced their intentions to skip the 20-mile and/or the 50-mile races, in favor of concentrating on the important 100-mile championship race. Eddie Rickenbacker and Tommy Milton decided only to race the 100-mile event, while Johnny Aitken and Ralph DePalma were among those who elected to attempt all three.

Light ticket sales during the week began to worry Speedway management. The Indiana State Fair closed on Friday, which the Speedway hoped would help bolster the Saturday crowd at the track. Instead, it began to appear that the locals did not have the interest to attend the races so soon after the fair. On Friday, Speedway general manager Theodore E. "Pop" Myers announced that the start time for Saturday would be pushed back from 1:30 p.m. to 2 p.m. This would allow fans that had to work on Saturday morning additional time to travel to the track.

On Saturday morning, a final practice session and a band contest was held to entertain early-arriving spectators. Johnny Aitken ran a practice lap of 1 minute-31 seconds, matching his lap time from Friday. Also turning fast laps were Wilcox and Lewis. Art Klein was considering withdrawing due to engine trouble, and William Muller did withdraw. Driver Jack Gable was unable to arrive from Chicago to drive the Burman Special, which left as few as 14 cars ready to race in the garage area.

== 20 mile race ==
The competition for the day began with an 8-lap, 20-mile race at about 2 p.m. A mostly disappointing crowd of only 10,000-12,000 spectators arrived on a sunny, pleasant afternoon A total of ten cars lined up for a posted $1,000 prize purse. Some drivers, including Eddie Rickenbacker, elected to sit out the two shorter sprint races and instead save their machines for the 100-mile race to be held later in the day. Louis Chevrolet drew the pole position for the 20-mile race, and the field lined up in three rows. From a standing start about fifty yards north of the start/finish line, the field rolled en masse to the timing line, and flagman Charles Sedwick waved the red flag to start the race.

Johnny Aitken took the lead from the outside of the front row, with Louis Chevrolet in second and Howdy Wilcox in third. Pete Henderson dropped out on the first lap. Wilcox passed Chevrolet for second place on lap two, while Aitken continued to lead.

At the halfway point, Aitken and Wilcox were running nose to tail. The top two cars had stretched a lead of about 200 yards over Chevrolet in third place. On the final lap, Wilcox followed closely behind Aitken, but Aitken was able to hold off the challenge. Aitken won the race by 0.33 seconds, about one car length. Aitken collected $400 for first place, Wilcox received $300 for second, Chevrolet $200 for third, and Hughes $100 for fourth.

Finish	Start	No.	Driver	Car	Laps	Status
1	4	1	(United States) Johnny Aitken	Peugeot	8	12:37.35 (95.08 mph)
2	8	5	(United States) Howdy Wilcox	Premier	8	+0.33
3	1	x	(United States) Louis Chevrolet	Sunbeam	8	+34.65
4	10	19	(United Kingdom) Hughie Hughes	Hoskins Special	8	+58.65
5	6	6	(United States) Dave Lewis	Premier	8	+1:26.50
6	5	18	(United States) Ralph DePalma	Peugeot	8	+1:27.27
7	7	14	(United States) George Buzane	Duesenberg	8	+1:33.99
8	2	17	(United States) Jay McNey	Ostewig Special	8	+3:14.83
9	9	9	(Canada) Pete Henderson	Maxwell	0	Out
10	3	x	(United States) Art Klein	Kleinart	0	Out

== 50 mile race ==
The second race of the day was a 20-lap/50-mile event, with a $2,000 posted purse. Nine cars lined up in the grid, and like the first race, rolled to the starting line from a standing start about 50 yards up the track. Howdy Wilcox took the lead at the start, and led for the first six laps. Johnny Aitken ran second, while Hughie Hughes was running fourth. Wilcox then made a pit stop to change two tires, handing the lead to Aitken. Wilcox lost a couple minutes in the pits, but still managed to finish the race in 6th place.

Two cars, Ralph DePalma and Art Klein, dropped out after 7 laps with dirty spark plugs. Klein was finished for the day, but DePalma would get his car ready for the 100-mile later in the afternoon.

Hughie Hughes became the story of the race, fiercely battling Aitken for the race lead. On lap 15, Hughes briefly took the lead, but on the backstretch Aitken was able to get back ahead. On the final lap, Hughes battled with Aitken for the win. Down the mainstretch, Aitken held off Hughes by 0.28 seconds at the finish line. The margin of victory was about four feet.

Winning his second race of the day, Aitken pocketed $700 for first place. Hughes won $500 for second. Louis Chevrolet, less than a second behind the first two cars, won $400 for third. Wilbur D'Alene received $300 for fourth, and Dave Lewis $100 for fifth.

Finish	No.	Driver	Car	Laps	Status
1	1	(United States) Johnny Aitken	Peugeot	20	32:40.33 (91.83 mph)
2	19	(United Kingdom) Hughie Hughes	Hoskins Special	20	+0.28
3	x	(United States) Louis Chevrolet	Sunbeam	20	+0.77
4	8	(United States) Wilbur D'Alene	Duesenberg	20	+45.52
5	6	(United States) Dave Lewis	Premier	20	+1:25.13
6	5	(United States) Howdy Wilcox	Premier	20	+2:44.56
7	14	(United States) George Buzane	Duesenberg	20	+2:52.54
8	18	(United States) Ralph DePalma	Peugeot	7	Dirty plugs
9	x	(United States) Art Klein	Kleinart	7	Dirty plugs

== 100 mile race ==
The third event of the day was the 100-mile AAA national championship race. George Buzane drew the pole position, and the field lined up in rows of four. A total of $9,000 in prize money was posted, to be divided among the top seven finishers. The pace car took the field around for one unscored lap, and the race was started.

Johnny Aitken picked up where he left off in the first two races, and took the lead on the first lap. He held the lead for the first 23 laps. Eddie Rickenbacker, who sat out the first two races, started deeper in the field, but was running second as quickly as lap 4. Aitken and Rickenbacker ran 1st-2nd for the first 50 miles, with Aitken never pulling more than 100 feet out in front. Rickenbacker stayed within a second of the lead on the scoring serials until he took the lead on lap 24.

Tommy Milton, who also skipped the first two races of the day, dropped out on lap 8 with ignition trouble. Howdy Wilcox later quit after completing only 8 laps. Rickenbacker's lead was short-lived, as Aitken was back in front on lap 25. With Aitken and Rickenbacker battling at the front of the field, another close battle was going on for third and fourth. Hughie Hughes and Wilbur D'Alene were running close together for much of the race. Dave Lewis, running 5th much of the day, was holding off George Buzane for the first half. Buzane moved into 5th by the 28th lap.

Ralph DePalma, Pete Henderson, Omar Toft traded 7th, 8th, and 9th place between one another most of the race. None of the three were factors in the race, and each were running at least a lap down at the checkered flag. With Wilcox and Milton out, Jay McNey was the last car running in the field, He would be flagged after completing 38 of the 40 laps.

The final ten laps came down to a battle of survival between Johnny Aitken and Eddie Rickenbacker. On lap 33, Rickenbacker took the lead, then Aitken led laps 34–35. On lap 36, the steering arm on the right wheel of Aitken's car broke, rendering his car almost undriveable. Rickenbacker assumed the lead. As Aitken slowed, quickly Rickenbacker was out to nearly a half-lap lead. But with two laps to go, the right rear wheel on Ricknenbacker's car was wobbling badly. Coming out of turn four, the wheel collapsed, sending the car out of control. The car careened back and forth, and came to rest on the inside of the track. Rickenbacker and his riding mechanic George Henderson were narrowly avoided by four other cars, but emerged uninjured.

Over the final few laps, with Rickenbacker now out, the race between DePalma, Henderson, and Toft became a battle to see who would finish in the money. DePalma fell from 7th to 9th over the final eight laps, while Toft moved up from 9th to 7th. With four laps to go, Toft led Henderson by only 1.22 seconds. All three cars moved up one spot when they completed more laps than Rickenbacker, and Toft beat Henderson to the line to finish 6th by 2.65 seconds. DePalma finished 8th, 29.17 seconds behind Henderson, and out of the money in all three races for the day.

Aitken took the lead for good when Rickenbacker crashed out. He nursed his car around the final three laps with only one wheel attached to the steering linkage. Despite the crippled machine, he crossed the line 19 seconds ahead of second place Hughie Hughes. Aitken, accompanied by riding mechanic Maurice Becker, swept all three races for the day.

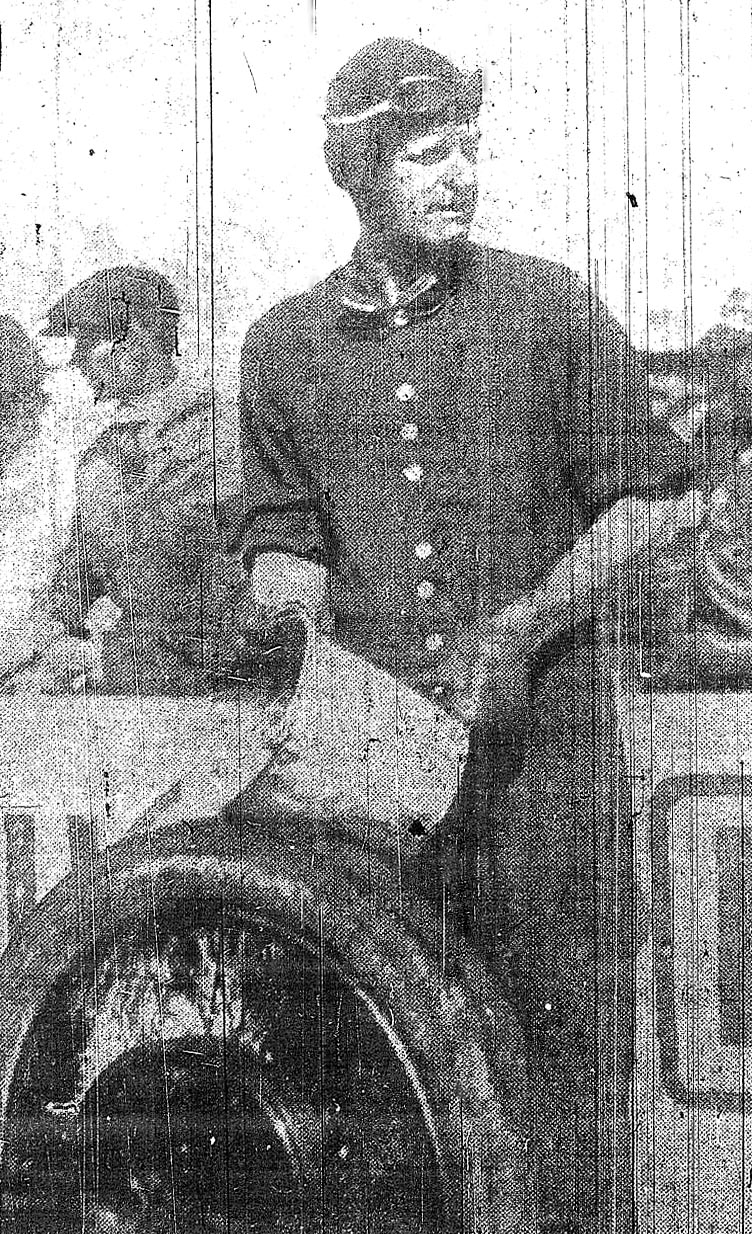
Johnny Aitken won all three races at the Harvest Auto Racing Classic.

Finish	No.	Driver	Car	Laps	Status
1	1	(United States) Johnny Aitken	Peugeot	40	1:07:05.04 (89.440 mph)
2	19	(United Kingdom) Hughie Hughes	Hoskins Special	40	+19.92
3	8	(United States) Wilbur D'Alene	Duesenberg	40	+38.69
4	14	(United States) George Buzane	Duesenberg	40	+1:32.62
5	6	(United States) Dave Lewis	Premier	40	+2:02.26
6	22	(United States) Omar Toft	Omar	40	+5:35.76
7	9	(Canada) Pete Henderson	Maxwell	40	+5:38.41
8	18	(United States) Ralph DePalma	Peugeot	40	+7:07.58
9	10	(United States) Eddie Rickenbacker	Maxwell	38	Crash turn 4
10	17	(United States) Jay McNey	Ostewig	36	Flagged
11	7	(United States) Tommy Milton	Ostewig	8	Ignition
12	5	(United States) Howdy Wilcox	Premier	8	Withdrew
13	x	(United States) Charles Devlin	Kleinart	0	Mechanical

=== Final statistics and legacy ===
Johnny Aitken won $3500 for first place in the 100-mile race, bringing his total for the day to $4600. Hughie Hughes won $2000, and Wilbur D'Alene won $1200 for third. Rounding out the cash prizes were polesitter George Buzane (4th) with $1000, Dave Lewis (5th) with $600, Omar Toft (6th) with $400, and Pete Henderson (7th) with $300. It would Aitken's final race at Indianapolis, after compiling an all-time track record of 15 total race wins, a record that still stands as of 2022. Later in the year, Aitken was credited as co-winner of the American Grand Prize race, but died in 1918 of bronchopneumonia from the Influenza pandemic of 1918.

On March 23, 1917, Speedway management cancelled the 1917 Indianapolis 500, and halted all racing at the facility during both 1917 and 1918. The track was offered as a landing strip and maintenance/refueling station for military aircraft traveling between Wilbur Wright Field and Chanute Air Force Base. It was referred to as the Speedway Aviation Repair Depot, and the 821st Aero Repair Squadron was stationed there.

The AAA National Championship was suspended in both 1917 and 1918. There were, however, AAA races (non-championship races) conducted during the war years at other tracks. The Indianapolis 500 resumed after the war in 1919, but the Harvest Auto Racing Classic was not held again.

== Legacy ==
During the 2018 and 2019 NASCAR Cup Series seasons, the Brickyard 400 was scheduled for the weekend where the Harvest Auto Racing Classic was conducted. Each of the two September editions of the Brickyard included an Xfinity and Cup Series race each, and a dirt track race, the Bryan Clauson Classic. All four races were moved to July in 2020.

On July 26, 2019, the SRO Motorsports Group announced that the Speedway will host a new road course event scheduled in October, the Intercontinental GT Challenge Indianapolis 8 Hour, along with the entire GT World Challenge America including TCR, GT3, and GT4 specification races. Following the coronavirus pandemic related cancellations, on April 6, 2020, INDYCAR announced the Nippon Telegraph and Telephone IndyCar Series 2020 schedule alternations will include a third weekend to the schedule (one road course race during NASCAR weekend and one oval weekend for the Indianapolis 500), the IndyCar Harvest GP, as a road course race. Originally scheduled for a single race October 3, due to continuing cancellations of other events on the schedule, it was changed to a doubleheader, with races run on October 2 and October 3. Its naming pays tribute to the Harvest Auto Racing Classic, and the race will serve as a support event for the inaugural Indianapolis 8 Hour on the Intercontinental GT Challenge circuit. It was the second road course race at IMS for the 2020 season accompanying the GMR Grand Prix. It was announced by the Stephane Ratel Organisation that the 8 Hours of Indianapolis will return in 2021, but the INDYCAR race will move to the NASCAR weekend in mid-August.

== Notes ==
=== See also ===
- 1916 Indianapolis 500
- 1916 AAA Championship Car season
- GMR Grand Prix

=== Works cited ===
- The First Super Speedway - Indianapolis Harvest Classic
- ChampCarStats.com - 1916 AAA National Championship Trail
- Dill, Mark; "A Forgotten Classic;" 2006 Allstate 400 at the Brickyard Official Program; Indianapolis Motor Speedway; 2006.
- Scott, D. Bruce; INDY: Racing Before the 500; Indiana Reflections; 2005; ISBN 0-9766149-0-1.
- Galpin, Darren; A Record of Motorsport Racing Before World War I.
