= Arthur Johnson =

Arthur Johnson may refer to:

== Sports ==
- Arthur Johnson (athletic director), athletic director for Temple Owls
- Arthur Johnson (boxer) (born 1966), U.S. Olympic boxer
- Arthur Johnson (rugby league), Widnes and Great Britain 1908/09 - 1922/23
- Arthur Johnson (footballer, born 1879) (1879–?), Anglo-Irish footballer and manager in the 1910s and 1920s
- Arthur Johnson (footballer, born 1886), English half back prior to the First World War
- Arthur Johnson (footballer, born 1903) (1903–1987), English footballer in the 1920s and early 1930s
- Arthur Johnson (footballer, born 1933), English goalkeeper in the 1950s and 1960s
- Arthur Johnson (canoeist) (born 1921), Canadian Olympic canoer in the 1950s
- Arthur Johnson (basketball) (born 1982), American basketball player
- Art Johnson (racing driver) (1884–1949), racing driver
- Art Johnson (1940s pitcher) (1919–2008), major league pitcher with the Boston Braves
- Art Johnson (1920s pitcher) (1897–1982), major league pitcher with the New York Giants
- Art Johnson (American football), American football player for the Duluth Kelleys in the 1920s

== Others ==
- Arte Johnson (1929–2019), American comic actor
- Arthur V. Johnson (1876–1916), actor and director in American silent films
- Arthur Johnson (historian) (1845–1927), English historian
- Arthur Johnson (bioengineer), American bioengineer, farmer, author, and academic
- Arthur Johnson (professor), Rawlinson and Bosworth Professor of Anglo-Saxon at the University of Oxford 1827–1829
- Arthur Johnson (musician), drummer and original member of Boston rock band Come
- Arthur Johnson, English watchmaker and originator of hybridisation of Hippeastrum
- Arthur L. Johnson (died 1955), educator in the U.S. state of New Jersey
- Arthur M. Johnson, American historian, see Beveridge Award
- Arthur Johnson (United States Army officer) (1861–1946)
- Arthur Johnson (banker) (1920–1991), Sierra Leonean banker, accountant, and governor of the Bank of Sierra Leone

== See also ==
- Arthur Johnston (disambiguation)
