= Arthur Johnston =

Arthur Johnston may refer to:

- Arthur Johnston (poet) (1579–1641), Scottish physician and poet
- Arthur Johnston (fl. 1877), British bell maker with Gillett & Johnston
- Arthur Johnston (cricketer) (1863–1929), English cricketer
- Arthur Johnston (composer) (1898–1954), American composer and songwriter
- Arthur Lawson Johnston, 3rd Baron Luke (1933–2015), British peer
- Arthur Johnston (politician) (born 1947), Canadian politician, member of the Legislative Assembly of Alberta
- Arthur Johnston (priest) (1866–1941), Irish Anglican priest
- Lt col. Arthur Johnston (1776-1824), Command of the expedition of Candy and officer of the Royal Corsican Rangers

== See also ==
- Arthur Johnson (disambiguation)
