= 1916 Indianapolis 500 =

American motor race

6th Indianapolis 500
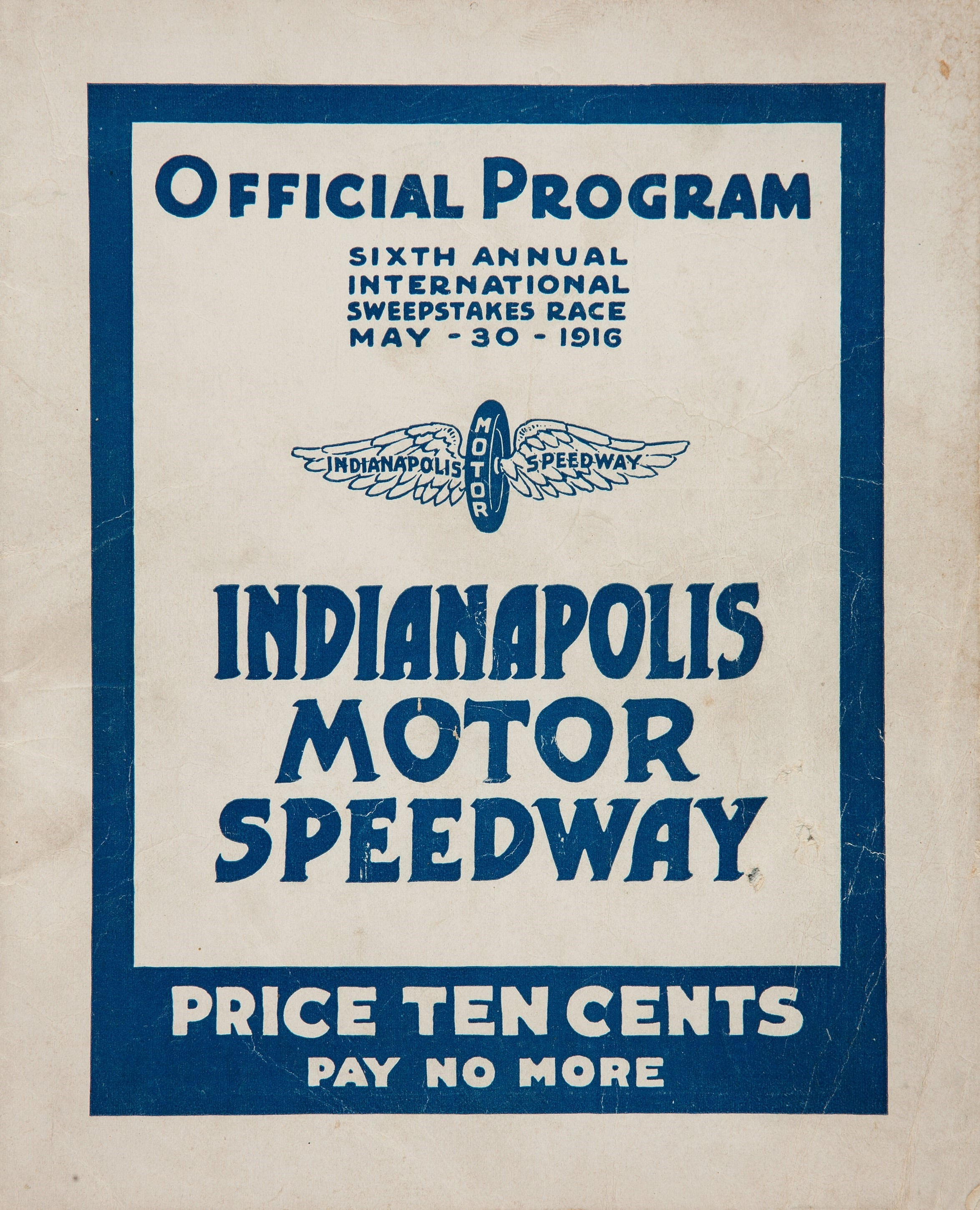

Indianapolis Motor Speedway

Indianapolis 500
- Sanctioning body: AAA
- Date: May 30, 1916
- Winner: Dario Resta
- Winning Riding Mechanic: Bob Dahnke
- Winning Entrant: Peugeot
- Winning time: 3:34:17
- Average speed: 84.001 mph (135.187 km/h)
- Pole position: Johnny Aitken
- Pole speed: 96.69 mph (155.61 km/h)
- Most laps led: Dario Resta (103)

Pre-race
- Pace car: Premier 6 (Model 6-56)
- Pace car driver: Frank E. Smith
- Starter: George M. Dickson
- Honorary referee: Howard Carpenter Marmon
- Estimated attendance: 83,000

Chronology
Previous	Next
1915	1919

The 6th International 300-Mile Sweepstakes Race was the sixth running of the Indianapolis 500. It was held at the Indianapolis Motor Speedway on Tuesday, May 30, 1916. The management scheduled the race for 120 laps, 300 miles (480 km), the only Indianapolis 500 scheduled for less than 500 miles (800 km).

Although the common belief is that the race distance was changed due to the onset of World War I, it was in fact Speedway management that changed the distance in an attempt to make the race shorter and more appealing to fans. Despite the one-time altered distance, the race is still considered part of the continuous lineage of the Memorial Day classic, known as the Indianapolis 500. In addition to the altered distance, the start time was moved from 10:00 a.m. to the early afternoon (1:30 p.m.)

Seven of the cars were entered by the Speedway or its owners, in order to ensure a strong field during the war. None of them finished in the top five. Despite the promoter's entries, the field consisted of only 21 cars, the smallest in Indy history. 1915 winner Ralph DePalma withheld his entry for 1916, demanding $5,000 in appearance money from Speedway management. Carl Fisher refused to accede to the demand, and DePalma's subsequent entry blank, filed after the deadline, was rejected.

Eddie Rickenbacker took the lead at the start, and led the first nine laps until dropping out with steering problems. Dario Resta led 103 of the 120 laps, and claimed the victory. Resta was accompanied by riding mechanic Bob Dahnke.

Three months after the 1916 race, on the weekend after Labor Day, the Speedway held a second event, with three short races as the Harvest Auto Racing Classic.

== World War I ==
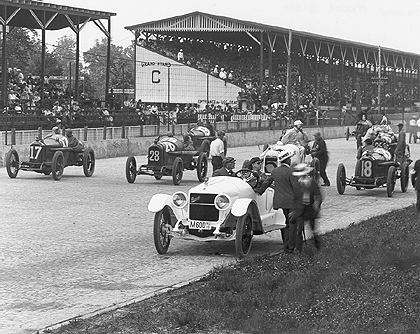

The 1917 race was scheduled to return to 500 miles, but a dispute with the local hoteliers and the escalation of World War I intervened. On March 23, 1917, Speedway management cancelled the 1917 Indianapolis 500, and halted racing at the facility for both 1917 and 1918.

The track was offered as a landing strip and maintenance/refueling station for military aircraft traveling between Wilbur Wright Field and Chanute Air Force Base. It was referred to as the Speedway Aviation Repair Depot, and the 821st Aero Repair Squadron was stationed there. In addition, several experimental aircraft were tested at the grounds. At least one test pilot was fatally injured in a plane crash at the track.

No racing of any kind took place at the Indianapolis Motor Speedway in 1917–1918. Likewise, the National Championship was suspended in both 1917 and 1918. There were, however, AAA races (non-championship races) conducted during the war years at other tracks. On Memorial Day 1917, a 250-mile race was held at Cincinnati.

The Indianapolis 500 resumed after the war in 1919.

== Starting grid ==
Row	Inside		Inside Center		Outside Center		Outside	
1	18	(United States) Johnny Aitken	5	(United States) Eddie Rickenbacker	28	(United States) Gil Andersen	17	(United Kingdom) Dario Resta
2	15	(United States) Barney Oldfield	29	(United States) Howdy Wilcox	27	(United States) Tom Rooney R	19	(United States) Charlie Merz
3	4	(Canada) Pete Henderson R	1	(United States) Wilbur D'Alene R	7	(United States) Arthur Chevrolet	21	(United States) Jules Devigne R
4	9	(United States) Ora Haibe R	14	(Belgium) Josef Christiaens	24	(United States) Billy Chandler	23	(United States) Aldo Franchi R
5	26	(United States) Art Johnson R	25	(United States) Dave Lewis R	12	(United States) Tom Alley	10	(United States) Ralph Mulford
6	8	(United States) Louis Chevrolet						

R Indianapolis 500 rookie

== Box score ==
1916 Indianapolis 500 winning car

Finish	Start	No	Name	Entrant	Chassis	Engine	Qual	Rank	Laps	Status
1	4	17	(United Kingdom) Dario Resta	Peugeot Auto Racing Company	Peugeot	Peugeot	94.400	4	120	84.00 mph
2	10	1	(United States) Wilbur D'Alene R	Duesenberg Brothers	Duesenberg	Duesenberg	90.870	11	120	+1:58
3	20	10	(United States) Ralph Mulford	Ralph Mulford	Peugeot	Peugeot	91.090	10	120	+3:39
4	14	14	(Belgium) Josef Christiaens	Sunbeam Motor Car Company	Sunbeam	Sunbeam	86.080	16	120	+12:19
5	5	15	(United States) Barney Oldfield	Barney Oldfield	Delage	Delage	94.330	5	120	+13:02
6	9	4	(Canada) Pete Henderson R (Eddie Rickenbacker Laps 52–120)	Prest-O-Lite Racing Team	Maxwell	Maxwell	91.330	9	120	+15:39
7	6	29	(United States) Howdy Wilcox (Gil Andersen)	Indianapolis Speedway Team Company	Premier	Premier	93.810	6	120	+20:37
8	17	26	(United States) Art Johnson R	William Chandler	Crawford	Duesenberg	83.690	19	120	+27:37
9	15	24	(United States) Billy Chandler (Frank Elliott)	William Chandler	Crawford	Duesenberg	84.840	17	120	+28:26
10	13	9	(United States) Ora Haibe R	S. Osteweg	Osteweg	Wisconsin	87.080	15	120	+28:53
11	19	12	(United States) Tom Alley	Ogren Motor Car Company	Duesenberg	Duesenberg	82.040	21	120	+30:30
12	21	8	(United States) Louis Chevrolet	Chevrolet Brothers	Frontenac	Frontenac	87.690	13	82	Rod
13	3	28	(United States) Gil Andersen	Indianapolis Speedway Team Company	Premier	Premier	95.940	3	75	Oil line
14	18	25	(United States) Dave Lewis R	William Chandler	Crawford	Duesenberg	83.120	20	71	Gas tank
15	1	18	(United States) Johnny Aitken	Indianapolis Speedway Team Company	Peugeot	Peugeot	96.690	1	69	Valve
16	12	21	(United States) Jules Devigne R (Jack LeCain)	Harry Harkness	Delage	Delage	87.170	14	61	Crash NC
17	7	27	(United States) Tom Rooney R	Indianapolis Speedway Team Company	Premier	Premier	93.390	7	48	Crash T1
18	11	7	(United States) Arthur Chevrolet	Chevrolet Brothers	Frontenac	Frontenac	87.740	12	35	Magneto
19	8	19	(United States) Charlie Merz	Indianapolis Speedway Team Company	Peugeot	Peugeot	93.330	8	25	Lubrication
20	2	5	(United States) Eddie Rickenbacker	Prest-O-Lite Racing Team	Maxwell	Maxwell	96.440	2	9	Steering
21	16	23	(United States) Aldo Franchi R	Aldo Franchi	Peugeot	Sunbeam	84.120	18	9	Engine trouble

Note: Relief drivers in parentheses

R Indianapolis 500 Rookie

=== Race statistics ===
Lap Leaders
Laps	Leader
1–9	Eddie Rickenbacker
10–17	Johnny Aitken
18–120	Dario Resta

Total laps led
Laps	Leader
Dario Resta	103
Eddie Rickenbacker	9
Johnny Aitken	8

== Race details ==
- For 1916, riding mechanics were required.
- In the weeks and months leading up to the race, Speedway president Carl G. Fisher had expressed concern and disdain over the local hoteliers' practice of price gouging customers during the race week. It reached a boiling point where Fisher threatened to move the 1916 and/or 1917 Memorial Day 500-mile race to a board track in Cincinnati, Ohio. Ultimately, a truce was reached, and the race(s) were not moved. Apropos to that, the 1917 Indianapolis 500 was cancelled anyway shortly after the entry blanks were mailed out, due to the escalation of World War I.
- Driver Jack LeCain was forced to miss the race due to a broken crankshaft suffered during a practice run two days before the race. He drove relief for Delage teammate Jules Devigne, taking over shortly beyond the 100-mile mark. After 61 laps, he suffered a serious crash, leaving him critically injured.

== Notes ==
=== Works cited ===
- "New Planes for Old" - The Work of the Aviation Repair Depots: Aerial Ace Weekely, 1 September 1919

=== References ===
1915 Indianapolis 500; Ralph DePalma	1916 Indianapolis 500; Dario Resta	1919 Indianapolis 500; Howdy Wilcox
