= Aldo Franchi =

American racing driver (1882–1958)

- Born: March 21, 1882 Milan, Lombardy, Italy
- Died: November 19, 1958 (aged 76) New York, New York, U.S.

Champ Car career
- 4 races run over 1 year
- First race: 1916 Metropolitan Trophy (Sheepshead Bay)
- Last race: 1916 International Sweepstakes (Sharonville)
Wins	Podiums	Poles
0	0	0

Aldo Franchi (March 21, 1882 – November 19, 1958) was an American racing driver.

== Biography ==
Born in Milan, Franchi later immigrated to the United States, settling in New York City. He primarily worked in the aviation industry, patenting various designs manufactured by Bendix.

== Motorsports career results ==
=== Indianapolis 500 results ===
Year	Car	Start	Qual	Rank	Finish	Laps	Led	Retired
1916	23	16	84.120	18	21	9	0	Engine trouble
Totals						9	0	

Starts	1
Poles	0
Front Row	0
Wins	0
Top 5	0
Top 10	0
Retired	1
