= Arthur Johnson (bioengineer) =

American bioengineer, farmer, author and academic

Arthur Thomas Johnson
- Born: February 21, 1941 (age 85); East Meadow, New York
- Occupations: Bioengineer, farmer, author and academic

Academic background
- Education: BAE., Agricultural Engineering; MS., Agricultural Engineering; PhD., Agricultural Engineering
- Alma mater: Cornell University

Arthur Thomas Johnson is an American bioengineer, farmer, author, and academic. He is a professor emeritus of bioengineering at the University of Maryland, College Park, and operates his family farm, SweetAire Farm, in Darlington, Maryland.

Johnson's research focuses on human performance with respirators, biomechanics, instrumentation, transport processes, bioengineering instruction, and the development of the Airflow Perturbation Device for measuring respiratory resistance. His publications comprise journal articles and five books, including Biomechanics and Exercise Physiology, Biological Process Engineering, Biology for Engineers, Greetings from SweetAire Farm, and Design of Biomedical Devices and Systems. He is the recipient of the 1992 Excellence in Teaching Materials Award and the 2012 Theo Pilkington Outstanding Educator Award from the American Society for Engineering Education, along with the Institute of Biological Engineering's Brahm and Sudha Verma Lifetime Visionary Award in 2008, and the 2020 Cyrus Hall McCormick-Jerome Increase Case Gold Medal from the American Society of Agricultural and Biological Engineers.

Johnson is a Founding Fellow of the American Institute for Medical and Biological Engineering and a Life Fellow of the American Society for Engineering Education, the American Society for Agricultural and Biological Engineers, as well as the Institute for Electrical and Electronics Engineers. He is also a Fellow of the American Industrial Hygiene Association and the Biomedical Engineering Society.

== Education and early career ==
Johnson earned a bachelor's degree in Agricultural Engineering in 1964, followed by a master's in 1967 and a PhD in 1969, all from Cornell University. He then joined the U.S. Army as an officer, serving in Vietnam at the rank of captain and receiving the Army Commendation Medal and Bronze Star Medal.

== Career ==
Johnson began his academic career at the University of Maryland, College Park in 1975, became Professor in 1986, and has held the title of professor emeritus since 2009. He was involved with the American Institute for Medical and Biological Engineering (AIMBE) for several years, where he cochaired the committee that established the organization from 1988 to 1992 and assumed the position of executive director in 2004. Concurrently, from 1984 to 1988, he served as President of the Alliance for Engineering in Medicine and Biology. In 1988, he was elected President of the Institute for Biological Engineering and subsequently held leadership positions at the International Society for Respiratory Protection as president from 2004 to 2006 and at the Biomedical Engineering Society as Secretary from 2004 to 2009.

At the University of Maryland, Johnson contributed to the teaching of Biological Engineering undergraduate and graduate subjects. The topics of his university courses ranged from microcomputers and programming to the design of electronic circuits, to the design of transport processes systems, to biology for engineers. He wrote textbooks for some of these (Biological Process Engineering, Biomechanics and Exercise Physiology, and Biology for Engineers).

Johnson has contributed to the development of SweetAire Farm. As the founder of the Darlington Apple Festival, he has been involved in organizing and promoting the event since 1986, serving as chairman of the organizing committee for its first eight years. He has sent out weekly SweetAire Farm email messages, providing updates on farm operations and available produce. In 2022, he compiled these messages into Greetings from SweetAire Farm: A Lifetime of Stories.

== Works ==
Johnson's work has encompassed respiratory mechanics and measurement, human performance while wearing respiratory protective masks, transport processes, and the development of the Airflow Perturbation Device for noninvasive respiratory resistance measurement, and he holds multiple patents for his contributions. He has published five books on biomechanics, biomedical devices, and engineering. His first book, Biological Process Engineering: An Analogical Approach to Fluid Flow, Heat Transfer, and Mass Transfer Applied to Biological Systems (1998), was described by M. J. Morley as "a well-written, reader-friendly book which presents transport phenomena in biological systems in clear, simple, practical terms." He later published the textbooks Biomechanics and Exercise Physiology: Quantitative Modeling (2007) and Biology for Engineers (2010), which focus on engineering applications of biomechanics, physiology, and biology while emphasizing quantitative analysis. In 2015, he co-authored Design of Biomedical Devices and Systems with Paul H. King and Richard C. Fries, and Gail D. Baura called it "well written and comprehensive."

Johnson has written essays on different topics including veterans' stories, the use of commas, three-letter acronyms, ethics, and consciousness in artificial intelligence (AI) systems, poetic instructions for course final examinations, the afterlife, the value of diverse experiences, and social relationships.

=== Airflow perturbation device ===
Johnson invented and contributed to the development and validation of the Airflow Perturbation Device (APD), a portable tool for measuring respiratory resistance. Comparing the APD with traditional pulmonary function tests (PFTs), he discovered that the APD accurately detected changes in respiratory resistance, indicating a strong correlation with forced expiratory volume and peak flow measurements. His work further extended to evaluating the APD's use in detecting nasal congestion's effects on respiratory resistance, where it exhibited comparable results to more invasive methods like impulse oscillometry He also conducted research comparing the APD to esophageal balloon techniques in assessing airway resistance during exercise. In pediatric populations, he revealed the APD's ability to analyze respiratory function in non-cooperative children and in cases of paradoxical vocal fold motion.

=== Biomechanics ===
Johnson's research in biomechanics has examined respiratory mechanics, airway resistance, and human performance. In a paper on airway resistance variability, he and his colleagues analyzed respiratory resistance measurements using the Airflow Perturbation Device (APD), finding that resistance followed a distribution consistent with an optimized physiological process. His work on maximum inspiratory and expiratory pressures established regression equations describing pressure changes across lung volumes. He has also investigated the metabolic cost of respiration, modeling how factors like lung volume, exhalation flow limitation, and respiratory protective equipment influence respiratory workload. In addition, by modeling exercise-induced pulmonary hemorrhage in racing thoroughbreds, he determined that inhalation pressures during exercise can lead to capillary rupture in the lungs. He conducted research on lower leg high-intensity resistance training, revealing that blood flow to the calf muscles can be limited after training, indicating changes in hemodynamics associated with muscle hypertrophy. He has contributed to the application of biomechanics in agriculture, analyzing mechanical harvesting, product processing, and human biomechanics to improve agricultural productivity.

=== Instrumentation ===
Continuing his work on the airflow perturbation device, Johnson demonstrated that the device's measurements closely aligned with other experimental data and correctly reflected changes in airflow rate and direction in both human and animal subjects. He also showed the APD to be suitable for noninvasive applications in respirator research and medical surveillance, particularly for diagnosing respiratory conditions and monitoring the effects of airborne contaminants. His research extended into the application of the APD in animal studies, where he emphasized its effectiveness in diagnosing respiratory disorders in livestock.

In addition to respiratory measurement, Johnson explored digital and analog circuits used in biomedical data processing. In his 1985 paper, he developed a program for designing digital filters, to remove noise from respiratory waveform data and enhance the accuracy of medical measurements. Furthermore, he addressed the challenge of storing physiological signals in sample-and-hold circuits for extended periods, displaying minimal voltage drift, making it suitable for long-term biological data monitoring.

=== Respirator masks ===
Johnson has conducted research on the physiological and performance effects of respirator masks, particularly in occupational and military contexts. His studies have examined how masks influence oxygen uptake, respiratory effort, and metabolic function during exercise, highlighting the role of mask resistance in altering ventilation patterns and increasing blood lactate accumulation. He has also contributed to understanding the interaction between respiratory and thermal stress, demonstrating how protective equipment can impact endurance and overall performance.

Beyond respiratory mechanics, Johnson has investigated the impact of respirator masks on visual acuity and task performance. His studies have shown that vision impairment due to fogging or clouded lenses significantly affects tasks requiring precision, such as hand-eye coordination and monitoring activities. To address these limitations, he has developed performance rating tables (PRTs) that assess mask effectiveness under various environmental conditions and intensities.

=== Transport processes ===
Johnson's work on transport processes has spanned heat transfer, fluid dynamics, and gas diffusion, particularly in agricultural and engineering applications. His studies on mixed convection, including experimental and numerical analyses, have examined heat transfer from spheres and cylinders, demonstrating that opposing, cross, and aiding flow regions behave differently. In collaboration with Tang and Ohadi, he focused on refrigerant condensation, investigating HCFC-22, HFC-134a, and HFC-410A in smooth and micro-fin tubes, leading to the development of a modified Shah equation that addressed performance discrepancies for HFC-410A. Looking into gas diffusion in potato tissue, he observed that diffusion coefficients for CO, CO₂, and SO₂ remained consistent across temperature and pressure variations but were significantly affected by sample thickness. Additionally, his research on solar collector tilt angles produced regression-based equations for optimizing energy efficiency across different geographic locations.

== Awards and honors ==
- 1970 – Army Commendation Medal, U.S. Army
- 1971 – Bronze Star Medal, U.S. Army
- 1992 – Excellence in Teaching Materials Award, American Society for Engineering Education
- 1992 – Founding Fellow, American Institute for Medical and Biological Engineering
- 1996 – Life Fellow, American Society for Engineering Education
- 2001 – Apple of Our Eye Award, Darlington Apple Festival
- 2002 – Life Fellow, American Society for Agricultural and Biological Engineers
- 2005 – Fellow, American Industrial Hygiene Association
- 2005 – Fellow, Biomedical Engineering Society
- 2008 – Brahm and Sudha Verma Lifetime Visionary Award, Institute of Biological Engineering
- 2009 – Life Fellow, Institute for Biological Engineering
- 2010 – Life Fellow, Institute for Electrical and Electronics Engineers
- 2012 – Theo Pilkington Outstanding Educator Award, American Society for Engineering Education
- 2020 – Cyrus Hall McCormick-Jerome Increase Case Gold Medal, American Society of Agricultural and Biological Engineers

== Bibliography ==
=== Books ===
- Biological Process Engineering: An Analogical Approach to Fluid Flow, Heat Transfer, and Mass Transfer Applied to Biological Systems (1998) ISBN 978-0-471-24547-6
- Biomechanics and Exercise Physiology: Quantitative Modeling (2007) ISBN 978-1-5744-4906-8
- Biology for Engineers (2010) ISBN 978-1-4200-7763-6
- Design of Biomedical Devices and Systems (2015) ISBN 978-1-4665-6913-3
- Greetings from SweetAire Farm: A Lifetime of Stories (2022) ISBN 978-1-6393-7031-3

=== Selected articles ===
- Johnson, A. T., Scott, W. H., Lausted, C. G., Benjamin, M. B., Coyne, K. M., Sahota, M. S., & Johnson, M. M. (1999). Effect of respirator inspiratory resistance level on constant load treadmill work performance. American Industrial Hygiene Association journal, 60(4), 474–479.
- Johnson, A. T., Scott, W. H., Lausted, C. G., Coyne, K. M., Sahota, M. S., & Johnson, M. M. (2000). Effect of external dead volume on performance while wearing a respirator. AIHAJ-American Industrial Hygiene Association, 61(5), 678–684.
- Johnson, A. T., Benjamin, M. B., & Silverman, N. (2002). Oxygen consumption, heat production, and muscular efficiency during uphill and downhill walking. Applied Ergonomics, 33(5), 485–491.
- Lausted, C. G., Johnson, A. T., Scott, W. H., Johnson, M. M., Coyne, K. M., & Coursey, D. C. (2006). Maximum static inspiratory and expiratory pressures with different lung volumes. Biomedical engineering online, 5, 1–6.
- Johnson, A. T. (2016). Respirator masks protect health but impact performance: a review. Journal of biological engineering, 10, 1–12.
