= Tom Rooney (racing driver) =

American racing driver (1881–1939)

- Born: Thomas Anthony Rooney; November 30, 1881 Waltham, Massachusetts, U.S.
- Died: February 5, 1939 (aged 57) Plainfield, Indiana, U.S.

Champ Car career
- 3 races run over 3 years
- First race: 1912 Pabst Blue Ribbon Trophy (Wauwatosa)
- Last race: 1916 Indianapolis 500 (Indianapolis)
Wins	Podiums	Poles
0	1	0

Thomas Anthony Rooney (November 30, 1881 – February 5, 1939) was an American racing driver. He made three AAA Championship Car race starts between 1912 and 1916, including the 1916 Indianapolis 500. He also raced production cars and was a factory superintendent for the car company ReVere. He entered the 1920 Indianapolis 500 but his entry was declined as he failed his race physical due to previous racing injuries. His best Championship race finish was second place on the board oval at Sheepshead Bay Race Track.

== Motorsports career results ==
=== Indianapolis 500 results ===
Year	Car	Start	Qual	Rank	Finish	Laps	Led	Retired
1916	27	7	93.390	7	17	48	0	Crash T1
Totals						48	0	

Starts	1
Poles	0
Front Row	0
Wins	0
Top 5	0
Top 10	0
Retired	1
