= Art Johnson (racing driver) =

American racing driver (1888–1949)

- Born: Arthur Hurst Johnson; June 16, 1888 Provincetown, Massachusetts, U.S.
- Died: August 27, 1949 (aged 61) Dothan, Alabama, U.S.

Champ Car career
- 4 races run over 1 year
- Best finish: 41st (tie) (1916)
- First race: 1916 Indianapolis 500 (Indianapolis)
- Last race: 1916 Montamarathon/Potlach; Trophy (Tacoma)
Wins	Podiums	Poles
0	0	0

Arthur Hurst Johnson (June 16, 1888 – August 27, 1949) was an American racing driver.

== Motorsports career results ==
=== Indianapolis 500 results ===
Year	Car	Start	Qual	Rank	Finish	Laps	Led	Retired
1916	26	17	83.690	19	8	120	0	Running
Totals						120	0	

Starts	1
Poles	0
Front Row	0
Wins	0
Top 5	0
Top 10	1
Retired	0
