= Jules Devigne =

American racing driver (1873–1935)

- Born: February 22, 1873 Le Havre, Seine-Inférieure, France
- Died: December 22, 1935 (aged 62) Hawthorne, New Jersey, U.S.

Champ Car career
- 7 races run over 2 years
- Best finish: 16th (tie) (1916)
- First race: 1916 Metropolitan Trophy (Sheepshead Bay)
- Last race: 1917 Harkness Trophy (Sheepshead Bay)
Wins	Podiums	Poles
0	1	0

Jules Devigne (February 22, 1873 – December 22, 1935) was an American racing driver.

== Biography ==
Devigne was born in Le Havre, later immigrating to the United States, where he obtained U.S. citizenship. In addition to his brief racing career, he worked as an auto mechanic.

== Motorsports career results ==
=== Indianapolis 500 results ===
Year	Car	Start	Qual	Rank	Finish	Laps	Led	Retired
1916	21	12	87.170	14	16	61	0	Crash NC
Totals						61	0	

Starts	1
Poles	0
Front Row	0
Wins	0
Top 5	0
Top 10	0
Retired	1
