= Arthur Chevrolet =

American racing driver (1884–1946)

- Born: April 25, 1884 La Chaux-de-Fonds, Neuchâtel, Switzerland
- Died: April 16, 1946 (aged 61) Slidell, Louisiana, U.S.

Champ Car career
- 6 races run over 4 years
- First race: 1910 Wheeler-Schebler Trophy (Indianapolis)
- Last race: 1916 Indianapolis 500 (Indianapolis)
Wins	Podiums	Poles
0	0	0

Arthur Chevrolet (April 25, 1884 – April 16, 1946) was an American racing driver and automobile manufacturer.

== Biography ==
Born in La Chaux-de-Fonds, Canton of Neuchâtel, Switzerland, Arthur was the middle brother of Louis Chevrolet (1878–1941), founder of the Chevrolet car company; and Gaston Chevrolet (1892–1920). After brother Louis emigrated to America and earned enough money, he sent for Gaston and Arthur to join him. Once there, Arthur worked as an automotive mechanic and joined his brothers in auto racing. In 1911, he competed in the inaugural Indianapolis 500 but had to drop out after 30 laps when his Buick developed mechanical problems.

In 1916, the year after Louis left the Chevrolet car company that he had co-founded, Arthur Chevrolet assisted Louis and Gaston in the new Frontenac Motor Corporation.

Driving a Frontenac, Chevrolet qualified for the Indianapolis 500 again in 1916, but was forced out after 35 laps when the car developed ignition magneto problems. His driving career ended during practice rounds for the 1920 Indianapolis 500 when he was severely injured in a crash. Brother Gaston won that year's race in a Frontenac, but Gaston was killed in a California race a few months later.

In 1928, Chevrolet filed with the US Patent Office for an 'Overhead Valve Engine'. Patent #1,744,526 was awarded on January 21, 1930.

In 1929, Arthur and Louis Chevrolet left the auto business altogether to form the Chevrolet Brothers Aircraft Company with a new engine of their design (Chevrolair). The business was unsuccessful and was eventually taken over by investors. Arthur and Louis returned to automobiles, becoming pioneer leaders in the development of sprint type race cars. In 1990, Arthur and his brother were inducted to the inaugural class of the National Sprint Car Hall of Fame & Museum.

In 1942, Chevrolet retired to Slidell, Louisiana. Suffering from depression, he committed suicide by hanging in 1946, only nine days shy of his 62nd birthday.

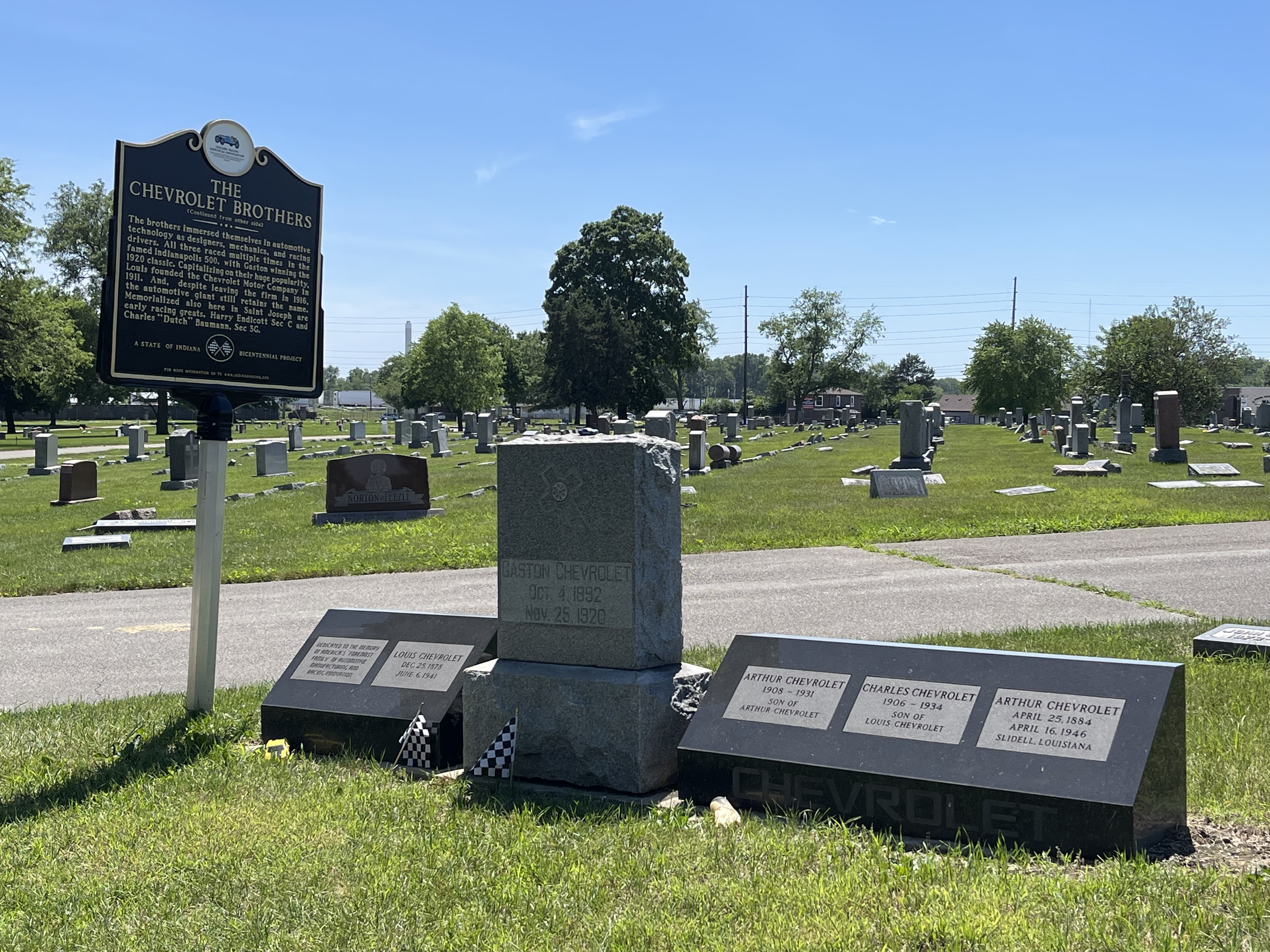
The gravesite of the Chevrolet brothers, including a gravestone for Arthur, at Holy Cross and Saint Joseph Cemetery, Indianapolis, Indiana

Chevrolet was thought to be interred next to his brothers in the Holy Cross and Saint Joseph Cemetery in Indianapolis, Indiana. A headstone was placed at the grave in 2011 to memorialize his life by the Indianapolis Motor Speedway on the 100th anniversary of the founding of the Chevrolet Motor Company. The St. Tammany News (which ceased operations in early 2013) revealed in a series of articles in late August 2012 that Arthur was not buried in Holy Cross and Saint Joseph Cemetery as previously believed but is most likely in a lost and unmarked grave in Our Lady of Lourdes Cemetery in the city where he died: Slidell, Louisiana. His gravestone was moved from Indianapolis to Our Lady of Lourdes Cemetery. The grave thought to be that of Arthur Chevrolet for many years is in fact his son, Arthur Chevrolet Jr. who died at 23 years old in November 1931, 15 years prior to Arthur Sr. death.

== Motorsports career results ==
=== Indianapolis 500 results ===
Year	Car	Start	Qual	Rank	Finish	Laps	Led	Retired
1911	16	14	—	—	36	30	0	Mechanical
1916	7	11	87.740	12	18	35	0	Magneto
Totals						65	0	

Starts	2
Poles	0
Front Row	0
Wins	0
Top 5	0
Top 10	0
Retired	2
