= Josef Christiaens =

Belgian racing driver (1882–1919)

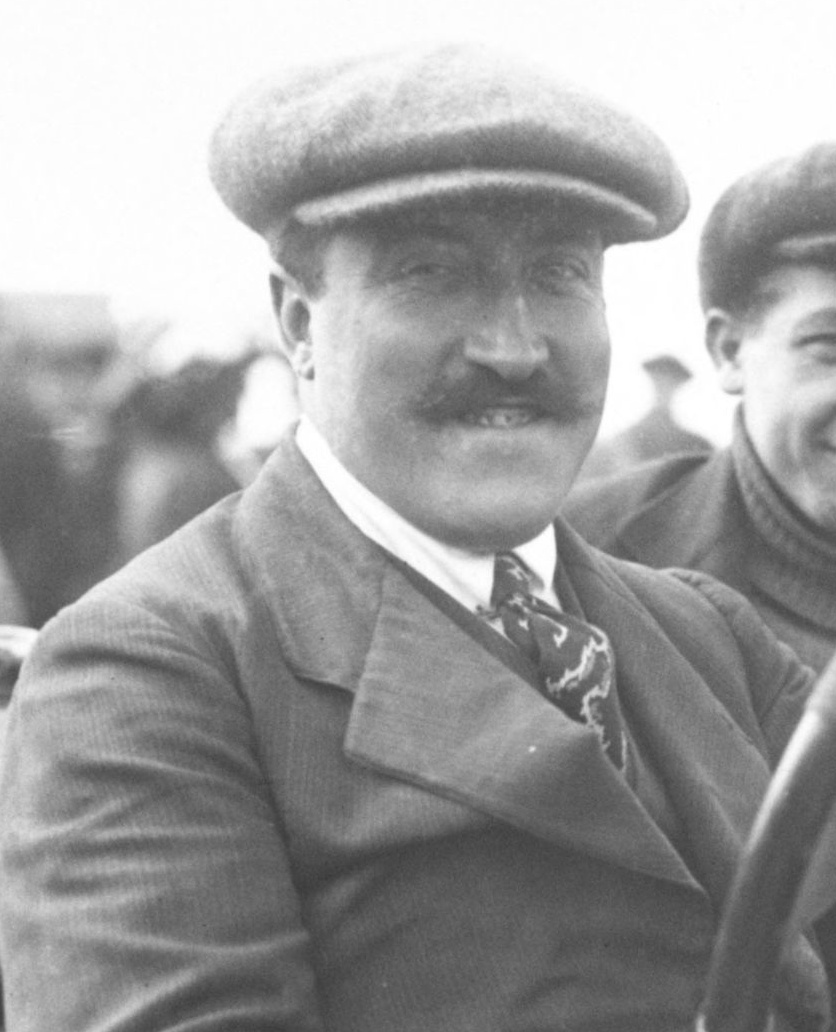
- Christiaens at the 1912 French Grand Prix
- Born: Josef Henri Charles Christiaens; 16 June 1882 Saint-Josse-ten-Noode, Brussels, Belgium
- Died: 25 February 1919 (aged 36) Wolverhampton, Staffordshire, England

Champ Car career
- 6 races run over 2 years
- Best finish: 12th (tie) (1916)
- First race: 1914 Indianapolis 500 (Indianapolis)
- Last race: 1916 Astor Cup (Sheepshead Bay)
Wins	Podiums	Poles
0	2	0

Josef Henri Charles Christiaens (occasionally anglicized as Joseph, 16 June 1882 – 25 February 1919), was a Belgian racing driver, aviator, and engineer.

== Biography ==
Christiaens was born in Saint-Josse-ten-Noode on 16 June 1882 to a prosperous Belgian family. On 13 August 1905 he participated in the Coupe de Liedekerke et Williame race held near Dinant, Belgium. The race spanned 102.740 km, but Christiaens failed to complete the race. He also failed to qualify for the Il Coupe de Normandie with his Vivinus 6 racecar on 29 August 1909. The Vivinus later gave Christiaens his first victory, winning the 2nd Coupe de Liedekerke et Williame in Ostend, Belgium on 13 September 1909. He went on to take a string of victories in Europe and in the U.S.

On 9 September 1916, Christiaens and his 2,300 lb (1,000 kg) English Sunbeam racecar, entered in the Harvest Auto Racing Classic held at the Indianapolis Motor Speedway, composing of three races held at 20, 50 and 100-mile distances. Johnny Aitken, in a Peugeot, came in first in all three distances. Christiaens' Sunbeam failed to start the race due to a broken crankshaft.

When Henri Farman flew the Voisin-designed biplane and took Ernest Archdeacon for a 1241-metre flight at Ghent, Belgium on 30 May 1908, Christiaens was immediately captivated and inspired by the spirit of flying.

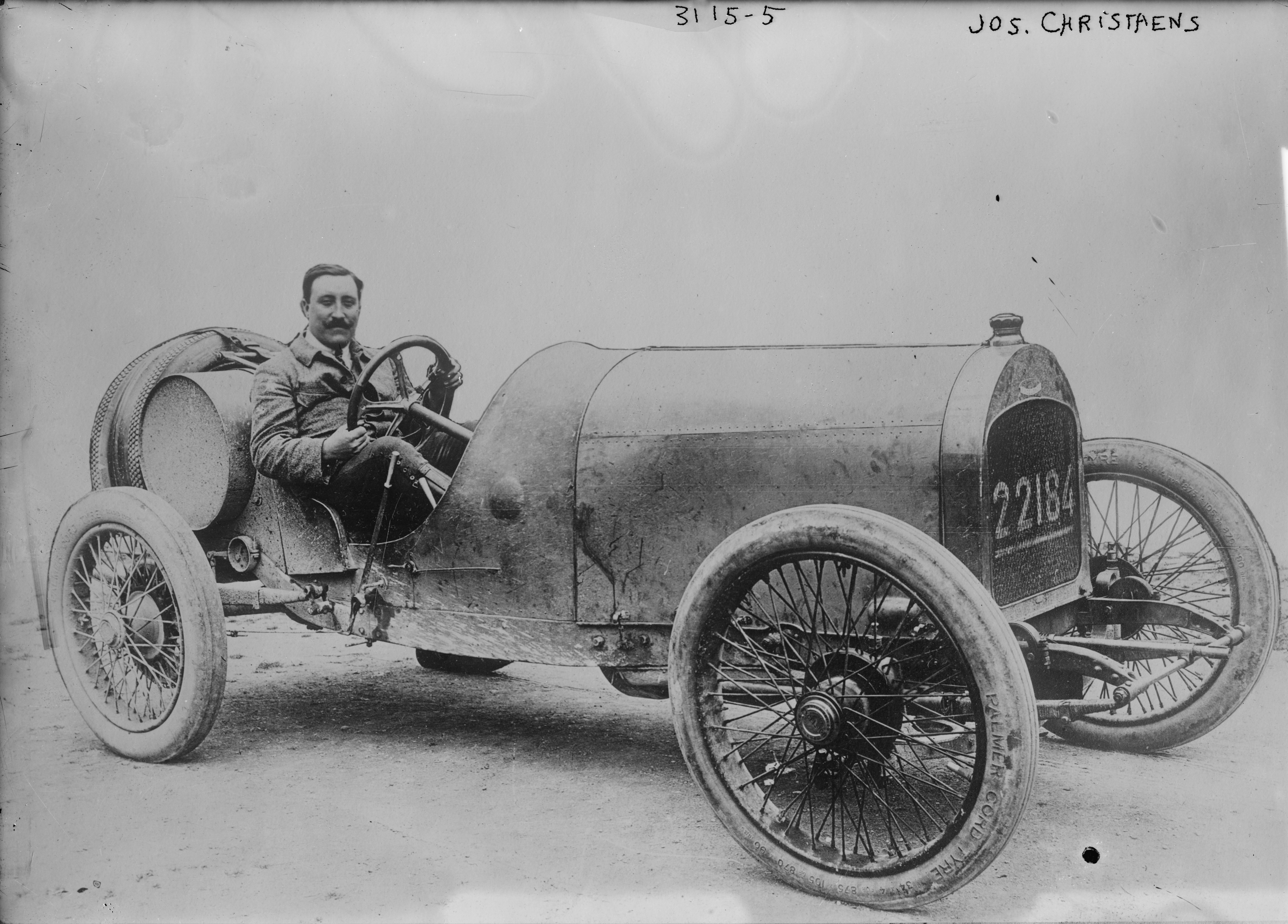
Christiaens at the 1914 Indianapolis 500

In March 1910 Christiaens met Géo Chavez at Camp de Châlons, France and learnt to fly on a Farman plane from him. By 12 April in the same year, he was registered with licence N°7, becoming one of the first 11 pilots registered at the Aéro-Club de Belgique (Aero Club of Belgium).

On 14 March 1911, Christiaens received much enthusiasm and assistance from the British Colonial Government in Singapore. A squad of Royal Engineers soldiers were dispatched to assemble and test the Bristol Boxkite. On 16 March 1911 Christiaens made history in Singapore as the first man to fly an airplane on the island.

Christiaens died in a road accident while performing a test drive on a Sunbeam racecar near Moorfield Works on 25 February 1919 in Wolverhampton, Staffordshire, England. Shortly after leaving the Works, his car crashed into a wall along Upper Villiers Street trying to avoid a horse-cart coming out of Fowler Street.

== Motorsports career results ==
=== Indianapolis 500 results ===
Year	Car	Start	Qual	Rank	Finish	Laps	Led	Retired
1914	9	7	91.210	9	6	200	9	Running
1916	14	14	86.080	16	4	120	0	Running
Totals						320	9	

Starts	2
Poles	0
Front Row	0
Wins	0
Top 5	1
Top 10	2
Retired	0
