= Dagmar (automobile) =

Sport model of Crawford (1922-27)

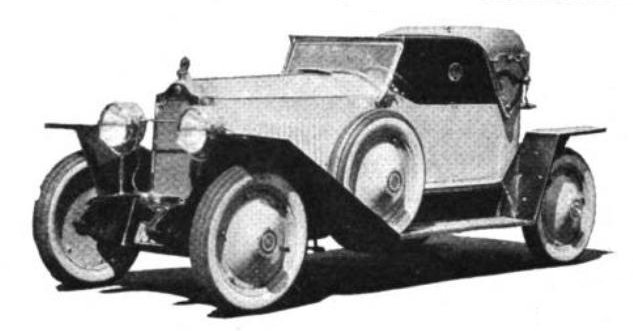
1923 Dagmar

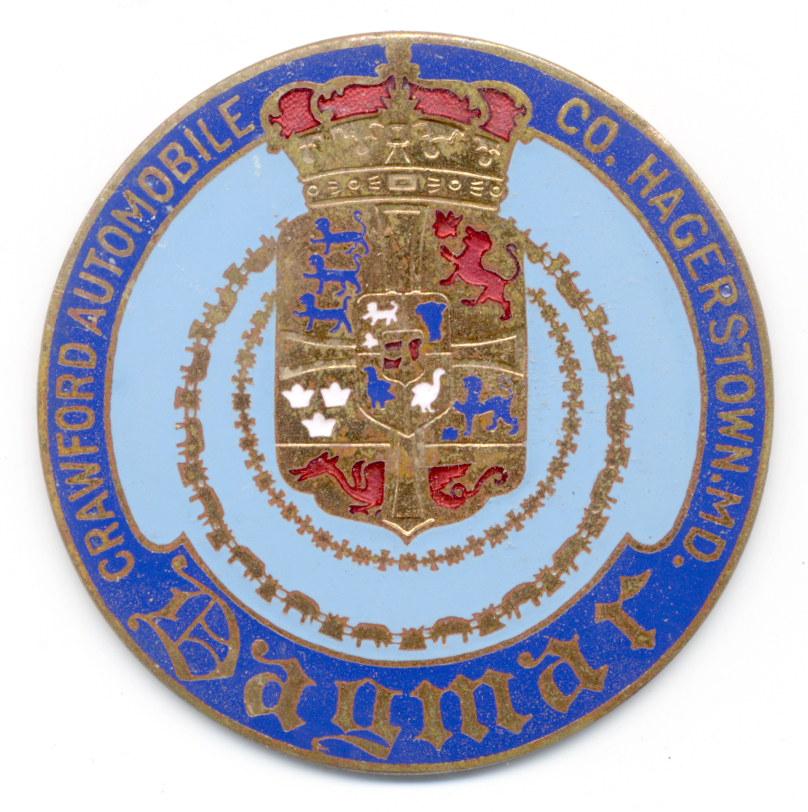
The radiator emblem from a Crawford Dagmar

The Dagmar was a sports version of the Crawford Automobile, made in Hagerstown, Maryland from 1922 to 1927 by the Crawford Automobile Company following their purchase by the M. P. Moller Pipe Organ Co. Several hundred Dagmars were produced. The Dagmar was considered one of the sportiest-looking cars of its day, featuring disc-covered artillery wheels, brass trim, and straight 'military' wings. They were usually painted in pastels. Two sizes of cars were produced, using six-cylinder engines produced by either Continental or Lycoming. The make later served as a base model for the Standish automobile and the Luxor taxicab.

The car was named for its maker's daughter, Mary Dagmar Moeller.

== See also ==
- List of defunct automobile manufacturers
