= Arthur Johnston (cricketer) =

English cricketer

Personal information
- Full name: Arthur Sannox Johnston
- Born: 16 March 1863; Hornsey, Middlesex, England
- Died: 8 August 1929 (aged 66); Eltham, London, England
- Batting: Right-handed
- Bowling: Right-arm medium
- Role: Batsman

Domestic team information
- Years: Team
- 1886–1887: Middlesex
- 1890–1896: Essex

Career statistics
Competition	First-class
Matches	10
Runs scored	259
Batting average	16.18
100s/50s	0/1
Top score	63
Catches/stumpings	5/–
- Source: Cricinfo, 27 July 2013

Arthur Sannox Johnston (16 March 1863 – 8 August 1929) was an English sportsman who played county cricket and rugby union.

Johnston was born at Hornsey in Middlesex in 1863 and educated at Mill Hill School. He played for Middlesex between 1886 and 1887 and for Essex between 1890 and 1896. He played three first-class cricket matches for Middlesex, two in 1886 and one in 1887, before playing for Essex between 1889 and 1896, his name appearing on scorecards at least once as EN Annan. Described by James Lillywhite as "an exceedingly good bat" and "a capital field", Johnston scored 259 first-class runs and made seven first-class appearances for Essex after the club was promoted to first-class status in 1894. His highest first-class score, and only half-century, came in an 1895 match against Yorkshire, with Johnston scoring 63 runs, the highest score in a low-scoring match.

A club cricketer with Hampstead, Johnson was also a rugby footballer. He played cricket at Hampstead alongside Andrew Stoddart who recruited him to play for Blackheath FC, one of the leading rugby sides at the time. He also played rugby for the South of England.

Professionally Johnston worked at the London Corn Exchange. He lived at Wanstead and died at Well Hall in Eltham in 1929. He was aged 66.

== Bibliography ==
- Pracy D (2023) Gentlemen and players of Essex: the amateur and professional cricketers of Essex County Cricket Club, 1876–1979. (Available online at The Association of Cricket Statisticians and Historians. Retrieved 11 June 2025.)
