= Institute of Biological Engineering =

The Institute of Biological Engineering or IBE is a non-profit professional organization which encourages inquiry and interest in the field of biological engineering.

== Overview ==
IBE promotes the view that biological engineering is a science-based, application-independent discipline that is aligned with the perspective and foundation of biology. IBE espouses the view that biological engineers should possess the scientific knowledge of biology, including its philosophical views, be proficient in the principles and practices of engineering, and be capable of integrating discoveries from multiple disciplines to design sustainable solutions.

IBE supports:

- Scholarship in education, research and service.
- Professional standards for engineering practices.
- Professional and technical development of biological engineering.
- Interactions among academia, industry and government.
- Public understanding and responsible uses of biological engineering products.

Through publications, meetings, distribution of information and services, IBE encourages:

- Cooperation among engineers, scientists, technologists and allied professionals.
- Timely availability of new knowledge and technology.
- Collaboration in education, research and economic activities worldwide
- Active promotion and growth of its members.

== History ==
The IBE was established in 1995 to encourage inquiry and interest in biological engineering in the broadest and most liberal manner and promote the professional development of its members. The organization was proposed on May 20, 1995 by ten individuals who met in Atlanta, Georgia to discuss the creation of a new professional organization and who became the first council of IBE: Susan Blanchard, Susan Capps, Mike Delwiche, Mark Eiteman, Kathrine Flechter, Belinda Roettger, Jonathan Scott, Tim Taylor, John Henry Wells, and Brahm Verma, who served as the first president of IBE. The first annual meeting of IBE was held July 13–15, 1996 in Phoenix, Arizona.
