= Crawford Automobile =

Defunct American motor vehicle manufacturer

Crawford Automobile Company
- Type: Automobile manufacturing
- Industry: Automotive
- Genre: Touring cars
- Founded: 1905; 121 years ago
- Defunct: 1923; 103 years ago
- Fate: Bought by M. P. Moller
- Headquarters: Hagerstown, Maryland, United States
- Area served: United States
- Products: Vehicles; Automotive parts

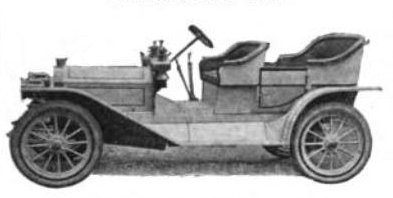
1909 Crawford Model H Light Touring Car

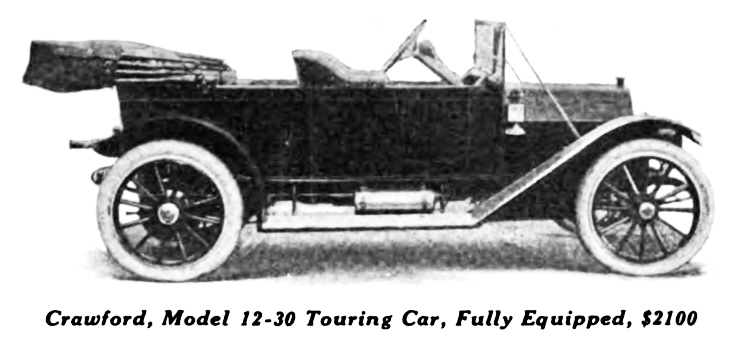
Crawford Model 12-30 (1912)

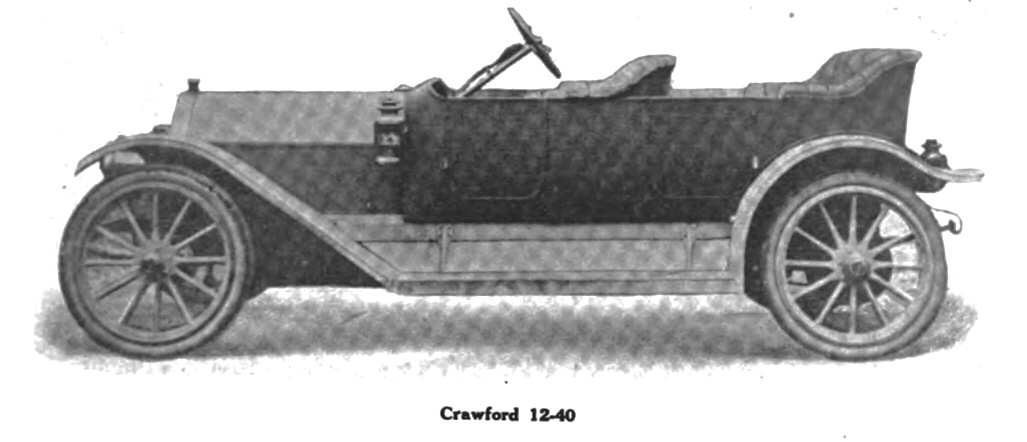
Crawford 12-40 (1912)

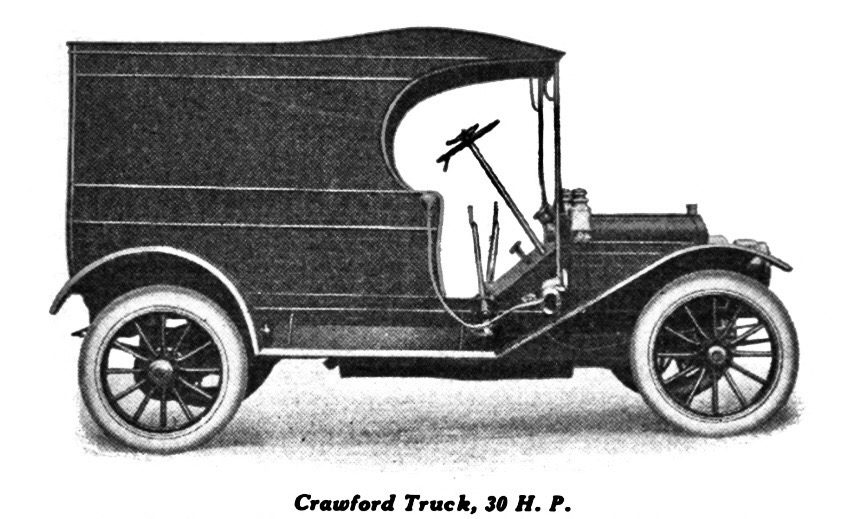
Crawford delivery van (1912)

Crawford Model 13-45 advertisement (1913)

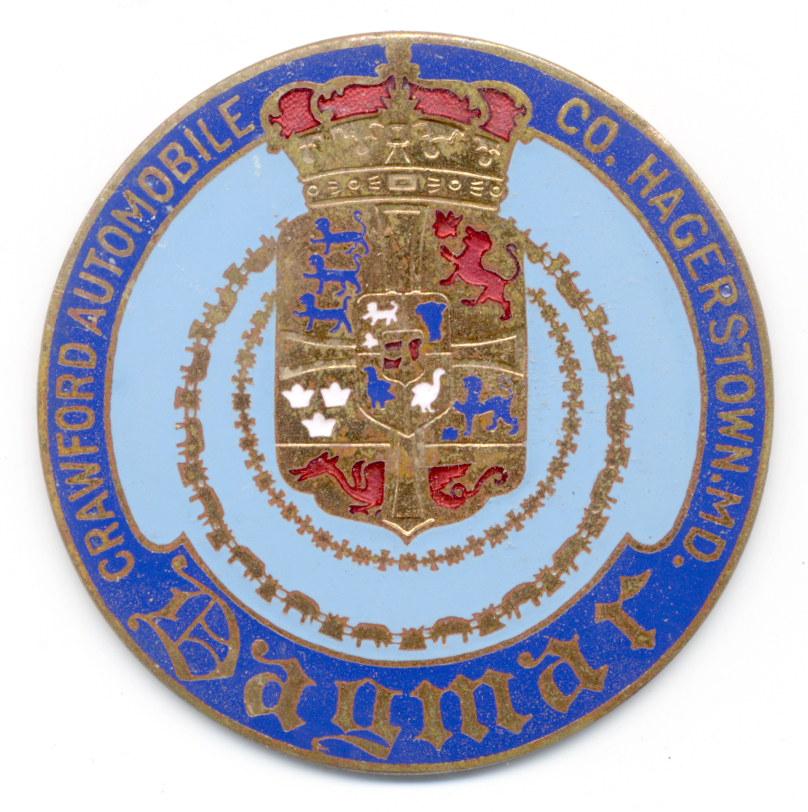
Radiator emblem from a Crawford Dagmar

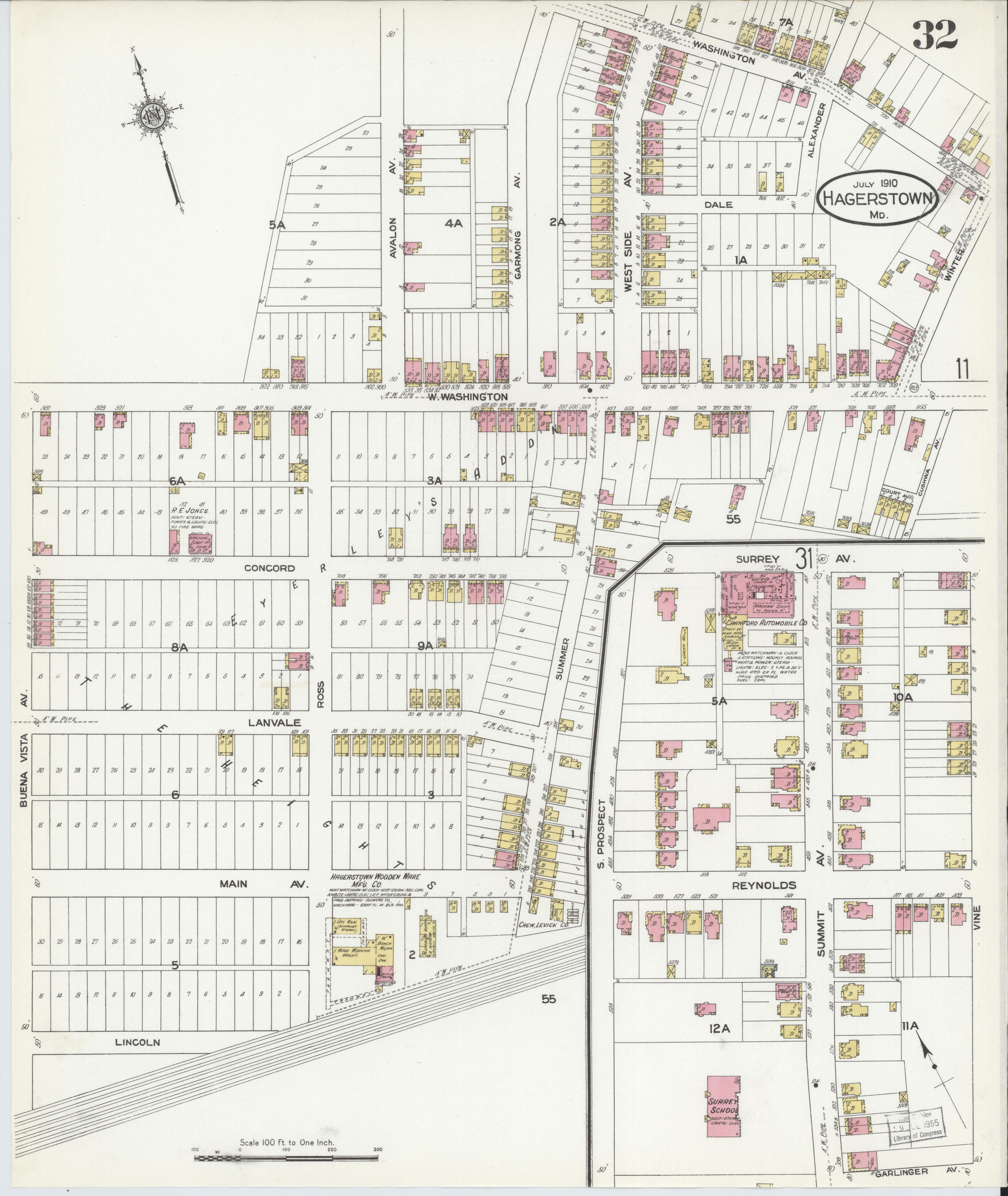
Crawford plant (1910)

The Crawford Automobile Company was an American automobile manufacturing company based in Hagerstown, Maryland which produced cars from 1905 to 1923. The factory was located on Surrey Avenue. After the Crawford Automobile Company was purchased by the M. P. Moller Pipe Organ Co., they produced a sporting version of the Crawford called the Dagmar (in production until 1927).

Crawfords were chain-driven until 1907, and the 1911–1914 models featured transaxles. Later cars featured brass trim, disc-covered wooden artillery wheels, and Continental six-cylinder engines.

== Overview of production figures ==
Year	Production	Model	Serial numbers
1904	2	A	
1905	25	A	
1906	150	A, C	
1907	137	E, F	
1908	218	E, F, D, G	
1909	226	F, D, G, H	
1910	275	10, F-G	
1911	163	11-30, 11-35	
1912	110	12-30, 12-35, 12-40	
1913	85	13-30, 13-40, 13-45	
1914	60	4-30, 4-40	927 to 987
1915	102	6-35, 4-40	988 to 1090
1916	104	16-6	1091 to 1195
1917	38	17-6-40	1196 to 1234
1918	59	18-6-40	1235 to 1294
1919	42	19-6-40	1295 to 1337
1920	109	20-6-40	1338 to 1447
1921	22	21-6-40	1448 to 1470
1922	54	22-6-30, 22-6-40, 22-6-60	1471 to 1525
1923	36	23-6-60, 23-6-70	1526 to 1562
Sum	2017		
