= Howdy Wilcox =

American racing driver (1889–1923)

- Wilcox, circa 1919
- Born: Howard Samuel Wilcox; June 24, 1889 Crawfordsville, Indiana, U.S.
- Died: September 4, 1923 (aged 34) Tipton, Pennsylvania, U.S.

Championship titles
- Major victories Indianapolis 500 (1919)

Champ Car career
- 36 races run over 12 years
- Best finish: 11th (1916)
- First race: 1910 100-mile Remy Brassard (Indianapolis)
- Last race: 1923 Altoona 200 (Altoona)
- First win: 1910 Remy Grand Trophy (Indianapolis)
- Last win: 1919 Indianapolis 500 (Indianapolis)
Wins	Podiums	Poles
3	9	1

Howard Samuel "Howdy" Wilcox (June 24, 1889 – September 4, 1923) was an American racing driver active in the formative years of auto racing. He won the 1919 Indianapolis 500.

== Formative years and family ==
Wilcox was born in Crawfordsville, Indiana, on June 24, 1889. He was preceded in death by his wife, who died in 1918. Wilcox's son, Howard Jr., founded the Little 500 bicycle race, which has been held at Indiana University annually since 1951.

== Racing career ==
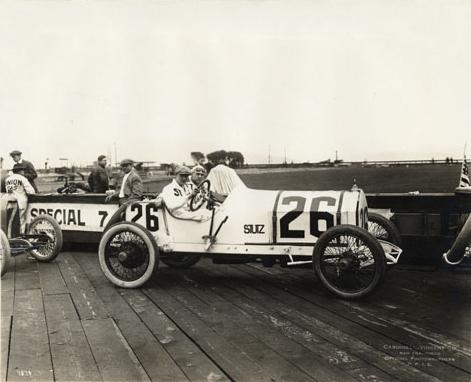
Wilcox at the wheel of his Stutz before the 1915 American Grand Prize in San Francisco

In 1911, Wilcox set the world beach racing speed record of 89.23 mph.

In 1919, Wilcox won the 1919 Indianapolis 500 driving a Peugeot. After starting second, Wilcox took the lead shortly after the halfway point when driver Ralph DePalma's car had mechanical trouble. Wilcox went on to led the last 98 laps of the race and claim victory.

In addition to winning the Indianapolis 500, Wilcox is considered the AAA National Champion of 1919. In 1927 AAA revised its record books using an updated form of scoring. The revised points gave Wilcox the 1919 AAA Championship Car season title retroactively.

In the 1923 Indianapolis 500, Wilcox was the slowest qualifier and started in the last row. During the race, however, he found speed and was leading the race when his engine failed. Later in that same race, driver Tommy Milton burned his hands. Wilcox was brought in as a relief driver while Milton's hands received medical attention. He drove Milton's car for 48 laps, leading 41 of them. Milton returned to his car and eventually won the race. As was the tradition of the times, Wilcox did not receive credit for his time driving the car which ultimately won the race.

Wilcox raced in 11 Indianapolis 500s from 1911 to 1923. He was the only driver to compete in the first 11 Indianapolis 500 races and the first to qualify at 100 mph.

== Death ==
Wilcox died on September 4, 1923, at Altoona Speedway board track in Tyrone, Pennsylvania, in a car crash. He was buried at Crown Hill Cemetery and Arboretum in Indianapolis in Section 56, Lot 240 (39.821503°N 86.178168°W).

== Motorsports career results ==
=== Indianapolis 500 results ===
Year	Car	Start	Qual	Rank	Finish	Laps	Led	Retired
1911	21	19	—	9	14	194	0	Flagged
1912	9	8	87.200	3	9	200	0	Running
1913	12	20	81.460	15	6	200	0	Running
1914	4	3	90.760	10	22	67	1	Valve
1915	1	1	98.900	1	7	200	5	Running
1916	29	6	93.810	6	7	120	0	Running
1919	3	2	100.010	7	1	200	98	Running
1920	18	20	88.820	12	19	65	0	Engine trouble
1921	10	12	96.000	7	23	22	0	Rod
1922	16	26	86.100	24	27	7	0	Valve spring
1923	25	8	81.000	24	17	60	51	Clutch
Totals						1335	155	

Starts	11
Poles	1
Front Row	3
Wins	1
Top 5	1
Top 10	5
Retired	5

Preceded by Dario Resta	Indianapolis 500 Winner; 1919	Succeeded by Gaston Chevrolet
