= Pete Henderson =

Canadian racing driver (1895–1940)

- Born: George Brooks Henderson; February 18, 1895 Arran, Ontario, Canada
- Died: June 19, 1940 (aged 45) Los Angeles, California, U.S.

Champ Car career
- 29 races run over 4 years
- Best finish: 8th (1916)
- First race: 1915 Des Moines 300 (Des Moines)
- Last race: 1920 Indianapolis 500 (Indianapolis)
- First win: 1917 50-mile Race (Speedway Park)
Wins	Podiums	Poles
1	2	0

George Brooks "Pete" Henderson (February 18, 1895 – June 19, 1940) was a Canadian racing driver. He began his racing career in 1915 at the Des Moines Speedway, as a driver and mechanic for the Duesenberg team.

== Motorsports career results ==
=== Indianapolis 500 results ===
Year	Car	Start	Qual	Rank	Finish	Laps	Led	Retired
1916	4	9	91.330	9	6	120	0	Running
1920	15	17	81.150	21	10	200	0	Running
Totals						320	0	

Starts	2
Poles	0
Front Row	0
Wins	0
Top 5	0
Top 10	2
Retired	0
