= 821st Aero Repair Squadron =

821st Aero Squadron
- Active: 1918
- Country: United States of America
- Allegiance: United States of America
- Branch: Aviation Section, U.S. Signal Corps
- Role: Repair & Maintenance

The 821st Aero Repair Squadron was a repair squadron during World War I

== History ==
The 821st Aero Repair Squadron was activated in order to provide service and repair to aircraft flying within the United States during World War I. It was stationed on the grounds of the Indianapolis Motor Speedway, which was closed to racing during the United States' participation in the war. The squadron was in New York awaiting embarkation to France when the Armistice with Germany was signed on 11 November 1918, and as a result did not embark to France.

== Stations ==
- Speedway, Indiana

== See also ==
- List of American Aero Squadrons
