= Gil Andersen =

American racing driver (1879–1930)

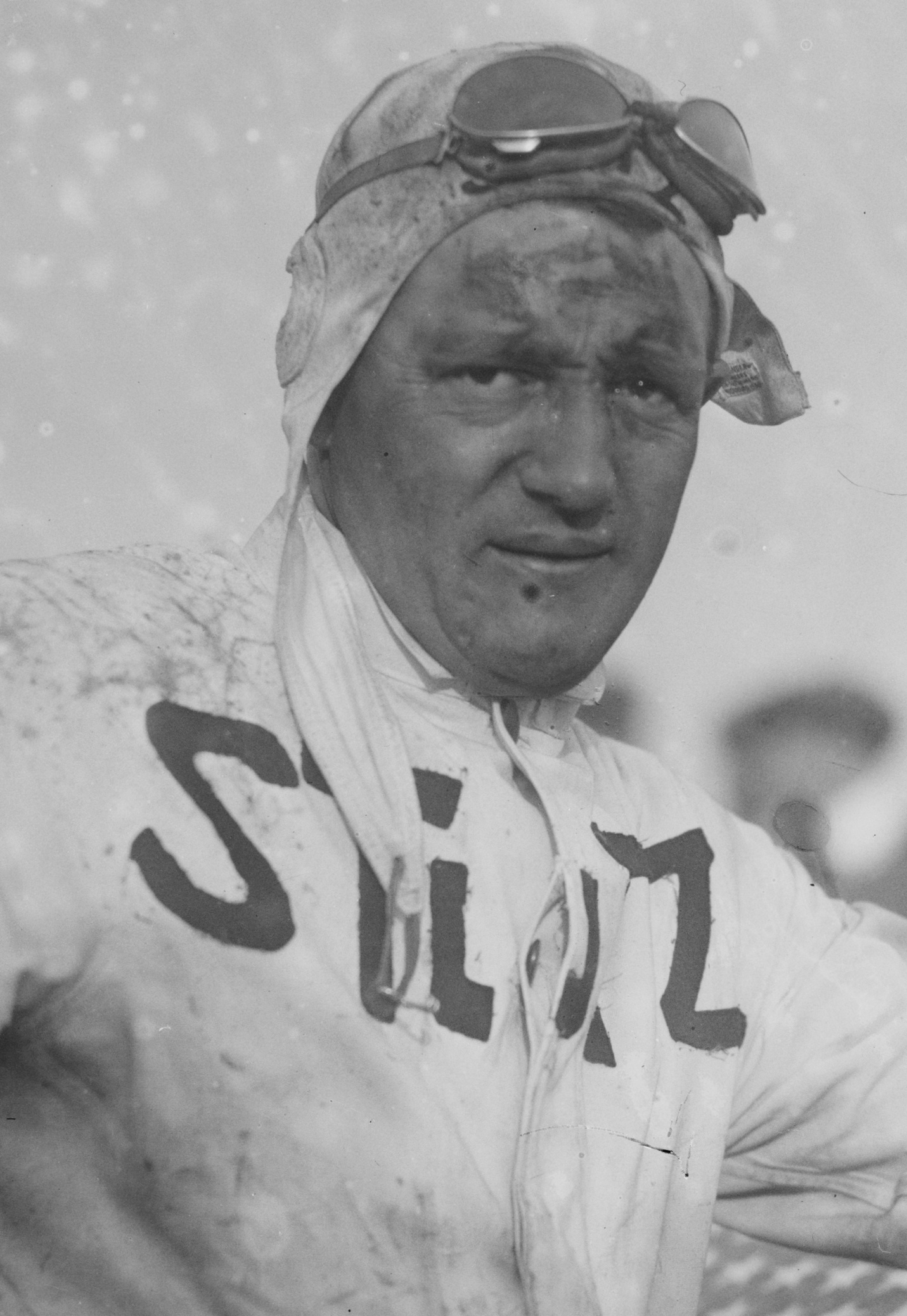
- Andersen at the 1915 Indianapolis 500
- Born: Gulbrand J. Andersen; November 27, 1879 Horten, Vestfold, Norway
- Died: September 20, 1930 (aged 50) Logansport, Indiana, U.S.

Champ Car career
- 31 races run over 8 years
- First race: 1910 Remy Brassard #1 (Indianapolis)
- Last race: 1917 Uniontown Race #3 (Uniontown)
- First win: 1913 Elgin National Trophy (Elgin)
- Last win: 1915 Astor Cup (Sheepshead Bay)
Wins	Podiums	Poles
3	10	0

Gilbert J. Andersen (born Gulbrand, November 27, 1879 – September 20, 1930) was an American racing driver active during the formative years of auto racing.

== Biography ==
Andersen was born on November 27, 1879, in Horten, Vestfold county, Norway. Andersen and his family emigrated to Chicago, Illinois, in 1895, whereupon Andersen took the name Gilbert. He became a citizen of the United States in 1900. He married Elsie Olsen on March 3, 1909, in Minneapolis, Minnesota. He competed in the first six Indianapolis 500 races, appearing in annual races from 1911 through 1916.

One of Andersen's major victories was in the 1913 Elgin National Road Races, which he won at an average speed of 71 mph. On October 9, 1915, he set a new auto speed record of 102.6 mph, winning the first Astor Cup race at Sheepshead Bay. New York. In 1928, Andersen established a new American stock car speed record, when he clocked 106.52 mph in a Stutz Blackhawk on the measured mile at Daytona Beach, Florida.

Andersen worked as an engineer for the Stutz Motor Company. Stutz was in operation from 1911 and continued through 1935. He also was an engineer for the ReVere Motor Company, located in Logansport, Cass County, Indiana.

Andersen died of pulmonary tuberculosis on September 20, 1930, in Logansport, Indiana, at age 50.

== Motorsports career results ==
=== Indianapolis 500 results ===
Year	Car	Start	Qual	Rank	Finish	Laps	Led	Retired
1911	10	10	—	—	11	200	0	Running
1912	1	1	80.930	12	16	80	0	Crash T3
1913	3	14	82.630	11	12	187	18	Camshaft gears
1914	24	16	90.490	11	26	42	0	Cylinder bolts
1915	5	5	95.140	5	3	200	26	Running
1916	28	3	95.940	3	13	75	0	Oil line
Totals						784	44	

Starts	6
Poles	1
Front Row	2
Wins	0
Top 5	1
Top 10	1
Retired	4

== Gallery ==
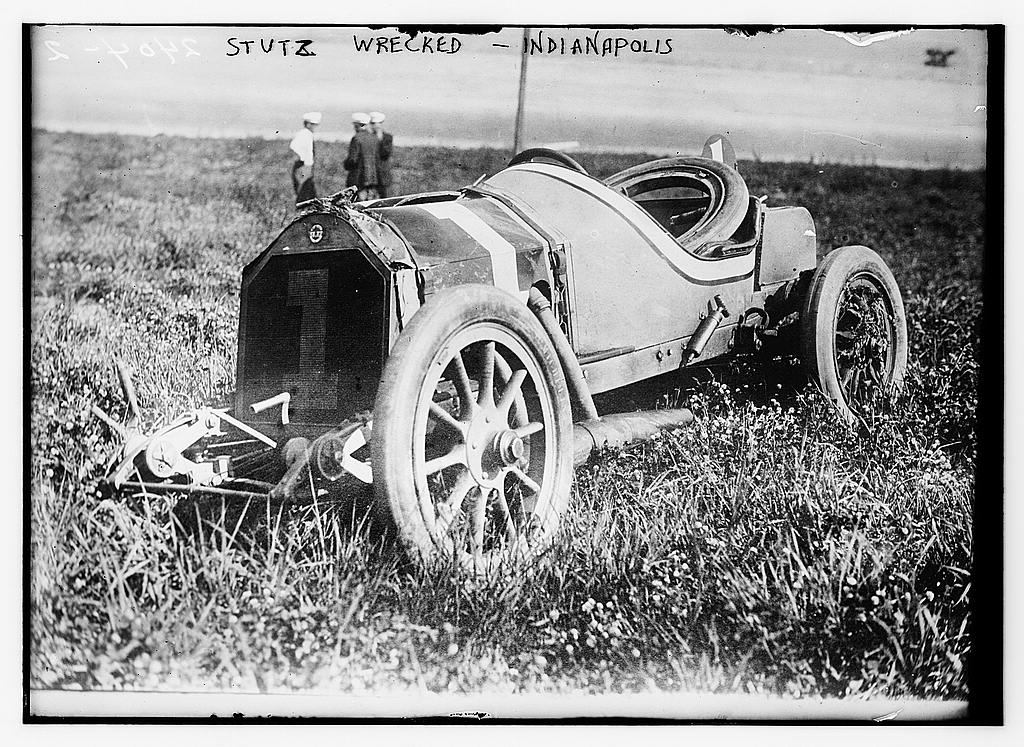
Gil Andersen's crashed Stutz at T3 in the 1912 Indianapolis 500

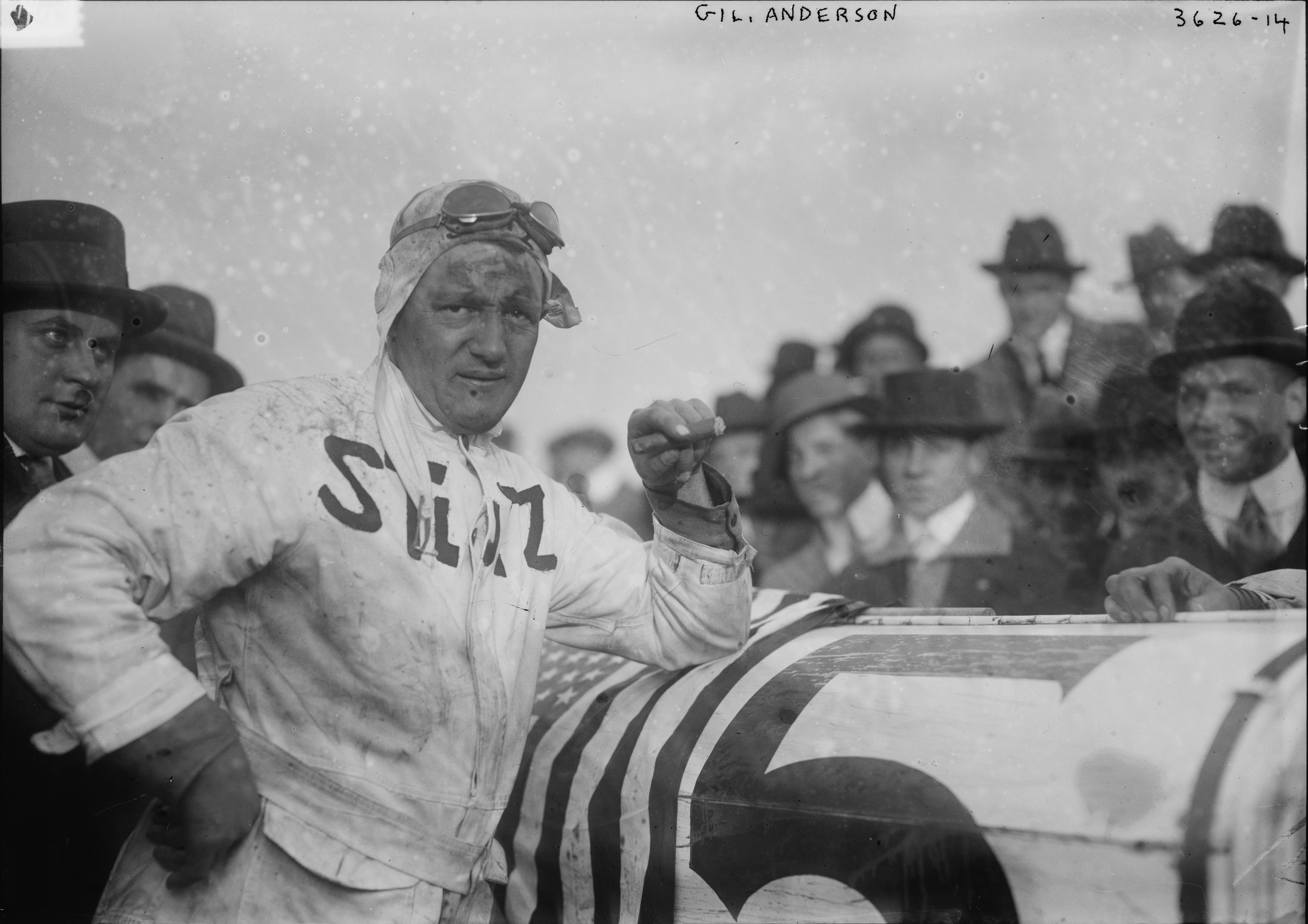
Gil Andersen at the 1915 Indianapolis 500

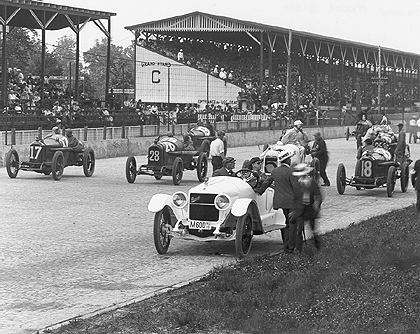
Andersen's #28 car (second from left), preparing for the 1916 Indianapolis 500
