= Wilbur D'Alene =

American racing driver (1884–1966)

- Born: Edwin Wilbur Aleon; October 25, 1884 Center Township, Indiana, U.S.
- Died: December 2, 1966 (aged 82) Fort Myers, Florida, U.S.

Champ Car career
- 17 races run over 5 years
- Best finish: 6th (1916)
- First race: 1914 Golden Potlach Trophy (Tacoma)
- Last race: 1922 Indianapolis 500 (Indianapolis)
Wins	Podiums	Poles
0	3	0

Edwin Wilbur Aleon (October 25, 1884 – December 2, 1966) was an American racing driver who competed under the nom de course Wilbur D'Alene. Aleon finished second in the 1916 Indianapolis 500.

== Motorsports career results ==
=== Indianapolis 500 results ===
Year	Car	Start	Qual	Rank	Finish	Laps	Led	Retired
1916	1	10	90.870	11	2	120	0	Running
1919	22	23	94.200	21	17	120	0	Axle
1922	25	18	87.800	22	15	160	0	Flagged
Totals						400	0	

Starts	3
Poles	0
Front Row	0
Wins	0
Top 5	1
Top 10	1
Retired	1
