= 1916 AAA Championship Car season =

Auto racing season

- AAA National Championship Trail

Season
- Races: 15
- Start date: May 13
- End date: November 30

Awards
- National champion: (United Kingdom) Dario Resta
- Indianapolis 500 winner: (United Kingdom) Dario Resta

The 1916 AAA Championship Car season consisted of 15 races, beginning in Brooklyn, New York on May 13 and concluding in Los Angeles, California on November 30. There were also 12 non-championship races. For the first time since the 1905 season, the AAA awarded points towards a National Championship. The AAA National Champion and Indianapolis 500 winner was Dario Resta.

== Schedule and results ==
Rnd	Date	Race name	Length	Track	Location	Type	Pole position	Winning driver
NC	April 8	(United States) Corona Race	301.712 mi (485.558 km)	Grand Boulevard	Corona, California	Road	—	(United States) Eddie O'Donnell
NC	April 29	(United States) Raisin Classic	301 mi (484 km)	Fresno Road Race Course	Fresno, California	Road	—	(United States) Eddie O'Donnell
NC	May 13	(United States) Coney Island Cup	20 mi (32 km)	Sheepshead Bay Speedway	Brooklyn, New York	Board	—	(United States) Johnny Aitken
NC	May 13	(United States) Queens Cup	50 mi (80 km)	Sheepshead Bay Speedway	Brooklyn, New York	Board	—	(United States) Ralph Mulford
1	May 13	(United States) Metropolitan Trophy	150 mi (240 km)	Sheepshead Bay Speedway	Brooklyn, New York	Board	—	(United States) Eddie Rickenbacker
2	May 30	(United States) 1916 Indianapolis 500	300 mi (480 km)^{A}	Indianapolis Motor Speedway	Speedway, Indiana	Brick	(United States) Johnny Aitken	(United Kingdom) Dario Resta
3	June 11	(United States) Chicago Race	300 mi (480 km)	Speedway Park	Maywood, Illinois	Board	(United States) Ralph DePalma	(United Kingdom) Dario Resta
NC	June 24	(United States) Des Moines Sprint Race	50 mi (80 km)	Des Moines Speedway	Valley Junction, Iowa	Board	—	(United States) Eddie Rickenbacker
4	June 24	(United States) Des Moines Race	150 mi (240 km)	Des Moines Speedway	Valley Junction, Iowa	Board	(United States) Ralph DePalma	(United States) Ralph DePalma
5	July 4	(United States) Minneapolis Race	150 mi (240 km)	Twin City Motor Speedway	Minneapolis, Minnesota	Concrete	(United States) Louis Chevrolet	(United States) Ralph DePalma
NC	July 15	(United States) Omaha Sprint Race	50 mi (80 km)	Omaha Speedway	Omaha, Nebraska	Board	—	(United States) Ralph DePalma
6	July 15	(United States) Omaha Race	150 mi (240 km)	Omaha Speedway	Omaha, Nebraska	Board	(United States) Ralph Mulford	(United Kingdom) Dario Resta
NC	July 22	(United States) Kansas City Race	100 mi (160 km)	Kansas City Speedway	Kansas City, Missouri	Dirt	—	(United States) Ralph DePalma
NC	July 22	(United States) Kansas City Race	16.875 mi (27.158 km)	Kansas City Speedway	Kansas City, Missouri	Dirt	—	(United States) W. W. Brown
7	August 5	(United States) Montamarathon/Potlach Trophy Race	288 mi (463 km)	Pacific Coast Speedway	Tacoma, Washington	Board	(United States) Sterling Price	(United States) Eddie Rickenbacker
NC	August 19	(United States) Speedway Grand Prix	50 mi (80 km)	Speedway Park	Maywood, Illinois	Board	(United Kingdom) Dario Resta	(United Kingdom) Dario Resta
8	September 4	(United States) International Sweepstakes	300 mi (480 km)	Cincinnati Motor Speedway	Sharonville, Ohio	Board	(United States) Howdy Wilcox	(United States) Johnny Aitken
NC	September 9	(United States) Harvest Auto Racing Classic	20 mi (32 km)	Indianapolis Motor Speedway	Speedway, Indiana	Brick	(United States) Louis Chevrolet	(United States) Johnny Aitken
NC	September 9	(United States) Harvest Auto Racing Classic	50 mi (80 km)	Indianapolis Motor Speedway	Speedway, Indiana	Brick	—	(United States) Johnny Aitken
9	September 9	(United States) Harvest Auto Racing Classic	100 mi (160 km)	Indianapolis Motor Speedway	Speedway, Indiana	Brick	—	(United States) Johnny Aitken
10	September 30	(United States) Astor Cup Race	250 mi (400 km)	Sheepshead Bay Speedway	Brooklyn, New York	Board	—	(United States) Johnny Aitken
11	October 14	(United States) Grand American Auto Race	250 mi (400 km)	Speedway Park	Maywood, Illinois	Board	(United States) Art Klein	(United Kingdom) Dario Resta
12	October 28	(United States) Harkness Trophy Race	250 mi (400 km)	Sheepshead Bay Speedway	Brooklyn, New York	Board	(United States) James Benedict	(United States) Johnny Aitken
13	November 16	(United States) William K. Vanderbilt Cup	294.595 mi (474.105 km)	Santa Monica Road Race Course	Santa Monica, California	Road	(United States) Mike Moosie	(United Kingdom) Dario Resta
14	November 18	(United States) American Grand Prize^{B}	403.2 mi (648.9 km)	Santa Monica Road Race Course	Santa Monica, California	Road	(United States) Mike Moosie	(United States) Howdy Wilcox
14	November 18	(United States) American Grand Prize^{B}	403.2 mi (648.9 km)	Santa Monica Road Race Course	Santa Monica, California	Road	(United States) Mike Moosie	(United States) Johnny Aitken^{C}
15	November 30	(United States) Championship Award Sweepstakes	150 mi (240 km)	Ascot Speedway	South Los Angeles, California	Dirt	(United States) Eddie Rickenbacker	(United States) Eddie Rickenbacker
NC	December 2	(United States) Universal Trophy	225 mi (362 km)	Uniontown Speedway	Hopwood, Pennsylvania	Board	—	(United States) Louis Chevrolet

Concrete/Brick/Board/Dirt Oval
Road Course/Hill Climb
Non-championship race

^A Reduced from 500 to 300 miles due to the onset of World War I.
^B Sanctioned by the Automobile Club of America, AAA awarded points.
^C Shared drive.

== Leading National Championship standings ==
#	Driver	Car	Points
1	(United Kingdom) Dario Resta	Peugeot	4100
2	(United States) Johnny Aitken	Peugeot	3440
3	(United States) Eddie Rickenbacker	Maxwell, Peugeot, Duesenberg	2910
4	(United States) Ralph DePalma	Mercedes, Peugeot	1790
5	(United States) Earl Cooper	Stutz-Wisconsin, Stutz	1405
6	(United States) Wilbur D'Alene	Duesenberg	1120
7	(United States) Tommy Milton	Duesenberg	690
8	(Canada) Pete Henderson	Maxwell	667
9	(United States) Frank Galvin	Sunbeam Motor Car Company	645
10	(United States) Ralph Mulford	Peugeot	620

== General references ==
- Åberg, Andreas. "AAA National Championship 1916". Driver Database. Archived from the original on October 19, 2012.
- "1916 AAA National Championship Trail". ChampCarStats.com. Archived from the original on February 14, 2012.
- Harms, Phil. "1916 Championship Driver Summary" (PDF). Motorsport.com. Archived from the original (PDF) on August 10, 2012.

== See also ==
- 1916 Indianapolis 500
- 1916 American Grand Prize
