= Detroit Health Department =

City of Detroit government agency

Department overview
- Formed: 1827; 199 years ago (as Board of Health)
- Headquarters: 100 Mack Avenue, Detroit, Michigan, U.S. 48201
- Department executives: Ali Abazeed, Chief Public Health Officer and Director; Christina Floyd, Deputy Director of Public Health; Claudia Richardson, Medical Director
- Parent department: City of Detroit
- Website: Official website

The Detroit Health Department has provided public health services, and has partnered with neighborhoods and community stakeholders, for over 100 years. The department was able to grow from its focus on communicable diseases (such as tuberculosis) to one that had over 40 programs and services at one point. When budgets began to deteriorate, many of those programs and services ended. With the city on the verge of bankruptcy, most of the department's remaining services were contracted out to a private agency, the Institute for Population Health (IPH). However, upon successful progress post-bankruptcy the City of Detroit was able to take control of many of the services that were transitioned to IPH in 2014 and 2015. In 2015, Mayor Mike Duggan hired Abdul El-Sayed to run the department, and he stayed in that role for a little over a year before leaving to run for Governor of Michigan. In February 2017, Joneigh Khaldun, a practicing emergency physician and former Chief Medical Officer of the Baltimore City Health Department, was appointed to lead the department. In September 2019, Denise Fair was appointed by Mayor Mike Duggan to be the Chief Public Health Officer of the Detroit Health Department. On March 2, 2026, Mayor Mary Sheffield appointed Ali Abazeed as Chief Public Health Officer and Director of the Detroit Health Department.

== History ==
=== Early years ===
In 1827, a board of three physicians was appointed by the city council, which was at that time referred to as the city's Common Council, to measure factors and determinants that affected the health of the city, on a holistic and individual level. They focused on mostly environmental issues, which included cleaning up the Detroit River and surrounding rivers and controlling and providing public water supply and sewage disposal systems.

An additional physician was added to the Board of Health on October 1, 1831, when smallpox was introduced to the city. It then became the duty of the health officers to check all those who came into Detroit for smallpox and to go to each residence in the city to vaccinate those who had not been previously vaccinated. This initial Board of Health is the city's earliest history of public health and included "environmental sanitation, communicable disease control, epidemiology, prevention through isolation of cases, quarantine of contacts, and vaccination of susceptibles".

During this smallpox epidemic, the city's first public hospital was built in 1839 to care for homeless and impoverished Detroit residents. Between 1848 and 1881, another small public hospital was built and the Board of Health rented houses where they could employ nurses, officers, agents, etc. from the city hospitals to care for patients who could not afford to receive care at the city hospitals or in private homes.

After the reorganization of city government in 1881, O.W. Wright became Detroit's first full-time Health Officer, and in 1883 the city purchased a site, which would eventually become the site of the Herman Kiefer Complex, to build a hospital that would accommodate 50 people. This hospital was operated by the Sisters of Charity to care for ill patients with contagious diseases until 1892, when it was destroyed by a fire.

The Board of Health leased a steamboat, known as the Milton D. Ward Contagious Disease Hospital, on Rouge River between 1892 and 1894 to continue to care for patients with infectious diseases. In 1894, a small frame building was erected to handle the continuing smallpox epidemic, while other infectious diseases were treated in private hospitals.

=== Construction of Herman Kiefer Hospital ===
Due to the increasing outbreaks of contagious diseases within the City of Detroit in the beginning of the 1900s, a more permanent and suitable facility began to be constructed. In 1911, the first two pavilions of a new contagious disease hospital were constructed, and on April 31, 1911, these two pavilions, which became known as the Herman Kiefer Hospital for Contagious Disease, were opened. This hospital was originally supposed to be named after Guy Kiefer, who was a city health officer for the Detroit Health Department and had worked for years to get a permanent contagious disease hospital in Detroit; however, he had requested that the hospital be named after his father, Herman Kiefer, who was a well-known physician and civil rights activist.

Over the next four years, four more pavilions were constructed and opened. In addition to these pavilions, there was also one brick service building, one frame cottage for smallpox, a two-story service building, 12 cottages for tuberculosis, and a nurses' home. By 1918, the hospital held almost 3,500 patients, and due to the rise in tuberculosis, the Detroit Health Department also constructed the Detroit Municipal Tuberculosis Sanatorium, which was located outside of the Detroit city limits and opened in 1921.

Though the hospital focused on treatment, the Detroit Health Department also used the hospital to educate residents about contagious diseases and how they can be prevented. Despite this education, the increased number of European immigrants and Black migrants from the South moving into poor housing contributed to the increase in the number of smallpox cases in Detroit. This led to further expansion of the Herman Kiefer Hospital through the construction of pavilions 6 and 7, as well as a modern powerhouse, in 1922. In 1928, the construction of the main building of the Herman Kiefer Hospital (which currently sits along Taylor and the M-10 freeway) was completed. With the completion of the main hospital, there were over 1,200 beds across the entire complex.

=== Henry F. Vaughan's tenure as Health Director ===
During the construction of the Herman Kiefer Hospital, the department selected Henry F. Vaughan as the first Health Director with a Doctorate in Public Health. This implemented preventative medicine into the Detroit Health Department's goals and objectives. Due to the high levels of typhoid fever, smallpox, and diphtheria, Vaughan required physicians to practice preventative medicine by administering vaccinations and attending conferences to become up to date on current treatments for these diseases and future health issues. Vaughan also encouraged public participation in preventative medicine by allowing public health nurses to come into homes to conduct periodic checkups as well as education.

Vaughan believed that it was important to reach every resident concerning health education and encouraged the Detroit Health Department to use radio, magazines, and billboards to convey messages regarding health education and ways to safely protect oneself from disease. His goals included protecting a higher percentage of children between the ages of six months and ten years against diphtheria, increase vaccination for smallpox, increase periodic health examinations, and increase periodic dental examinations. Vaughan became the longest reigning Health Director of the Detroit Health Department, serving as Health Director between 1919 and 1941 (22 years).

=== The peak of the Detroit Health Department ===
Due to advances in technology and treatment, especially vaccines, the number of contagious diseases in the US, and in the city of Detroit, began to decrease. Also, in the 1960s, the quality of services that were offered through the Detroit Health Department at Herman Kiefer began to deteriorate. By the mid 1960s, two of Herman Kiefer's 7 pavilions had been closed and demolished to construct Clare M. Sanders Elementary School, and the hospital portion of the campus had scaled back on its tuberculosis clinic operations.

By the 1980s, most of the hospital's campus was converted to uses such as a general hospital, medical clinic, laboratories, a drug treatment center, and a state psychiatric ward. At this time Herman Kiefer Hospital was renamed to Herman Kiefer Complex. Between 1980 and 2010, the Detroit Health Department went from providing over 40 services and programs to the public to around 30, and the number of clinics that it had throughout the city reduced from 10 in 1980, to 5 in 1988, and down to 2 (outside of Herman Kiefer) in 2007. It was also during this time that the name of the Detroit Health Department was changed to the Detroit Department of Health and Wellness Promotion (DHWP) in 2004 by the Health Director at that time, Noble Maseru. Maseru wanted the public to be aware of the department's focus on public health education and prevention, and at this time a majority of the programs that had not been unfunded maintained this focus. Although there was a lot of downsizing during this time due to the loss of grant funding for some programs, the Detroit Health Department was still the main provider of public health services in the City of Detroit especially for those Detroiters who were uninsured or under-insured.

=== Decline of the Detroit Health Department ===
Beginning in 2010, the Health Department was affected by the ongoing investigations and financial scandals that had plagued other city departments. In 2010, the EPA investigated and sentenced a lead inspector for bribery and certifying false work. By this time, the population had fallen to 713,777, which was a low that the city had not seen since the 1900s. Key tax revenue sources that the city received were threatened due to the revenue being purposed for a population of 750,000. In 2011, FBI investigations of the Human Services Department revealed financial mismanagement at the Health Department and the director was fired. In December 2011, the State of Michigan found the city had a debt problem with up to $12 billion in long-term liabilities, causing the City of Detroit and Mayor Dave Bing to begin cutting costs everywhere possible. In 2012, then Mayor Dave Bing began talking about closing the Health Department, merging it with the Wayne County Health Department, or spinning it off as a nonprofit in order to balance the City budget as part of the Consent Agreement to avoid bankruptcy. His plan included subtracting all of the money that the city afforded the Health Department, which totaled to $10 million, and moving all state and federal funding, totaling over $54 million, to a private nonprofit institute - the Institute for Population Health (IPH). Although this plan received support from Michigan Governor Rick Snyder, Mayor Dave Bing, and the Health Director at the time, Loretta Davis, it failed to show the benefit to the population of Detroit and to current Detroit Health Department city employees. This plan included dismantling services that reached over 200,000 Detroiters each year. Due to this, and the limited knowledge that Detroit City Council had of the complete plan to transfer services, they voted to file a motion to halt the transfer of public services to IPH. Following this request, Mayor Bing stepped into action to give city council an outline of the plan and how the plan would affect the city's budget. Once the Mayor ensured that the City Charter would not be violated and the city council received all necessary details, they voted to remove funding from the Health Department.

By the end of 2012, former Health Director Loretta Davis was named CEO of IPH and Mayor Bing appointed Vernice Anthony as the new Health Director. The Detroit Health Department was now down to four services:

- Birth and Death Records
- Ryan White HIV/AIDS Program and Housing Opportunities for People Living with AIDS (HOPWA)
- Healthy Start
- Tuberculosis Services

With the City of Detroit's declaration of bankruptcy in December 2013, these minimal services were also removed from the Detroit Health Department. During this year Health Resources and Services Administration (HRSA) transferred this grant to IPH due to the observation that the Detroit Health Department would no longer be able to manage this program because all of its public health services were being phased out, and tuberculosis services were also transferred to IPH. On December 13, 2013, Birth and Death Records, one of the largest and oldest operations within the Detroit Health Department, was permanently closed and this service was transferred over to the Wayne County Clerk's Office. With the outsourcing of nearly all of its services, Detroit became the first U.S. major city to convert its health department to a private institute.

=== Rebuilding the Detroit Health Department ===
The beginning of 2014 marked the start of a turnaround for the City of Detroit. Mayor Mike Duggan had been elected, and with a "fresh start", the focus of the city government was to provide the services that the people of Detroit needed. By the end of September, the start of the 2014 - 2015 fiscal year, many of the public health services that had been transferred to IPH, were either transferred back to the Detroit Health Department (emergency preparedness, immunizations, and maternal and child health) or contracted out to other vendors. Wayne State University School of Medicine took over infectious disease testing and treatment, and organizations such as the Arab American and Chaldean Council (ACC), Moms and Babes, and Community Health and Social Services (CHASS) took over WIC programs. By the end of the year, the city was able to announce its official exit from bankruptcy, and there were even more changes that would be made by city officials that would aid in rebuilding the city's health department.

By August 2015, the contract that IPH had with the City of Detroit to provide public health services to residents ended, and the remaining public health services (Lead Prevention, Vision and Hearing, Environmental Health, and Food Safety and Sanitation) that were being managed by IPH returned to the Detroit Health Department. IPH continues to provide the Maternal Infant Health and Healthy Start Program, primary care and family medicine, dental services, and behavioral health. With the return of all services to the Health Department, Mayor Duggan announced his appointment of a new Health Director, Abdul El-Sayed, who remained at the health department for about 18 months until he announced a run for Governor of Michigan. Mayor Mike Duggan then appointed Joneigh Khaldun, an emergency physician with previous experience in the US Department of Health and Human Services, academia, and as Chief Medical Officer of the Baltimore City Health Department. Since then, the Department has focused on building community and hospital partnerships, and is addressing public health challenges such as infant mortality, violence prevention and behavioral health. In September 2019, Duggan appointed Denise Fair as Chief Public Health Officer. Under her leadership, the department gained national recognition for its COVID-19 response, including mass testing and vaccination initiatives focused on equity and access. Denise Fair Razo (Denise Fair) led the department until March 2026, when Abazeed succeeded her as Chief Public Health Officer and Director. Detroit Health Department services include:

- Environmental Health and Food Safety
- Ryan White HIV/AIDS Program and Housing Opportunities for People Living with AIDS (HOPWA)
- Child and Adult Immunizations
- Lead Prevention
- Epidemiology and Communicable Diseases
- Maternal Child Health
- Emergency Preparedness
- Vision and Hearing Screening
- Women, Infants, and Children (WIC) Program
- Community Health
- Ceasefire

== Notable moments ==
- 1827: Detroit's first Board of Health is appointed by the city's Common Council
- 1831: Detroit's Board of Health responds to the city's first smallpox epidemic
- 1839: Detroit's first public hospital is built
- 1881: Detroit's first full-time Health Officer, O. W. Wright, is elected
- 1879: The first division was added to the Board of Health (Food, Meat, and Milk Inspection)
- 1895: The Michigan Legislature gave the Board of Health its structure in State Law
- 1911: The Herman Kiefer Hospital for Contagious Diseases was opened to handle the care and treatment of many different types of infectious diseases with a focus on Tuberculosis
- 1919: The Board of Health selects its youngest Health Director, Henry F. Vaughan (at 29)
- 1963: The Board of Health has its highest number of employees (3,500)
- 1981: The Board of Health changes its name to the Department of Health
- 2004: The Department of Health changes its name to the Detroit Department of Health and Wellness Promotion (DHWP)
- 2013: Detroit became the first major U.S. city to contract health department services with a private, not-for-profit institute
- 2015: Public health services return to DHWP under city government control, Abdul El-Sayed appointed as Executive Director
- 2016: The DHWP changes its name to the Detroit Health Department
- 2017: Joneigh S. Khaldun appointed as Director
- 2019: Denise Fair appointed as Chief Public Health Officer
- 2026: Ali Abazeed appointed Chief Public Health Officer and Director of the Detroit Health Department by Mayor Mary Sheffield
