= Victor C. Vaughan =

American physician and eugenicist (1851–1929)

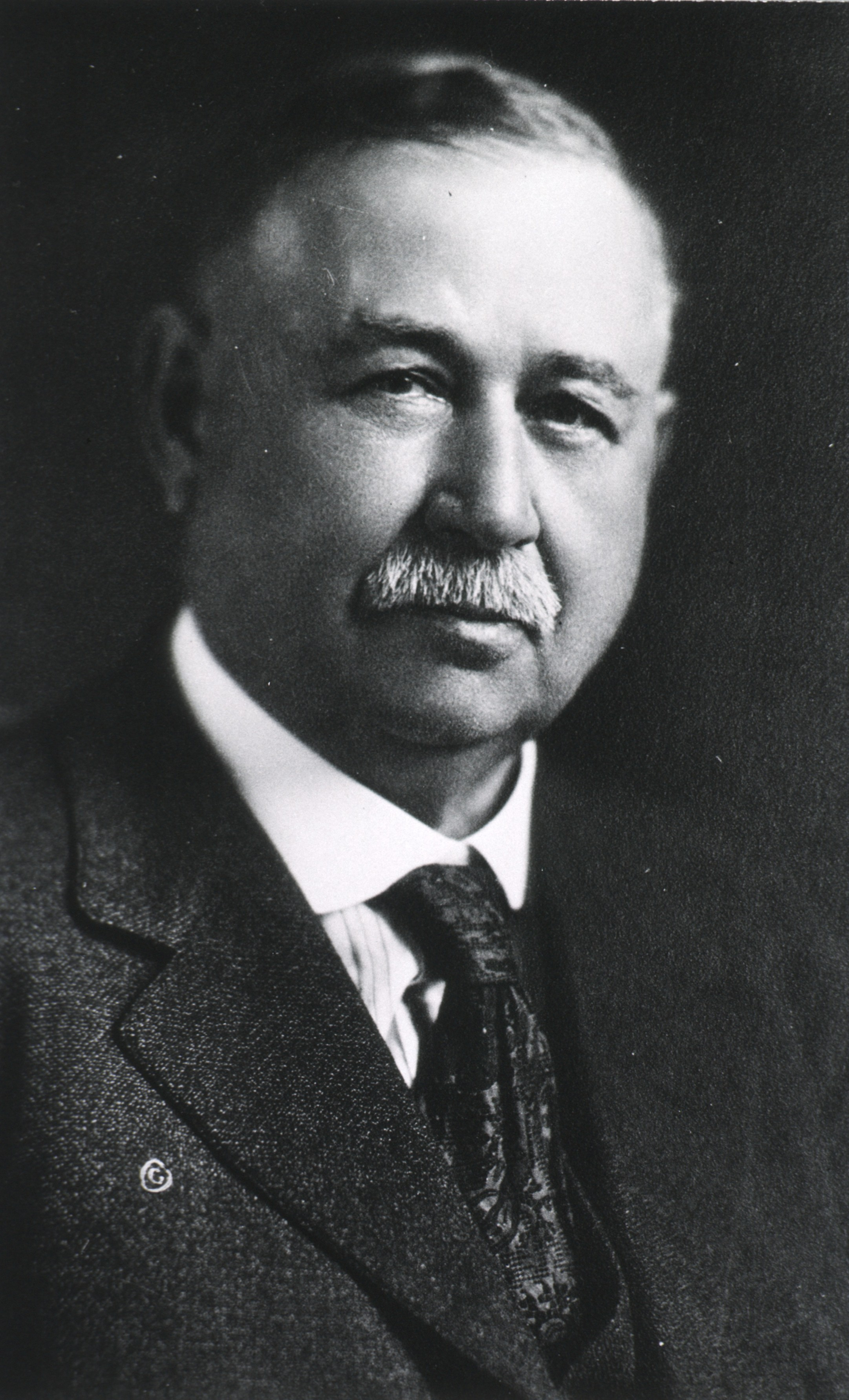
- Born: Victor Clarence Vaughan; October 27, 1851; Mount Airy, Missouri, U.S.
- Died: November 21, 1929 (aged 78); Richmond, Virginia, U.S.
- Resting place: Forest Lawn Cemetery; Detroit, Michigan, U.S.
- Occupations: physician, educator, academic administrator
- Spouse: Dora Catherine Taylor (after 1877)

Academic background
- Education: Mount Pleasant College (BS); University of Michigan (MS, PhD, MD)
- Academic advisor: Eugene W. Hilgard

Academic work
- Discipline: Medicine
- Sub-discipline: biochemistry, bacteriology
- Institutions: University of Michigan Medical School
- Military career
- Allegiance: United States of America
- Branch: United States Army
- Service years: 1898–1899, 1917–1918
- Rank: Colonel
- Units: 33rd Michigan Volunteer Infantry; General Medical Board
- Conflicts: Spanish–American War: Battle of Santiago; World War I
- Awards: Distinguished Service Medal

Victor Clarence Vaughan (October 27, 1851 – November 21, 1929) was an American physician, medical researcher, educator, and academic administrator. From 1891 to 1921 he was the dean of the University of Michigan Medical School, which rose to national prominence under his leadership.

He also served as president of both the American Medical Association and the Association of American Physicians, founded multiple medical journals, and was a leader in standardizing state medical licensing exams throughout the country. Serving with the U.S. Army during the Spanish–American War and World War I, he was instrumental in helping the military cope with the threats of typhoid fever and influenza.

His views on eugenics and forced sterilization of criminals and the mentally disabled, while not unusual among medical professionals and academics of his time, have received criticism as misguided.

== Early life and education ==
Victor Vaughan was born on October 27, 1851, in Mount Airy, Missouri. His parents were John Vaughan and Adeline Dameron; his paternal grandparents had immigrated from Wales in 1812, and his mother's family were of French Huguenot and English descent and traced their time in America to 1699. He received his early education at the home of a local physician, and when the physician moved away the community built a school—the Hazel Hill Academy—where Vaughan received the remainder of his education until college.

During the Civil War, an officer in the Union home guards came to the area hoping to kill Vaughan's father as revenge for having served as the foreman of a jury that had convicted him of theft some years earlier. The officer and his men occupied the family home and made off with most of the family's belongings while John Vaughan hid out and made plans for his family to escape with him to southern Illinois, where they stayed from February to October 1865 before returning home.

Vaughan attended Central College in Fayette, Missouri, in 1867, but he did not do well and withdrew after one semester before enrolling at Mount Pleasant College in Huntsville, Missouri, the following year. The college had just reopened following the Civil War and when Vaughan was 19 he became an instructor of Latin; a year later, after discovering a chemistry lab in a locked-up room at the college, he began teaching chemistry as well. He completed his degree requirements in 1871 but did not formally graduate until 1872 once the school had been reopened a full four years. He was the only one in his class who had satisfied the requirements for an A.B. degree, so he chose to graduate with a less-prestigious B.S. degree like the rest of his classmates. He quit teaching at Mount Pleasant College in February 1874 after instructors' salaries were cut in half, and a week later began teaching Latin and chemistry at Hardin College, where he remained for one semester.

=== Graduate education and early career ===
Based on the reputation of its faculty, Vaughan decided to enroll at the University of Michigan for graduate studies in biology, chemistry, and geology, and in September 1874 he and a classmate rode the Wabash Railroad to Ann Arbor. Due to his having taken a lesser degree from a relatively unknown school, President James B. Angell required him to interview with three professors before offering him a place in the graduate course: chemist Albert B. Prescott, botanist and meteorologist (and future president of the University of Washington) Mark W. Harrington, and geologist Eugene W. Hilgard. The three approved, and Vaughan became Hilgard's student assistant for the year, helping him categorize fossils. Hilgard invited Vaughan to go with him when he accepted a position at Berkeley in 1875, but Vaughan preferred to stay at Michigan.

He wrote his master's thesis, The Separation of Arsenic and Antimony, and received his degree in June 1875. That December, he was appointed an instructor of physiological chemistry, replacing Preston B. Rose following the latter's dismissal as part of a growing controversy involving missing funds that would continue until 1881. He received his PhD in 1876 and wrote three theses: one entitled The Osteology and Myology of the Domestic Fowl, another on fossils, and a third again on the subject of arsenic and antimony. In September of that year he traveled to the Centennial Exposition in Philadelphia and used the trip to purchase six new microscopes to replace the two useless ones previously available to students; having had no instruction in their use, he turned for help to an engineer of the commuter train between Jackson, Michigan, and Ann Arbor who was an amateur microscopist, and in turn trained his own students.

Vaughan was nominated for promotion in 1877, but one of the university's regents accused him of atheism and refused to consider the promotion unless he denied it. Vaughan was not an atheist, but on principle refused to deny it, saying, "I decline to make a confession of faith ... The position concerns the teaching of science and has no relation to religious belief." He did not receive the promotion, (Note: Sources differ on whether Vaughan received the promotion. Adler says Vaughan was appointed in the end. Vaughan says in his autobiography that the regents postponed action and adjourned, and that another man was appointed in the fall. The proceedings of the Board of Regents show the matter being referred to the executive committee at the June 1877 meeting without further action, and the President's Report from that October makes no mention of Vaughan in the list of faculty changes.) but his stance met with the approval of two well-known members of the faculty, astronomer James Craig Watson and dean of the law school (and chief justice of the Michigan Supreme Court) Thomas M. Cooley. Watson published a local newspaper, and used it to excoriate the regents, while Cooley offered legal counsel if needed, and both men became friends of his.

=== Family ===
Vaughan married Dora Catherine Taylor in Huntsville, Missouri, on August 16, 1877. She was the daughter of a local merchant, George Warren Taylor. The Vaughans had five sons: Victor Clarence, John Walter, Herbert Hunter, Henry Frieze, and Warren Taylor Vaughan. All five sons served in the military during World War I, and the eldest, Victor C. Vaughan, Jr., drowned in France following the Armistice. Their fourth son, Henry Frieze Vaughan, named after long-time University of Michigan professor Henry S. Frieze, was co-founder and dean of the University of Michigan School of Public Health.

== Professor and dean at the University of Michigan ==
Vaughan continued his studies at the medical school and received his M.D. in 1878 as part of the last class to graduate from a 2-year curriculum before it became a 3-year program. He began a successful medical practice that lasted twenty years, but his primary interest remained in the laboratory. He was made an assistant professor in 1880, and in 1883 received a full professorship in physiological and pathological chemistry; he was the first to hold a chair of physiological chemistry—today known as biochemistry—in an American medical school.

=== Research ===
Vaughan's research was primarily in the areas of bacteriology and intoxication as the basis for disease, which he approached from a chemistry standpoint. He published over two hundred papers and books, and while many of his theories were later found to be incorrect, they were based on his experimental data.

==== Tyrotoxicons ====
Hundreds of cases of food poisoning caused by cheeses hit Michigan between 1883 and 1885, though none were fatal. Vaughan evaporated an alcoholic extract of a suspect cheese and ate some himself, noting mouth dryness and constriction of his throat. He purified it and noted a drop placed on his tongue caused burning, nausea, bowel pain, and diarrhea; he repeated this test both on himself and student volunteers. Purifying the substance further resulted in needle-shaped crystals he named tyrotoxicons. The name came from the Greek words for "cheese" and "poison", and he considered them to be a kind of ptomaine, then thought to be a type of chemical that caused food poisoning. An ice cream poisoning incident the following year confirmed his suspicions.

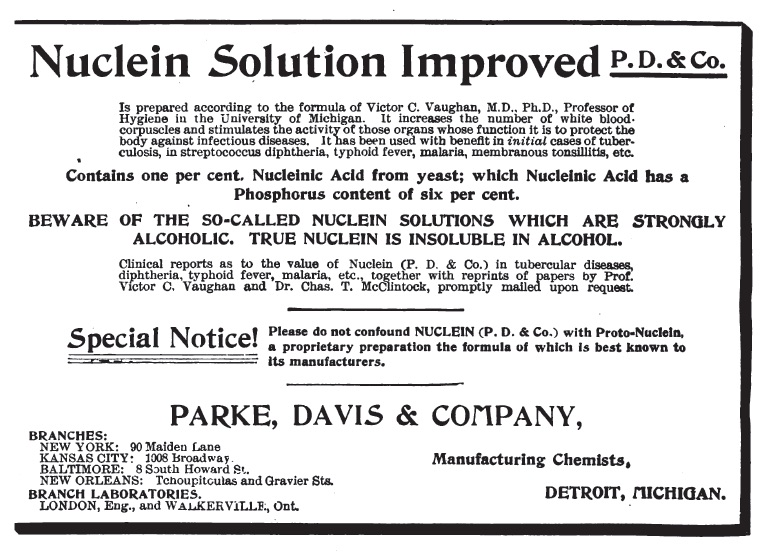
An ad for Vaughan's nuclein solution

Vaughan and Novy published a book in 1886, Ptomaines and Leucomaines, or the Putrefactive and Physiological Alkaloids, which grew to 604 pages by its third printing in 1896; this and numerous journal articles led to national attention for the university and recognition for Vaughan as a leading researcher on bacteriology. There were skeptics of the tyrotoxicon theory at the time, and the ptomaine theory itself began to lose credibility by the early 20th century, leading Vaughan to conclude in 1909 that, "practically nothing is known about the precise chemical nature of these bacterial poisons".

==== Nuclein ====
Vaughan became convinced that germicidal properties of serum was thanks to nuclein. He extracted nuclein from the blood of dogs and rabbits and tested it on animals, and found it made some rabbits immune to tuberculosis. He had similar results with anthrax, though others pointed out his solution of anthrax was probably too weak to make it a valid experiment. He tested nuclein on patients in his private practice, finding it effective on tonsilitis and other ailments. He believed he found success with it in treating tuberculosis, although a number of patients died anyway. George Dock, who treated many tuberculosis patients, tried the therapy for a couple years but did not find it very effective, calling it "something of a fad". Detroit pharmaceutical company Parke, Davis & Co., sold a nuclein therapy based on Vaughan's formulation from 1894 through at least 1913.

=== The Hygienic Laboratory ===
The germ theory of disease was not yet widely accepted in 1881 when Vaughan began teaching a new course he called Sanitary Science. He later renamed it Course on Hygiene and it covered topics such as germs, disease, antiseptics, quarantine, and vaccinations. In 1884 he petitioned the regents to establish a State Laboratory of Hygiene, but the request was denied. Later that year, Robert Koch published his four postulates and the germ theory of disease began to take on importance worldwide. Vaughan repeated his request in 1886 and this time the regents approved it; the following year, they requested $75,000 (about $1.8 million in 2016 terms) from the Michigan state legislature to fund the laboratory along with several other labs. After a lobbying effort by the university, professionals, pharmacists, and farmers, the legislature allocated $35,000 for the labs on June 24, 1887, and the university founded the Hygienic Laboratory, the first of its kind (Note: It predated the Hygienic Laboratory that became the National Institutes of Health by two months.) in the country.

While the laboratory was being constructed in the summer of 1888, Vaughan and Frederick George Novy went to Europe to study bacteriology in Koch's laboratory in Berlin. In addition to attending lectures, they purchased a complete set of Koch's laboratory equipment for the new lab in Ann Arbor. Before returning home, Vaughan visited the laboratory of Louis Pasteur, where Novy had gone to take in additional study. The lab was completed in 1889 and moved to a larger space in 1903; until 1907 it served as the official public health laboratory for the state of Michigan. Master's and doctorate degrees in public health were added in 1911, and the lab itself evolved into a full department in 1902, eventually becoming the Department of Microbiology & Immunology in 1979.

=== Dean of the medical school ===
Vaughan was named dean of the medical school in June 1891 following the resignation of Corydon Ford, though Vaughan had effectively been acting dean since the elderly Ford's appointment in 1887. Several recent deaths, resignations, and dismissals meant he needed to fill four professorships in short order. Vaughan wanted to find professors who could perform research in addition to their teaching duties, a change from previous expectations. Detroit doctor and university regent Hermann Kiefer traveled with Vaughan to several eastern cities to find candidates. After a couple false starts, they hired George Dock away from the University of Pennsylvania; Dock stayed on the faculty for nearly twenty years. Vaughan hired John Jacob Abel in 1891 and, when he left in 1893 to join the just-opened medical school at Johns Hopkins, Arthur Cushny to replace him. Vaughan continued to build the faculty he wanted, and by the turn of the century it was considered as good as any school's in the country.

Vaughan tightened admission requirements, only accepting students from high schools that had been certified by the University of Michigan or who had a comparable certificate from New York; it was still uncommon for students to have graduated from college before enrolling in the medical school. Starting in 1892, algebra, geometry, and French and German reading proficiency were all required skills. He expanded the curriculum from three years to four, in line with recent changes at Harvard, Columbia, and Penn. When it came to applicants, he was interested principally in academic qualifications and admitted both men and women. The number of Jewish students greatly increased in his time, and he recruited African-American students, which was very rare among white-dominated medical schools.

He oversaw the opening of the university's first hospital in 1892, having testified before the legislature's appropriations committee several years previously to help secure the funds. The growing spread of rabies in Michigan beginning around 1900 prompted Vaughan to push for the establishment of a Pasteur Institute branch in the state, which was the first in the U.S. west of New York.

Towards the end of Vaughan's tenure, poor planning and neglect of the hospital meant it did not compare favorably to newer ones on the east coast. He proposed, unsuccessfully, moving the clinical portion of the medical program to Detroit. In 1916 the regents asked the legislature for money for a new hospital, and Vaughan testified in favor of it, but the money was not appropriated until 1920. The internal medicine and surgery departments had no permanent leadership, and all attempts to fill the former had failed. Vaughan hired Hugh Cabot to lead the surgery department in 1919, and when Vaughan resigned in 1921, Cabot succeeded him.

=== Eugenics and sterilization ===
In the 1910s, Vaughan gave lectures at the university on the subject of eugenics. He believed that individuals exhibiting the "defective unit characters" of "alcoholism, feeblemindedness, epilepsy, insanity, pauperism and criminality" should be excluded from the "privilege ... of parenthood". He spoke in Battle Creek, Michigan, in 1914 at a statewide conference sponsored by the Race Betterment Foundation, a center of the eugenics movement that had been co-founded by the cereal magnate John Harvey Kellogg. Vaughan served on the organization's central committee, and was also serving as president of the state health board. The year before, he had endorsed a forced-sterilization law enacted by the Michigan state legislature; the law was challenged and thrown out as unconstitutional, though a similar law later passed in 1923 resulted in the forced sterilization of more than 3,000 people in the state.

== Associations, publishing, and government work ==
Vaughan was active in a number professional associations and governmental bodies. He was a leading member of the American Medical Association's (AMA) Council on Medication Education in 1904 when it revised medical education standards to put them on a scientific footing, and served as president of the AMA from 1914 to 1915. In 1915, he helped found the National Board of Medical Examiners with the goal of bringing consistency to the chaotic nature of medical licensing exams by providing a trusted set of tests that state licensing boards could use. He personally administered the first set of exams in October 1916.

He was appointed to the Michigan State Board of Health in 1883 and repeatedly reappointed through 1919, serving as president of the board for much of that period. He traveled extensively throughout the state in the course of his duties, logging 10,000 miles by railroad in the first six months of 1893 alone. He worked to establish a state laboratory to take over testing duties from his own Hygienic Laboratory in 1907 after the secretary of the University of Michigan had ordered him not to release reports to health officers who hadn't paid their fees. In 1915, he oversaw the creation of a traveling clinic to educate physicians throughout the state about the correct diagnosis of tuberculosis. The organizers of the Columbian Exposition in Chicago hired Vaughan as a consultant to ensure safe drinking water, given the city's high rates of typhoid fever; after deciding there was no way to purify enough Chicago city water for all the attendees, the commission he served on recommended building a pipeline from Waukesha, Wisconsin, and as a result there was no typhoid reported at the fair.

Vaughan helped found several journals, one of which is still being published as of 2018. In 1879, (Note: Vaughan's son gives 1888 as the founding date. The inaugural 1879 issue of the journal lists Vaughan as managing editor.) he was the founder and first editor of Physician and Surgeon, a monthly journal devoted to articles for general practitioners. He worked with publisher C. V. Mosby to found the Journal of Laboratory and Clinical Medicine, with the purpose of publishing scientific research along with techniques for applying it for use by practitioners; Vaughan was its first editor starting with the inaugural issue in October 1915. His son Warren later took over as editor of the journal, which continues to publish today as Translational Research. The AMA began publishing a popular magazine called Hygeia in 1923 with Vaughan as its first editor; it was renamed Today's Health in 1950 and continued to be published through 1976.

He was elected to the American Philosophical Society in 1909 and the National Academy of Sciences in 1915. After President Woodrow Wilson asked the academy in 1916 to create a National Research Council (NRC), Vaughan was named a member of its executive committee at its formation that September. He was also named the head of the medicine and hygiene committee, and spent the seven months before the U.S. entered the war on topics such as water sterilization, smallpox and typhoid fever vaccinations, medical supplies, diagnostic labs, and ear protection for soldiers. When war was declared in 1917, he left the NRC to rejoin the military as part of the Council of National Defense.

== Military service ==
Despite an abhorrence of war he attributed to his experience as a boy during the Civil War, Vaughan took leave of his academic duties twice in order to serve in the military, first in the Spanish–American War and then in World War I.

=== Spanish–American War ===
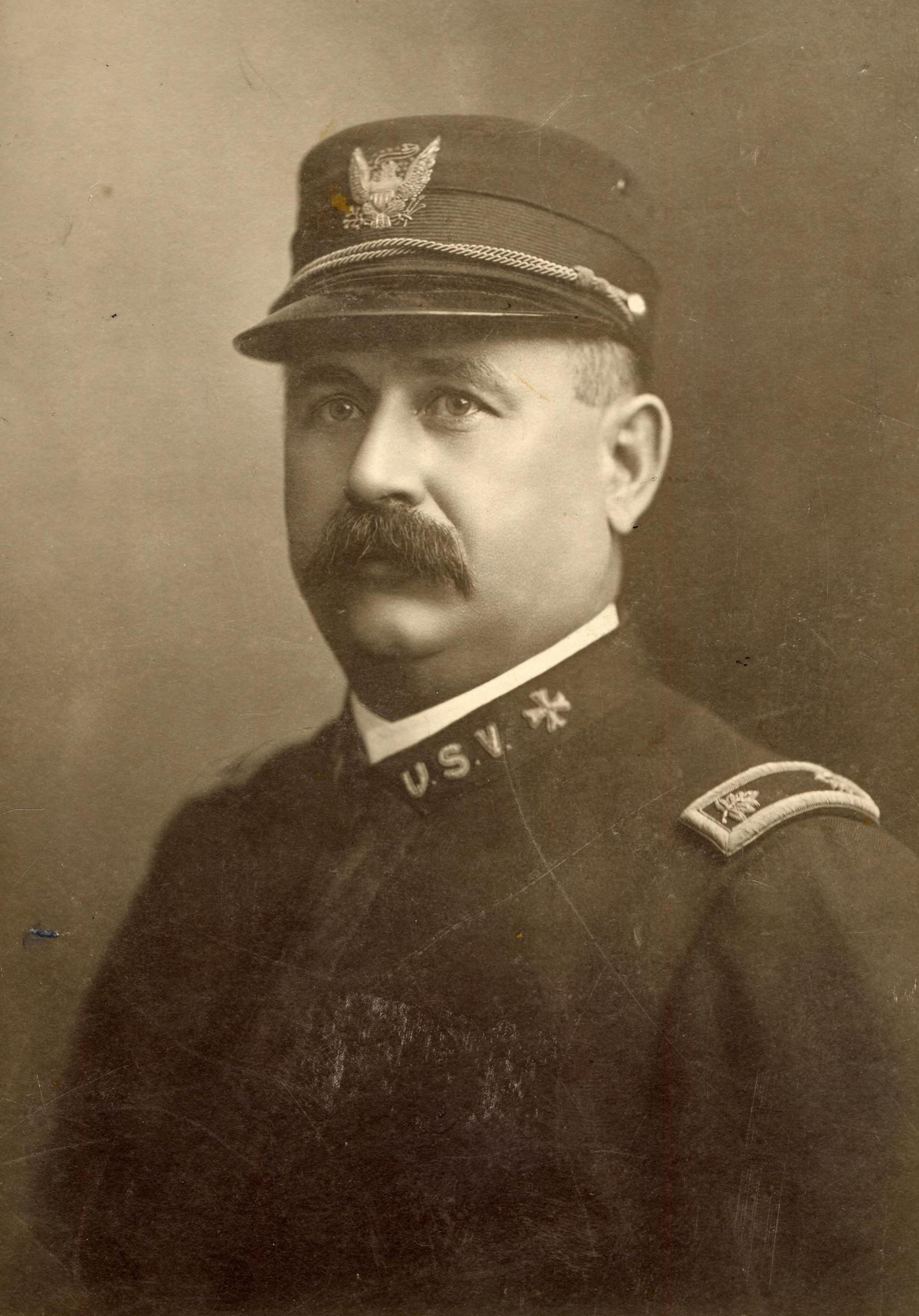
Victor C. Vaughan in Spanish–American War uniform, 1898

After the sinking of the Maine and declaration of war with Spain, Vaughan was asked by the University of Michigan's acting president, Harry Burns Hutchins, to speak at a student rally in the hopes of cooling the enthusiasm of students for leaving school and enlisting. Vaughan planned to oblige, but after listening to the speaker before him suggest that the students wait to see if enough unemployed men enlisted so that students wouldn't be needed, he became indignant and deviated from his planned remarks, saying, "God pity the country whose tramps must fight its battles ... I would rather see these walls crumble into dust than to see you hesitate when your country calls. You have duties to your parents, but your first duty is to serve your country." Governor Hazen S. Pingree called Vaughan the next day to say he had read the speech and signed Vaughan's commission. His unit, the 33rd Michigan Volunteer Infantry, left May 28, 1898, for Camp Alger, and shortly thereafter for Cuba.

Major Vaughan's unit sailed on the USS Yale, previously a luxury liner, to Siboney, Cuba; he chose its second-class dining room as his hospital and operating room. Within a week he briefly came under fire in the Battle of Santiago and was one of a dozen surgeons who treated over 1600 men in the aftermath; he received a citation for gallantry on the field of battle. (Note: The citation was issued 26 years after the battle, leading Vaughan to comment, "Uncle Sam may be slow in conferring honors but he seldom wholly forgets.") Yellow fever broke out shortly afterwards, and Vaughan contracted it; he survived under the care of Major William Gorgas, but lost 60 pounds over the course of his illness and was sent to New York by way of Florida, despite an initial desire to stay in Cuba and continue working now that he had immunity to the disease.

==== The typhoid commission ====
When Vaughan reached New York, the Surgeon General appointed him and Major Edward Shakespeare to a commission headed by Major Walter Reed to investigate typhoid fever. Nearly 21,000 cases of typhoid fever had been reported among U.S. troops between May and September 1898, resulting in about 1,600 deaths out of about 273,000 soldiers who had served. The commission visited a number of army camps and frequently found unsanitary conditions, including latrines that flooded into areas where soldiers slept, transport of urine and feces in open tubs that splashed near living and food preparation areas, and poor handling of food supplies and food waste.

Their research lasted through June 1899. Since Shakespeare died in 1900 and Reed in 1902, Vaughan was largely responsible for the two-volume final report published in 1904, which provided significant new understanding in how typhoid was spread by flies and direct contact, as well as in how to prevent it through proper sanitary techniques. He took up the study of typhoid for the military again in 1908, serving on a board that recommended compulsory anti-typhoid inoculations for troops. The combination of sanitation and vaccinations meant that of the 4 million troops involved in World War I, only 1,529 hospital admissions were due to typhoid fever.

=== World War I ===
Even with his distaste for war, Vaughan termed the delay in the United States joining World War I a "national disgrace". He and all five of his sons were commissioned in 1917. The Council of National Defense created the General Medical Board on April 2, 1917, and Vaughan was appointed to its executive committee along with Gorgas (by then the Surgeon General of the Army), three other officers, and five doctors: Surgeon General William C. Braisted, Surgeon General Rupert Blue, Admiral Cary T. Grayson, Franklin H. Martin, Frank F. Simpson, William J. Mayo, Charles H. Mayo, and William H. Welch.

Gorgas had successfully lobbied Congress to remove a prohibition on reserve medical officers being promoted above major, and Vaughan was soon promoted to colonel and put in charge of the communicable diseases division. Disease was a major problem with the early mobilization effort; measles was the leading cause of mortality in the army during 1917, and from September 1917 to March 1918 the death rate for pneumonia at the most populous army camps was twelve times that of the general population. Vaughan, Gorgas, and William H. Welch toured camps, finding overcrowding and poor facilities, and the publicity surrounding Gorgas's reports led Congress to hold hearings that led to increased medical staffing and some improvements in conditions. But the largest challenge the military faced was influenza.

The outbreak of influenza, first at Camp Kearny in December 1917, and then at Camp Funston in March and April, became a major issue when thousands of troops became ill at Camp Devens in September, with nearly 750 dying. Vaughan and Welch were dispatched there to investigate. Vaughan observed that this strain of influenza, rather than attacking the very young and very old, was killing men in prime physical condition, leading him to warn, "If the epidemic continues its mathematical rate of acceleration, civilization could easily disappear from the face of the earth." By the time the epidemic ran its course, over a million troops were afflicted with influenza, and 30,000 of them died; 675,000 people died in the United States as a whole.

== Retirement and later life ==
Following his resignation as dean on June 30, 1921, Vaughan accepted a one-year appointment as chairman of the Division of Medical Sciences at the National Research Council. The Vaughans moved to Chevy Chase, Maryland for the duration of the appointment, until October 1922, during which time he also published a two-volume work, Epidemiology and Public Health. They then moved to Chicago while he helped launch Hygeia in 1923. They spent the following winter in Washington, D.C., and from October 1924 to May 1925 they made a cross-country trip from Florida to California to Portland, Oregon, and finally back to their cottage at Old Mission, Michigan. He returned to Washington in September 1925 to again head the Division of Medical Sciences, and the following year published his autobiography, A Doctor's Memories.

Vaughan and his wife traveled to Tokyo in October and November 1926, when he was a delegate to the Third Pan-Pacific Science Congress, and also visited China and the Philippines. He suffered a mild stroke upon his return home, and never again regained full health. He died of a sudden heart attack in Richmond on November 21, 1929, at the age of 78. He was cremated and buried at Forest Lawn Cemetery in Detroit.

== Legacy ==
=== Awards ===
- Chevalier of the French Legion of Honor
- George M. Kober medal from the Association of American Physicians
- Distinguished Service Medal, for his "meritorious and conspicuous service".

=== Commemoration ===
- 1903: A Festschrift in the form of a 620-page volume of research was compiled in Vaughan's honor on the 25th anniversary of his doctorate.
- 1929: The Victor Vaughan Society for the History and Philosophy of Medicine was established by medical students at the University of Michigan in order to "promote intellectual inquiry and discourse on important issues in medicine, both past and present".
- 1938: Victor Vaughan Dormitory was opened on the University of Michigan campus as a home for medical students; today it houses administrative offices for the medical program.
- 1943: Vaughan General Hospital was a temporary army hospital that started operation in July 1943 and served over 12,000 patients until the end of World War II. The site was turned back over to the Department of Veterans Affairs and is now occupied by the Edward Hines Jr. Veterans Administration Hospital.
- 1943: The Liberty ship SS Victor C. Vaughan was launched on September 12, 1943, in Portland, Oregon.
