= Herman Kiefer Hospital =

Coordinates: 42°22′40.1″N 83°05′27.0″W

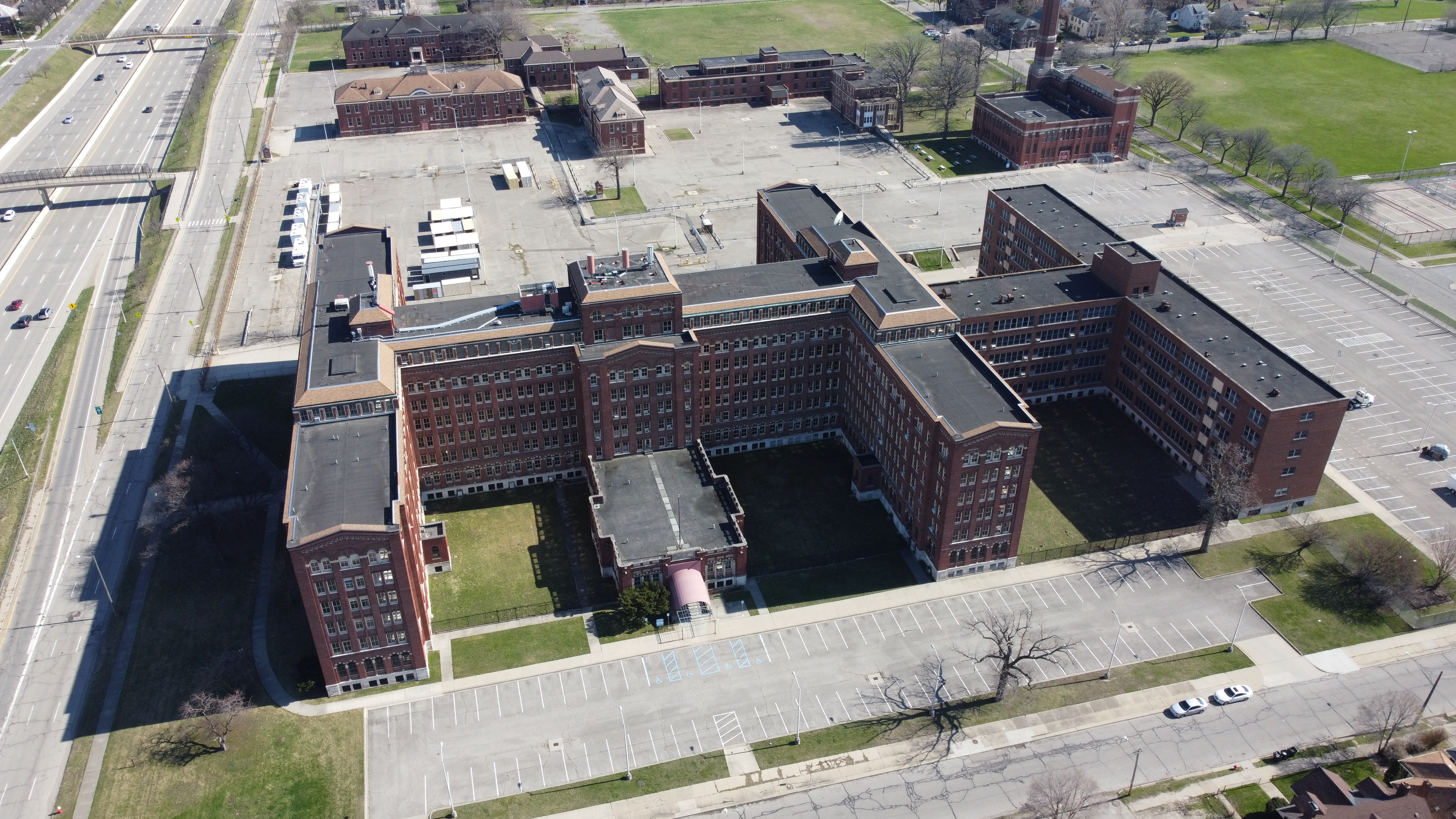

Herman Kiefer Hospital was a city-owned hospital in Detroit, Michigan, from 1911 to 2013. It was founded to serve as a public health hospital; to combat rampant infectious diseases, such as tuberculosis, diphtheria, scarlet fever, mumps, measles, and other diseases. It was named after Herman Kiefer, a prominent local physician known for treating the poor.

== History ==
The first public health facility on the site was opened in 1886 as a smallpox hospital on the outskirts of the city. In 1892, it burned down in a fire deemed "suspicious.". Over the next twenty years, several "tent" hospitals were constructed on the site, each dedicated to treating a specific infectious disease—scarlet fever, diphtheria and tuberculosis. In 1909, six more tents were added, leading to plans to begin to build a permanent structure.

The first permanent structures, pavilions, designed by architect George Mason, opened in 1911. By the mid 1920s, Detroit voters approved a $3-million bond issue, to build a brick and cement hospital. This building, designed by Albert Kahn in Neo-Romanesque Revival style, was 424,000 square feet, and had 500 beds in single, or double, rooms, instead of the, then standard, 10-bed wards. This new building opened in December 1928. By 1932, it had 1,200 beds.

== Hospital ==
The hospital was the primary health care facility of the City of Detroit from its founding to closure. During its 75 years, it treated the poorest citizens of the city. For the first 35 years, most patients had infectious diseases. In 1953, a 250-bed addition was added to treat tuberculosis. By the end of the 1960s, the era of infectious diseases was over due to antibiotics and vaccines. In 1928, there were 1,756 deaths from infectious diseases, in 1969, there were under 100. During the 1970s, the patient population changed to the very old, the indigent, and those who had social problems.

In 1951, the Rehabilitation Institute of Metropolitan Detroit was founded at Herman Kiefer Hospital. Kiefer Hospital was the main treatment facility for polio in Detroit, which was rampant at that time. Polio patients are often paralyzed, and the Kiefer provided their polio patients with rehabilitation. It was also the site of the Metropolitan Detroit Polio Foundation, which merged with the Rehabilitation Institute in 1953. These two partners soon realized they needed a building of their own to house all their services. As a result, in 1958, the Rehabilitation Institute moved to a newly built hospital at the Detroit Medical Center.

During the 1970s and early 1980s, part of the building was used for the Detroit Psychiatric Institute, providing inpatient and outpatient services to those having psychiatric difficulties. This part of the hospital was overseen by the State of Michigan Department of Mental Health.

== Closure ==
By the early 21st century, the Kiefer was acting almost entirely as a public health facility, dispensing free vaccinations. With the City of Detroit facing bankruptcy, Mayor Dave Bing decided that the $1 million maintenance cost of the aging building could not be afforded. Bing closed the hospital, transferring its public health services to a private nonprofit which operated throughout the city from neighborhood facilities. Under Mayor Mike Duggan, the Detroit Health Department was reformed under the leadership of Dr. Abdul El-Sayed and now operates essential local public health services.

== Redevelopment ==
In June 2015, plans were announced for the redevelopment of the building, and other buildings in the complex, into a mixed use residential, business, and commercial center.

== See also ==
- Herman Kiefer
