= Rehabilitation Institute of Michigan =

- Detroit Medical Center

Geography
- Location: 261 Mack Avenue; Detroit, Michigan, United States
- Coordinates: 42.34962°N 83.05569°W

Organization
- Type: Specialist

Services
- Beds: 94
- Speciality: Rehabilitation

History
- Founded: 1951

Links
- Website: www.rimrehab.org
- Lists: Hospitals in Michigan

DMC Rehabilitation Institute of Michigan (RIM) is one of the eight hospitals affiliated with the Detroit Medical Center. RIM is one of the largest, academic, rehabilitation hospitals in the United States specializing in rehabilitation medicine and research. RIM offers clinical treatment in spinal cord injury, brain injury, stroke, complex trauma and orthopedics and catastrophic injury care. The institute is home to the Center for Spinal Cord Injury Recovery, a facility designed to implement and study innovative treatments in spinal cord injury recovery.

RIM also houses the Southeastern Michigan Traumatic Brain Injury System (SEMTBIS) which conducts groundbreaking research in the field of rehabilitation medicine, sharing the resulting innovations with brain injury providers worldwide. Clinical researchers study issues such as medication effects, course of recovery, psychological factors and treatment outcomes.

RIM also operates over 30 outpatient therapy clinics throughout southeast Michigan, specializing in physical therapy, sports medicine and orthopedics.

== History ==
In 1951, Rehabilitation Institute of Metropolitan Detroit was founded at the Herman Kiefer Hospital in Detroit. This was also the site of the Metropolitan Detroit Polio Foundation, which merged with the Rehabilitation Institute in 1953. These two partners soon realized they needed a building of their own to house all their services. As a result, in 1958, the Rehabilitation Institute moved to a newly built hospital at its current location at 261 Mack Avenue, in Detroit.

== Services ==
During the last 10 years, RIM has been awarded $16 million in federal and private grants for rehabilitation research focusing on restoring function, improving quality of life and developing innovative therapeutic techniques.

Today, RIM is considered a national leader in the field of physical medicine and rehabilitation. With its 94-bed inpatient hospital and numerous outpatient sites located throughout southeastern Michigan, RIM is also one of the nation's largest freestanding rehabilitation hospitals.

== Clinical Specialties ==
Clinical Specialties at RIM include:

- Amputee Services
- Aquatic Therapy
- Assistive Technology
- Balance Disorders
- Brain Injury Services
- Cancer Rehabilitation
- Dysphagia
- Electromyography (EMG)
- Hand Therapy
- Lymphedema Therapy
- Multiple Sclerosis
- Muscle Energy Technique
- Myofascial Release
- Neuro Rehabilitation
- Occupational Therapy
- Orthotics
- Pediatric Rehabilitation
- Physical Therapy
- Recreational Therapy
- Rehabilitation Psychology & Neuropsychology
- Return-to-Work Services
- Spasticity Management
- Speech-Language Pathology
- Spinal Cord Injury Services
- Sports Medicine and Rehabilitation
- Stroke Services
- Temporomandibular joint dysfunction
- Vestibular Rehabilitation
- Wheelchair Services
- Women's Rehab

== Brasza Outpatient and Fitness Center ==
RIM's Brasza Outpatient Center is a state of the art, multi-level fitness center. It houses modern fitness equipment, a free-weight area, running tracks and studios offering a variety of programs, from group exercise and wheelchair mobility training, to community education. The center also includes a sports medicine program directed by therapists and athletic trainers.

Brasza Outpatient and Fitness Center Services Include:

- Sports Medicine
- Orthopedic Therapy
- Personal Training
- Post Rehab Training
- Sports Specific Training
- Massage
- Work Hardening
- Women's rehab
- Lymphedema Therapy
- Cardiac Rehabilitation (Phase II / Phase III)

== Center for Spinal Cord Injury Recovery ==
The Center for Spinal Cord Injury Recovery (CSCIR) is a unique, state-of-art clinical facility, offering an intensive physical therapy program focused on maximizing recovery from spinal cord injury. The program incorporates therapeutic techniques based on the newest information available from emerging research around the globe.

== Accreditation ==
RIM is fully accredited by the Joint Commission on Accreditation of Healthcare Organizations and the Commission on Accreditation for Rehabilitation Facilities (CARF).
