= Joneigh Khaldun =

American health official

Joneigh S. Khaldun MD MPH FACEP
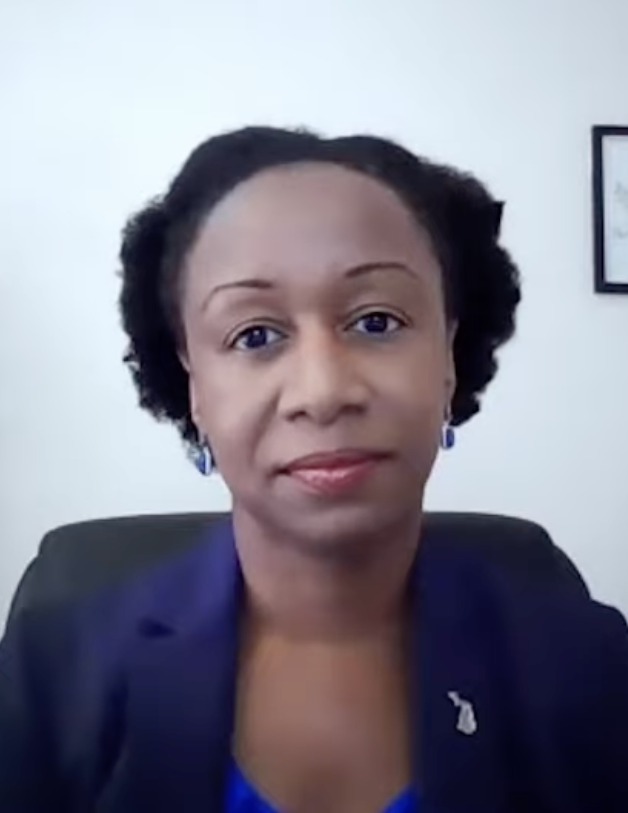

Chief Medical Executive of Michigan Department of Health and Human Services
- In office April 15, 2019 – October 2021
- Appointed by: Gretchen Whitmer
- Preceded by: position established

Executive Director and Health Officer of the Detroit Health Department
- In office January 2017 – March 2019
- Appointed by: Mike Duggan
- Preceded by: Abdul El-Sayed
- Succeeded by: Denise Fair

Personal details
- Born: Ann Arbor, Michigan
- Education: University of Michigan, BS (2002); University of Pennsylvania, MD (2006); George Washington University, MPH (2013)
- Current Workplace: Chief Health Equity Officer, CVS Health

Joneigh Khaldun is an American health official who has been President and CEO of the Public Health Accreditation Board since January 2025. Prior to that, she was the Vice President and Chief Health Equity Officer at CVS Health. Previously she served as the Chief Medical Executive for the State of Michigan and Chief Deputy Director for Health in the Michigan Department of Health and Human Services. On February 10, 2021, she was announced as a member of the COVID-19 Health Equity Task Force under the Biden-Harris administration.

== Education ==
Khaldun grew up in Ann Arbor, Michigan. After graduating from Ann Arbor Pioneer High School in 1998, she attended the University of Michigan for her undergraduate studies, where she received her Bachelor of Science degree in biology in 2002. She then attended the Perelman School of Medicine at the University of Pennsylvania, where she received her Medical Degree in 2006. She completed her residency in emergency medicine at SUNY Downstate Medical Center in 2010 before attending the George Washington University, where she completed her Master of Public Health degree in 2013.

== Career ==
In July 2016, Khaldun was appointed as the medical director of the Detroit Health Department by Mayor Mike Duggan and was later named executive director and health officer in January 2017. In April 2019, Khaldun assumed the position of Chief Medical Executive and Chief Deputy for Health at the Michigan Department of Health and Human Services, appointed by Governor Gretchen Whitmer in whose cabinet Khaldun also served. In October 2021, CVS Health announced Khaldun would become the Vice President and Chief Health Equity Officer of the organization.

=== COVID-19 response ===
In her role at the Michigan Department of Health and Human Services (DHHS), Khaldun has served as the chief strategist for the state's response to the COVID-19 pandemic, including implementing measures to address racial disparities, as SARS-CoV-2 and the associated disease have disproportionately impacted communities of color across the nation. Under Khaldun's leadership, Michigan became one of the first states to release COVID-19 case data by race, which revealed that Black residents were overrepresented in diagnoses and deaths. In response to these disparities, Michigan Governor Gretchen Whitmer formed the Coronavirus Task Force on Racial Disparities, on which Khaldun serves. The task force has since directed Michigan DHHS to declare racism a public health crisis in Michigan and develop implicit bias trainings. They have also expanded COVID testing and worked to build partnerships between impacted communities and health care providers.

In February 2021, she was tapped to serve on the Biden-Harris administration's COVID-19 Health Equity Task Force, which has been tasked with address health disparities that have arisen during the COVID-19 pandemic and develop strategies to promote equity in testing, prevention measures, and health outcomes.

== Awards and honors ==
- 40 Under 40 Leaders in Minority Health Award, National Minority Quality Forum, 2018
- 40 Under 40 Leaders in Public Health Award, De Beaumont Foundation, 2019
- Notable Woman in Health and Newsmaker of the Year, Crain's Detroit, 2020
- USA Today's Women of the Year for 2022
