= Edward Hines Jr. Veterans Administration Hospital =

Hospital in Cook County, Illinois, United States

- Edward Hines Jr. Veterans Administration Hospital Historic District
- U.S. National Register of Historic Places
- U.S. Historic district
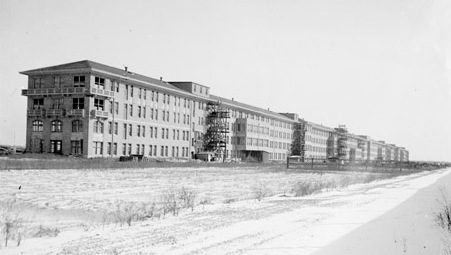
- Main Infirmary Building shortly after construction

- Location within Illinois Location within the United States
- Location: 5000 South 5th Avenue, Hines, Illinois
- Coordinates: 41°51′40″N 87°50′29″W
- Area: 45 acres (18 ha)
- Architects: Schmidt, Garden and Martin; H. B. Wheelock
- Architectural style: Colonial Revival, Neoclassical
- NRHP reference No.: 13000814
- Added to NRHP: October 9, 2013

The Edward Hines Jr. Veterans Administration Hospital is a second-generation Veterans Health Administration hospital in Cook County, Illinois, United States. It encompasses 174 acres (70 ha) on its campus and leases an additional 60 acres (24 ha) to the Loyola University Medical Center.

Construction began in 1918 on land donated by the Edward Hines Lumber Company that was originally Speedway Park, a board track racecourse. The building was originally intended to house casualties from World War I, and Hines wanted the building to serve as a hospital after the war. Hines was successful in lobbying the United States Congress to take over the facility as a veterans hospital in 1920. In 2013, 45 acres (18 ha) of the campus, including the Old Airmail and Postal Service Buildings from the Maywood Air Mail Field, were listed on the National Register of Historic Places as a historic district.

== History ==
=== Speedway Park and early developments ===
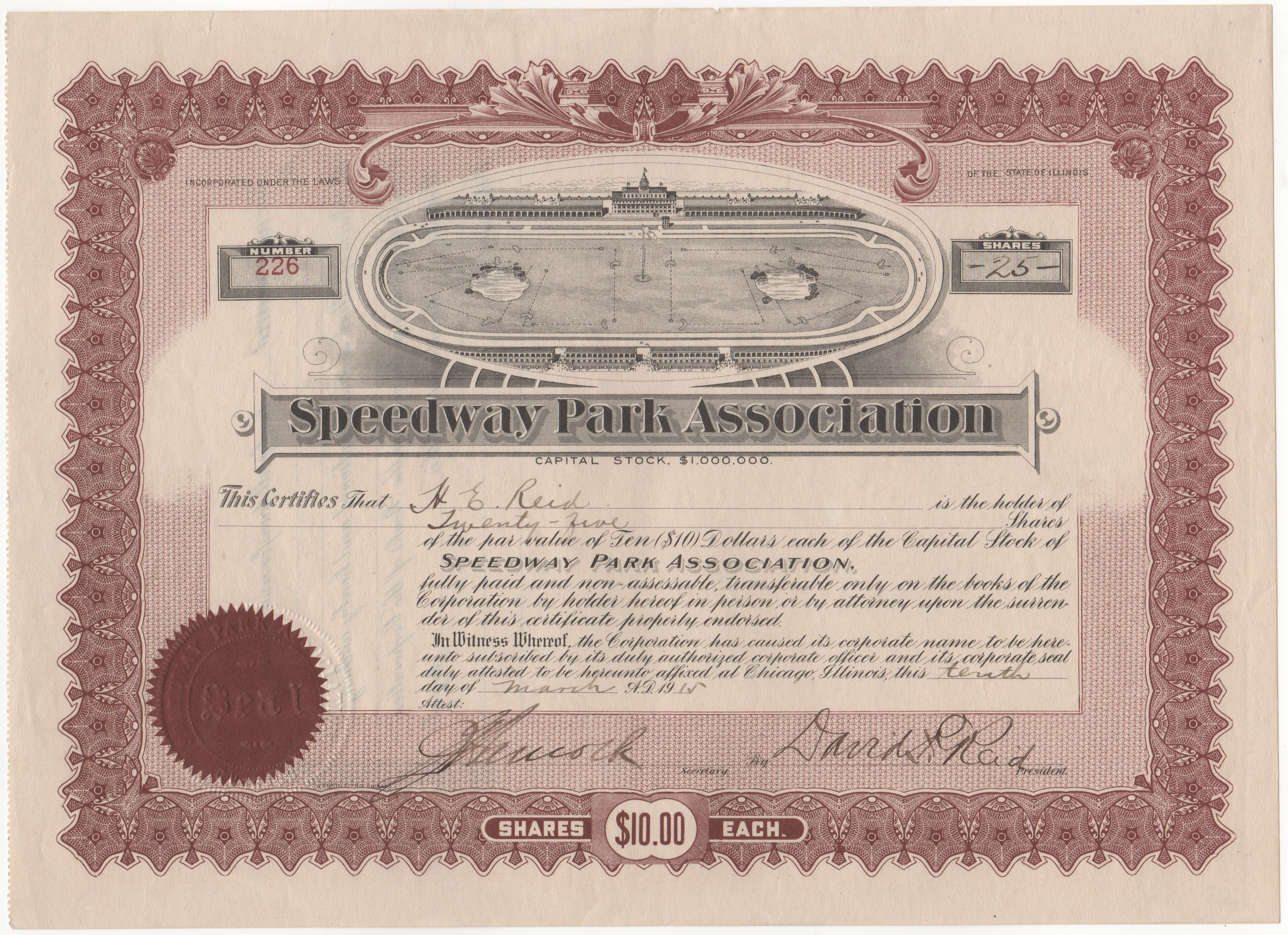
Share of the Speedway Park Association, issued March 10, 1915

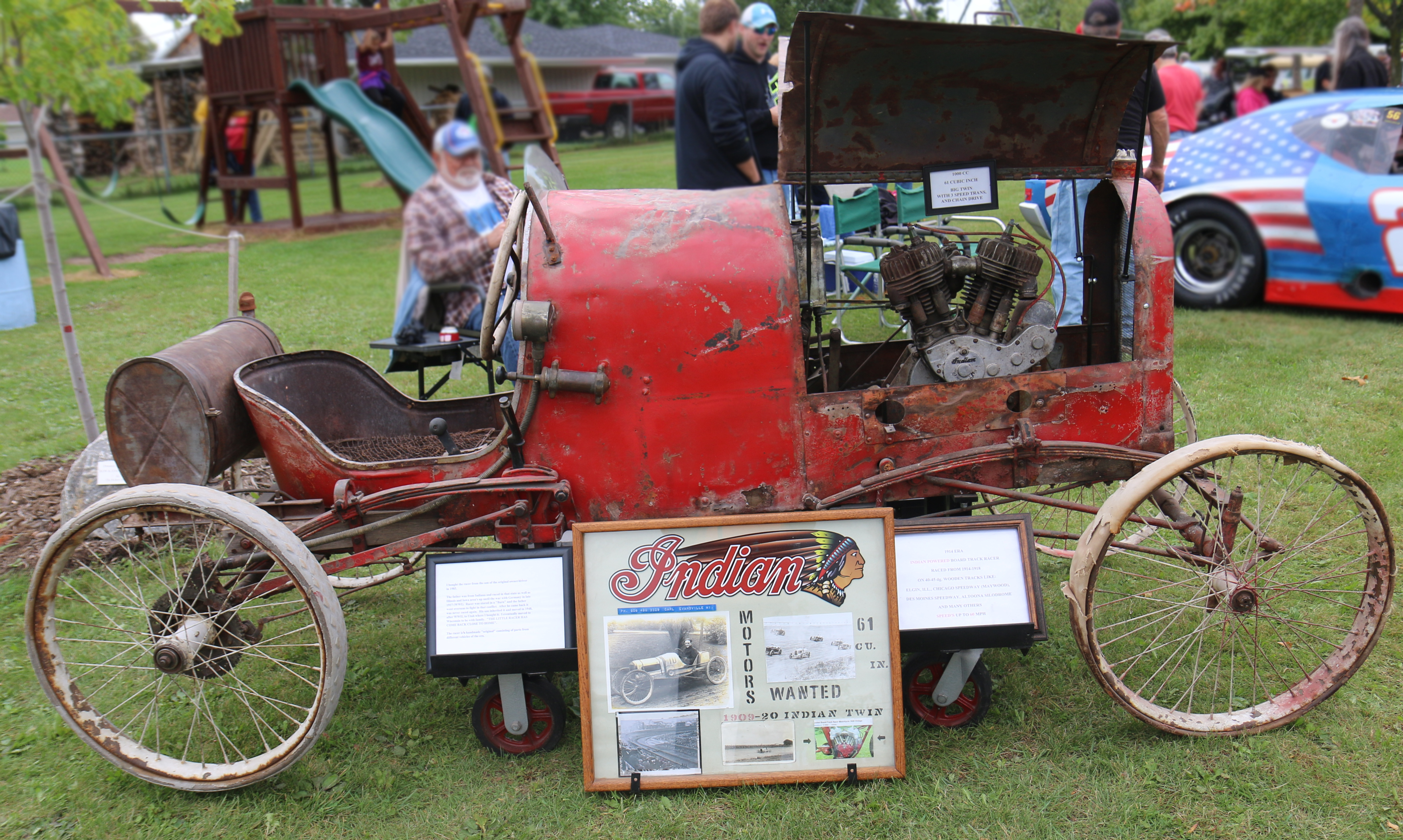
Car raced at Speedway Park

The land occupied by Edward Hines Jr. VA Hospital has a history dating to the nineteenth century. After being sold by the U.S. government to Frederick Bronson in 1835, the property was used primarily for agriculture until the early twentieth century. In 1914, the Speedway Park Association purchased approximately 320 acres and developed a two-mile wooden board track that became one of the longest automobile racing tracks in the United States. The organization built a 2-mile (3.2 km) oval wooden track on the land and held races starting in June 1915. The track was one of the longest board tracks in the United States. The course was host to a number of national and international racing competitions featuring competitors such as Barney Oldfield, Ralph DePalma, Louis Chevrolet, and Dario Resta. The track was initially very successful, attracting as many as 45,000 spectators. However, the entry of the United States into World War I in April 1917 doomed the financial viability of the racetrack. It was one of the first board tracks to close; most board tracks in the United States were closed by the end of the 1930s. The facility attracted major racers including Barney Oldfield, Ralph DePalma, Louis Chevrolet, and Dario Resta before closing after the United States entered World War I in 1917.

=== Early history ===
The course was purchased in December 1917 by the Edward Hines Lumber Company on behalf of Edward Hines Sr. Once the United States entered World War I, the City of Chicago sought a site for a temporary military hospital. Edward Hines Jr. was killed on the front lines in France in the opening months of American involvement in the war. In December 1917, Edward Hines Sr. acquired the property. Following the death of his son, Edward Hines Jr., in France during World War I in June 1918, Hines donated land for the establishment of a hospital for veterans. Public Health Service Hospital No. 76 was commissioned in 1918, and construction of the facility was completed at a cost of approximately $5 million, including both federal appropriations and contributions from the Hines family. The first patient was admitted on August 8, 1921. The Field Museum of Natural History was also considered as a location for the facility. However, it was feared that the conversion of the museum to a medical facility would prove too costly.

The campus also played a role in early aviation history. Air mail operations were based on the grounds during the 1920s, and Charles Lindbergh piloted the inaugural Chicago-to-St. Louis air mail flight on April 15, 1926. Several former air mail buildings on the campus later became recognized for their historic significance.

The hospital was designed as the first fireproof hospital building in the nation, and was intended to be used to treat Veterans during the war and then operate as a public hospital after its conclusion. Schmidt, Garden and Martin and H. B. Wheelock were awarded the commission to design the facility, and the Shank Company was tasked with its construction.

When World War I ended in November 1918, the agreement with Hines was terminated as there was no longer a need to house casualties. The hospital stood partially constructed for the next two years as Hines led an effort to lobby Congress to have the building taken over by the United States Public Health Service. Secretary of the Treasury Carter Glass disapproved of the plan because no official contract was signed between Hines and the federal government. However, an investigation by the United States Department of War found sufficient evidence of a verbal agreement between the two parties. With help from Congressmen Adolph J. Sabath, James Robert Mann, Martin B. Madden, and Carl R. Chindblom, a Senate vote on the matter passed 33 to 27. $3.4 million was appropriated to the project under the condition that Hines provided an additional $1.6 million. The transfer was approved in March 1920 and construction recommenced.

The campus was originally known as U.S. Public Health Service Hospital Number 76, and was popularly referred to as Speedway Hospital or Broadview Hospital.

On October 24, 1921, President Warren G. Harding designated the facility as Edward Hines Jr. Memorial Hospital, making it the first American public hospital named after an person, living or deceased. A formal dedication ceremony took place on November 6, 1921, attended by Marshal Ferdinand Foch and Senator Medill McCormick.

The first patient was admitted on August 8, 1921. A dedication ceremony was held on November 6, 1921, led by Marshal of France Ferdinand Foch and Senator Medill McCormick. A portrait of Foch is still displayed in the entrance of the hospital's Building 2.

=== 1920s–1940s expansions ===
The Main Infirmary Building was capable of housing a thousand beds, and by February 1922, was already near capacity. The unique building was only 50 feet (15 m) wide, but 2,040 feet (620 m) long so that every room could have sunlight. It was also the largest fireproof hospital in the nation, and featured many state-of-the-art technologies such as an electric call system and an x-ray department. Seven other buildings were erected during initial construction in 1921: the Morgue and Utility Shops; the Recreational and Library Building; the Kitchen, Chapel, and Social Service Building; the Power House; the Subsistence Building; the Garage; and the Supply Depot. The facility was transferred from the Public Health Service to the recently created Veterans Bureau in April 1922. By 1925, the campus saw over 3,100 admissions per year.

In May 1928, President Calvin Coolidge approved a $15 million appropriation to improve veterans health facilities, including $1.1 million for Hines. With this money, the hospital was able to renovate its staff quarters into tuberculosis and behavioral health wards. They also built a new administration building and employee housing, thus opening more space in the Main Infirmary Building, increasing its capacity to 1,600. It was also at this point that the hospital grounds were extensively landscaped with a sunken garden, a new street lighting system, a new east entrance, and new drives. The landscaping is attributed to Jens Jensen, although it is uncertain if Jensen's design was ever implemented. On July 26, 1931, the Doughboy Fountain was donated by the Cook County American Legion Auxiliary in honor of World War I veterans. A memorial to Medal of Honor recipient George Dilboy, who was killed in the war, was unveiled in 1942. Hines Hospital became the national leader in surgery for veterans facilities, performing over 14,600 procedures per year by 1935.

=== World War II ===
During World War II, a new eighty-three building complex was built adjacent to the property with a $4.5 million appropriation. Known as the Vaughan General Hospital, after Victor C. Vaughan, it was built on the 102-acre (41 ha) grounds of the former Maywood Air Mail Field to serve the needs of the Army. The first patient was admitted on August 1, 1944.

Colonel Victor C. Vaughan, U.S. Army Medical Corps and former dean at the University of Michigan Medical School, played a critical role in the Army’s medical efforts during the Spanish-American War and World War I. The President of the United States awarded him the Army Distinguished Service Medal, authorized by an Act of Congress on July 9, 1918, for exceptionally meritorious and distinguished service during World War I. His contributions, particularly in the Office of the Surgeon General, were vital in controlling communicable diseases, including efforts during the influenza epidemic. Vaughan’s expertise and leadership had a lasting impact on military medicine and influenced the development of Veteran medical facilities like Hines VA Hospital.

The 64-building Vaughn campus was added to the Hines complex after the war in April 1946, increasing the capacity of Hines from 1,600 to 3,253 beds. The new campus also afforded Hines the opportunity to manufacture some of its medical equipment and establish a medical research division. In 1946, Hines partnered with five medical schools to become a training center.

During the same period, Hines expanded its academic affiliations and became a major training center for medical education. The hospital's first medical school affiliation was established with Northwestern University in 1944, and by 1946 it was working with multiple medical schools. In 1962, 60 acres (24 ha) of the Vaughan campus were leased to Loyola University Chicago Stritch School of Medicine to build a new medical school.

=== Blind Rehabilitation at Hines VA Hospital ===
During World War II, significant advances occurred in the United States. In 1944, Richard E. Hoover, a rehabilitation specialist at Valley Forge Army Hospital, developed what would become known as the “long cane” technique. Hoover, now regarded as the “Father of the Lightweight Long Cane Technique,” pioneered the method of swinging the cane from the centerline of the body to detect obstacles, and he arranged for lightweight, long white canes to be produced for blinded veterans. This method, also known as the Hoover Method, became the standard in blind mobility training.

==== Founding of the Hines Blind Rehabilitation Center ====
After World War II, the U.S. Department of Veterans Affairs recognized the need for specialized rehabilitation for blinded veterans. In 1948, Edward Hines Jr. VA Hospital in Illinois opened the nation’s first Blind Rehabilitation Center. The center was initially staffed by former instructors from Valley Forge, including Russell C. Williams, a blinded World War II veteran who became the center’s first chief. Williams, blinded by a German artillery attack soon after landing on the beaches of Normandy in 1944, brought a unique perspective as both a veteran and a person with visual impairment. His leadership and real-world experience were instrumental in shaping the center’s philosophy and training programs. Williams emphasized the importance of adapting both practical skills and psychological outlook, famously telling new patients, “The idea underlying the Hines program is that one must change certain ways of performing and thinking when sight is gone. Hines provides the opportunity for learning these changed ways and making them a habit.”

==== Innovations in Rehabilitation Techniques ====
At Hines, Williams and his team continued to refine mobility techniques. They adapted the long white cane, adjusting its length to the individual, adding a plastic tip for sensitivity, and improving the grip for better control in all weather conditions. The team also developed new methods for navigation and environmental awareness, leveraging sound and spatial cues. These innovations became part of a comprehensive curriculum that addressed the whole person, combining medical practices, training techniques, and psychological support to foster independence.

The long cane, initially considered a novelty, gained widespread acceptance and became central to mobility training at Hines and beyond. Millions of people worldwide have since benefited from the use of the long white cane. Since its founding, the Hines Blind Rehabilitation Center has served more than 10,000 veterans. In 2005, the center moved into a new, modern facility with the capacity to treat up to 34 patients at a time with a staff of approximately 50. The program offers individualized rehabilitation covering five key areas: living skills, computer access training, visual skills, manual skills, and mobility and orientation. Today, the Hines VA Blind Rehabilitation Center remains a leader in the field, upholding the vision of its founders to empower visually impaired veterans to live independently and fully participate in society.

=== 1950-1999 ===
In 1962, the Department of Health, Education, and Welfare transferred 31 acres (13 ha) of the Hines property to the State of Illinois Department of Mental Health so that they could build a new mental health facility. The John J. Madden Clinic took over mental health operations from the hospital, allowing Hines to re-purpose 280 beds to intensive care. A 120-bed Nursing Home Care Unit was completed in 1982 to treat aging veterans of the two World Wars. By the early 1990s, the complex had sixty-two buildings, including one of five Blind Rehabilitation Centers in the Veterans Affairs network. An eighteen-bedroom Ronald McDonald House was added in 1995. By 1996, the facility had serviced 900,000 patients.

==== Academic Affiliation with Loyola University Chicago ====
In 1962, 60 acres (24 ha) of the Vaughan campus were leased to Loyola University Chicago Stritch School of Medicine to build a new medical school. The 451-bed Foster G. McGraw Hospital, later known as the Loyola University Medical Center, opened on May 29, 1969. This partnership allowed Hines to have one of the most comprehensive residency programs among veterans hospitals.

==== First to Link Cigarette Smoking and Cancer ====
During the early 1950s, Dr. Robert Schrek, a pathologist at the Hines VA facility, conducted groundbreaking research that established a direct link between tobacco smoking and cancers of the lungs, larynx, and pharynx. Prior to Schrek’s findings, most experts attributed the increase in lung cancer cases to environmental pollutants, overlooking the prevalence of smoking as a primary factor. Schrek’s conclusions sparked considerable debate until further evidence was provided by Dr. Oscar Auerbach, a VA researcher at the East Orange, New Jersy, hospital. Auerbach conclusively demonstrated the harmful effects of smoking by inducing lung cancer and other pathological changes in animals trained to smoke cigarettes over a three-year period. He also established the increased risk of lung cancer in individuals exposed to second-hand smoke.

==== Vietnam War ====
The Vietnam War brought another influx of injured veterans to Hines. In response, a $32 million, 1,200 bed hospital was built from 1966 to 1970 to replace the Main Infirmary Building.

=== 21st Century ===
In the twenty-first century, Hines expanded a number of clinical and support services. A new Blind Rehabilitation Center and Spinal Cord Injury Center were dedicated in 2005, followed by the opening of a Fisher House in 2010. The hospital also established a Women's Health Clinic, expanded community-based outpatient clinics throughout the Chicago region, opened an ambulatory surgery unit, and developed supportive housing through the Freedom's Path project. The most recent developments are a new Blind Rehabilitation Center and Spinal Cord Injury Center in 2005.

During the COVID-19 pandemic, Hines erected temporary treatment shelters, operated vaccine clinics, and administered the first COVID-19 vaccination to an Illinois veteran. In 2020, the hospital also opened a dedicated Kidney Transplant Unit.

== Historical recognition ==
The campus also played a role in early aviation history. Air mail operations were based on the grounds during the 1920s, and Charles Lindbergh piloted the inaugural Chicago-to-St. Louis air mail flight on April 15, 1926. Several former air mail buildings on the campus later became recognized for their historic significance. The historic value of the campus was recognized in 1980, when the Old Airmail and Postal Service Buildings were determined to be eligible for the National Register of Historic Places by the National Park Service. The buildings may be the oldest mail airport structures in the United States, serving the Postal Service between 1922 and 1927. Charles Lindbergh piloted the maiden air mail flight between Chicago and St. Louis, Missouri on April 15, 1926. Today, the buildings house a garage and an inflammable storage building. Two years later, the VA hospital was also determined eligible for listing, although neither property was listed in the following decades. These two entities were combined into the Edward Hines Jr. Veterans Administration Hospital Historic District, which was listed on October 9, 2013. The 45-acre (18 ha) district includes twenty-six of the early buildings on campus.
