= Henry F. Vaughan =

American epidemiologist

Henry Frieze Vaughan (October 12, 1889 – March 14, 1979) was an American epidemiologist with a strong discipline in environmental health, an academic professor, and an administrator. Among the positions he held, he was the Health Commissioner for the City of Detroit (1919–1941), editor for “American Journal of Public Health” (1922–1924), President of American Public Health in 1925, trustee of the W. K. Kellogg Foundation (1933–1978), President of Council at the Michigan Department of Council (1939–1960), founder and Dean of the University of Michigan School of Public Health (1941–1960), and the co-founder and first president of the National Sanitation Foundation (1944–1966). Vaughan was born in Michigan and stayed in Michigan for most of his life contributing to the development and innovation of medical and health services in Michigan.

== Early years and education ==
Henry Frieze Vaughan was born in Ann Arbor, Michigan on October 12, 1880, the fourth of five children of Dora Catherine Taylor Vaughan and Victor C. Vaughan, M.D. Vaughan's parents were both from Missouri. His father was a doctor who held the position of the dean of the University of Michigan Medical School for thirty years. In Ann Arbor, he attended Ann Arbor High School and graduated in 1908. At a young age, he was influenced by his father's interest in public health and sanitation issues. Unlike his brothers who followed his father's footsteps, he took an alternative route and chose to become an epidemiologist. From then on, he attended the University of Michigan to earn his bachelor's degree in Engineering in 1912, a master's degree in Engineering in 1913, and lastly a doctoral degree in Public Health in 1916 in which he wrote his dissertation on the “Observations on Typhoid Fever in Detroit”. He was the first person at the University of Michigan to earn the Doctor of Public Health degree.

== Career ==
Almost immediately after attaining his Master in Engineering, he joined the Michigan department of Health as a sanitary engineer. He soon was transferred to the Department of Health in Detroit in 1914 and eventually became an epidemiologist in 1915. After attaining his Doctoral degree in Public Health, he was appointed as Deputy Commissioner. During World War I, he was assigned by the Surgeon General William C. Gorgas to serve as the Captain of the Sanitary Corps to control the spread of pneumonia in the U.S. military camps from 1917 to 1918. He returned to Detroit in 1919 and was appointed to be the Health Commissioner for the city of Detroit till 1941.

== Health Commissioner ==
At the age of 29, Vaughan was not only the youngest but also one of the few Health Commissioners in the country who did not have a degree in medicine. As health commissioner for the city of Detroit, he saw the need for qualified physician to not only practice curative medicine, but also, preventative medicine. During his time as health commissioner, there were significant cases of smallpox, typhoid fever, and diphtheria; however, many physicians were unaware of the new treatment for these communicable diseases. He initiated a “medical participation” campaign where physicians were to practice preventative medicine by administering immunization, attend conferences to become up to date on current treatment for these diseases and future health issues, and lastly having the public participate in preventative medicine by allowing public health nurses to come to their houses to periodically check up and educate them.

Vaughan hoped that this campaign will protect a higher percent of children between the ages of six month and ten years against diphtheria, increase the vaccination for small pox, increase periodic health examination, and periodic dental examination. With this in mind, Vaughan emphasized health education because he believed that “no community can be more healthful than its citizens”. It was important to reach every citizen concerning health education but he believed that it was more important to do less and do a more effective work on limited scale. He encouraged the health department to use radio, magazines, and billboards to convey the messages regarding health education and ways to safely prevent one from a disease.

He had fought a smallpox epidemic in which he gave the citizens of Detroit the choice of being vaccinated or going home and remaining under police guard for three weeks and a full incubation period. Furthermore, as commissioner, he had to deal with the problems with garbage disposal because Detroit at that time was growing larger and larger. With the increase in garbage and inadequate method of removing it, Vaughan had decided to incinerate the garbage because it was very economical and very sanitary.

Lastly, he was committed to Detroit in bringing up young talented professionals. Vaughan was the Health Commissioner during the Great Depression and without his help, Joseph Molner, John Hanlon, and George Badger would not have had a successful career. Vaughan went to MIT and Harvard to scout for these talented professionals and offered them a job at the Detroit Health Department while they finished their completed their degree in medical education at Wayne State or University of Michigan.

== Dean of the University of Michigan School of Public Health ==
Since 1921, Vaughan was a guest lecturer at the University of Michigan. In 1939, Rockefeller Foundation committee concluded that the nation had a shortage of well trained health personnel and should establish schools to train these professions. The University of Michigan responded quickly and agreed to create a school dedicated for that purpose. With the great depression, the University of Michigan Public Health School was made possible by the contribution of a half a million dollar each from the Rockefeller Foundation and the W.K. Kellog Foundation in 1941. The University of Michigan asked Vaughan to come back permanently on July 18, 1941 to be appointed as the first Dean of the Public Health School at the University of Michigan and create the public school from the Division of Hygiene and Public Health. With lack of resources and instructors, the opening of The School of Public Health offered only three departments: Public Health Practice, Epidemiology, and Environmental Health which included public health engineering and industrial health. With Vaughan's expertise in environmental health, the School of Public Health was able to create an enriching curriculum that included 20 courses and a well established environmental health program. Tropical Disease was later added as the fourth department in 1943 because of the US involvement in World War II. By the end of 1949, there were a total of 15 departments. Vaughn emphasized public health research and developed virology and parasitic diseases, tropical disease, industrial health, and public health engineering laboratories. These laboratories were supported by the Foundation for Infantile Paralysis, Inc., the United States Public Health Service and other organizations. Among the breakthroughs in disease control during his deanship, the public health school contributed through the development of the first influenza vaccine by Dr. Thomas Francis Jr. and the polio vaccine by Dr. Jonas Salk in 1954. Vaughan was heavily involved with the construction of the Public Health Building. He was also able to attain Nathan Sinai, Thomas Francis, and Kenneth Easlick as faculties who are highly regarded in the field of public health to establish a real competence in health services organization and epidemiology. By the end of retirement in 1960, Vaughan created a school that is the largest program in environmental and industrial health in any academic institution in the country and whose graduates were highly sought out for positions in public health leadership worldwide.

== National Sanitation Foundation ==
In 1944, Vaughan, Walter F. Snyder, the Director of the Environment Sanitation Program for the health department of Toledo, and Nathan Sinai, one of the School of Public Health faculty were discussing the problems concerning sanitation. At the time, there was no basic research in sanitary science, no accepted uniform sanitation standards, and many sanitation regulations conflicted with each other. They believed that the nation would be better if there was a “nationwide environmental health regulation from the collaboration of health officials and all levels of government, manufacturers producing health related equipment, users of such equipment, and institutional consultants with expert knowledge of equipment design of health protection”. With this method, they believed they will arrive with better results than through the use of ordinances, inspections, and law enforcement. From this motivation, the National Sanitation Foundation (NSF), currently named NSF International, was created in October 1944. Vaughan acted as the President, Sinai as vice president, and Snyder as Treasurer and Executive Director. With the approval of the board of regents, the University of Michigan allowed the National Sanitation Foundation and the laboratory to be operating in the basement of the Public Health Building. The NSF standardized sanitation and developed food safety requirements. During the time Vaughan was president, he held national conference, identified area of need which the program can provide assistance and gained the confidence of industries on “part of health regulatory personnel that they might rely upon the objectivity and integrity of NSF services”.

== Awards and honors ==
Vaughan received the Sedgewick Award for distinguished service in the field of public health. He is an honorary fellow of the Royal Sanitary Institute of England.

== Personal life ==
Vaughan married Grace Seeley, a civic leader and public health worker, in 1914. They had one son, Henry Frieze Jr., who was born in 1918.
