= Mount Airy, Missouri =

Unincorporated community in Missouri, U.S.

Coordinates: 39°22′37″N 92°38′06″W

Mount Airy is an unincorporated community in Randolph County, in the U.S. state of Missouri.

== History ==
Variant names were "Mountairy" and "Uptonsville". A post office called Mount Airy was established in 1831, and remained in operation until 1902. The community was so named on account of its lofty elevation, being 740 feet (230 meters) above sea level.
