= Herman Kiefer =

American diplomat

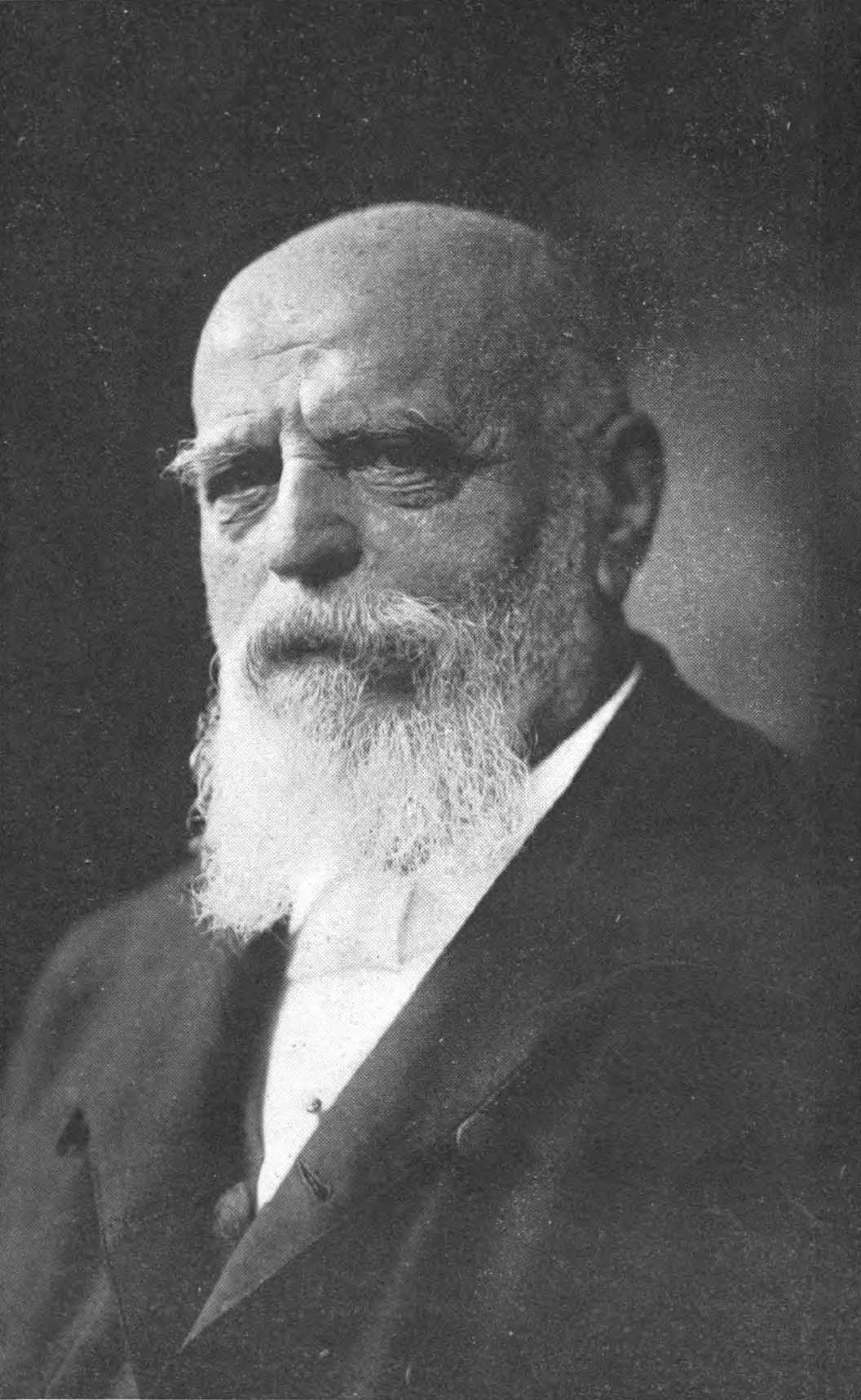

Herman Kiefer (19 November 1825 Sulzburg, Grand Duchy of Baden – 11 October 1911), in German also spelled Hermann Kiefer, was a physician, politician and diplomat of the United States.

== Biography ==
=== Germany ===
Kiefer attended gymnasia at Freiburg, Mannheim, and Karlsruhe. His childhood hero was Frederick the Great. He wrote his first poem, "The Death of Socrates," in 1839, while at Freiburg. He continued writing poems for the rest of his life, and spent much of his youth wandering in the Black Forest. At Mannheim, Karl Blind was his mentor and introduced him to the circle of Gustav Struve. He studied medicine at Freiburg (1844–1845; 1846–1847; 1848–1849), Heidelberg (1845–1846), Prague (one semester, 1848), and Vienna (one semester, 1848). He passed his state examinations at Karlsruhe, and received his license to practice medicine on 29 May 1849. In Heidelberg, he was a member of Corps Suevia society; in Freiburg, he joined a Turnerverein, and helped found the Alberta society.

He was a delegate to the Offenburg meetings of 12 September 1847 and 19 March 1848, and chairman of the mass meeting at Freiburg on 26 March 1848. He served as surgeon to the Army of the Republic of Baden (the revolutionaries) in the volunteer regiment of Emmendingen during the revolution of 1848-1849, taking part in the battle of Philippsburg (20 June 1849) and Ubstadt (23 June 1849). On the advice of a family friend to his father, he became a fugitive on 10 July 1849, Strassbourg being the initial target of his flight.

=== United States ===
He arrived in the United States in September 1849, and settled in Detroit in October, where he began the practice of medicine on the 19th of that month. He was actively interested in German-American affairs. He gave the oration for the celebration of the centennial of Friedrich Schiller's birth in Detroit in 1859, and was a founder of the German-American seminary, of which he was president and treasurer 1861-1872. He was a member of the Detroit Board of Education 1866-1867, and in 1882 he became a member of the Public Library Commission, being re-elected in 1883 for a term of six years, and adding to the library a large collection of German works. He was a regent of the University of Michigan 1889-1901.

He was chairman of the German Republican executive committee of Utica, Michigan, in 1854, a presidential elector in 1872, and a delegate to the Republican National Convention held in Cincinnati in 1876. In 1883, he was appointed by President Chester Arthur as U.S. Consul to Stettin, a Prussian city in what is now Poland, which office he held until he resigned in 1885. He prepared valuable articles, which were published in the U. S. consular reports, and include American Trade with Stettin, How Germany is Governed, and Labor in Europe.

== Family ==
Kiefer was born as Johann Ludwig Grether, son of unmarried Rosina Sophie Grether. When he was a teenager, his father, the physician Conrad Kiefer, recognized him. He didn't only carry the surname Kiefer from then on, but also received the additional first name Hermann. When the child was born, Kiefer was married to Christina Friederika née Schweyckert, daughter to the Botanical Garden of the Grand Duke in Karlsruhe.

Herman Kiefer married Franciska Kehle of Bonndorf, Grand Duchy of Baden, on 21 July 1850. She died 6 August 1909. They had nine children, of whom six, five sons and a daughter, survived into adulthood.

== Legacy ==
The Herman Kiefer Hospital was named after him. It was the Detroit public health hospital for 100 years. His namesake building was built in 1928, and used as a hospital until 2013 (85 years).
